= Limerick–Rosslare railway line =

Railway line in Ireland

Limerick–Rosslare Main Line
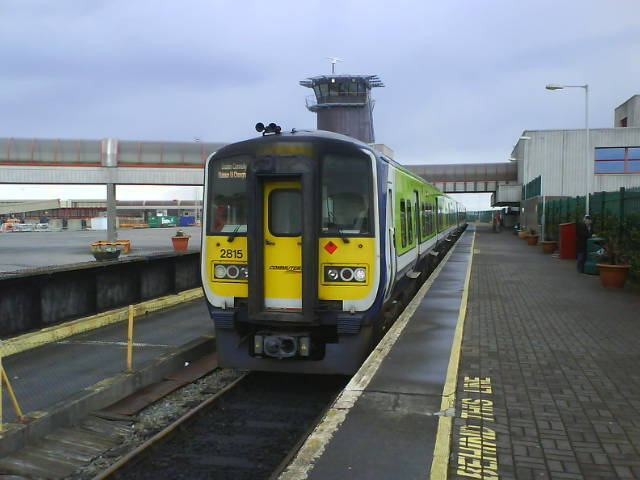
- 2815 at the Rosslare Europort station (not served by the line since 2010)

Overview
- Status: Operational (between Limerick and Waterford)
- Owner: Iarnród Éireann
- Locale: Ireland
- Termini: Limerick Colbert; Waterford Plunkett (1854–1906, 2010–present) Rosslare Europort (1906–2010)
- Stations: 7

Service
- Type: Commuter rail, Inter-city rail Heavy rail
- System: Iarnród Éireann
- Services: InterCity: Limerick–Waterford; Dublin–Limerick; Commuter: Limerick–Limerick Junction
- Operator: Iarnród Éireann
- Depot(s): Carrick-on-Suir; Limerick
- Rolling stock: 2800 Class (Commuter); 22000 Class (InterCity)

History
- Opened: 1848
- Closed: 2010 (Waterford to Rosslare)

Technical
- Line length: 123.1 kilometres (76.5 mi) (Operational track only)
- Number of tracks: Double track (Limerick–Killonan); Single track with passing loops (Killonan–Rosslare)
- Character: Tertiary
- Track gauge: 1,600 mm (5 ft 3 in) Irish gauge
- Electrification: Not electrified
- Operating speed: 100 km/h (62 mph) (Limerick–Killonan); 110 km/h (68 mph) (Killonan–Limerick Junction); 80 km/h (50 mph) (Limerick Junction–Waterford)

The Limerick–Rosslare Main Line is a railway route in Ireland that linked the city of Limerick on the Atlantic coast with Rosslare Europort on the coast of the Irish Sea. It also serves the city of Waterford, and at Limerick Junction it connects with the Dublin–Cork railway line.

Since 2010 there has been no service between Waterford and Rosslare Europort, and all trains terminate at Waterford. Rosslare (Europort and Strand) and Wexford have still at least three trains a day to Dublin, and three back (morning, afternoon and evening). The line between Rosslare and Waterford has been closed to passenger trains since September 2010, though it is still maintained by Iarnród Éireann.

Plans for reopening the Waterford to Rosslare section were confirmed after inclusion in the All Island Strategic Rail Review and the revised Trans-European Transport Network in 2024.

== History ==
Construction of the route was begun in 1848 for the Waterford and Limerick Railway and completed in 1854. It is one of the oldest railways in Ireland, and the first to have been authorised by the UK Parliament. The company was renamed the Waterford, Limerick and Western in 1896 and merged with the Great Southern and Western Railway in 1901.

The section between Waterford and Rosslare was completed in 1906 and coincided with the construction of Rosslare Harbour. Both Rosslare Europort and this section of rail line remain the property of the Fishguard & Rosslare Railways and Harbours Company, which is jointly owned by Iarnród Éireann and Stena Line. It is the only main line railway in the Republic not wholly owned by the State.

The Waterford to Rosslare section includes the Barrow Bridge, the longest rail bridge in Ireland. At the time of construction, the line from Waterford diverged at Killinick, allowing for direct Waterford to Wexford trains to bypass Rosslare Strand.

A notable feature on the line is the Cahir Viaduct across the River Suir in County Tipperary. It was built in 1852 and has three iron spans borne on stone abutments. The viaduct was damaged in incidents in 1955 and 2003. Following the 2003 incident, Iarnród Éireann renewed the viaduct at a cost of €2.6 million and the line reopened in September 2004.

Train services have remained infrequent for more than 100 years. By 2003 the line was carrying fewer than 100 passengers a day. When IÉ reopened the line it introduced new railcars and a service of three journeys in each direction on weekdays, which was a greater service frequency than the line had for much of its history. There is no Sunday service.

== Route ==
Between Limerick and Limerick Junction, trains between Limerick and Dublin Heuston also serve the line.

The speed limit on much of the line is less than 80 km/h (50 mph), but the speed limit west of Limerick Junction is a higher 110 km/h (68 mph).

=== Waterford – Rosslare section ===
The Waterford to Rosslare section was traditionally a busy freight line, transporting 150,000 tonnes of sugar beet via the handling facility at Wellingtonbridge until the demise of the sugar industry in 2006. As a result of this significant freight traffic, passenger services were reduced over the years.

On 12 March 2010 it was announced that Iarnród Éireann would review the service between Waterford and Rosslare Europort because few passengers were using it. Timetabling was poor. There was only one train each way daily from Monday to Saturday, leaving Rosslare early in the morning and returning from Waterford early in the evening.

The trains made very poor connections with other rail services. They connected with the Stena Line ferry service to and from Fishguard Harbour, but due to the poor onward connections at Waterford few passengers used this. The exception was during the volcanic ash crisis of 2010, when trains were fully loaded and had standing room only.

The last train between Waterford and Rosslare ran on 18 September 2010. Iarnród Éireann provided a four-car 2700 class diesel multiple unit for the service, instead of the usual two-car unit. The National Transport Authority requires IÉ to maintain the now-disused line.

Bus Éireann revised the timetable and route of bus service 370 to offer alternative passenger transport from 20 September. Buses on the route are branded "370 Connect".

As of 2020, a campaign was ongoing in the local area to reopen the rail line. In 2021, it was confirmed that the route would be examined for reopening as part of an All-Island Strategic Rail Review.

The All-Island Strategic Rail Review, published in July 2023, recommended the reinstatement of the line to "boost connectivity in the South East." The omission of the line in the government's 'prioritisation strategy' published in December 2025 has attracted criticism, with local politician David Cullinane describing it as a "real slap in the face."

== Services ==
IE 22000 Class InterCity railcars usually operate services on the line. Between 2012 and 2013 IÉ operated IE 2800 Class railcars on the line. From 2004 until 2012 IE 2700 Class railcars operated most services. Until 2003 IÉ operated most trains with a CIE 141 Class or CIE 181 Class diesel-electric locomotive hauling Cravens coaches.

== Notable incidents ==
- In 1955 an out-of-control train crashed through the buffers in the loop at Cahir and fell through the deck of the viaduct. The driver and fireman were killed.
- In 2003 a train of 22 cement wagons was derailed on the viaduct. The locomotive and driver safely crossed the bridge, but 13 of the wagons behind the locomotive fell through the deck of the bridge into the river. The Department of Transport's Interim Railway Safety Commission investigated the accident and found that timber supporting the rails was rotten, which may have allowed the rails to spread and the wagons to fall between the rails. Services resumed in September 2004 with diesel railcars, but further engineering works dogged services, requiring frequent bus replacements of the train services.
- In 2012 a young girl was hit and injured by a train near Tipperary Town which was travelling from Limerick Junction to Waterford. She was taken to hospital. No-one aboard the train was injured.

== Bibliography ==
- Murray, KA (1976). Great Southern And Western Railway. Billericay: Irish Railway Record Society (London Area). ISBN 0904078051.

== See also ==
- Dublin-Rosslare railway line
