= Moyross railway station =

Planned railway station

Coordinates: 52.6815°N 8.6436°W

Moyross railway station is a proposed railway station projected to be built in the suburb of Moyross, Limerick in Ireland. If built as proposed, it is due to be located along the Limerick to Galway railway line, with a projected journey time between Limerick Colbert railway station and Moyross of "less than nine minutes". Rail transport developments in Limerick, including the proposed station, are organised under the Limerick Shannon Metropolitan Area Transport Strategy (LSMATS).

Plans for the station were announced in October 2022 as part of the then Irish government's Pathfinder Programme. As of May 2024, a preferred location for the proposed station had been published and a public consultation exercise due to run from 20 May 2024 until 14 June 2024. A planning application for the proposed station was submitted by Irish Rail in August 2025, and was approved by Limerick County Council in October 2025.

While, as of late 2025, it was suggested that construction could commence during 2026, the government's Sustainable Mobility Policy Action Plan 2026-2030, published in March 2026, suggested that tendering would commence in late 2026, with construction potentially starting in Q2 2027. In April 2026, it was reported that, while the "construction strategy and budget for the station includes the use of the Moyross United lands", the soccer club had not yet agreed to a proposed 18-month lease arrangement owing to a disagreement on a proposed road.

Preceding station	Iarnród Éireann	Following station
	Proposed	
Limerick	InterCity; Limerick–Galway	Sixmilebridge
Limerick	Commuter; Limerick Suburban Rail	Sixmilebridge
