= IÉ 2600 Class =

1994 Irish railcar class

Iarnród Éireann 2600 Class
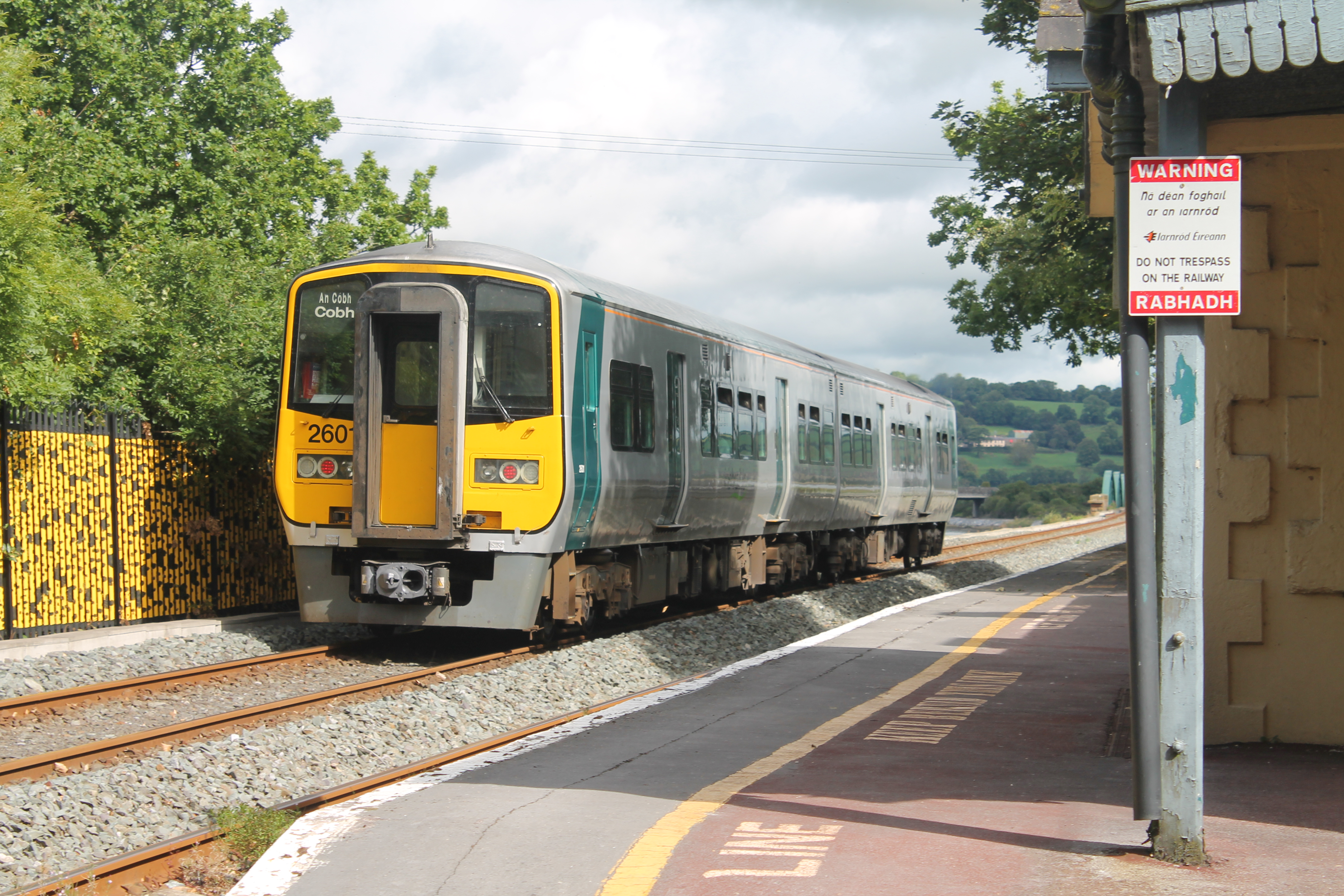
- 2601 at Fota in August 2013

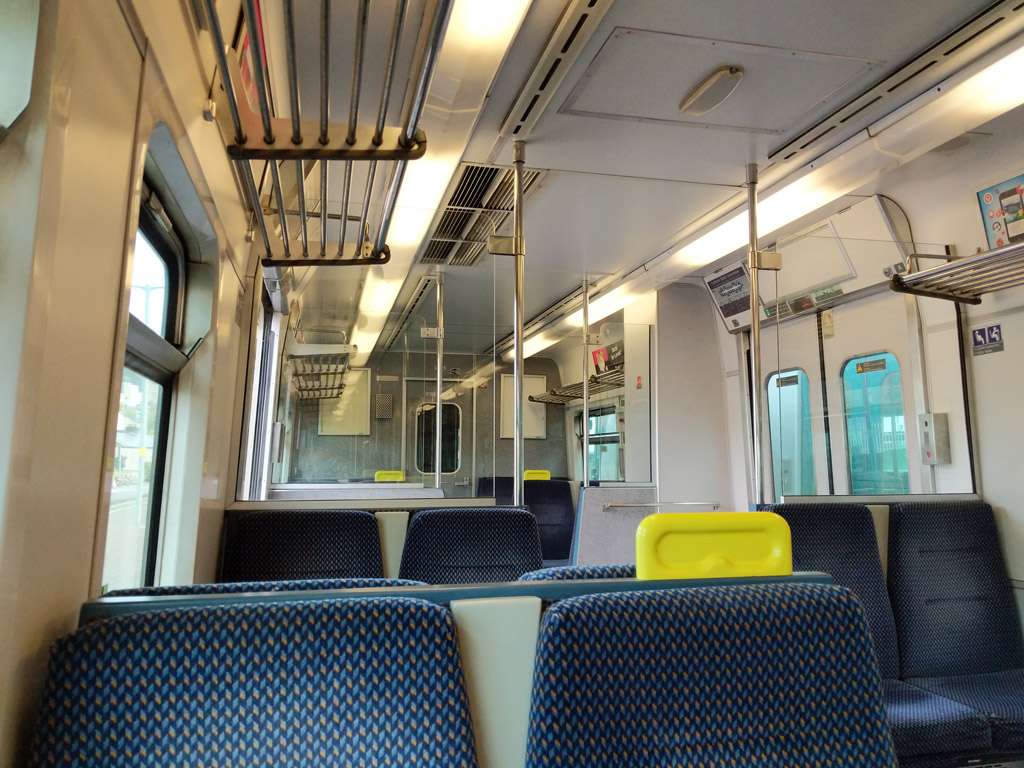
- Interior
- In service: 16 May 1994 – present
- Manufacturer: Tokyu Car Corporation
- Family name: Tokyu Commuter
- Replaced: Separate locomotives and carriages
- Constructed: 1993
- Number built: 17 railcars
- Number in service: 16 railcars (8 2-car sets)
- Number scrapped: 1 (2609)
- Formation: 2 cars per trainset
- Fleet numbers: 2601 – 2617
- Capacity: 130 seated
- Operator: Commuter
- Depot: Cork
- Line served: Cork Commuter routes

Specifications
- Maximum speed: 75 mph (120 km/h)
- Weight: 42 t (41 long tons; 46 short tons)
- Prime mover: One Cummins NTA-855-R1 of 260 kW (349 hp) per car
- Transmission: Hydraulic
- Braking systems: Air, 2 brake discs per axle
- Track gauge: 1,600 mm (5 ft 3 in); See Rail gauge in Ireland

The 2600 Class is a type of diesel multiple unit operated on the Irish railway network by Iarnród Éireann, used mainly for short-haul Commuter services. At present the entire class is based in Cork, and is used on local services to Mallow, Midleton, Cobh and on token services to Tralee. A hybrid unit was based in Limerick until it was withdrawn in 2012 and was stored in Cork before being scrapped in 2025.

== Description ==
The 2600 Class were the first set of diesel railcars purchased by Iarnród Éireann, which had for several years only run multiple units on the electrified DART service. A IR£19.5 million (around €47M in 2023) order for a total of seventeen railcars was constructed by the Tokyu Car Corporation in Japan in 1993 and arrived in Dublin on 14 February 1994 for use on the commuter service between Dublin and Kildare. This marked the first occasion a Japanese train fleet had been used in Europe. The stock were the first rolling stock to be delivered in Arrow livery, initially used to refer solely to the Dublin-Kildare commuter service upon which they were deployed, although they were rebranded in the 2000s to the new Commuter livery. They were the very last Iarnród Éireann rolling stock to be shipped with the firm's original IR logo, though this was replaced with the IÉ version shortly after the trains entered service.

== Deployment ==
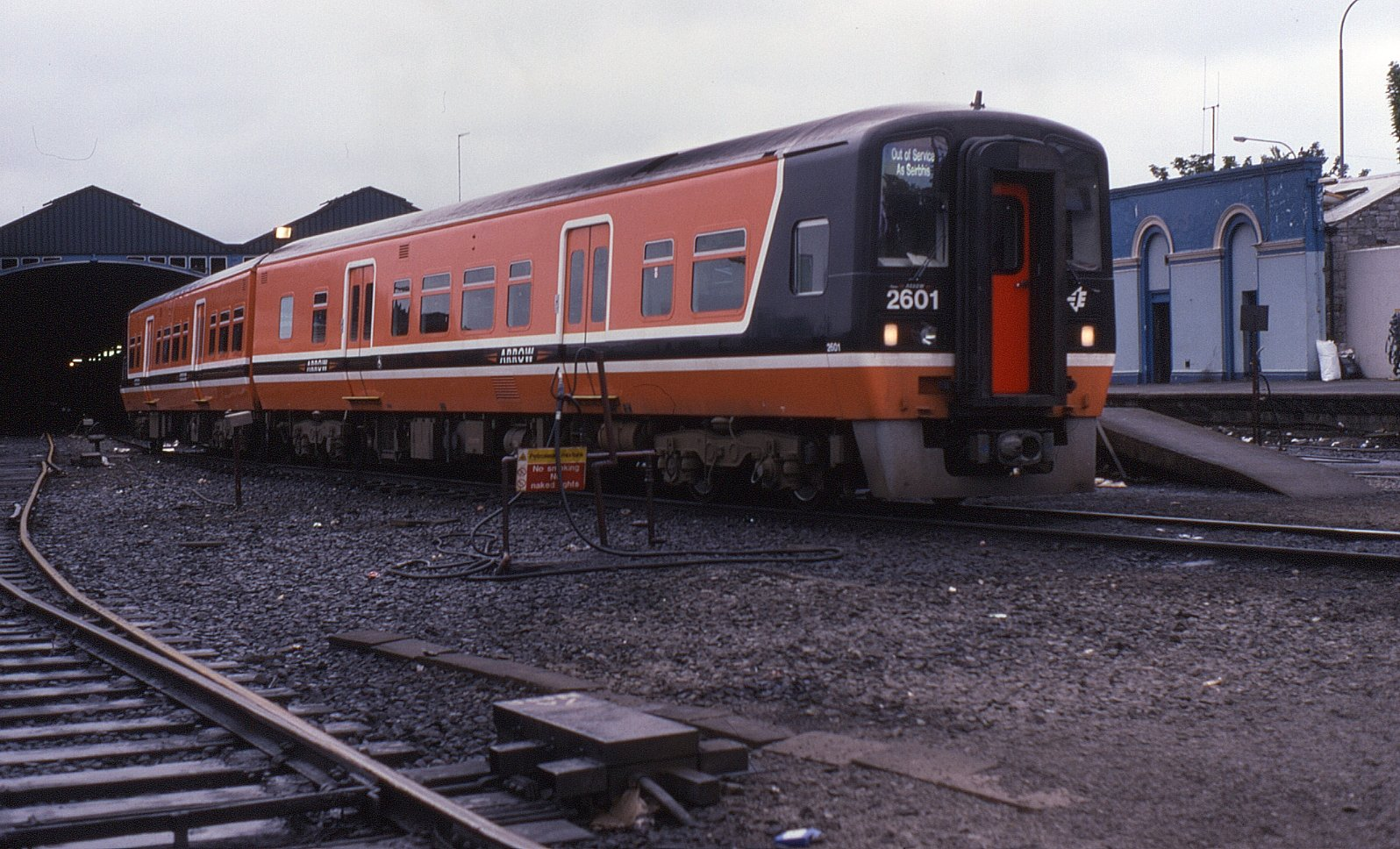
2601 at Dublin Heuston in June 1995

The 2600 Class trains were initially deployed on the brand new Dublin-Kildare Arrow service, starting on 16 May 1994 (now rebranded South Western Commuter). Although purchased for the new service, which began in 1994, they were also to be seen up until the early 2000s supplementing the locomotive hauled "Craven" coaching stock on Western Suburban (now Western Commuter) services, and occasionally on other lines also.

Since the delivery of the IÉ 22000 Class, all 2600 class railcars have been moved to Cork, where they work the Cork Suburban Rail services. Eight trainsets are formed with two railcars each. They are serviced in Limerick and on occasion operate services from Limerick.

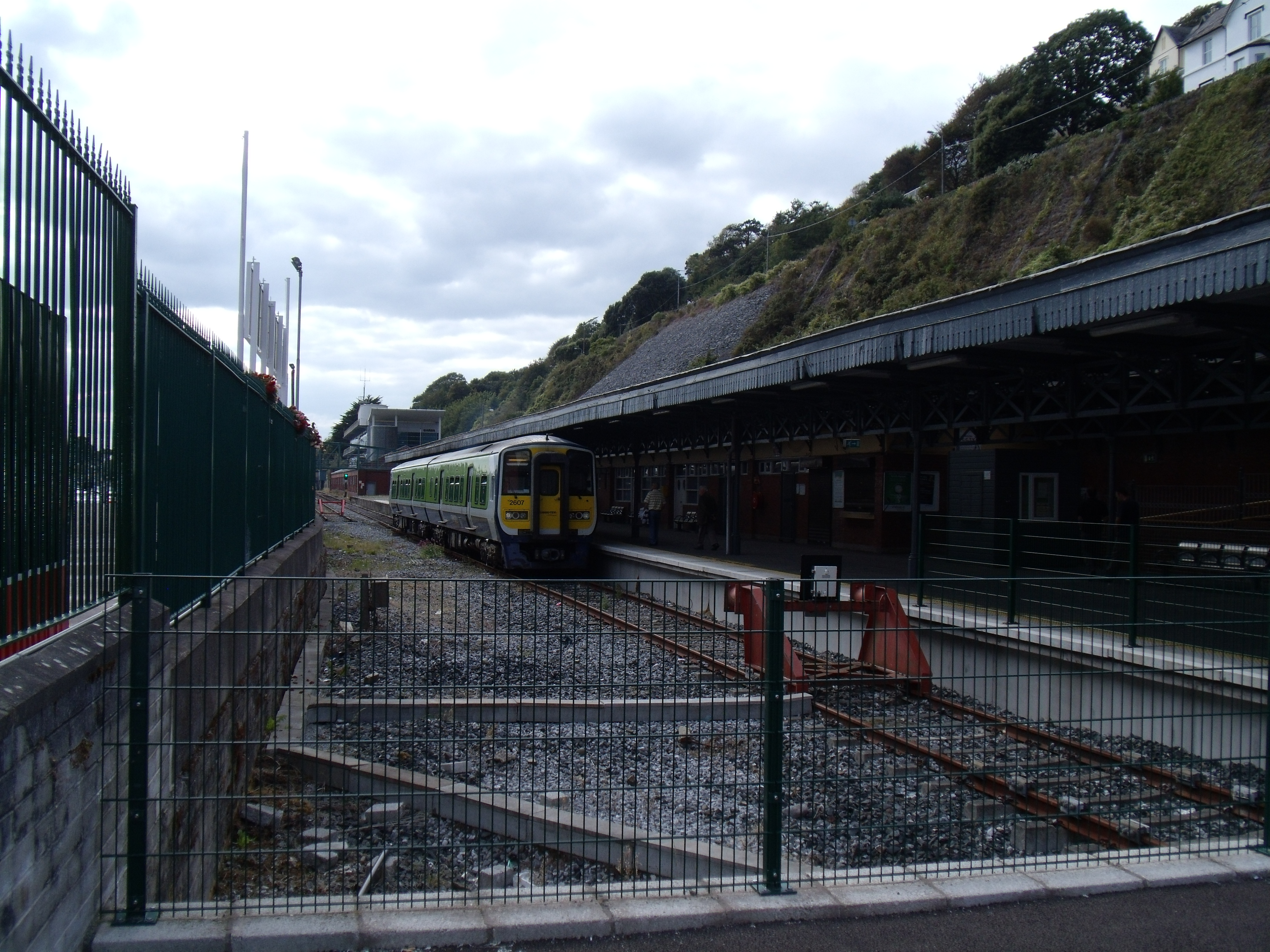
2607 at Cobh in June 2011

== Fleet details ==
The 2600 class are able to operate with both 2700/2750 class and 2800 class railcars.

All 2600 Class sets carry the new Iarnród Éireann-Irish Rail logo and silver InterCity livery since August 2013. 2610/2613 was the last 2600 Class DMU to carry the Commuter livery.

Due to the odd total number of vehicles, a hybrid set 2609/2716 had been formed. This was withdrawn with the rest of the 2700s and was stored in a shed in Cork station. This was latterly scrapped in July 2025, becoming the first 2600 class vehicle to be scrapped.

Sets 2610/2613, 2611/2612, 2604/2603, 2615/2606 and 2607/08 had their front gangway connections removed in November 2022, summer 2023 and November 2025 respectively, similar to the 2800 class units.

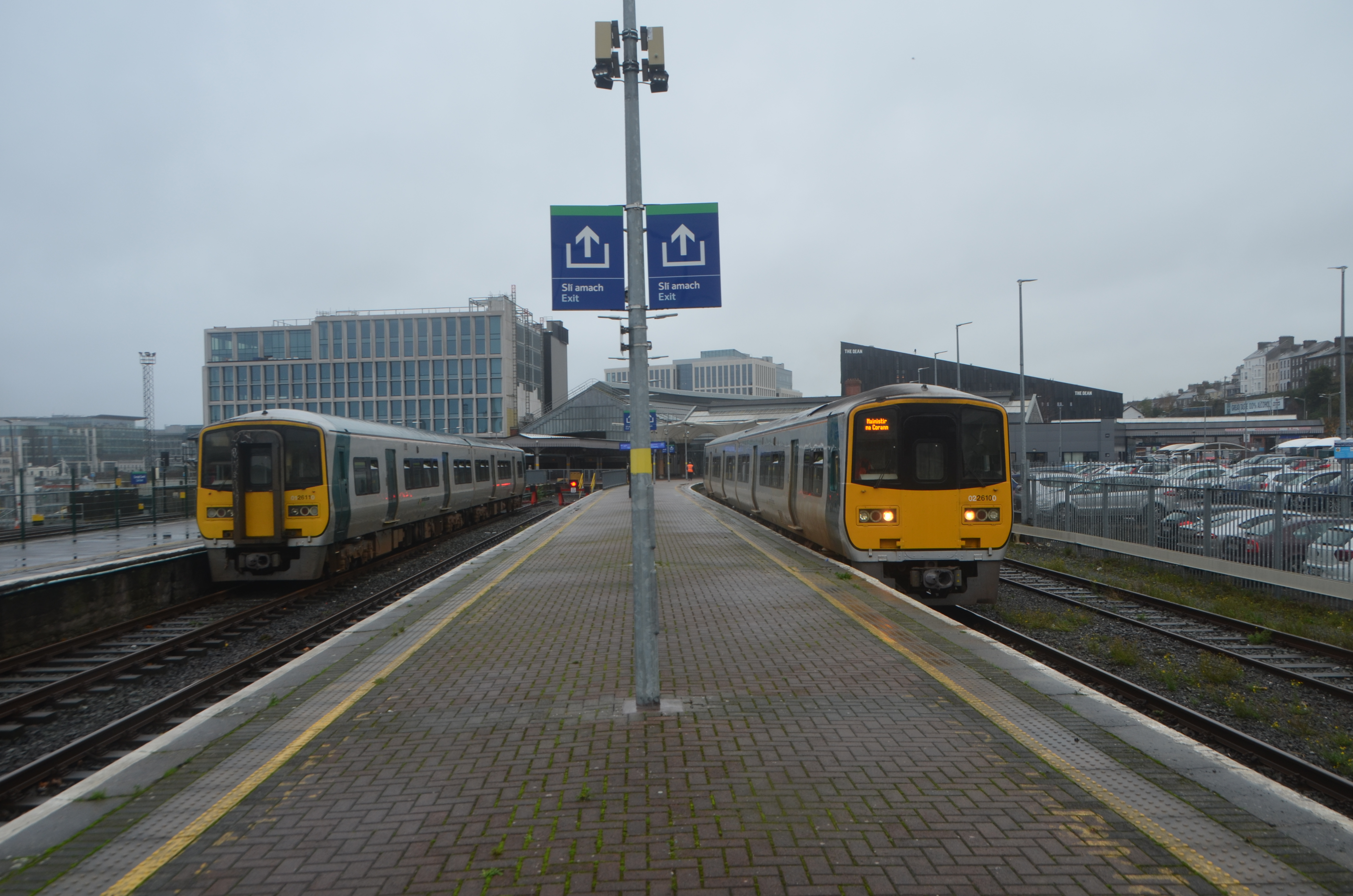
2610/13 without gangways, 2611/12 with gangways in Kent Station Cork

2601 in 30th anniversary livery at Kent Station Cork, 23 October 2025

Class	Operator	Number	Year built	Cars per Set	Unit nos.	Notes
2600 Class	Commuter	16 (formerly 17)	1993-1994	2	2601/2602 2603/2604 2605/2616 2606/2615; 2607/2608 2610/2613 2611/2612 2614/2617	2609 operated as a hybrid 2-car unit with 2716 (Now withdrawn)

== Notable railtours ==
In 2024, the units 2601/2602 were repainted in the original Arrow livery to mark the 2600 Class' 30th anniversary. The unit travelled to areas that the 2600 Class used to operate in, on 18 and 19 May 2024.
