= Limerick Suburban Rail =

Train services in Limerick, Ireland

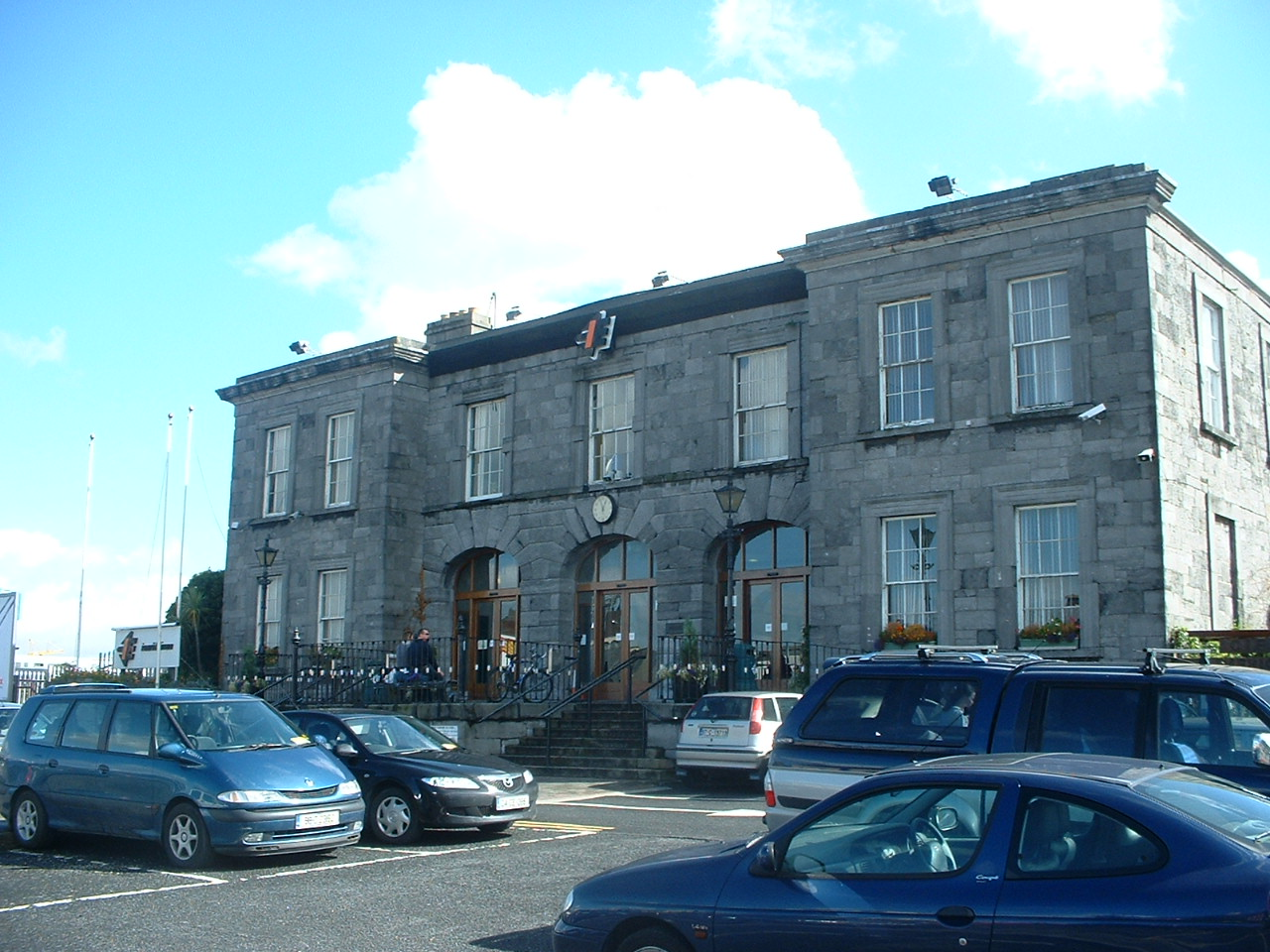
Limerick Colbert railway station, the main station on the Limerick Suburban Rail network.

Limerick Suburban Rail (Irish: Iarnród Fo-uirbeach Luimnigh) are a group of Iarnród Éireann commuter train services from Limerick Colbert to various other destinations on three different lines.

- Limerick – Ennis, calling at Sixmilebridge
- Limerick – Nenagh, calling at Castleconnell and Birdhill
- Limerick – Limerick Junction and Thurles

== Limerick to Ennis ==
The Limerick to Ennis suburban service runs over the southernmost 24.5 miles (39.4 km) of the former Waterford, Limerick and Western Railway(WL&WR) track between Limerick and the junction with the Dublin–Galway mainline at Athenry. In the 2016 timetable, nine services per weekday are operated from Limerick to Ennis and vice versa, five and four of each being stops made by Limerick-Galway InterCity trains respectively. Sunday service is eight trains from Limerick to Ennis and nine trains from Ennis to Limerick, and similarly four trains per direction are Limerick-Galway InterCity services. Services are timetabled for a 40-minute duration.

Passenger services on this section ceased in 1976 but were re-introduced in 1988 as far as Ennis and were increased progressively until a full six-weekday service was begun in 1994 which also had a limited Sunday service. A further expansion to eight services per weekday was begun in 2003 with the timetable further reorganised in March 2010 to incorporate the newly reopened track north of Ennis and services between Limerick and Galway. Iarnród Éireann proposed that its timetable revision in 2011 would include an extra train from Galway to Ennis to meet an existing Limerick–Ennis–Limerick train to create a sixth service per direction per weekday between Limerick and Galway.

As of 2016, both InterCity and Commuter services are operated by 2800 Class diesel railcars whose 70 mph (110 km/h) top speed is sufficient for the limits of the existing single-track line (50 mph or 80 km/h with partial restrictions of between 25 and 40 mph or 40 and 64 km/h. These railcars normally operate in sets of two, offering 85 seats but platform lengths will allow between one and four such cars to operate together. The signalling system on this line only allows one train operating in the section at a time, but a passing loop is planned for the section's only intermediate halt at Sixmilebridge, which would permit trains to depart from Ennis and from Limerick at about the same time and pass each other within the limits of the loop track.

== Limerick to Nenagh Commuter Line ==
The Limerick Colbert to Nenagh commuter rail line operates over a short section of the Limerick – Limerick Junction line before joining the Limerick–Ballybrophy railway line at Killonan Junction, County Limerick.

As of the 2023 timetable, Monday to Friday services included 3 trains to Limerick and Saturday services included 2 trains to Limerick, with 2 trains Monday-Saturday from Limerick to Ballybrophy. On Sundays, it is 1 train each way. For trains Monday-Friday, two sets of IÉ 2800 Class railcars travel to Nenagh and uncouple there. The first set travels to Ballybrophy serving Cloughjordan and Roscrea for connecting Dublin-Cork mainline services, and the second set forms the commuter service to Limerick serving Birdhill, Castleconnell and Limerick. Journey times have reduced from over 60 minutes in the 2016 timetable to 53 minutes in the 2023 timetable.

The North Tipperary Community Rail Partnership (NTCRP) has criticised the lack of services provided on the line. Other criticisms have come from communities on the line over the 'skeleton' service provided on the line.

The service is operated by 2800 Class diesel railcars, whose 70 mph (110 km/h) top speeds are sufficient for the 60 mph limits between Limerick and Ballybrophy. In 2021, Iarnród Éireann undertook a major project of replacing much of the track between Killonan Junction and Ballybrophy to bring it up to date, replacing jointed rail with continuous welded rail (CWR). Much of the work has been completed as of 2023.

== Limerick to Limerick Junction ==
This service is principally a shuttle along part of the Limerick–Rosslare railway line between Limerick station and Limerick Junction connecting to and from mainline services between Dublin and Cork as well as to a regional service to Waterford. In the late 2000s, an enhanced commuter aspect was developed following the completion of an expansion of Limerick Junction station car park in 2010. In the same year, Iarnród Éireann also introduced a morning service from Thurles to Limerick from Monday to Friday which passes through Limerick Junction.

There are no intermediate stops on the 17-mile (27 km) 70 mph (110 km/h) Limerick Junction–Killonan Junction section or the 4.5-mile (7.2 km) 60 mph (97 km/h) Killonan Junction–Limerick section. Some services are part of direct Dublin–Limerick intercity trains operating using 22000 Class InterCity diesel railcars and the others operate using 2800 Class diesel railcars. Journey time is between 25 and 36 minutes in the 2016 timetable.

== See also ==
- Belfast Suburban Rail
- Dublin Suburban Rail
- Cork Suburban Rail
- Galway Suburban Rail
- Rail transport in Ireland
