= IÉ 2700 and 2750 Classes =

Class of Irish diesel train

Iarnród Éireann 2700 Class
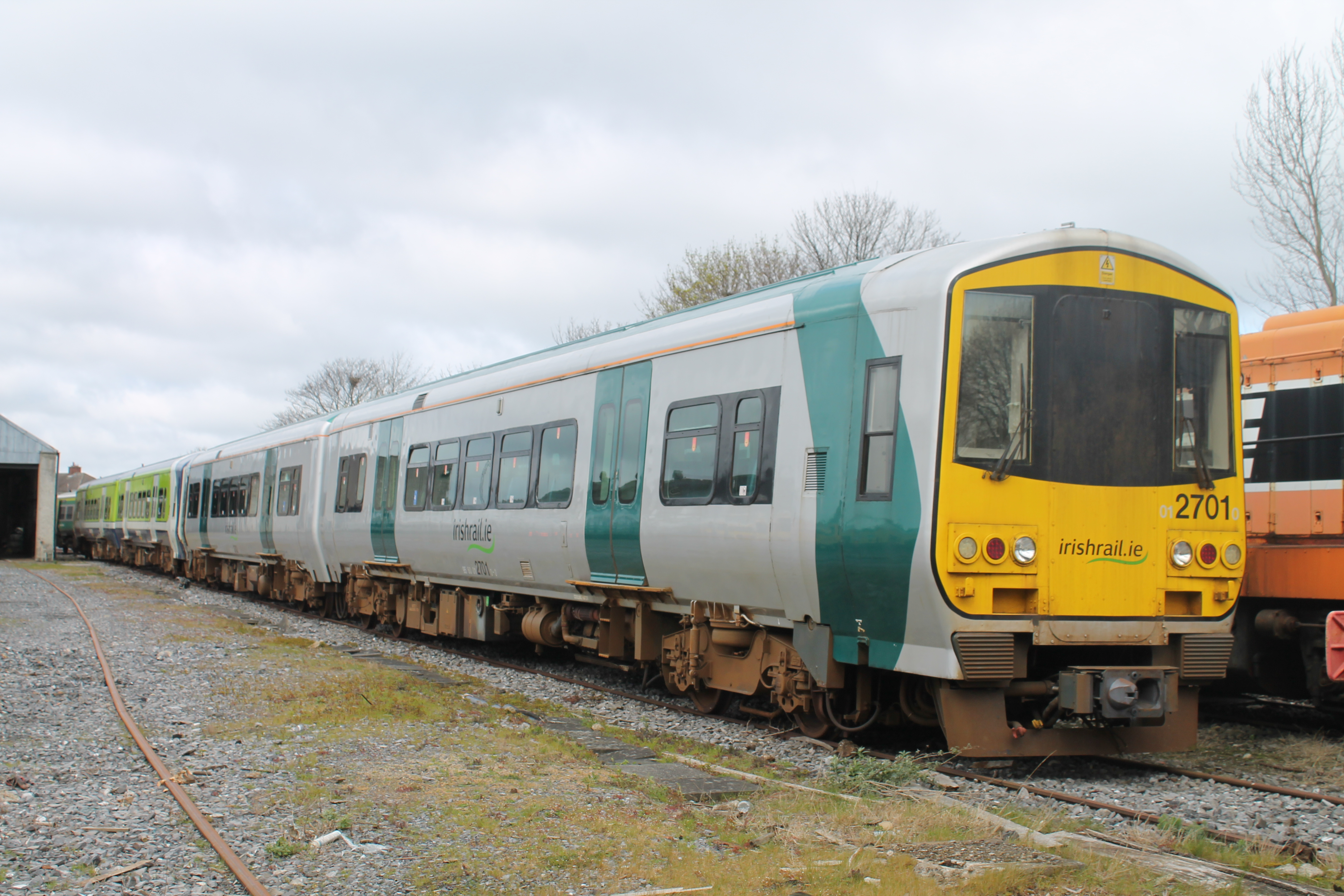
- 2701 stored at Inchicore Works in April 2016
- Stock type: Diesel Multiple Unit
- In service: 23 October 1998-10 August 2012
- Manufacturer: GEC Alsthom
- Family name: Alstom Commuter
- Constructed: 1997-1998
- Scrapped: 2025
- Number built: 12 sets, 1 spare car (25 carriages)
- Number scrapped: All 25 2700 vehicles Scrapped
- Formation: Two-car sets
- Fleet numbers: 2701 – 2724 & 2726
- Capacity: 117 seated
- Operator: Commuter
- Depots: Inchicore Works; Limerick

Specifications
- Car body construction: Steel
- Maximum speed: 110 km/h (68 mph)
- Weight: 38 tonnes (37 long tons; 42 short tons) per car
- Prime movers: Traction: Cummins NTA 855-R1, 350 bhp (260 kW). Aux. power: Cummins GB5.9GR / Iferca 61.5 kVA
- Braking systems: Air, 2 brake discs per axle
- Track gauge: 1,600 mm (5 ft 3 in)

Iarnród Éireann 2750 Class
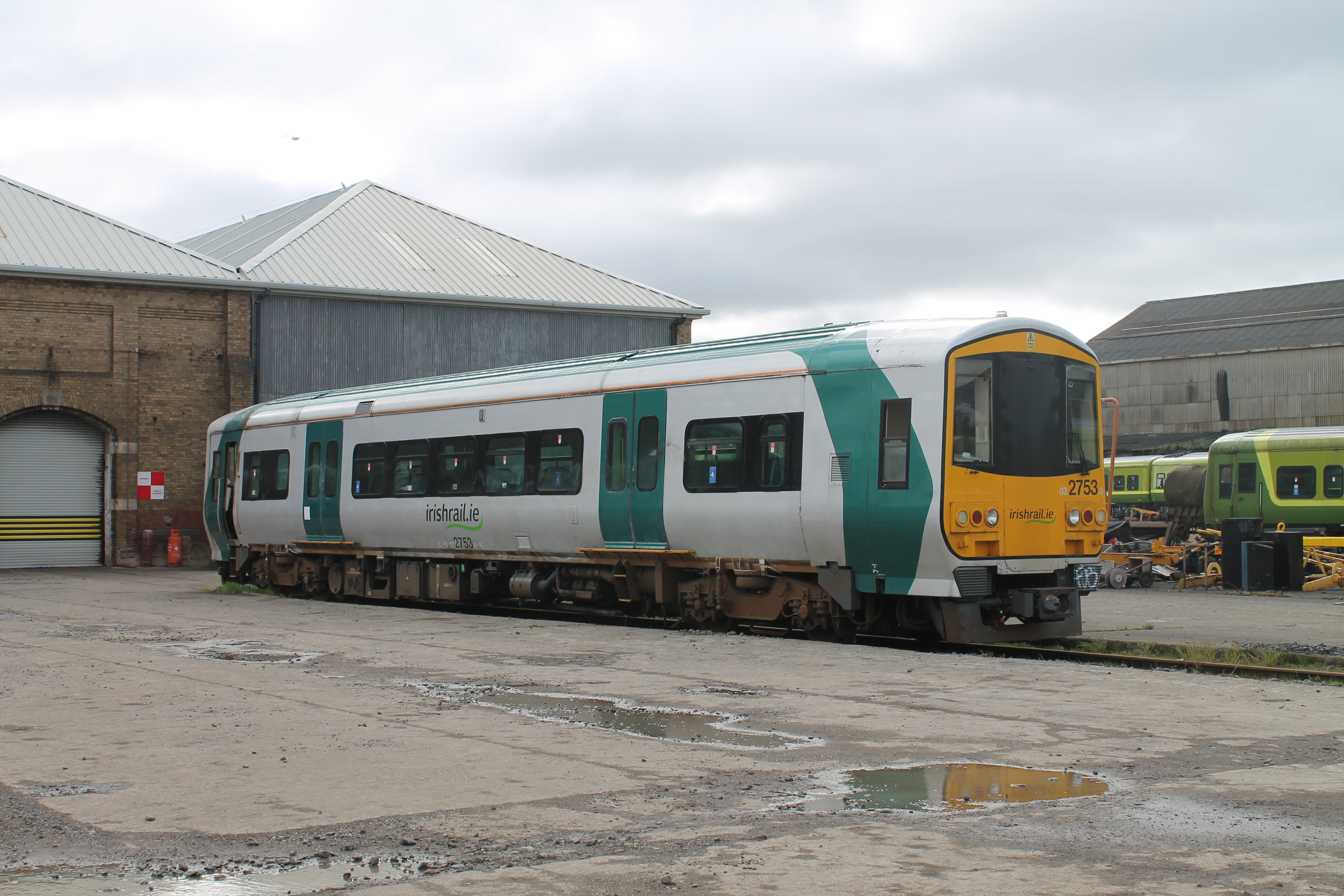
- 2753 stored at Inchicore Works in April 2016
- In service: 23 October 1998-10 August 2012
- Manufacturer: GEC Alsthom
- Family name: Alstom Commuter
- Constructed: 1997-1998
- Scrapped: 2025
- Number built: 2 carriages
- Number retired: 2
- Number preserved: 1, 2751
- Number scrapped: 1
- Formation: 1 Car
- Fleet numbers: 2751 & 2753
- Capacity: 53 seated
- Operator: Commuter
- Depots: Inchicore Works; Limerick

Specifications
- Car body construction: Steel
- Maximum speed: 110 km/h (68 mph)
- Weight: 40 tonnes (39 long tons; 44 short tons) per car
- Prime movers: Traction: Cummins NTA 855-R1, 350 bhp (260 kW). Aux. power: Cummins GB5.9GR / Iferca 61.5 kVA
- Braking systems: Air, 2 brake discs per axle
- Track gauge: 1,600 mm (5 ft 3 in)

The 2700 and 2750 Classes (nicknamed "Sparrows" [Spanish Arrows]) were two related types of diesel multiple unit operated by Iarnród Éireann. The 2700 Class units were 2-car sets; 25 cars were built by GEC Alsthom in 1997 and 1998, and began entering service in December 1998. Each car weighed 38 long tons (39 t; 43 short tons) and was fitted with a 350 hp (260 kW) underfloor Cummins engine with a maximum service speed of 110 km/h (68 mph).

== History ==
From July 2004 to April 2005 they were used in six-piece sets on the Dublin-Rosslare InterCity services, before being replaced by newer units. The entire class was then based in Limerick, with one set outbased in Ballina to operate the Ballina - Manulla Junction shuttle, while it also operated an Athlone - Galway service on Fridays. A further set operated morning and evening Athenry - Galway commuter services during its layover from Limerick - Galway services. Otherwise the class operated all services from Limerick (save direct Limerick-Heuston trains) and services from Limerick Junction to Waterford.

They were capable of operation in consists of up to 10 cars. In addition to the 2-car units, two single car units were constructed. These units were classed as 2750 Class, and had a cab at each end so that they could operate either singly or as part of a set.

Even numbered cars had 62 seats while odd numbered cars contained 55 seats and a toilet. There were some exceptions however; the two 2750 Class units had 53 seats each, due to having cabs at both ends, while 2719 and 2721 had 50 seats each and included a bicycle storage area. The original black and orange Arrow livery was replaced by the newly introduced Commuter livery in 2004, upon the start of the sectorisation of Iarnród Éireann's operations.

In 2010, Iarnród Éireann began major overhauls of the 2700 and 2750 Classes, the most prominent feature of which was the removal of the end gangways, which had been unused for some time. This coincided with the addition of a new livery based on the 22000 Class colour scheme.

2716 suffered collision damage on 3 June 2000. Following repairs, it was coupled with 2609, part of the 2600 class.

In July 2012, the majority of the class was withdrawn and put into storage; by September 2012 the entire fleet had been withdrawn and was put up for sale. As of 2018, the entire 2700 fleet remains decommissioned at Inchicore Works in Dublin and in the sheds at Cork Kent.

Irish Rail announced in 2016 that the 2700s were to be reintroduced into service around Limerick from 2018 to free up 22000 Class sets.

In October 2017, Irish Rail put out to tender the reactivation and refurbishment of 10 2700 sets, which were due to re-enter service in early 2019 in order to free up ICR sets for busier Dublin area services. However, this plan was cancelled in 2018.

During 2022, the 2700s stored at Inchicore were removed from the rails and stored off-track to make more space for other rolling stock.

Irish Rail would approve the scrapping of the fleet in August 2023.

Scrapping of the fleet commenced in Inchicore in March 2025, with the units stored in Cork being hauled to Inchicore in April. Carriages were cut up and sent to Louth for scrapping.

== Preservation ==
On 20 May 2024, 2751 was moved from Cork shed to Limerick for assessment and servicing as part of a project to reform 22000 class railcars with new intermediates at Laois Traincare depot. This plan did not proceed, and 2751 was returned to Cork shed. However, it was moved to Inchicore on 21 August 2025 and set aside for preservation by the Connemara Railway Project in Maam Cross, where it arrived in late August 2025. This was the only 2700 class to be preserved; all others have now been scrapped.

== Fleet details ==
Class	Operator	Number	Year built	Cars per Set	Unit nos.	Notes
2700 Class	Commuter	12	1997-1998	2	2701/02 – 2713/14, 2715/24, 2717/18, 2719/22, 2721/20, 2723/26	2716 operated as a hybrid 2-car unit with 2609 (Also withdrawn)
2750 Class	Commuter	2	1997-1998	1	2751 & 2753	2751 in preservation at Maam Cross, 2753 scrapped at Inchicore Works

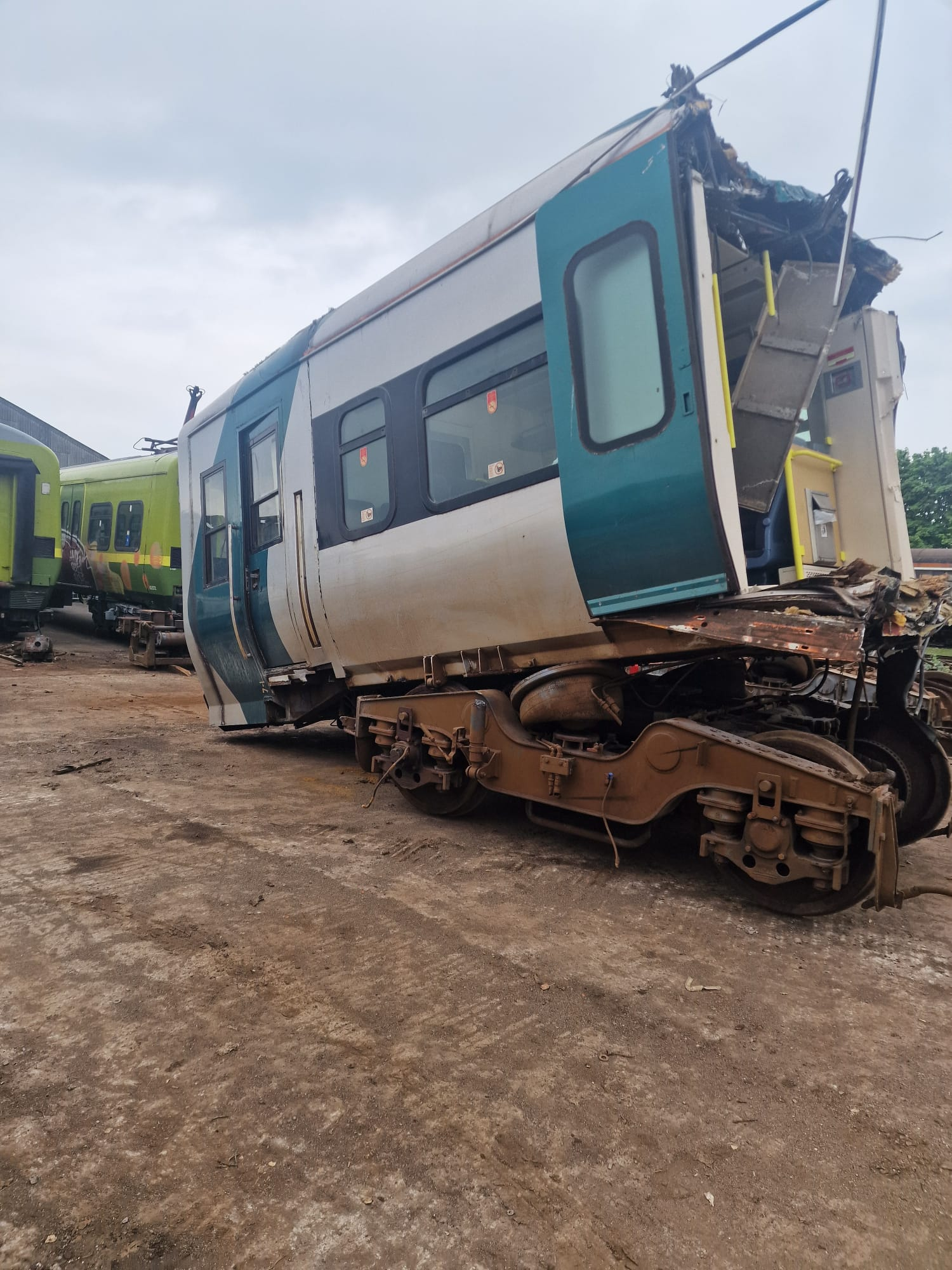
2718 Being scrapped in Inchicore Works May 2025

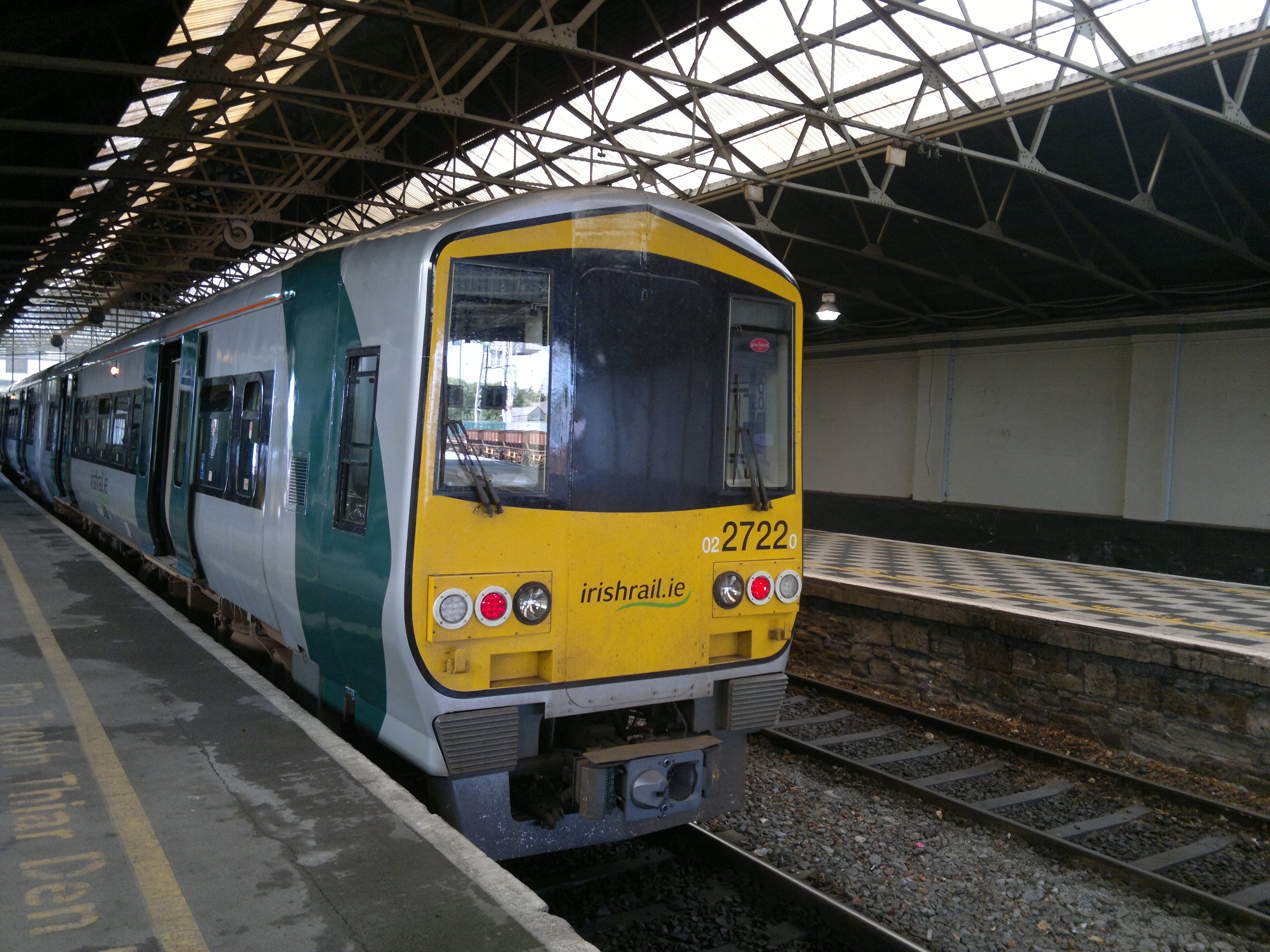
2722 at Limerick in 2011

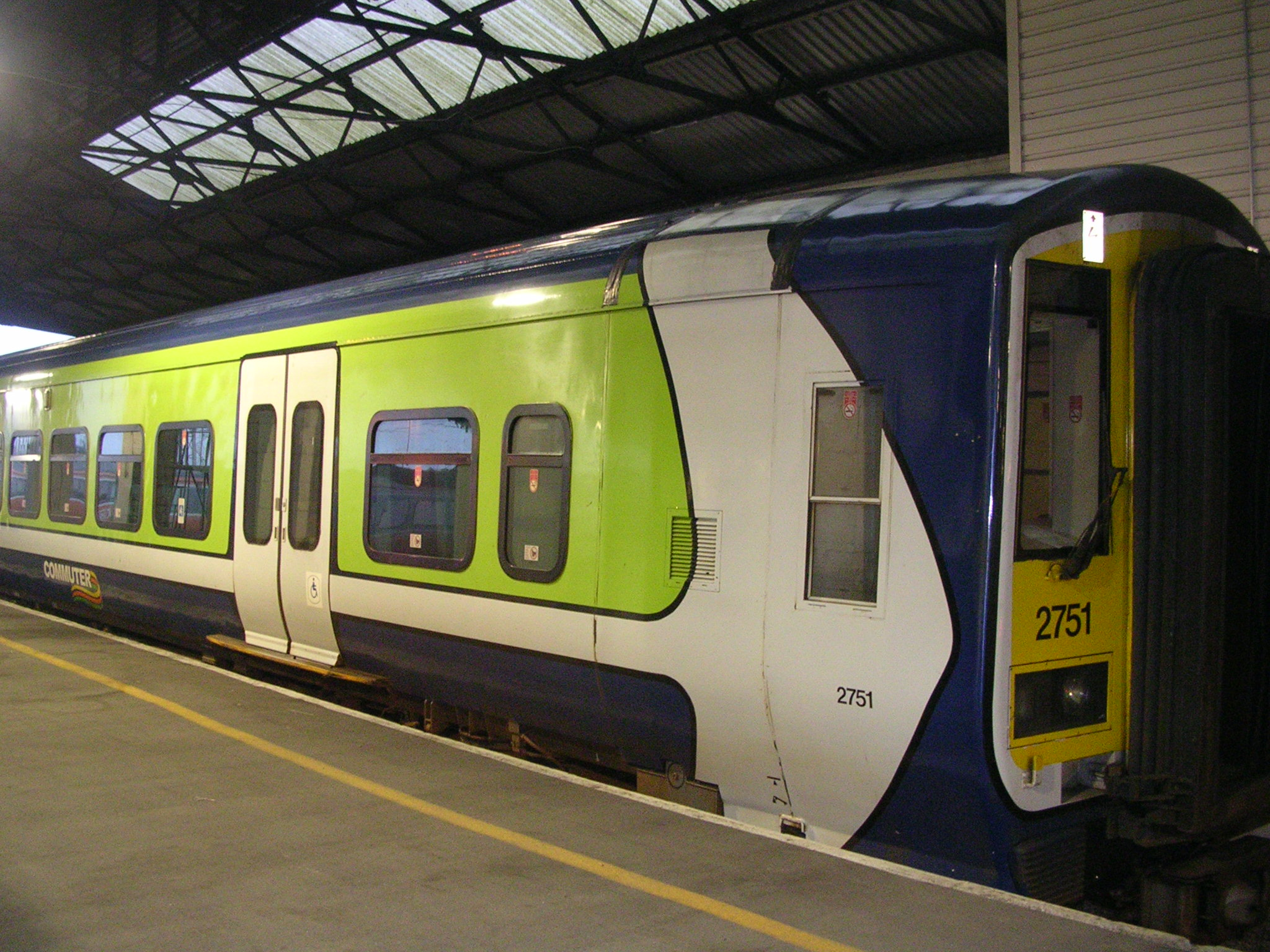
2751 at Limerick in 2006

== Models ==
Bachmann had produced a OO gauge model of 2715/2716 in the Commuter livery. However, this was done using a repainted British Rail Class 158 rather than accurate tooling to make the bodywork of the 2700 class.
