= Rail car =

Rail car may refer to:

- Railcar, a self-propelled single railway vehicle designed to transport passengers

In countries like Australia and Ireland, a "rail car" refers to a multiple-unit train:

- IÉ 22000 Class, alternatively named "InterCity Railcar"
- Railroad car, a non-powered single vehicle used for the carrying of cargo or passengers on a rail transport network
