= Moyross =

Suburb of Limerick, Ireland

Moyross Maigh Rois
- Suburban area
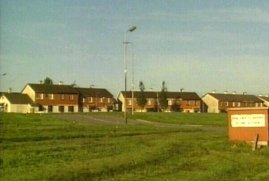
- Housing in Moyross

- Location in Ireland
- Coordinates: 52.681°N 8.647°W
- Country: Ireland
- Province: Munster
- City: Limerick
- Irish Grid Reference: R563590

Moyross (Irish: Maigh Rois) is a suburb and council estate in Limerick city in Ireland. Moyross is located on the city's north side and is the largest housing estate in Limerick.

The Roman Catholic parish of Moyross is one of 60 parishes in the Diocese of Limerick. As of the 2011 census, there were 2,183 people in Moyross parish.

== Development ==
Housing development in the area started in the 1970s and 1980s. Up to 2008, the estate was unusual in that it spanned two electoral areas, with 728 houses part of the Ballynanty DED of Limerick City Council, and 432 houses in the Limerick North Rural DED of Limerick County Council. The city boundaries have since been redrawn so that the whole estate is now covered by Limerick City and County Council. It comprises 1,160 houses which are divided into 12 parks.

In recent years, Moyross has seen major redevelopments and employment opportunities, such as a new extension to its community centre in 2018 to house the Credit Union, local enterprises and after-school facilities in a newer space. Housing projects have included the development of 57 new houses in Dalgaish and Cosgrave Parks in 2022, and 18 new houses in Cliona Park in 2023.

A proposed new private hospital, to be operated by UPMC, received planning permission in early 2024.

== Transport ==
Moyross is served by Bus Eireann services 303 and 306 to Limerick city centre.

The Northern Distributor Road, a road projected to connect Coonagh and Moyross with Knockalisheen in County Clare, was under development. As of 2024, however, the project had been omitted from the Limerick Shannon Metropolitan Area Transport Strategy (LSMATS) and the future of the road was uncertain.

In October 2022, proposals were announced to open a new train station in Moyross. As of mid-2024, a preferred location for the proposed station had been selected and a public consultation was undertaken between May and June 2024. A planning application for the proposed station was submitted by Irish Rail in August 2025, and this was approved by Limerick County Council in October 2025.

== Crime ==
Moyross has been associated in the media with anti-social behaviour, poverty and criminal gangs. Moyross gained notoriety with a decade-long cycle of incidents involving petrol bomb attacks, stabbings, murders and gun-related incidents, which reached a peak in 2006.

One incident that received much media attention in Ireland was the September 2006 petrol bomb attack of a car containing both a five-year-old and a seven-year-old child, which resulted in serious injuries to both after their mother turned down a request from youths for a lift to a courthouse. The crime illustrated the need for government attention in Moyross and the neglect faced by housing estates in the area, compared to more affluent areas of Limerick. John Fitzgerald, a former Dublin City manager, was appointed to lead an initiative to address issues of crime and exclusion in Moyross. The 'Fitzgerald Report' was released in 2007.

== People ==
- Keith Earls, retired rugby union player for Munster and Ireland
- Noel Hogan, lead guitarist and co-songwriter of The Cranberries
