= Castleconnell railway station =

Station in County Limerick, Ireland

Castleconnell Caisleán Uí Chonaill
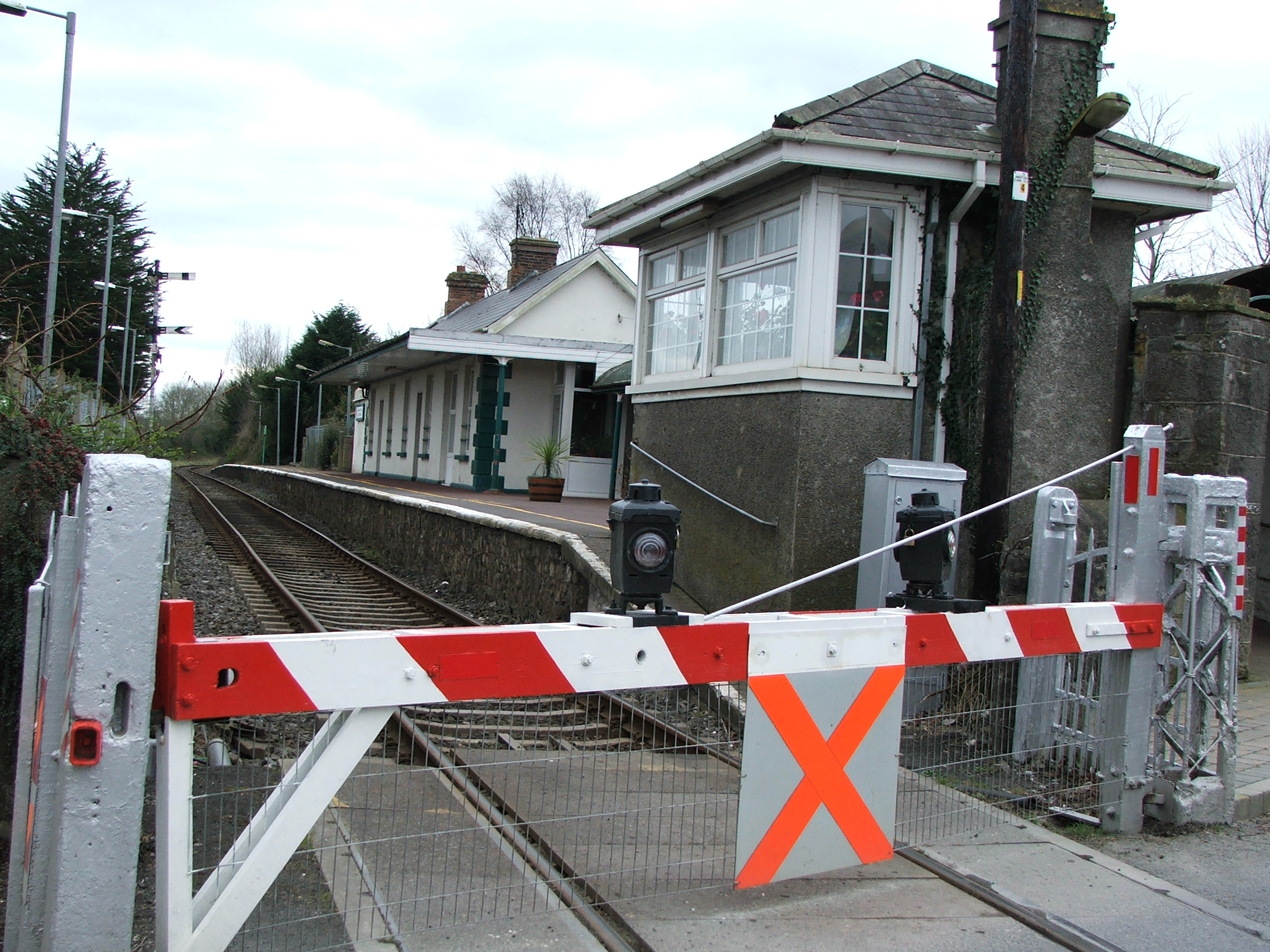
- Castleconnell Railway Station

General information
- Location: Castleconnell, County Limerick; Ireland
- Coordinates: 52.7131°N 8.4979°W
- Line: Limerick–Ballybrophy railway line

History
- Opened: 8 August 1858

Services
Preceding station	Iarnród Éireann	Following station
Limerick Colbert	Commuter; Limerick Suburban Rail	Birdhill
Location

Castleconnell railway station, opened on 8 August 1858 on the Great Southern and Western Railway line, serves the town of Castleconnell in County Limerick, Ireland.

It is on the Limerick–Ballybrophy railway line and is also served by a skeleton service on the Limerick to Nenagh Commuter Service. It is unstaffed and has a small car park.

== Train service ==
There are two week-day trains (early morning and early evening) from Castleconnell towards Ballybrophy (via Birdhill, Nenagh, Cloughjordan and Roscrea). There are also two week-day train services to Limerick.

== History ==
The station, on the Great Southern and Western Railway line, opened in August 1858.

A January 2012, national newspaper article suggested that Iarnród Éireann was expected to seek permission from the National Transport Authority to close the line. however in February 2012, an enhanced timetable was launched. In the revised timetable of February 2013 services were again reduced.

== Location ==
The station is located at the level crossing east of the centre of Castleconnell. It is near Castleconnell National School.
