= Sixmilebridge railway station =

Railway station in County Clare, Ireland

Coordinates: 52°44′16″N 8°47′03″W

Sixmilebridge railway station is a railway station that serves the village of Sixmilebridge in County Clare, Ireland. It is located on the Shannon Road less than 1 kilometre (0.6 mi) from the village.

All Limerick-Ennis and Limerick-Galway trains stop here.

== History ==
The station opened on 17 January 1859, and closed on 17 June 1963. The station reopened on 29 March 2010 as part of the rebuild of the Western Rail Corridor.

== Facilities ==
The station is unstaffed, with basic facilities provided, including a shelter and ticket machine

Preceding station	Iarnród Éireann	Following station
Limerick Colbert	InterCity; Western Railway Corridor	Ennis
Limerick Colbert	Commuter; Limerick Suburban Rail	Ennis
