= IÉ 2800 Class =

Irish InterCity and commuter diesel trains

Iarnród Éireann 2800 Class
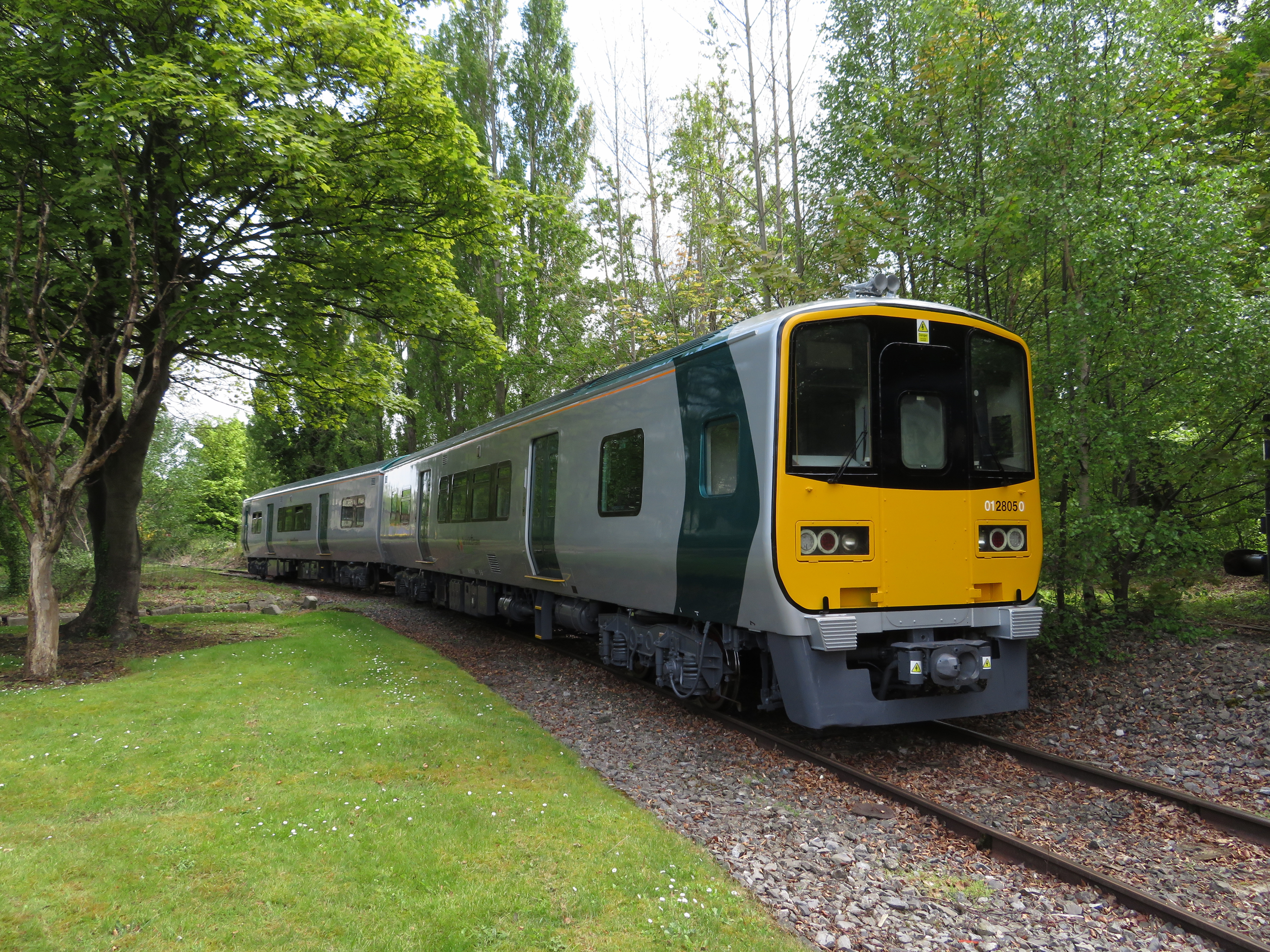
- 2805 at Inchicore in May 2022
- In service: 2000 – present
- Manufacturer: Tokyu Car Corporation
- Family name: Tokyu Commuter
- Constructed: 2000
- Number built: 10 trainsets
- Formation: 2 cars per trainset
- Fleet numbers: 2801/2802 – 2819/2820
- Capacity: 85 seated
- Operators: Commuter
- Depots: Limerick

Specifications
- Maximum speed: 75 mph (121 km/h)
- Prime mover(s): One Cummins NTA-855-R1 of 260 kW (349 hp) per car
- Transmission: Hydraulic
- Track gauge: 1,600 mm (5 ft 3 in); See Rail gauge in Ireland

The 2800 Class is a type of diesel multiple unit operated on the Irish railway network by Iarnród Éireann, used mainly for short-haul InterCity and Commuter services.

== Description ==
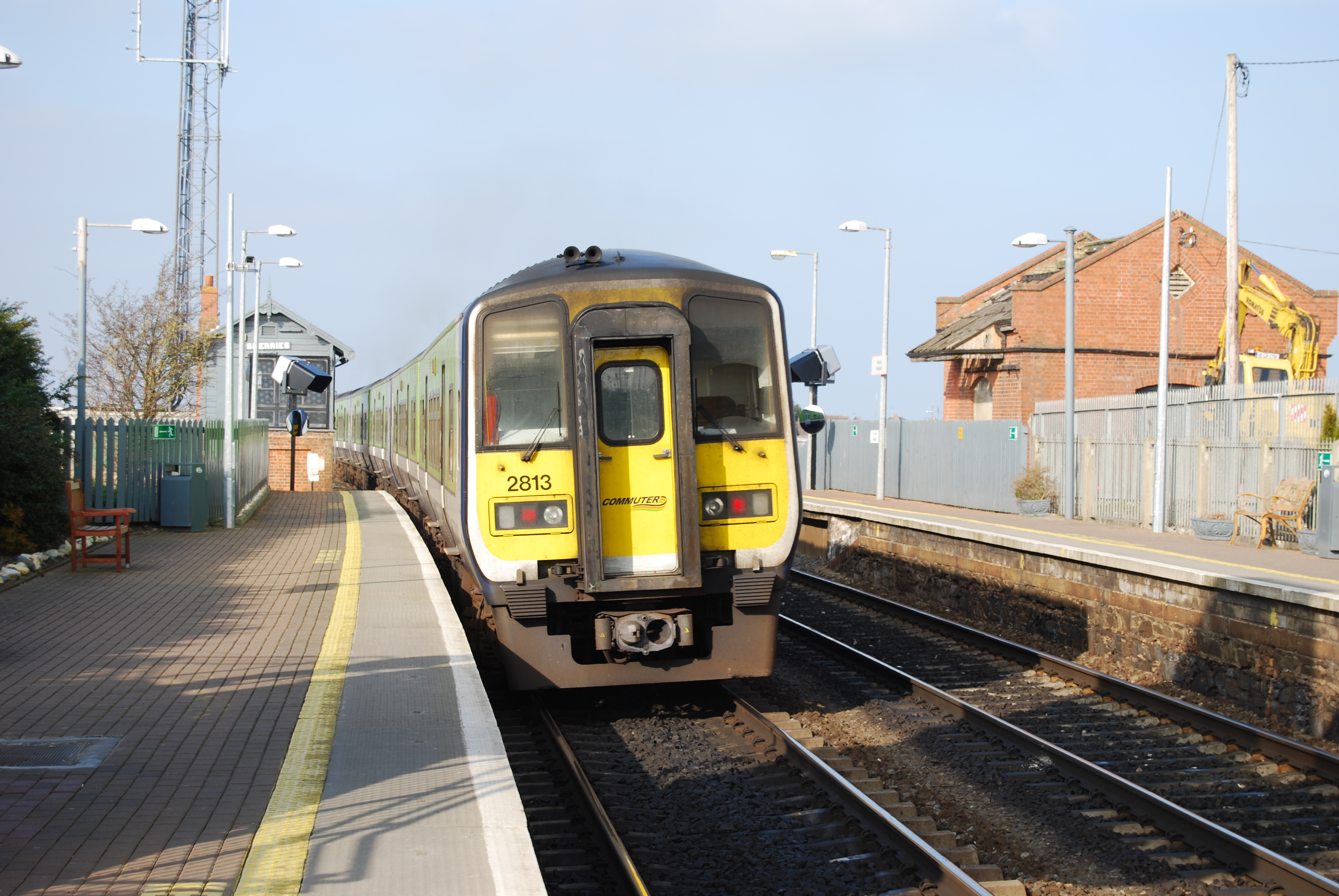
2813 departing Skerries on a service to Drogheda in 2008

The 2800 Class were built in Japan by Tokyu Car Corporation. Ten were built and entered into service in 2000. Like the 2600, 2700 and 2750 Classes, they were delivered in "Arrow" livery, however the Arrow logo was removed shortly after they entered service and replaced with the National Development Plan logo. The units were rebranded to Commuter livery from 2003. They were the last of the IÉ railcar fleet to retain the IÉ orange livery, the last unit being repainted into Commuter livery in late 2005. Although rare, the units can operate attached to 2600 class units. The 2800 Class were the first Irish trains to be fitted with PA systems which included both on-board announcements and message boards at either end of the coach. The 2800 Class underwent rebranding using a new livery with the silver green Irish Rail livery for use on InterCity routes. Following refurbishment, the cab-end gangways were removed.

== Deployment ==
The 2800 Class was bought for use on the Western Commuter (then Western Suburban) service, where they replaced the Cravens stock then used on the line in conjunction with the 2600 Class. This meant an end to the use of locomotive-hauled stock on the line. Although intended for this service, they were largely redeployed following the introduction of the 29000 Class which now mostly operates the line, along with the 22000 Class, which was introduced on the Western Commuter service in 2012. They now operate on a variety of lines. Because of their design, which allows movement between sets of multiple units working together, they were used on Rosslare line InterCity services where it was possible to run a minimal catering service on the line using these units. They were redeployed back onto Commuter services when the 22000 Class entered service on the Rosslare line. Since the 2800 Class were replaced with the 22000 Class on all Dublin Commuter services, the entire fleet was moved to Limerick. The 2800 Class now operate the following routes:

- Limerick-Ennis-Galway
- Limerick-Nenagh
- Limerick-Ballybrophy
- Limerick-Limerick Junction
- Manulla Junction-Ballina

They also operate on the Cork Commuter on occasions where they substitute for a 2600 class, but this is not a regular event.

- Cork-Cobh
- Cork-Midleton
- Cork-Mallow

== Fleet details ==
Class	Operator	Number	Year built	Cars per Set	Unit nos.
2800 Class	Commuter	10	2000	2	2801/2802 – 2819/2820
