= Commuter (Iarnród Éireann) =

Rail service in Ireland

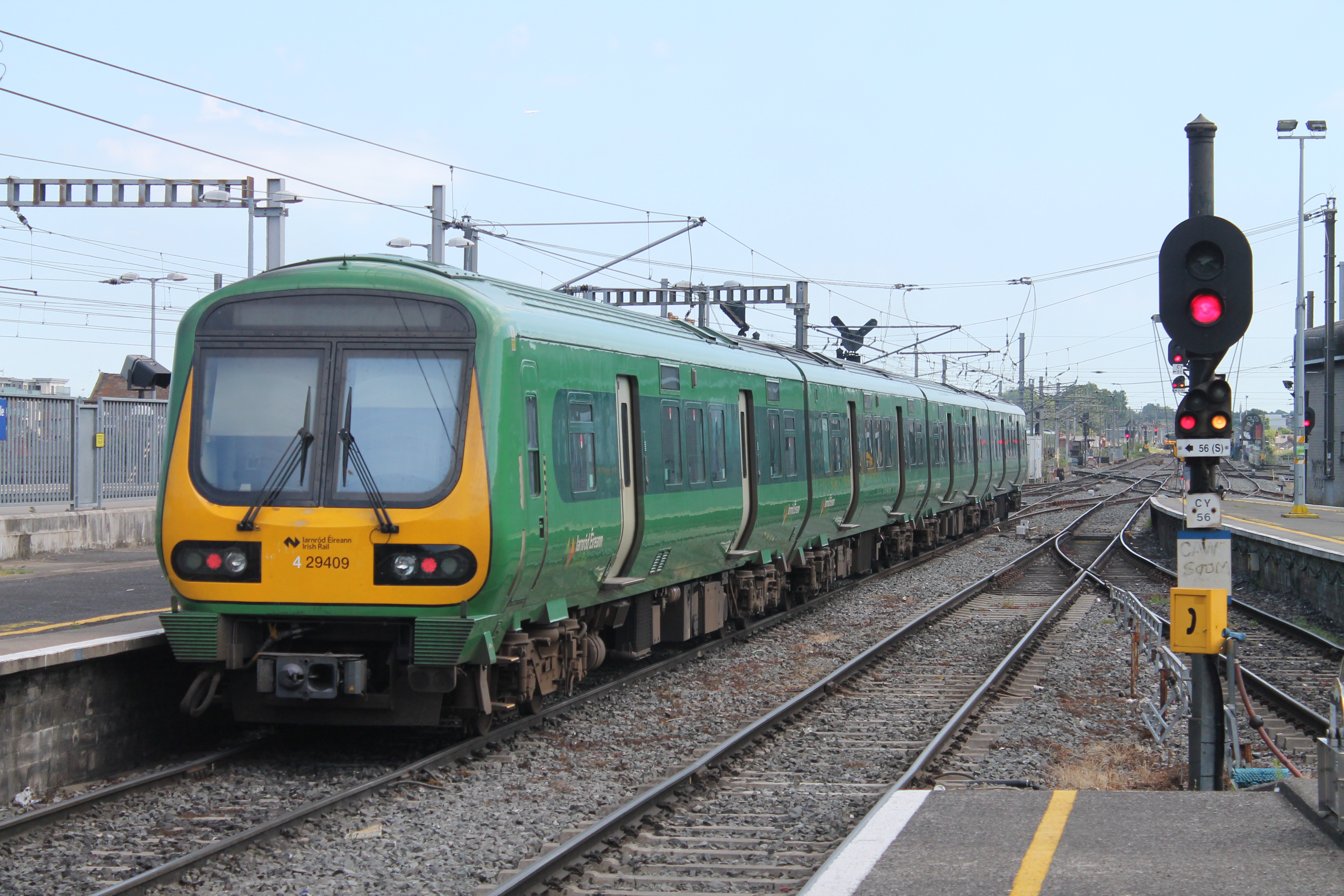
- 29000 Class (29009) Commuter train at Dublin Connolly

Overview
- Status: Operational
- Owner: Iarnród Éireann
- Locale: Greater Dublin Area; Cork
- Stations: 74

Service
- Type: Commuter rail, Suburban rail
- System: Iarnród Éireann
- Services: 7
- Operator(s): Iarnród Éireann
- Depot(s): Cork; Drogheda Depot; Limerick; Portlaoise Traincare Depot
- Rolling stock: 2600 Class; 2800 Class; 29000 Class; 22000 Class

History
- Opened: 16 May 1994 (As Arrow); 30 June 2003 (As Commuter)

Technical
- Number of tracks: 2–4
- Track gauge: 1,600 mm (5 ft 3 in)
- Operating speed: 120 km/h (75 mph); 160 km/h (99 mph) (Kildare services)

Commuter (Irish: Comaitéir) is a brand of suburban rail services operated by Iarnród Éireann in the Republic of Ireland, serving the cities of Dublin, Cork, Limerick and Galway. This brand is distinct from the longer distance InterCity brand, and Dublin's higher frequency DART brand. Most Commuter services share a track with InterCity services. During the first decade of the new millennium, Iarnród Éireann put a significant amount of effort into upgrading its network, with new tracks, signalling, station upgrades and trains. Commuter services are operated by diesel multiple unit train sets.

== History ==
=== Arrow ===
The brand was introduced on 16 May 1994 as 'Arrow', the first specific branding for diesel suburban services, with the launch of the Arrow brand on the newly opened Kildare line. This brand was applied to stations on the line, as well as the 2600 Class railcars. It was also applied to the 2700 Class and 2800 Class railcars upon their introduction (however in the case of the latter, it was removed shortly after their introduction into service and replaced with the National Development Plan logo). Thus the Arrow brand became the first major branding for suburban railway services in Dublin (officially, its use remained limited to the Kildare line, but Arrow branded or liveried trains were used on most suburban services).

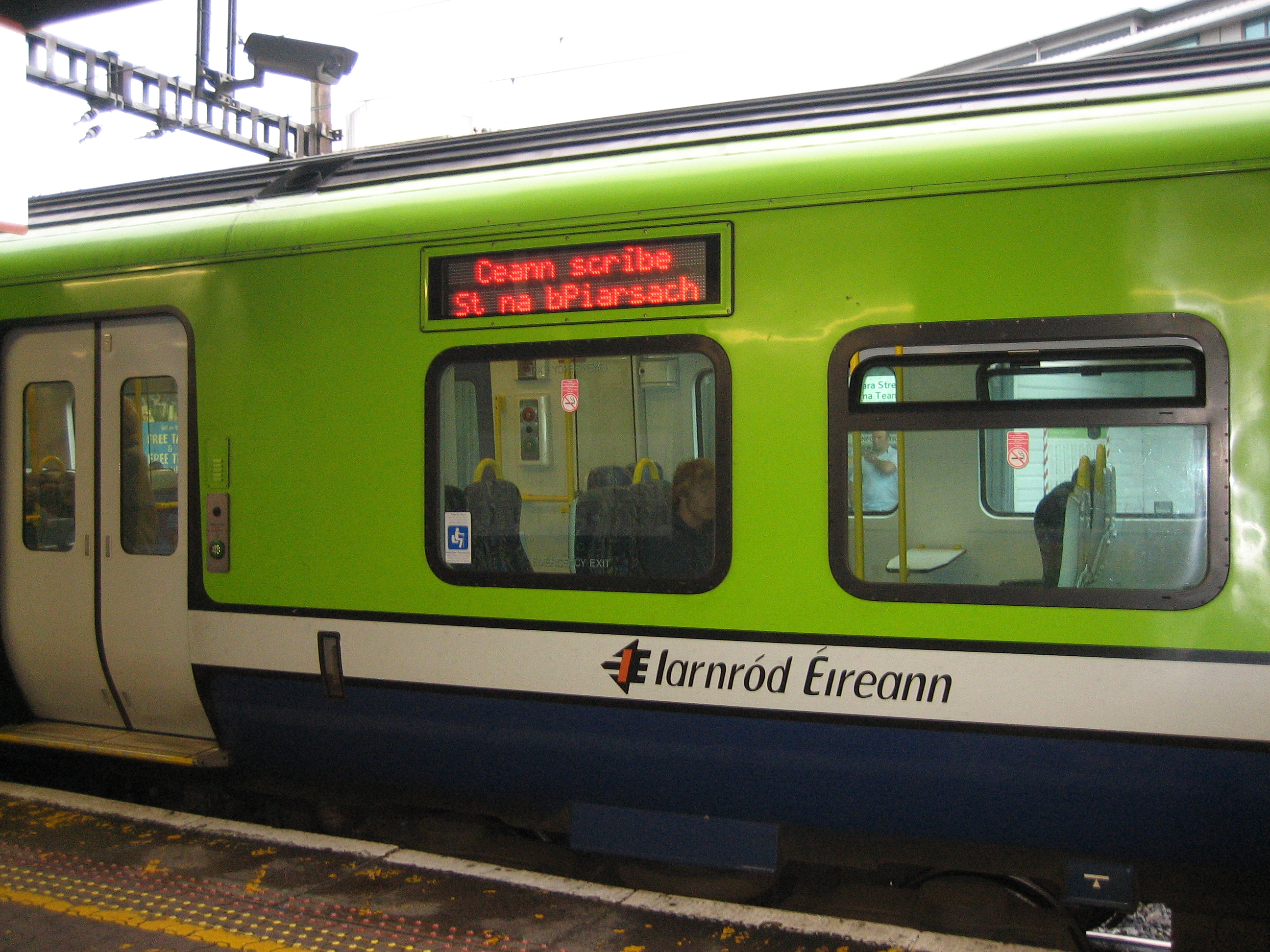
An IE Commuter 29000 Class at Tara Street Station, 2006. The LED Screen translated From Irish to English reads "Destination: Pearse Station

=== Commuter ===
On 30 June 2003, the Arrow brand was renamed 'Commuter', upon the introduction of the 29000 Class railcars and was also extended to the entire suburban railcar fleet. It was also used in some signage and advertising, giving the diesel commuter networks a consistent look for the first time. The Dublin railway system is now called "DART/Commuter" in line with the new brand, with the former Arrow brand having been completely phased out by 2007.

=== Rolling stock ===
In March 2007, IÉ placed an order for five additional 6-car 22000 Class DMU sets, totalling €79 million, to be added to its initial order of 150 cars. These additional trains are currently used on the outer Dublin suburban network to destinations including Portlaoise, Carlow and Athlone. A further order for an additional 51 cars, formed into 17 three-car units and totalling €140 million, was made in March 2009, for use to other suburban destinations, including Dundalk, Portlaoise, Longford and M3 Parkway.

In July 2007, IÉ announced that it was in the process of placing orders for a further 400 carriages. The bulk of these (up to 250 cars) was intended as EMUs to expand DART services. This project was cancelled in 2009.

The remainder, totaling up to 150 cars, consisted of DMU sets for the expansion of Commuter services in Cork and Limerick, as well as the long-distance Commuter sets for services in Leinster. These sets were introduced into revenue service from 2009 until April 2012, when the final deliveries took place.

=== Rebranding ===
In 2010, the 2600, 2700, and 2750 Classes began to be re-liveried from Commuter to a grey and green colour scheme with no reference to the Commuter brand. Instead, an Irish Rail logo referencing the then booking website was displayed on the side of the trains. In 2012, the 2800 Class was re-branded leaving only the 29000 Class in the Commuter livery. Then in 2014, the 29000 Class received a new all-over two-tone dark green livery. Since March 2013 the new bilingual logo has been introduced across the company's rolling stock, including the Commuter service. This is designed to eliminate customer confusion between the two names Iarnród Éireann and Irish Rail and create a more unified image.

== Services ==
=== Dublin ===
There are four commuter services serving Dublin along with the DART.

- Northern: This route operates from Dublin to Dundalk, with its central terminus at Dublin Connolly. The route is shared as far as Malahide with the DART service. The trains run on the Dublin–Belfast line.
- South Eastern: This route operates from Dublin to Gorey, with its terminus at Connolly Station, and is shared with the DART as far as Greystones. This route is shared with trains to Rosslare.
- Western: This route has two branches in the city centre; one starts at Docklands railway station, while the other starts from Dublin Pearse. The two converge at Broombridge, with the line going as far as Longford. In September 2010, services on this line were introduced from the Docklands to M3 Parkway.
- South Western: This route operates from Dublin to Portlaoise, with its central terminus at Dublin Heuston. In November 2016, services from Newbridge to Grand Canal Dock, which operate through the Phoenix Park Tunnel, were introduced on this line.

=== Cork ===
There are three suburban rail lines servicing the Greater Cork area, which comprise the Cork suburban network.

- Cork Kent–Mallow line. Stations at Kilbarry, Monard and elsewhere had been proposed for the future.
- Cork Kent–Cobh line calling at Little Island, Glounthaune, Fota Island, Carrigaloe and Rushbroke.
- Cork Kent–Midleton line calling at Carrigtwohill. It had been proposed to eventually extend the line to Youghal with intermediate stops at Mogeely and Killeagh.

=== Limerick ===
The Limerick commuter rail network consists of three suburban rail lines which comprise the Limerick suburban network.

- Limerick Colbert – Ennis line calling at Sixmilebridge
- Limerick Colbert – Nenagh line calling at Castleconnell and Birdhill. (This is a skeleton service)
- Limerick Colbert – Limerick Junction (for Tipperary town)

=== Galway ===
The Galway commuter rail network consists of one suburban rail service which comprises the Galway suburban network.

- Galway Ceannt–Athenry calling at Oranmore

=== Other ===
Other services operate between Mallow and Tralee, and Manulla Junction and Ballina. In addition, some InterCity services operate using Commuter branded DMUs – these include Dublin–Sligo and Dublin–Rosslare Europort services.

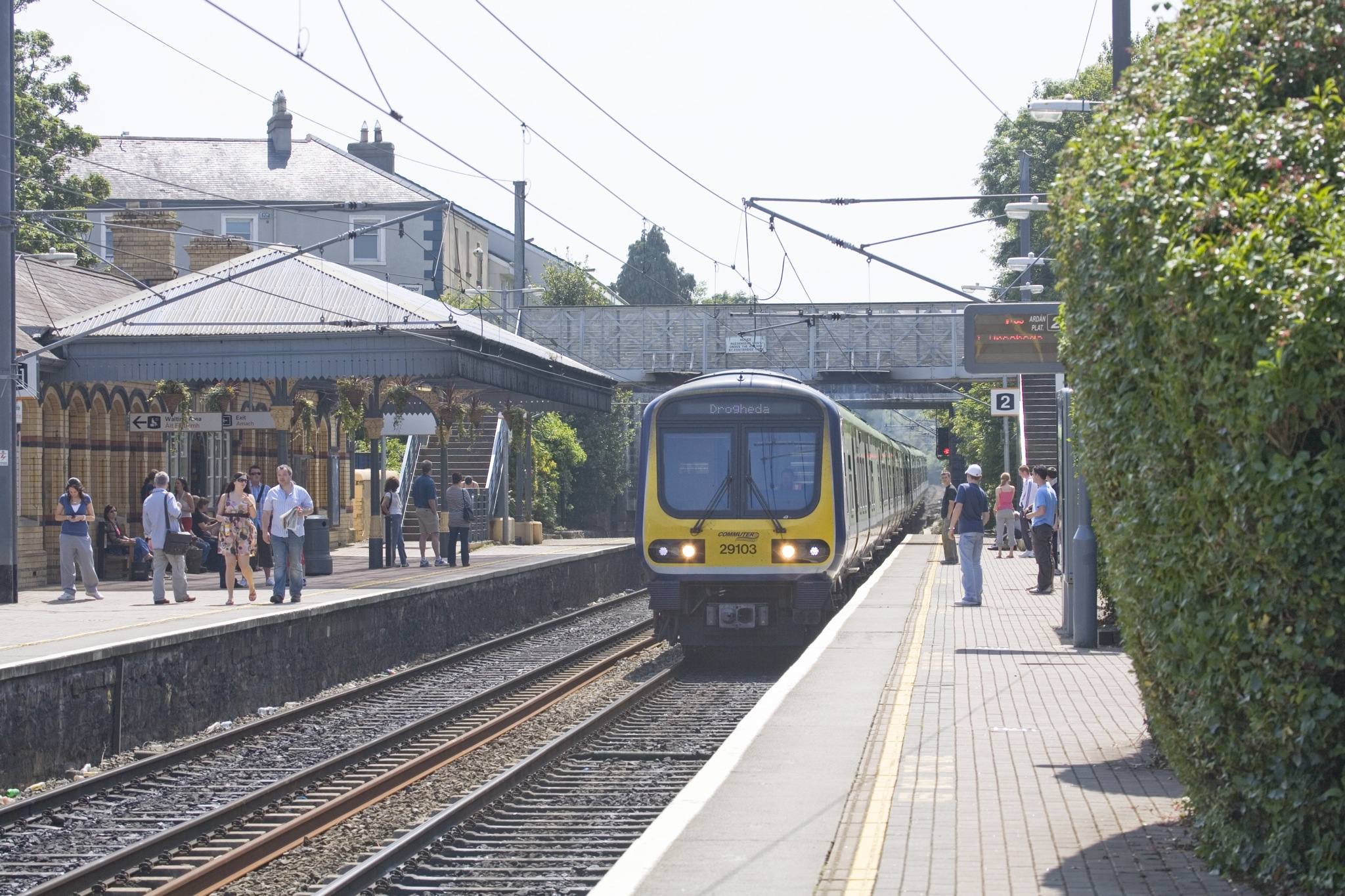
A 29000 Class DMU (29003) arriving at Malahide

== Rolling stock ==
Commuter services are operated primarily using DMU "railcars", with four separate classes operating on most routes:

=== Current fleet ===
Class	Image	Top speed		Number	Routes operated	Built	Notes
Class	Image	mph	km/h	Number	Routes operated	Built	Notes
2600 Class		70	110	8	Mallow-Cork-Cobh; Mallow-Tralee (Sundays only); Cork-Midleton	1993	2609 operated as a hybrid 2-car unit with 2716 (withdrawn in 2012)
2800 Class		75	120	8	Limerick-Waterford; Limerick-Limerick Junction; Limerick-Ennis; Limerick-Galway	2000	
29000 Class	29000 Class DMU	75	120	29	Dublin-Maynooth; Dublin-Dundalk; Dublin-Gorey; Dublin-M3 Parkway; Dublin-Longford	2002–2005	
22000 Class		100	160	28 (3-car); 25 (4-car); 10 (5-car)	Dublin-Maynooth; Dublin-M3 Parkway; Dublin-Kildare-Portlaoise; Dublin-Longford; Dublin-Rosslare; Dublin-Dundalk; Limerick-Limerick Junction; Limerick Junction-Waterford	2007–2011	Also used on InterCity services

=== Former Fleet ===
Class	Image	Top speed		Number	Routes operated	Built	In service	Notes
Class	Image	km/h	mph	Number	Routes operated	Built	In service	Notes
2700 Class		110	68	12	All routes	1997–1998	1998–2012	2716 operated as a hybrid 2-car unit with 2609 (also withdrawn); all stored at Inchicore Works and Cork Kent railway station
2750 Class		110	68	2	All routes	1997–1998	1998–2012	2751 is now preserved at maam cross Connemara Railway & 2753 scrapped at Inchicore works

=== Operation ===
All of the DMU types can operate either independently or can be attached to another set of their own class or of another class to form trains of up to ten cars.

In addition to the DMUs, locomotive-hauled coaches supplemented services. The introduction of the 22000 Class units on InterCity services allowed the 2800 Class and 29000 Class units to be cascaded to Commuter services, which allowed the locomotive hauled stock to be fully phased out by 2009.

Eventually, since all 63 22000 Class railcars were delivered in 2012, they operate all InterCity and some Commuter services in Dublin, excluding the Dublin-Cork route and the Dublin-Belfast route.

== Future ==
Irish Rail is due to undertake a major expansion of its Commuter services from 2020.

=== Rolling stock ===
Over 600 new bi-mode and electric coaches are due to arrive starting from late 2023, as stated in the Invitation to Tender issued in May 2019.

=== Infrastructure ===
Under this plan, several commuter lines will be refurbished and re-opened – plans include:

- Reinstating a rail service to Navan which will connect with the Western Commuter Line into Dublin.
- Expanding the Cork suburban network with new stations between Cork and Mallow.
- Reopening the Western Rail Corridor between Limerick and Sligo in stages. Ennis to Athenry is complete.

Feasibility studies have also been made into the possibility of creating airport links to several airports; a link to Ireland West Airport is a long-term aim of the Western Rail Corridor project while a feasibility study into a link to Shannon Airport from Limerick was commissioned by Iarnród Éireann in 2006.

==== Other proposals ====
There have been calls by outside groups for other railway refurbishments to enhance commuter services:

- Drogheda-Navan – The pressure group Rail Users Ireland have been critical of plans to reinstate the line to Navan in two stages, which would leave the town without a direct rail service until 2030. As of 2007, they had called for the refurbishment of the line between Navan and Drogheda, then used by freight trains, to be reopened for passenger services.
- Mullingar-Athlone – There have also been calls, including from the Midland Railway Action Group, for the reopening of the link line that connects the Dublin-Sligo main line at Mullingar (into Dublin Connolly) and the Dublin-Galway/Westport main line at Athlone (into Dublin Heuston), restoring the railway network to the town of Moate, which had been recommended in the strategic review which led to the Transport 21 proposals.

== See also ==
- Dublin Suburban Rail
- Cork Suburban Rail
- Galway Suburban Rail
- Limerick Suburban Rail
