= Limerick Junction railway station =

Station in County Tipperary, Ireland

Limerick Junction Gabhal Luimnigh
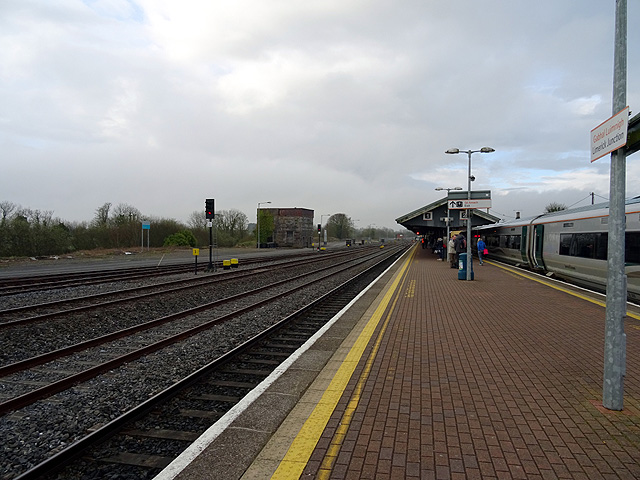
- Looking south in 2016 before platform four was built in 2019. The lines are from right to left are: station access loop; Dublin (up) line; and Cork (down) line.

General information
- Location: Limerick Junction, County Tipperary; E34 E984; Ireland
- Coordinates: 52°29′58″N 8°12′04″W
- Owner: Iarnród Éireann
- Operator: Iarnród Éireann
- Platforms: 4
- Bus operators: Bus Éireann; TFI Local Link
- Connections: 55; 347; 855

Construction
- Structure type: At-grade

Other information
- Station code: 16
- Fare zone: N

History
- Opened: 3 July 1848

Key dates
- 2007: Number of platforms reduced to three
- 2011: Signalling upgraded to CTC
- 2019: New platform opened
Services
Preceding station	IÉ	Following station
Thurles	InterCity; Dublin-Cork railway line	Charleville
Thurles	InterCity; Dublin-Tralee Main Line	Mallow
Terminus	InterCity; Limerick-Rosslare railway line	Tipperary
Limerick Colbert	Commuter; Limerick Line Shuttle	Terminus
Location

Limerick Junction (Irish: Gabhal Luimnigh) is the interchange railway station for trains originating in Limerick, Dublin Heuston, Cork, Waterford, Tralee and Ennis stations. The station opened on 3 July 1848.

The station was highly noted for its layout which prior to 1967 required every train making a stop at the station to make a reversal to do so. The latest changes in 2019, including the addition of a new island platform, mean only trains to and from the Waterford direction need to reverse before and after accessing the station.

== Location ==
The station is located in the townland of Ballykisteen, County Tipperary, Ireland, in the county's historical barony of Clanwilliam. It is 21 miles (34 km) from Limerick City, 107 miles (172 km) from Dublin Heuston, and 58 1/4 miles (93.7 km) from Cork. Tipperary town is about 3 miles (5 km) away to the south-east, and the station was originally named "Tipperary Junction". The station lies just of the N24 road from Limerick to Waterford. Tipperary Racecourse lies just to the west of the station. Locally, the station is sometimes informally called "The Junction".

Beyond a cluster of railway cottages there has been no development of a village around the station, though there is a public house, and the settlement would be considered a small hamlet.

== Services ==
There are 48 trains on a weekday to 6 destinations: 17 trains to Dublin Heuston, 13 to Cork, 2 to Waterford, 11 to Limerick and 3 to Ennis .

There is an hourly train to Limerick, with some services extended to Ennis or Galway. Most trains operating between Dublin and Cork or vice versa stop here.

== Buses ==
Amongst other bus services, Local Link route 855 stops at Limerick Junction Railway Station (the timetable is 855 – (T41) Tipperary Town to Cashel via Cahir & Limerick Junction Timetable).

== Layout ==
Because of its complex layout it has a special place in railway lore: it is the only remaining railway junction in Ireland where two lines cross at a near-90-degree angle, the other being the "Dundalk Square" crossing near Dundalk. One route is the Dublin-Cork main line, while the other is the line from Limerick to Waterford. Trains from all four locations are served, some connecting to Ennis in County Clare and Tralee in County Kerry.

The layout consists of four platforms, all of which are in use. The main line platform, number 1, is a through platform and primary use is for trains from Cork which access the station from a loop off of the main "up" line to Dublin. It is also possible for trains from Dublin, Limerick or Waterford to access the Platform 1 if required. The terminal platform, to the west of Platform 1, is numbered 2 and 3 for parts nearest and furthest from the buffers respectively. This allows two trains to be present at once, typically allowing a Waterford train and Limerick train to be simultaneously present. Access to Platforms 2 and 3 for trains from anywhere other than Limerick requires reversing. A train coming from Waterford must cross the Dublin-Cork main line towards Limerick, reversing along the curve used by trains arriving from Limerick. It can then stop at the Limerick bay.

Platform 4, added in 2019, is used by trains from Dublin towards Cork. The platform is accessed by footbridge from platform with lifts to the upper level also provided. A disadvantage with platform 4 is that cross platform interchange of trains is no longer possible.

== History ==
The station opened on 3 July 1848 as the latest extension of the GS&WR line from Dublin to Cork, connecting to the Waterford and Limerick Railway (W&LR) at the same time which had opened to Tipperary from Limerick some two months previously. The station was owned by the GS&WR, the W&LR paying rent for use.

== Pre-1967 ==
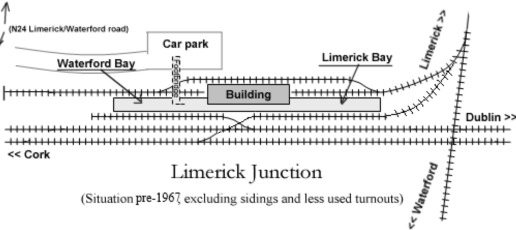
Limerick Junction pre 1967 (simplified). (Note: Diagrams are a not-to-scale reasonable representation of the key elements of the layout but omit some siding, points and yards. See for example (Casserley,1974, p.46) for a more comprehensive diagram.) (Note: (Ahrons,1954, p.16) referring to pre-1900 claims a continuous line along the main platform with points back to the main line from the centre where (Casserley,1974, p.46) and Murray & McNeill, 1976, p.174) indicate curves at that point)

The original layout was soon altered to the one that was to remain until 1967, requiring all trains to reverse to access the station. Trains from the W&LR would arrive at the station prior to and leave after than those from the GS&WR. It was common for trains to Dublin and Cork to be arranged to across at the same time, with 10 minutes being allowed for the stop, and the locomotives for Dublin and Cork facing each other, four trains being in the station at the same time.

The W&LR briefly in 1880 constructed a platform at Keane's points, where its trains left the W&LR line to the GS&WR station, leaving passengers to walk to the GS&WR platform.

In 1955 the crossing from the Cork platform to the down line was changed from a diamond crossing to a ladder crossing. The change, made to support a new cement train service, meant that a train coming from Cork could proceed directly to Limerick without reversal.

== 1967 ==
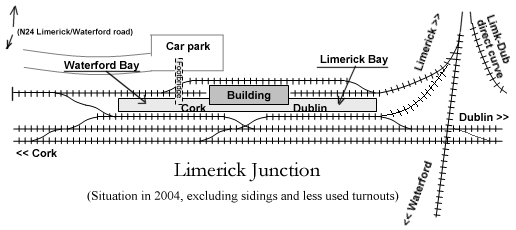
Limerick Junction 1967–2007 (simplified)

The 1967 changes were, at least in part, initiated by the closure of the Waterford–Mallow railway line and subsequent diversion of the Rosslare to Cork boat trains to run over Waterford to Limerick line instead. Also in 1967 a short curve was constructed just north of Limerick Junction allowing through main line trains between Limerick and Dublin without reversal at Ballybrophy or Limerick Junction itself, trains using the direct curve being unable stop at the station. The curve is only used by three trains each way per day since the most recent timetable changes in December 2009. Through running (without reversal) from Limerick to Mallow and Cork is possible.

The station at Limerick Junction is surrounded by track. Trains accessing the Waterford bay from Limerick or Waterford must reverse into the platform. Trains from Waterford also reverse back from "Keane's points", where the curve out from the station joins the line.

== 2007 ==
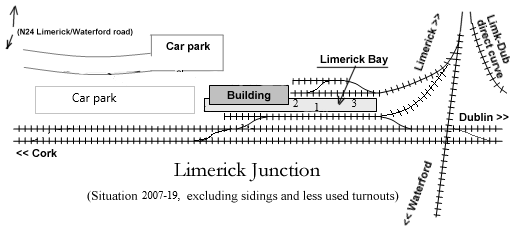
Limerick Junction 2007–2019 (simplified)

c. 2007 the platform south of the station building was truncated leaving to elimination of the "Waterford Bay" with the vacated area being allocated to a car park.

The line skirting to the west of the station to the Waterford Bay became disused from 2006. The track layout here has been reduced to now only two platforms. The bay platform to the north is used for trains to Limerick and Waterford/Rosslare and the main line platform is used for Dublin to Cork trains. The Waterford bay, which was located at the south end of the station, is now lifted and the so has the line that ran behind the station. The scissor crossover which is located halfway down the mainline platform is due to be lifted and the south loop of the mainline has now been disconnected. The Cork half of the through platform has also been removed and the area used to extend the car park.

== 2019 ==
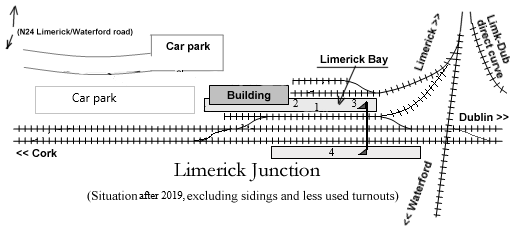
Limerick Junction from 2019 (simplified)

A new platform 4 became operational on 25 August 2019. Associated works included a new 20 metre span footbridge, passenger shelters and seating and new lighting. The platform, measuring 260 metres, has removed the constraints and speed restrictions associated with the former single platform which catered for all Dublin to Cork/Kerry services in both directions. Improved journey times of up to five minutes for Dublin to Cork/Kerry services, and of up to 11 minutes for Limerick to Cork/Dublin services due to improved connections will be delivered over time, the company hopes. A new footbridge with high capacity lifts was also built, catering for customers transferring to the new platform. The investment was worth €3.5m to the station. The planning application for the new platform and associated works was submitted to Tipperary County Council in April 2018, with planning permission granted in June 2018. Works were completed both between trains and during railway possessions.

== Horse racing ==
Limerick Junction was also the name of the racecourse at the same location. In 1986 it was renamed Tipperary Racecourse. The course is not conducive to winter racing because of the frequency of water-logging. Racing here is a major attraction during the summer months and large crowds are attracted to the venue, especially for the Thursday evening meetings.

== See also ==
- Kilkenny: A station accessed by reversal
- Killarney: A station accessed by reversal
- Athenry: A station accessed by reversal with regards to one route only
- List of railway stations in Ireland
- History of rail transport in Ireland
- Rail transport in Ireland
