= Limerick Colbert railway station =

Railway station in Limerick, Ireland

Limerick Colbert Stáisiún Uí Cholbáird
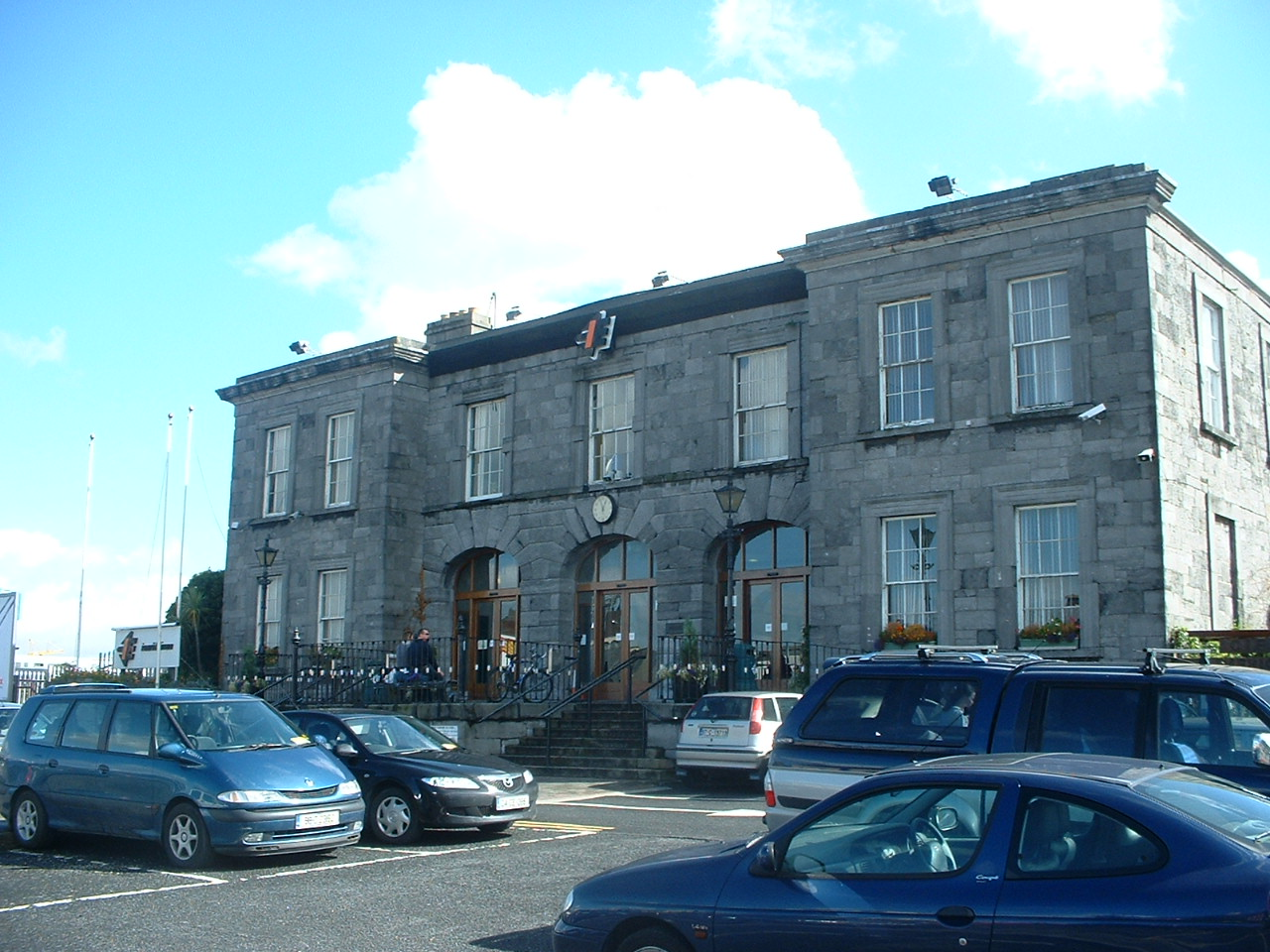
- Limerick Railway Station

General information
- Location: Parnell Street, Limerick, V94 H2PP; Ireland
- Coordinates: 52.6589°N 8.6246°W
- Owner: Iarnród Éireann
- Operator: Iarnród Éireann
- Platforms: 4
- Bus operators: Bus Éireann; TFI Local Link
- Connections: 13; 14; 51; 55; 72; 301; 303; 304A; 306; 314; 317; 317A; 318; 320; 321; 323; 323X; 328; 329; 330X; 332; 343; 345; 347

Construction
- Structure type: At-grade

Other information
- Station code: 40

History
- Opened: 1858
- Former names: Limerick Station

Key dates
- 1966: Renamed Limerick Colbert station
Services
Preceding station	IÉ	Following station
Terminus	InterCity; Dublin–Cork railway line	Thurles
Terminus	Commuter; Limerick Suburban Rail	Castleconnell
Terminus	Commuter; Limerick Suburban Rail	Limerick Junction
Terminus	InterCity; Western Railway Corridor	Sixmilebridge
Terminus	Commuter; Limerick Suburban Rail	Sixmilebridge
Location

Limerick railway station also known as Colbert Station (Irish: Stáisiún Uí Cholbáird) or Limerick Colbert serves the city of Limerick in County Limerick, Ireland. It is on Parnell Street and is the main station on the Limerick Suburban Rail network. It has approximately 2,500 rail passengers a day travelling on four rail routes. The Bus Éireann bus station on site services approximately one million passengers a year, with 125 buses departing each day.

== Services ==
The station is the terminus of the Dublin–Limerick, Limerick–Nenagh–Ballybrophy and Limerick–Ennis–Galway lines. Connections for Cork, Clonmel, Carrick-on-Suir, Waterford and Kerry stations, such as Killarney, Farranfore and Tralee can be made at Limerick Junction.

Bus Éireann's Limerick depot is adjacent and offers Intercity, Express and Eurolines services.

== Connecting to Shannon Airport ==
The 343 and 51 buses connect the railway station to Shannon Airport.

== History ==
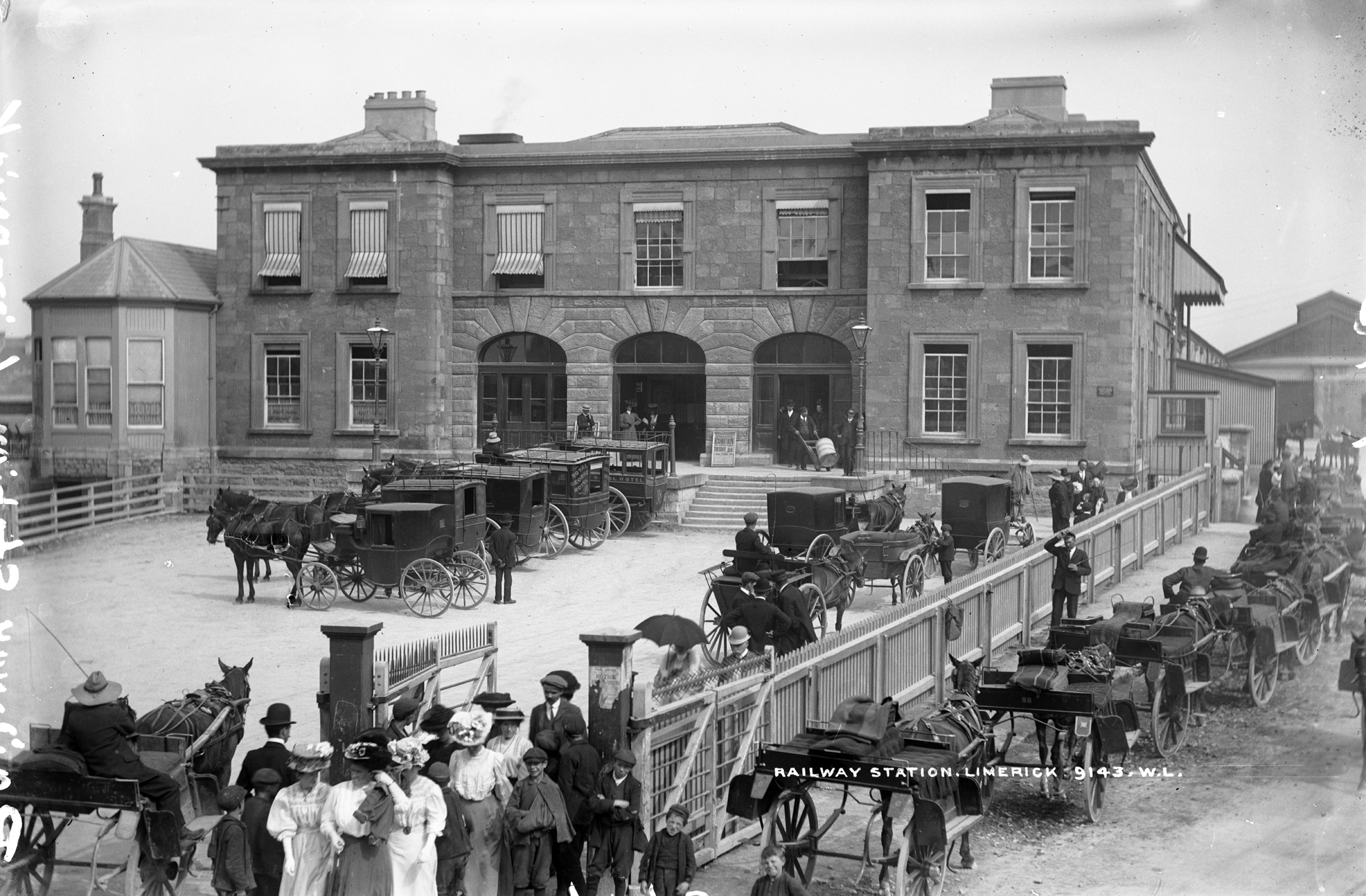
The station in 1907.

The station opened on 28 August 1858, replacing a temporary station 500 metres (1,600 ft) further east, which had operated from 9 May 1848. It was built by the Waterford and Limerick Railway (W&LR), which ran its first train, as far as Tipperary, on Tuesday, 9 May 1848, with intermediate stations at Killonan, Pallasgreen and Oola (all since closed). Two months later the GS&WR connected their Dublin–Cork line with the W&LR at Limerick Junction, near Tipperary. The work was carried out at the height of the Great Famine, resulting in extreme financial difficulties for the company.

Originally named "Limerick", the station was given the name Colbert on 10 April 1966 in commemoration of Cornelius Colbert, one of the executed leaders of the Easter Rising of 1916.

Other former routes from Limerick station included:

- a direct route to Cork via Patrickswell and Charleville (on the Dublin-Cork line) built by the Cork & Limerick Direct Railway
- the "North Kerry" line to Foynes, Newcastle West, Listowel and Tralee built in stages by three different companies in the mid to late 19th century
- a siding from Limerick Check to Castlemungret cement factory.

The direct line to Cork between Patrickswell and Charleville and the North Kerry line between Ballingrane and Tralee were dismantled in the [late 1960s - to be confirmed] and in the late 1980s respectively. A single-track remains in place between Limerick Check and Foynes, although disconnected from the network.

In 2022 work began to reopen the line to Foynes as a freight railway, with work scheduled to be completed in 2024.

Parts of the video for the Westlife song "My Love" were filmed at Colbert Station.

== Redevelopment ==
Conditional planning permission was granted by Limerick city and county council for the €16.8m redevelopment of Colbert Station in December 2014.

Plan included:

- Phase 1. A new pedestrian plaza limestone paved area of 3,350 square metres (0.83 acres) replacing the car park at the front of the station.
- Phase 2. Knocking the former toilet block to make way for a new bus station, with the former bus station being converted into the access area for a new 235-space car park.
- Phase 3. Significant refurbishment of the interior of the railway station with new finishes throughout and provision of a new ticketing office and retail units.

Funding of approximately 3 million euro was secured for Phase 1 and work began in Quarter 1, 2015. The disused Fuel Station site was leveled and work completed on-site for a temporary car park in summer/autumn 2015. The temporary parking was used while work on station redevelopment took place. Phase 1 was completed in 2016.

During June 2017, extensive re-signalling works took place at Limerick Colbert. These works replaced two life-expired signal cabins that signaled all routes into and out of the station. During this time, platforms 3 and 4 were also straightened, lengthened and resurfaced.

In October 2017, one of the former Station Signal cabins was demolished to facilitate the extension of Platforms 1 and 2. Buffer stop arrangements to comply with modern safety requirements, similar to those on Platforms 3 & 4 were also provided for.

Separately Limerick council sought in 2015 to redevelop the Parnell Street area including the interface between the street and Colbert station. Plans included a raised platform and new pedestrian crossing across Parnell Street at the entry to Colbert Station to complement the new pedestrian plaza. Work was completed in 2017.

=== Colbert Station Redevelopment (2024) ===
In 2024, a new bus station for Bus Éireann vehicles opened, connecting the new bus station with the current railway station through a concourse previously occupied by the toilet block. The new terminal has 20 bus bays with digital information screens as well as new signage, seating, ticket office, machines and staff facilities. The former bus station is being redeveloped to create a 326-space car park with bike parking for 264 bicycles. The interior of Colbert Station is being redeveloped similarly, with new flooring, a new ticket office, doors and retail units being installed/refurbished.

== See also ==
- List of railway stations in Ireland
- Limerick Suburban Rail
- Great Southern and Western Railway
- History of rail transport in Ireland
