= IÉ 22000 Class =

Class of an Irish rail trainset

Iarnród Éireann 22000 Class
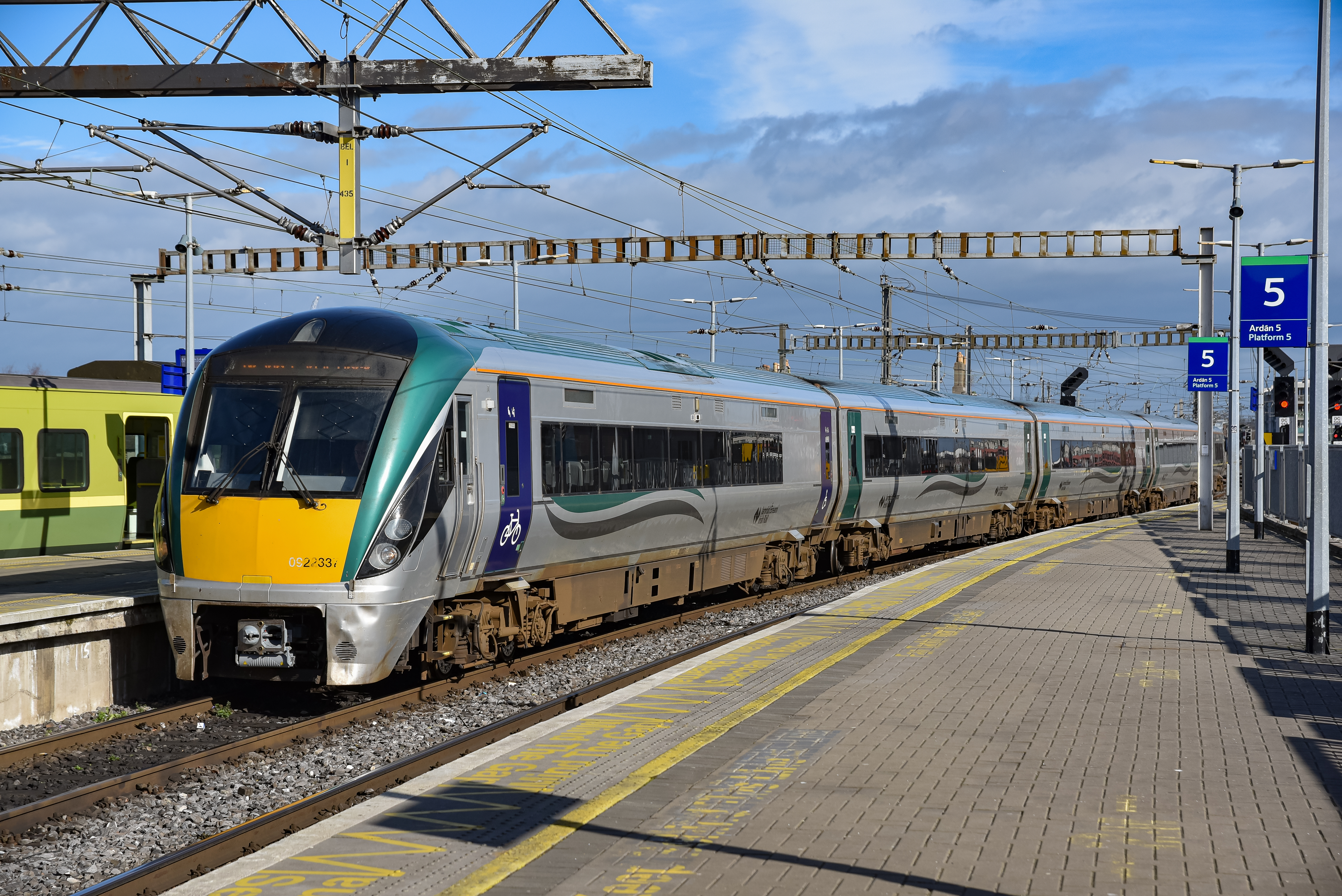
- 22337 at Dublin Connolly in February 2022
- Stock type: Diesel Multiple Unit
- In service: 19 December 2007 – present
- Manufacturers: Hyundai Rotem (Trainsets); Tokyu Car Corporation (Bogies)
- Family name: ICR
- Replaced: 201 Class; 071 Class; 121 Class; 141 Class; 181 Class; Mark 2 carriages; Mark 3 carriages; 29000 Class; 2800 Class
- Constructed: 2007–2011, 2019–2022
- Number built: 63 trainsets
- Formation: 3, 4, 5 and 6 car trainsets
- Fleet numbers: 22001–22063
- Capacity: 190 seated (3-car); 262 seated (4-car); 36 First / 340 Standard (6-car Premier Class); 398 seated / 18 tip up seats (6-car High Capacity)
- Operators: InterCity; Commuter
- Depots: Drogheda Depot; Laois Traincare Depot

Specifications
- Car body construction: Stainless steel
- Train length: 70 m (229 ft 8 in) (3-car set); 93 m (305 ft 1 in) (4-car set); 117 m (383 ft 10 in) (5-car set)
- Car length: End cars: 23.2 m (76 ft 1 in); Intermediate cars: 22.4 m (73 ft 6 in)
- Width: 2.84 m (9 ft 4 in)
- Height: 3.985 m (13 ft 0.9 in)
- Maximum speed: 161 km/h (100 mph)
- Weight: 63 tonne per car
- Prime movers: MTU 6H 1800 R83, 483bhp, one per car
- Transmission: Voith T 312 R
- Track gauge: 1,600 mm (5 ft 3 in) See Rail gauge in Ireland

The Irish Rail 22000 Class InterCity Railcar (ICR) is a diesel multiple unit in service with Iarnród Éireann in Ireland.

They are the first IÉ DMUs built specifically for InterCity routes, although they can also work on some commuter routes. They are designed to operate at a maximum speed of 100 mph (160 km/h).

== History ==
In 2005, the Irish Government announced the €34 billion Transport 21 proposal for significant improvements to transport infrastructure, with major emphasis on the railway network. As part of this, large-scale replacement of rolling stock was planned, then made up entirely of locomotive-hauled coaching stock, mostly British Rail Mark 2 and Mark 3. In 2005 IÉ ordered 120 new diesel multiple unit vehicles, to form 10 six-car and 20 three-car trains. This order was extended to 150 vehicles in 2005, to 183 vehicles in 2007 and to 234 vehicles in December 2008.

In 2018, it was announced that Iarnród Éireann were seeking to procure a further 41 new 22000 Class vehicles, with the ultimate aim of returning the fleet to a mix of three- and six-car sets. 41 additional centre cars were ordered in 2019 for delivery from 2021. The first of these were delivered in September 2022, with the final delivery in March 2023.

All units underwent an in-service interior overhaul between 2019 and 2022. This programme included replacing the original cloth seats with leather and adding USB power sockets at each seating bay, amongst other changes intended to reduce ongoing maintenance and cleaning costs.

== Deliveries ==
Supplied by Mitsui of Japan for approximately €400 million, the fleet was built by a partnership between Rotem of South Korea, who did the primary work, and Tokyu Car Corporation of Japan, who supplied the bogies. The first sets were delivered in March 2007, while the final sets were delivered in April 2012.

In March 2007, a €79 million order was placed for a further 33 vehicles to be used primarily on the outer Dublin commuter network. This was added to with an additional 51 commuter vehicles in December 2008. As of 2025, there are 63 sets in four different layouts: 21 three-car sets, 20 four-car sets, 10 premier class six-car sets and 12 high capacity six-car sets.

Two of the three-car sets, 22010 and 22011, were delivered in July 2007 with corrosion damage received in transit from South Korea. IÉ did not accept delivery and stored the sets until October 2008 when they were returned to Rotem for repair, with a revised delivery date of early 2009. It was later determined that it was uneconomic to repair them, so Rotem added two additional units to the last order at no additional cost to IÉ.

== Operations ==
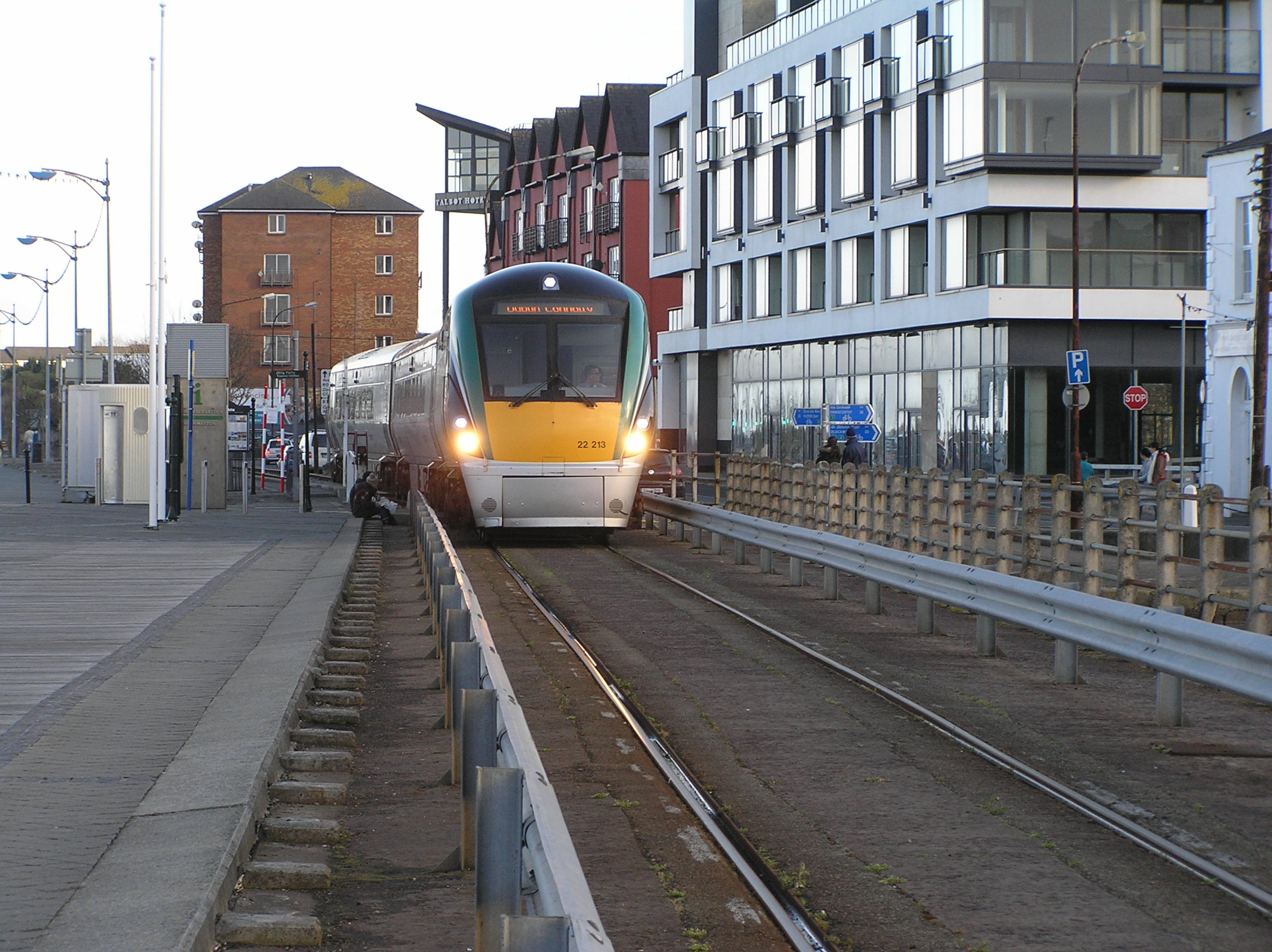
22013 in Wexford on a Rosslare Europort to Dublin Connolly service in 2012

The 22000 class was primarily ordered for InterCity routes except the Dublin-Belfast services operated by Enterprise and the Dublin-Cork service, for which IÉ purchased 67 locomotive-hauled coaches in 2006, but they have also been used on off-peak Dublin-Cork services since November 2009. 22000 units have now replaced coaching stock on services from Dublin to Galway, Westport, Limerick, Waterford and Tralee, and 2800 Class and 29000 Class DMUs to Sligo and Rosslare Europort.

The expansion of the Dublin commuter belt led IÉ to need dedicated long distance Commuter trains. 33 carriages were ordered for use on services to destinations such as Portlaoise, Carlow and Athlone.

Plans to improve Enterprise services included the potential of purchasing DMUs to replace its locomotive-hauled coaching stock. Among the options under consideration was the purchase of further 22000 Class units.

NI Railways was offered a variant of the 22000 Class to meet its "New Trains Two" requirement, before ultimately choosing a design similar to its existing Class 3000 unit, which became the Class 4000.

=== Unit types ===
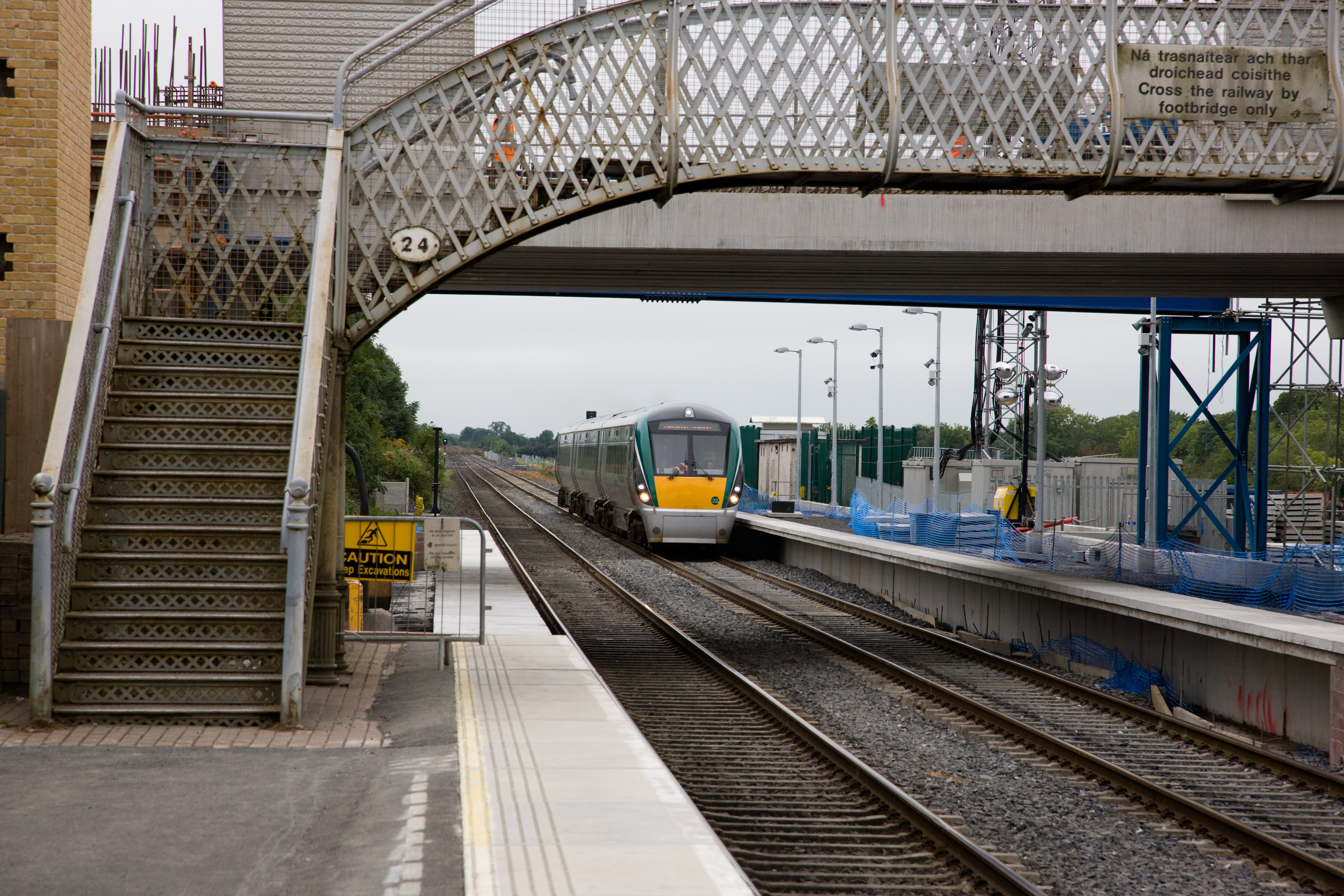
22022 passes through Hazelhatch and Celbridge railway station on a Cork to Dublin service in 2008

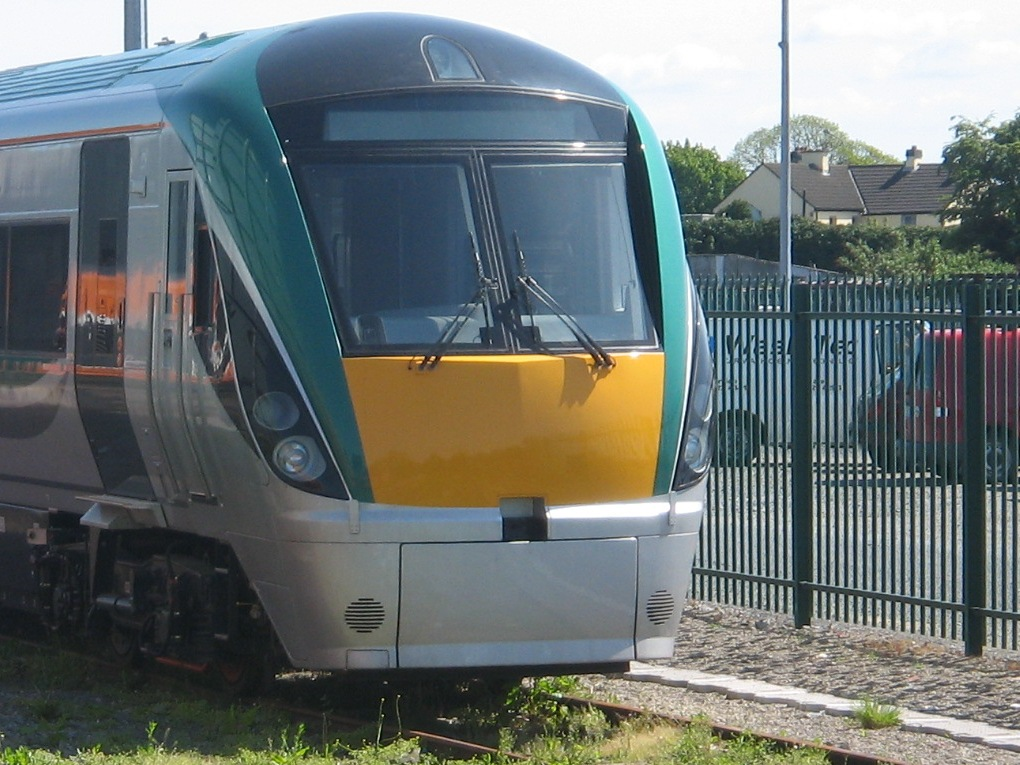
A 22000 at Limerick station in 2008

As delivered, the first 30 units were of three cars, for use on InterCity routes, as were ten of the 15 six-car units. The remaining five six-car sets and the 17 three-car sets ordered in 2008 were configured for long-distance Commuter services from Dublin. Combinations of two 3-car sets, three 3-car sets, two 4-car sets, a 3-car set and a 4-car set, and two 5-car sets are possible.

- A1 22131–35, 40: Driving car, catering, wheelchair accessible WC, one wheelchair space, 36 1st class seats
- A11 22136–39 :A1 car with NIR signal & radio system
- A2 22207–30,41–63: Driving car, standard WC, 66 seats
- A22 22201–06: A2 car with NIR TPWS/AWS & radio system
- A3 22307–63: Driving car, wheelchair accessible WC, two wheelchair spaces, bicycle storage, 54 seats
- A33 22301–06: A3 car with NIR signal & radio system & parcels/bike space
- B 22401–63, 631–45, 731–45: Intermediate car, standard WC, 72 seats
- B1 22531–45: B car with sanding system
- B2 22511–27, 441–52, 641–52: Intermediate car with multipurpose space

In 2013, IÉ announced plans to reform the 22000 class units from 3 and 6-car sets into 3 and 4-car units, to obtain better flexibility from them in regards to passenger numbers per train. However, it soon became apparent that replacing 6-car units with 4-car ones would lead to overcrowding, which caused IÉ to subsequently alter the proposal into sets of 3, 4 and 5-car lengths. The 20 cars taken off the original 6-car sets 22031–45 and inserted in the original 3-car sets 22011–30 got additional numbers 22811–30 but also kept the original number 22531–540, 641, 741, 642, 742, 643, 743, 644, 744, 645, 745.

=== Fuel economy ===
There have been attempts to improve the fuel economy of the 22000 Class. In 2008 the class were modified to shut down the engines after a period of inactivity if the drivers cab key was off, and in 2018 it was announced that a three-car unit was to trial a ZF transmission to replace the original Voith and it was hoped this might yield 19% fuel savings in some conditions.

An additional nine cars are to be fitted with a diesel-battery hybrid MTU/Rolls-Royce power pack as a trial, with route-dependent fuel savings of up to 33%

== Fleet details ==
Class	Number	Year built	Built as	Since 2014	Since 2024	Unit numbers	Routes operated	Notes	
22000	9	2007–2009, 2011	3-car	3-car	3-car	22001–22006	InterCity & Commuter	Fitted with TPWS and AWS for use on NIR. 22001 fitted with in-cab signalling.	
22000	9	2007–2009, 2011	3-car	3-car	3-car	22007–22009	InterCity & Commuter		
22000	11	2011	3-car	3-car	3-car	22053–22063	InterCity & Commuter		
22000	18	2007–2022	3-car	4-car	4-car	22010–22027	InterCity & Commuter	22010 & 22011 returned to manufacturer and replaced with identically numbered units, 22010–22027 fitted with B2 car in 2024	
22000	3	2007–2009	3-car	4-car	4-car	22028–22030	InterCity & Commuter		
22000 (HC)	12	2007–2022	6-car	4-car	6-car	22041–22052	InterCity & Commuter	High Capacity 22041–22052 fitted with two B2 cars in 2024	
22000 (P)	10	2008	6-car	5-car	6-car	22031–22035	InterCity, Enterprise	Premier Class	
22000 (P)	10	2008	6-car	5-car	6-car	22034, 22036–22040	InterCity, Enterprise	Premier Class	Fitted with TPWS and AWS for use on NIR

== Features ==
- Engine: MTU 6H 1800 R83, 12.8 L, 6 cylinder, 483 bhp gross, 386 bhp (288 kW) traction per car.
- Transmission: Voith T 312 R
- Top speed: 160 km/h (100 mph)
- Body: high quality stainless steel with some corrosion-resistant carbon steel components
- Automatic PA and information display systems (Supplier: SA Viewcom)
- Fully air-conditioned (Supplier: Toshiba)
- Saloon, external view of doors and front-facing CCTV camera and recording system (Supplier: Verint)
- Catering facilities (some trains have buffet bars)
- Individual base seating
- Fire safety to BS 6853 Cat 1B, automatic fire extinguishing system for engines & fuel tanks
- All sets have Irish standard CAWS signaling systems and train radio.
- 3-car sets 22001–22006, as well as 6-car sets 22036–22040 have TPWS/AWS for operation on Northern Ireland Railways.

== Models ==
Irish Railway Models announced an 00 gauge model of the 22000 Class in October 2022.

== Accidents and incidents ==
In January 2012, Set 22033 was damaged in Athenry during an incident. It was hauled back to Laois Train Care Depot by IE 071 Class Loco 076.

On 17 July 2018, unit 22016 was involved in an incident at Laois Train Care Depot when the set collided with the buffers. The set sustained minor damage.

On 29 June 2024, the 21.28 from Belfast Lanyon Place to Dublin Connolly operated by IE 22000 Class DMU 22037 was damaged outside Drogheda due to a deer strike. The set eventually made it to Dublin and was reinstated in service the following morning.

On 10 February 2025, unit 22039 collided with a Timber Train in Westport. One of the DM cars (22139) was badly damaged.

On 7 May 2025, unit 22036 was involved in a deer strike near Dundalk while working the 05.50 Dublin to Belfast train. The set was terminated at Dundalk and returned empty to Dublin and picked up the diagram the next day.

On 8 April 2026, unit 22351 caught fire while working the 12.45pm service from Dublin to Westport, forcing passengers to detrain 15 kilometres from Roscommon town. No passengers or Irish Rail staff were injured.

On 3 September 2026 at approximately 15:50 hours, 22026 was involved in a collision with a tractor at level crossing XA008 between Portarlington and Tullamore while operating the A806 service from Dublin Heuston to Westport. 22000 class set 26 was then brought to Tullamore where passengers disembared unharmed.

On 3 September 2026 at approximately 20:45 hours, 22019 was involved in a serious collision with a road vehicle at level crossing XM160 (Kiltybo) near Ballyhaunis while operating the A808 service from Dublin Heuston to Westport, resulting in a overnight and morning line closure. Tragically this incident resulted in the death of a child. No rail passengers were injured.

== See also ==
- Multiple units of Ireland
- KTM Class 91
- HRCS2
