= Drumcondra railway station =

Railway station in Dublin, Ireland

Drumcondra Droim Chonrach
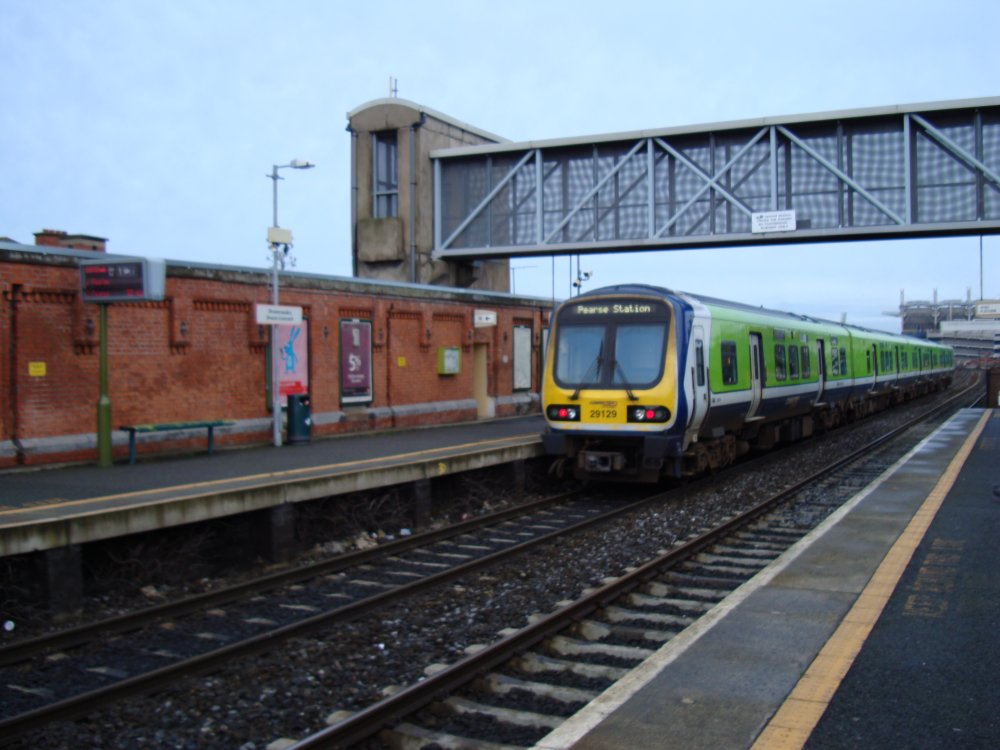
- Commuter 29000 Class at Drumcondra Station

General information
- Location: 30 Drumcondra Road Lower, Dublin; D09 H0V5; Ireland
- Coordinates: 53.3631°N 6.2585°W
- Owner: Iarnród Éireann
- Operator: Iarnród Éireann
- Platforms: 2
- Tracks: 2
- Bus operators: Aircoach; Bus Éireann; Collins Coaches; Dublin Bus; John McGinley; Matthews; Wexford Bus
- Connections: 1; 16; 19; 33; 33E; 33N; 41; 41B; 41C; 41D; 44; 101; 700; 700X; 740; 740A; 740X; 900; 901; 901M; 910; 932; 980B

Construction
- Structure type: Elevated
- Parking: no
- Accessible: yes

Other information
- Station code: DCDRA
- Fare zone: Suburban 1

History
- Opened: 1901
- Closed: 1910
- Rebuilt: 1998
- Pre-grouping: MGWR

Key dates
- 1 April 1901: Station opens
- 1 December 1910: Station closed
- 2 March 1998: Station reopened
- Iarnród Éireann; CIÉ; IÉ railway stations
Route map
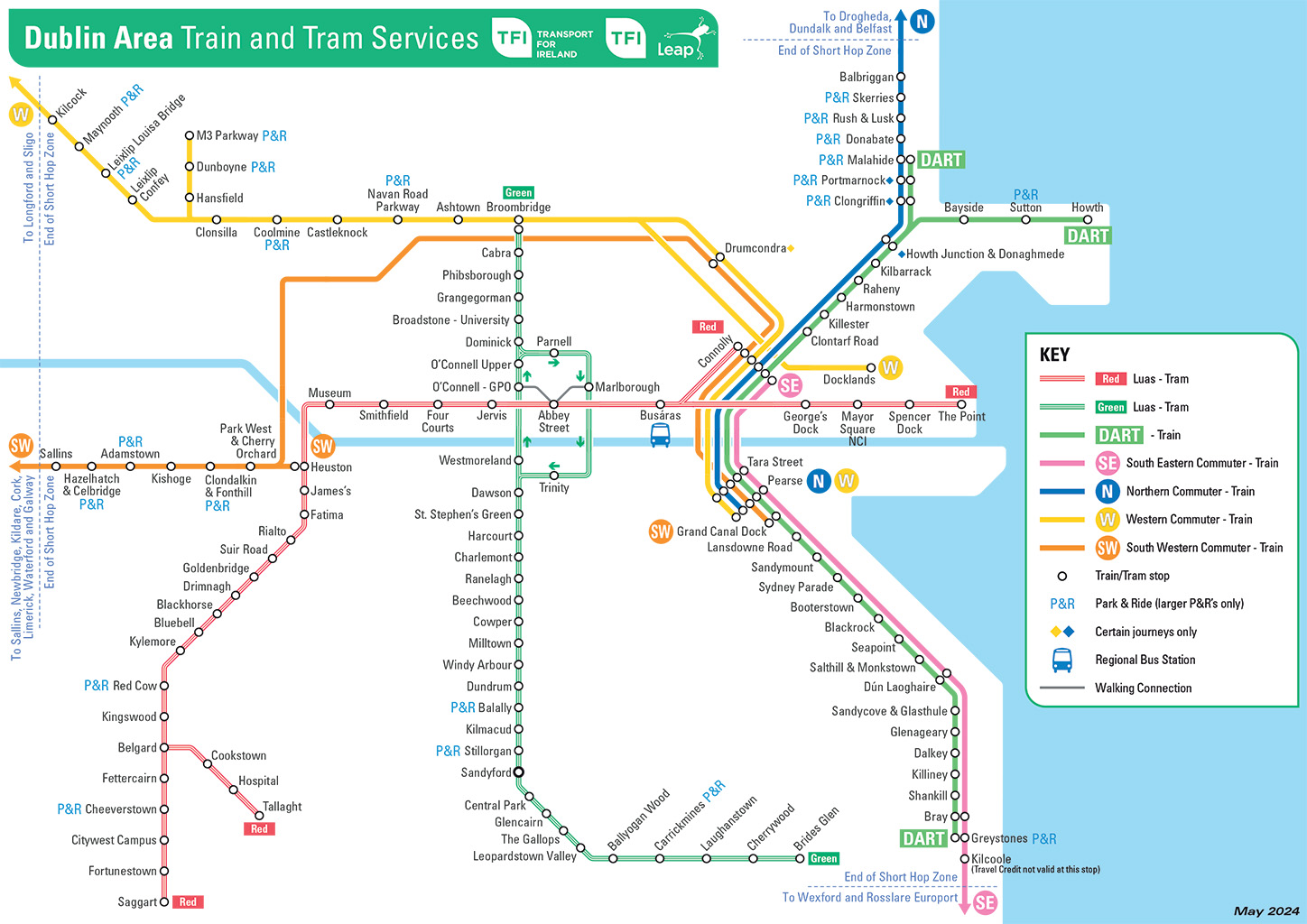
(Click to expand)
Location

Drumcondra is a railway station on the Dublin Connolly to Longford and Grand Canal Dock to Newbridge commuter services. Almost all Sligo and Longford to Dublin services stop at Drumcondra.

It serves Drumcondra, Dublin, Ireland and is the nearest railway station for Croke Park and Tolka Park sports venues. It is elevated with just the entrance on the main Drumcondra road.

The ticket office is open from 07:00 AM to 23:30 PM, Monday to Sunday.

== History ==
The station initially opened on 1 April 1901, but closed on 1 December 1910, with the termination of Kingsbridge (now Heuston Station) to Amiens Street (now Connolly Station) services. Part of the original building was demolished in late 1918.

It reopened on 2 March 1998 as a station on the Maynooth/Longford commuter line.

== Services ==
=== Train Services ===
Drumcondra Station has a range of services. These include Connolly-Sligo Intercity trains, Connolly-Longford and Maynooth commuter trains and Grand Canal Dock-Newbridge/Hazelhatch commuter services routes. The Sligo Intercity trains operate on a bi-hourly schedule on weekdays, providing connectivity to all stations en route to Sligo, excluding Leixlip Louisa Bridge. Connolly-Longford trains run approximately every 2–3 hours, while Maynooth services operate every 20–30 minutes. Grand Canal Dock-Newbridge/Hazelhatch trains maintain a 20–30-minute interval during peak hours.

On Saturdays, the Sligo Intercity trains run every 2–3 hours. Commuter services to Longford & Grand Canal Dock-Newbridge/Hazelhatch cease while the Maynooth service decrease to an interval of 30-40mins, and Grand Canal Dock also operate at reduced frequencies but remain active throughout the day. On Sundays, the Sligo Intercity trains continue their 3–4-hour schedule, with Maynooth services running every hour.

Preceding station	Iarnród Éireann	Following station
Dublin Connolly	InterCity; Dublin-Sligo	Broombridge
Dublin Connolly	Commuter; Western Commuter (City Branch)	Broombridge
Dublin Connolly	Commuter; South Western Commuter (City Branch)	Park West and Cherry Orchard
	Proposed	
Dublin Connolly	Commuter; South Western Commuter (City Branch)	Glasnevin
Dublin Connolly	DART; Line 1	Glasnevin

=== Bus Services ===
Many bus services operate from the street outside the station, with a mix of local and regional operators with routes to destinations such as Dublin City Centre, Dublin Airport, DCU, Trinity College Dublin, Dundalk (Marshes Shopping Centre), Swords, Carrickmacross, Gorey, and Drogheda.

== Proposals ==
Drumcondra was considered as a potential interchange stop on the proposed Metro North line of the Dublin Metro. However, following publication of revised plans for MetroLink in 2018, it was proposed that it would link up with a new station at Glasnevin, west of Drumcondra.

== See also ==
- List of railway stations in Ireland
- Rail transport in Ireland
- St. Anne's Road Pocket Park
