= Hazelhatch and Celbridge railway station =

Railway station in County Dublin, Ireland

Hazelhatch and Celbridge Collchoill agus Cill Droichid
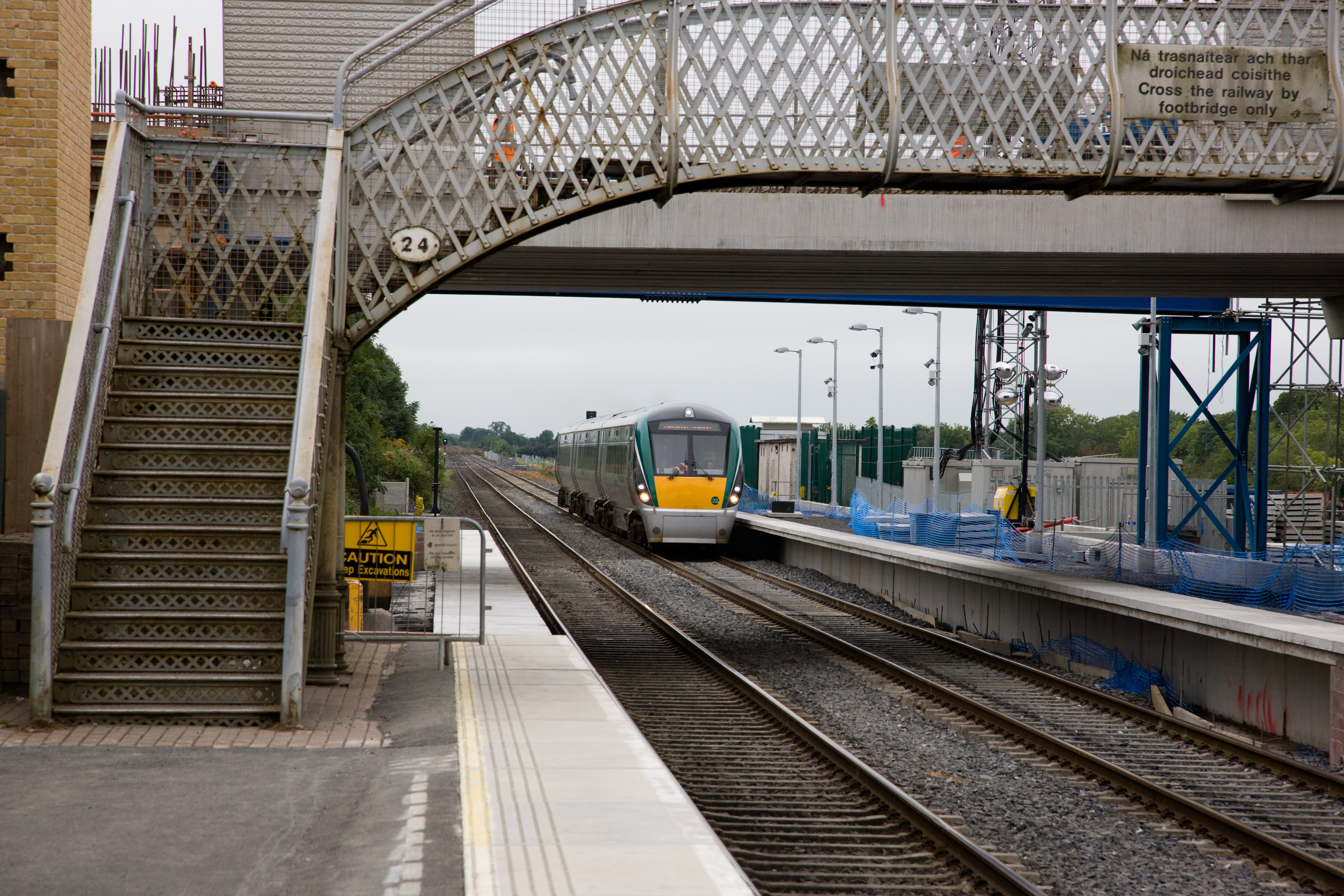
- A 22000 ICR Class (22222) passes through the station

General information
- Location: Hazelhatch, Celbridge, County Kildare/South Dublin, W23 YY65; Ireland
- Coordinates: 53.3223°N 6.5238°W
- Owner: Iarnród Éireann
- Operator: Iarnród Éireann
- Platforms: 5
- Tracks: 4
- Bus operators: Dublin Bus; Go-Ahead Ireland
- Connections: L58; L59; W6

Construction
- Structure type: At-grade

Other information
- Station code: HZLCH
- Fare zone: 1

History
- Opened: 1846
- Original company: Great Southern and Western Railway
- Pre-grouping: Great Southern and Western Railway
- Post-grouping: Great Southern Railways

Key dates
- 2009: Number of platforms increased to five
Route map
Location

Hazelhatch and Celbridge railway station serves the area around Hazelhatch in South Dublin and the large town of Celbridge in neighbouring County Kildare, Ireland. Because of its distance from Celbridge town (2.4 km / 1½ miles south of the town centre) there are various bus routes that link the station to there and also to other surrounding towns. The county boundary between Dublin and Kildare runs directly through the station.

== History ==
The station opened on 4 August 1846 and closed for goods traffic on 9 June 1947.

The station received an upgrade in the late 2000s which added a new station building, car park, three new platforms and lifts. The original waiting rooms were retained.

The station won an award, sponsored by London Underground, at the 2009 National Railway Heritage Awards in London, UK, for the successful adaptation of a heritage structure to include accessibility.

== Description ==
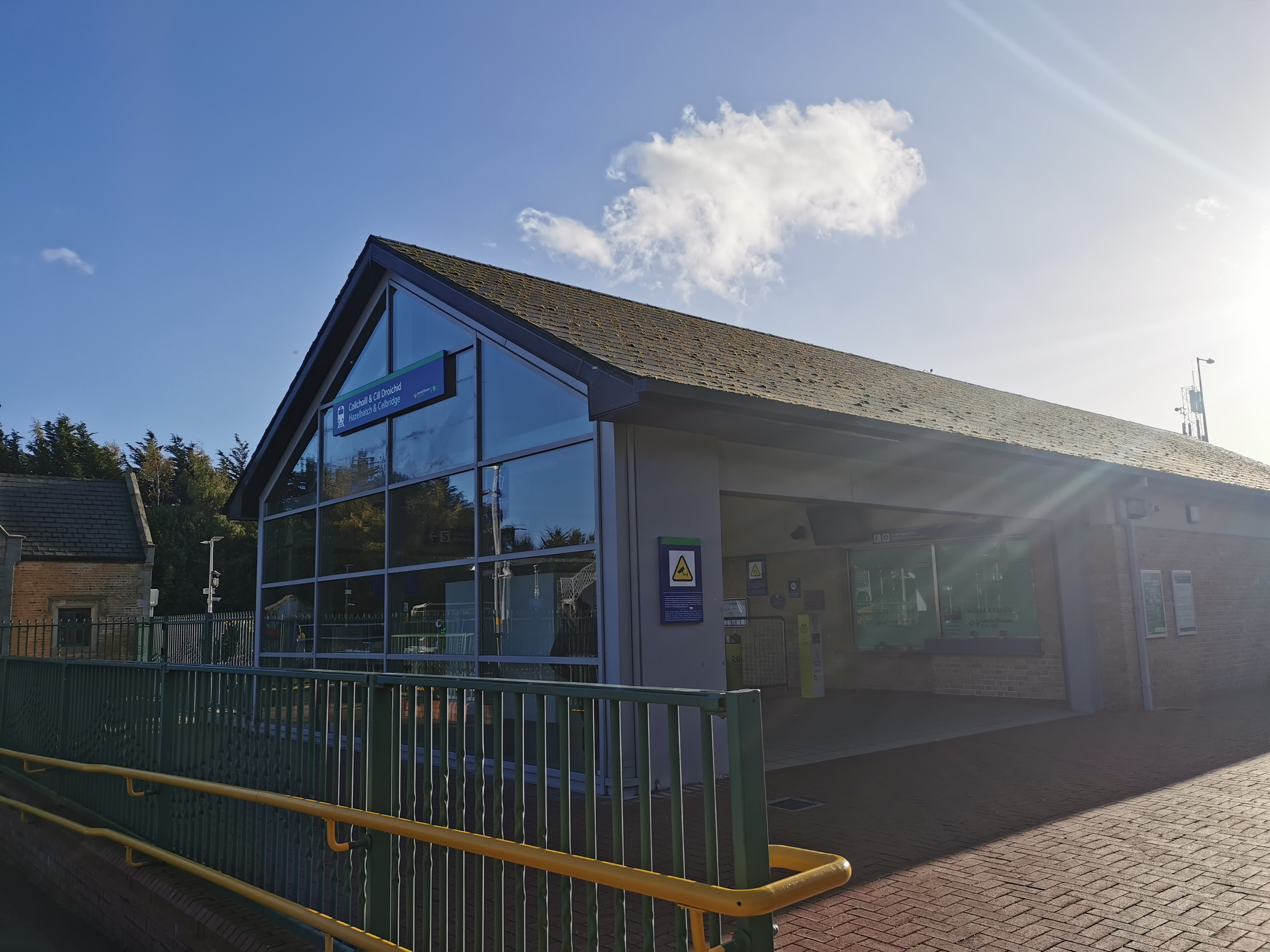
The station's small building

The station has four through platforms and one terminal platform like in Adamstown. Unlike Adamstown, the terminal platform is used. Platforms 1 and 5 are fast line platforms and are not served by regular scheduled trains and are passed through by express services. However, they do get used in exclusive circumstances, such as points failures. Platforms 2 and 4 are slow line platforms and are traditionally used by South Western Commuter and Galway (at peak times) and Waterford Plunkett InterCity services to and from Dublin Heuston in Dublin city centre. Platform 3 is a terminal platform which is served by terminating services from Grand Canal Dock via the Phoenix Park Tunnel.

== Services ==
Preceding station	Iarnród Éireann	Following station
Dublin Heuston	InterCity; Dublin–Westport/Galway railway line Peak times only	Sallins & Naas
Dublin Heuston	InterCity; Dublin–Waterford railway line	Sallins & Naas
Adamstown	Commuter; South Western Commuter	Sallins & Naas or Terminus

== See also ==
- List of railway stations in Ireland
