= Clondalkin/Fonthill railway station =

Railway station in Ireland

Clondalkin / Fonthill Cluain Dolcáin / Cnoc an Fhuaráin
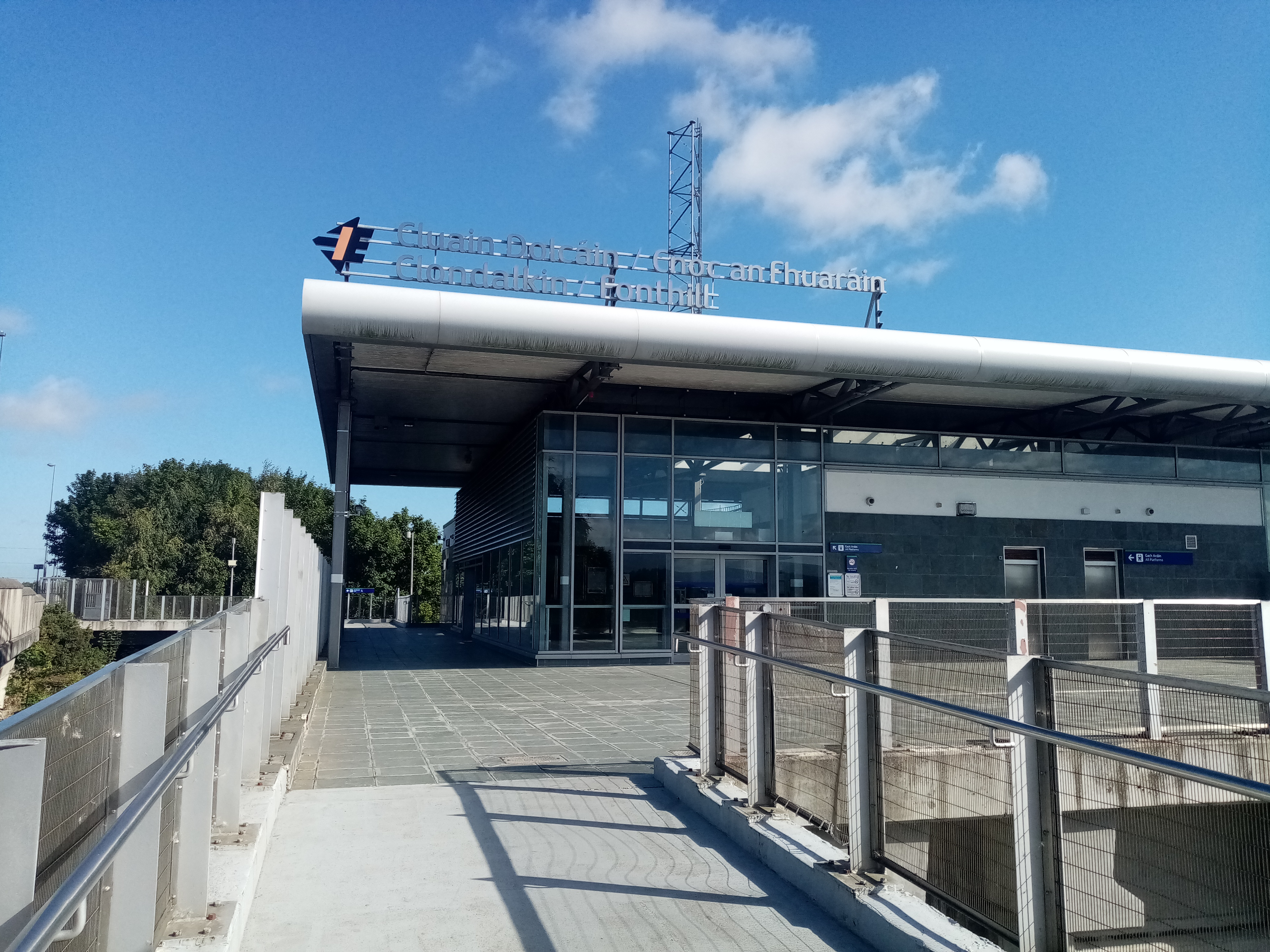
- The station's exterior, on Fonthill Road.

General information
- Location: Fonthill Road North, Clondalkin, Dublin; Ireland
- Coordinates: 53.3334°N 6.4062°W
- Owner: Iarnród Éireann
- Operator: Iarnród Éireann
- Line: Portlaoise Commuter/ South Western Commuter
- Platforms: 4
- Tracks: 4
- Bus operators: Dublin Bus
- Connections: L54

Construction
- Structure type: At-grade

Other information
- Station code: CLDKN
- Fare zone: 1

History
- Opened: 13 October 2008; 17 years ago
Location

Clondalkin / Fonthill railway station (also known as Fonthill Road on Irish Rail Information screens and Clondalkin and Fonthill on onboard train announcements) is an Iarnród Éireann railway station in Dublin, Ireland that serves the Clondalkin and Fonthill areas.

It opened on 13 October 2008, and is located on the R113 road (in particular, the section known as the Fonthill Road), west of Clondalkin, between Ronanstown and the Nangor Road.

It is served by South Western Commuter services.

The station has four through platforms, although not all are currently in service pending completion of the Kildare Route Project, a major project to upgrade the South Western Commuter line.

Under Transport 21 plans, Clondalkin/Fonthill would interchange with a station of the planned Dublin Metro's Metro West line called Fonthill.

== History ==
The current station replaced the former Clondalkin railway station, located less than 1 km east of the new station on the South Western Commuter line, at Cloverhill Industrial Estate. The station opened on 4 August 1846 and was closed to passengers on 20 January 1947 and for goods traffic on 9 June 1947. It re-opened for passengers when the South Western Commuter service (originally known as Arrow) began on 16 May 1994.

The station again closed after the final train on 12 October 2008 and was replaced with the current station.

== Services ==
Preceding station	Iarnród Éireann	Following station
Park West & Cherry Orchard	Commuter; South Western Commuter	Kishoge

== See also ==
- List of railway stations in Ireland
