= Glasnevin railway station =

Former railway station in Dublin, Ireland

Coordinates: 53.3649°N 6.2710°W

Glasnevin railway station was a Great Southern and Western Railway (GS&WR) station serving Glasnevin in Dublin, Ireland. Together with nearby Drumcondra railway station, the station operated from 1901 to 1910 on the Drumcondra and North Dublin Link Railway line between Amiens Street (now Connolly) station and Islandbridge. While Drumcondra station re-opened in 1998, Glasnevin's platform was demolished in 1916. Some of the station's red-bricked outbuildings are incorporated into the former Porterhouse North pub on Whitworth Road.

As of 2019, it was proposed to open a new station at Glasnevin, close to (but not on) the site of the former GS&WR station. These proposals called for a station to be built between the Western Commuter and South Western Commuter lines, on the site of the Brian Boru pub, as part of the MetroLink project. The related planning application, submitted in September 2022, included the proposed demolition of the pub.
