= Park West and Cherry Orchard railway station =

Railway station in County Dublin, Ireland

Park West & Cherry Orchard Páirc an Iarthiar & Gort na Silíní
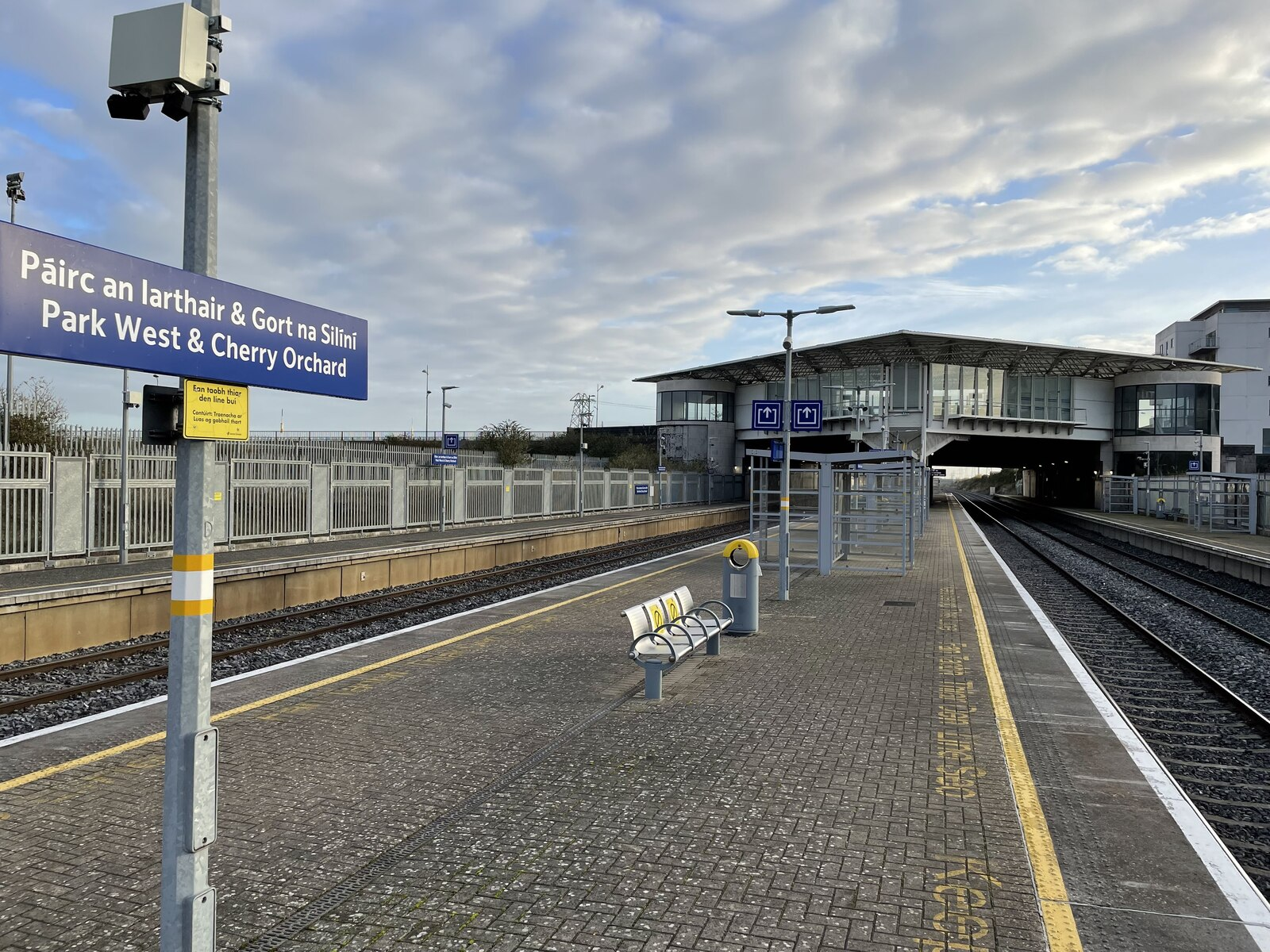
- A view of Park West and Cherry Orchard station looking east.

General information
- Location: Park West Avenue, Dublin, D12 PX44; Ireland
- Coordinates: 53.335°N 6.365°W
- Owner: Iarnród Éireann
- Operator: Iarnród Éireann
- Platforms: 4
- Tracks: 4
- Bus operators: Dublin Bus; Express Bus
- Connections: G1; 860

Construction
- Structure type: At-grade
- Accessible: Yes

Other information
- Station code: CHORC
- Fare zone: Suburban 1

History
- Opened: 28 July 2008; 18 years ago
Location

Park West and Cherry Orchard railway station (also known as Park West on automated Irish Rail station announcements) is an Iarnród Éireann railway station in Ballyfermot, Dublin, Ireland, serving the Park West and the Cherry Orchard area.

== Description ==
The station opened on 28 July 2008, replacing the former Cherry Orchard and Parkwest Station located nearby. It is located in on the Dublin - Cork main line (the pre-Grouping Great Southern & Western Railway) and is served by South Western Commuter services.

== Former Cherry Orchard station ==
The former station, Cherry Orchard and Parkwest - originally simply called Cherry Orchard - opened on 16 May 1994. It was closed on 27 July 2008 as part of the Kildare Route Project, and demolished later in 2008.

== Services ==
=== Train Services ===
Preceding station	Iarnród Éireann	Following station
Dublin Heuston	Commuter; South Western Commuter	Clondalkin/Fonthill
Drumcondra	Commuter; South Western Commuter	Clondalkin/Fonthill

=== Bus Services ===
Bus operators that serve the station include Dublin Bus, Express Bus and Fair Isle Tours

== Passenger numbers ==
Years	Daily Passenger Boardings and Alightings	Change
2012	266	-
2013	269	▲3
2014	355	▲86
2015	467	▲112
2016	462	▼5
2017	881	▲419
2018	1066	▲185

The station benefited from increased passenger numbers with the opening of the Phoenix Park Tunnel for commuter services in November 2016 allowing direct services to Drumcondra, Connolly Station and Grand Canal Dock bypassing Heuston Station.

== See also ==
- List of railway stations in Ireland
