= Adamstown, Dublin =

Suburban development in County Dublin, Ireland

Adamstown Baile Adaim (Irish)
- Planned town
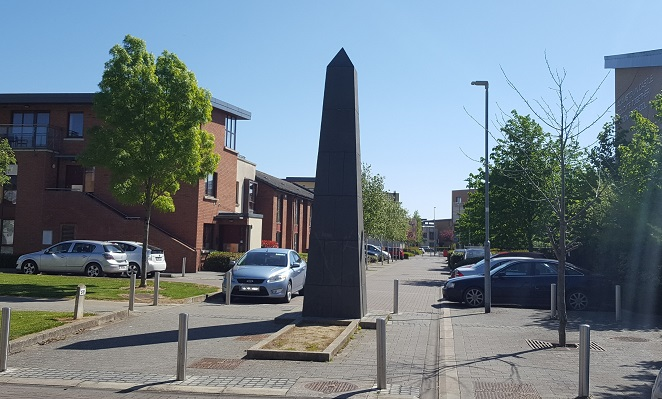
- Housing and obelisk (installed in 2009) at Adamstown

- Location in Ireland
- Coordinates: 53°19′50″N 6°27′33″W
- Country: Ireland
- Province: Leinster
- County: County Dublin
- Local government area: South Dublin County Council

Government
  - Dáil constituency: Dublin Mid-West
  - EP constituency: Dublin constituency
- Elevation: 54 m (177 ft)
- Time zone: UTC+0 (WET)
  - Summer (DST): UTC-1 (IST (WEST))

Adamstown (Irish: Baile Adaim) is a planned town and suburban development in County Dublin, Ireland. Located approximately 16 km from Dublin city centre, it is in the jurisdiction of South Dublin County Council. The first planned town to be developed in Ireland since Shannon Town in the 1980s, the development-in-progress is based on a 220 hectare site which is a designated Strategic Development Zone. This site lies south of the N4 road and Lucan, west of a River Liffey tributary, the Griffeen River, and north of the Grand Canal.

While no date has been set for the official granting of any long-term official status (as of 2022 the local authority described it as an "emerging new town"), development has been underway since 2005. As of 2015, perhaps 4,500 of a planned population of 25,000 were resident and by 2022 had reached approximately 10,000. As of 2020, the planned scale of development was approximately 9,000 dwellings, with supporting infrastructure including public transport links.

== Geography ==
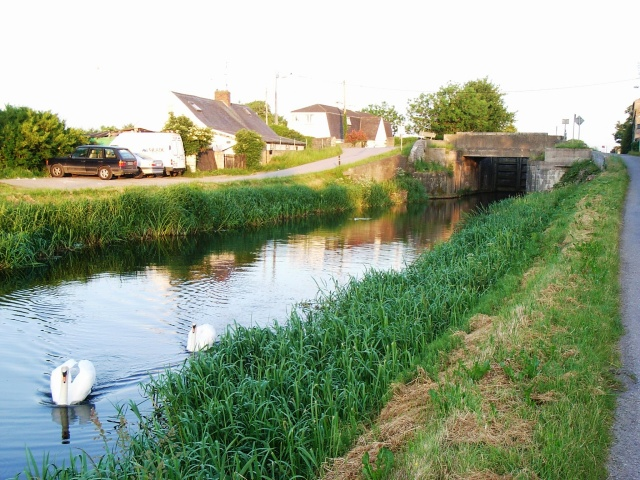
The Grand Canal passes through the area

Adamstown is located in west County Dublin, south of Lucan and north of Baldonnell. It is the beside the Dublin–Kildare railway line. The settlement is south of the N4 national primary route road. Weston Airport is nearby.

== History ==
=== Concept and commencement ===
Adamstown originated with the 1998 South Dublin County Development Plan, which considered the creation of several "new towns" – only Adamstown made it to the development stage, and the area was legally designated as a Strategic Development Zone. The advance or parallel provision of a new railway station was an integral part of its development plan, together with the provision of new schools, shopping, entertainment and sporting facilities, all within walking distance in the neighbourhood, and aligned to the building of housing. The homes built in Adamstown were to be familiar types of houses and apartment blocks but with a layout dissimilar to other later 20th-century developments in Ireland in that they were to incorporate modern urban design concepts. The development was designed to reduce car usage, with the ease of access to the train station intended to promote walking and cycling. There was a limit on high-rise buildings, with three to four storeys being the planned norm for most areas in the development zone.

The foundation stone was laid by Taoiseach Bertie Ahern in February 2003 and infrastructure works officially commenced on 7 February 2005. On 16 February 2006, the first houses went on the market, and the developer-funded railway station opened on 10 April 2007.

=== Development, delays and resumption ===
It was intended that after an initial ten years of development, it would have around 10,000 homes, and about 25,000 people, with schools, a library, community and healthcare centres, a cinema and a range of retail facilities. Development slowed after the initial phases – which saw around 1,270 homes completed – partly due to the aftermath of the 2008 financial crisis, and parts of the proposed settlement remained boarded off for years. Only 20 homes were completed from 2010 to 2014, leaving a total of less than 1,400 from the target 10,000 after 10 years. The local authority applied to alter aspects of the area's development plan, and while some requests were rejected by An Bord Pleanála – the planning board – target densities were reduced, as developers lobbied that apartments were not viable for sale, and some features, notably the swimming pool, were allowed to be decoupled from the phased construction of housing. Additionally, some infrastructure which had been supposed to be funded by developers was to be provided with State funding instead.

In 2015, Ulster Bank moved to sell 90% of the largely undeveloped zoned lands (with space for around 7,000 dwellings). By then facilities comprised three schools, two shops and a hairdressing salon, along with multiple playing pitches and a park. Development was planned and delivered with an emphasis on family safety, with enclosed green spaces overlooked by housing and wide cycle paths; mature trees were also planted. At this time the population consisted of about 3,500 people in a housing development on one side of the railway line and 1,000 in another development on the other, about 90% being private purchases, and 10% social housing clients. A third housing development went on sale in October 2016, selling out by 2017. Further development launched in 2017.

As of mid-2020, 2,613 homes had been built, and subject to delays due to the COVID-19 pandemic, development of thousands more were expected to proceed, with 3,500 new dwellings already covered by some form of county council permission. The train station and three schools, a modest range of retail facilities, a community centre, and an all-weather sports pitch were operating as of the same time.

As of late 2024, approximately 4,800 homes had been built out of the 7,500 with planning applications completed.

== Transport ==
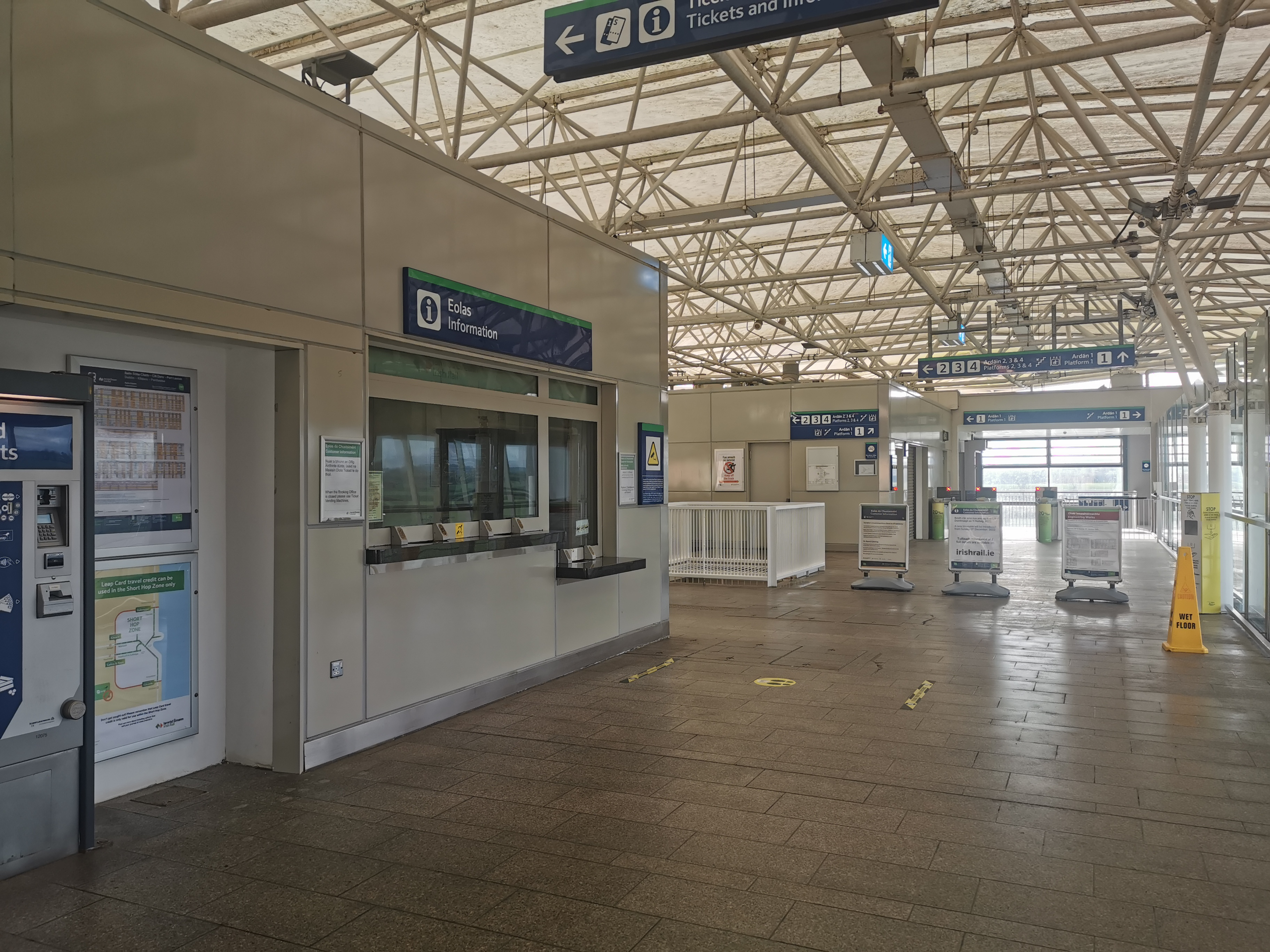
Adamstown railway station interior

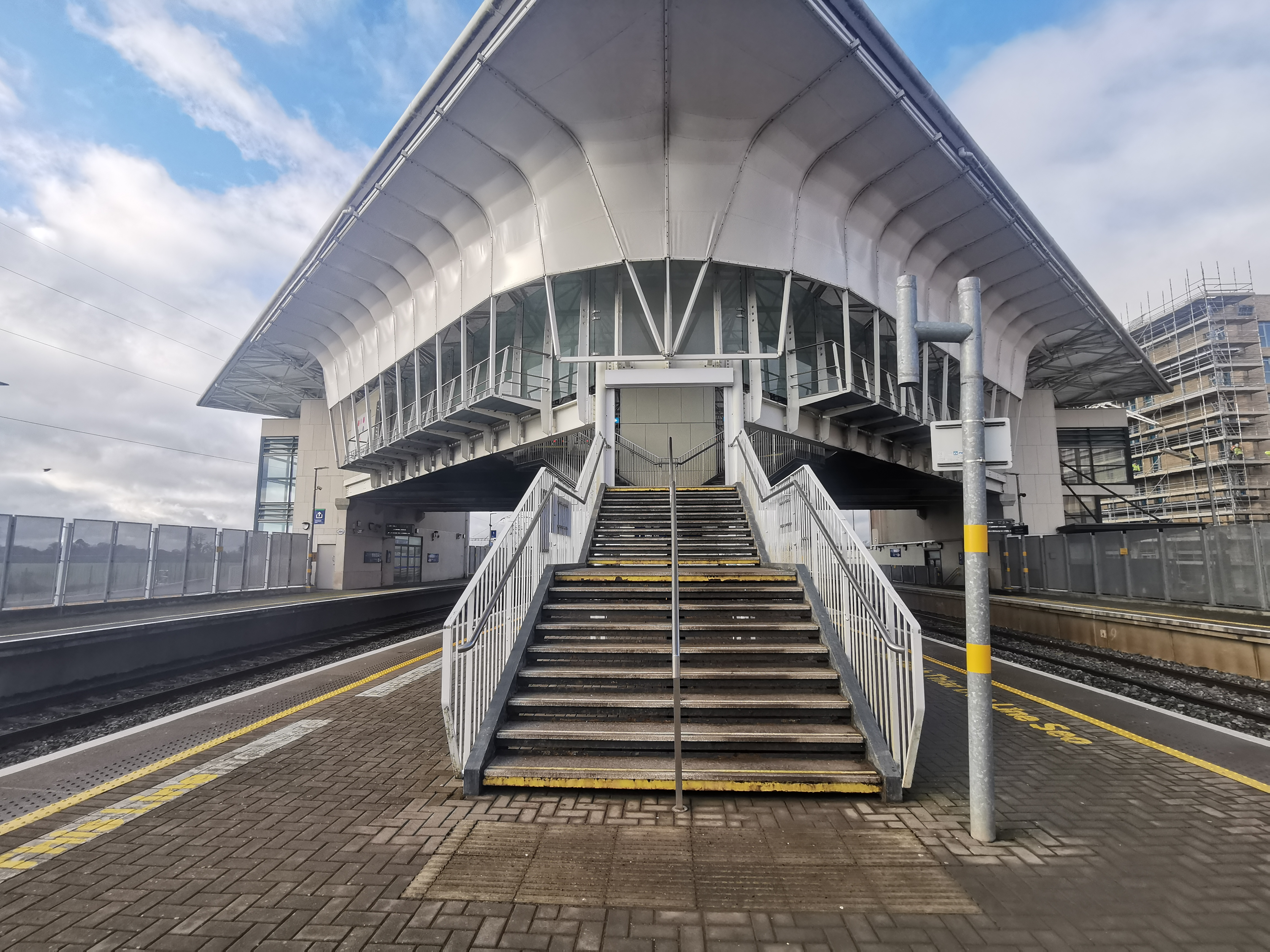
Adamstown station platforms

Adamstown lies on the Dublin–Kildare railway line, and has a new, privately funded station, Adamstown railway station. Trains run on the southside services to Dublin Heuston/Grand Canal Dock and northside services to Newbridge/ Portlaoise.

Adamstown is also served by the C-Spine bus routes operated by Dublin Bus and Go-Ahead Ireland. C-Spine routes (C1, C2) to Sandymount via City centre commence in Adamstown Station and have a 30-minute frequency. C1 and C2 busses are operational 24 hours with reduced night-time frequency. Two peak only routes (P29 to Ringsend Road, X30 to UCD) and three local routes (L51 and L53 to Liffey Valley, L52 to Blanchardstown) are operational.

== Amenities ==
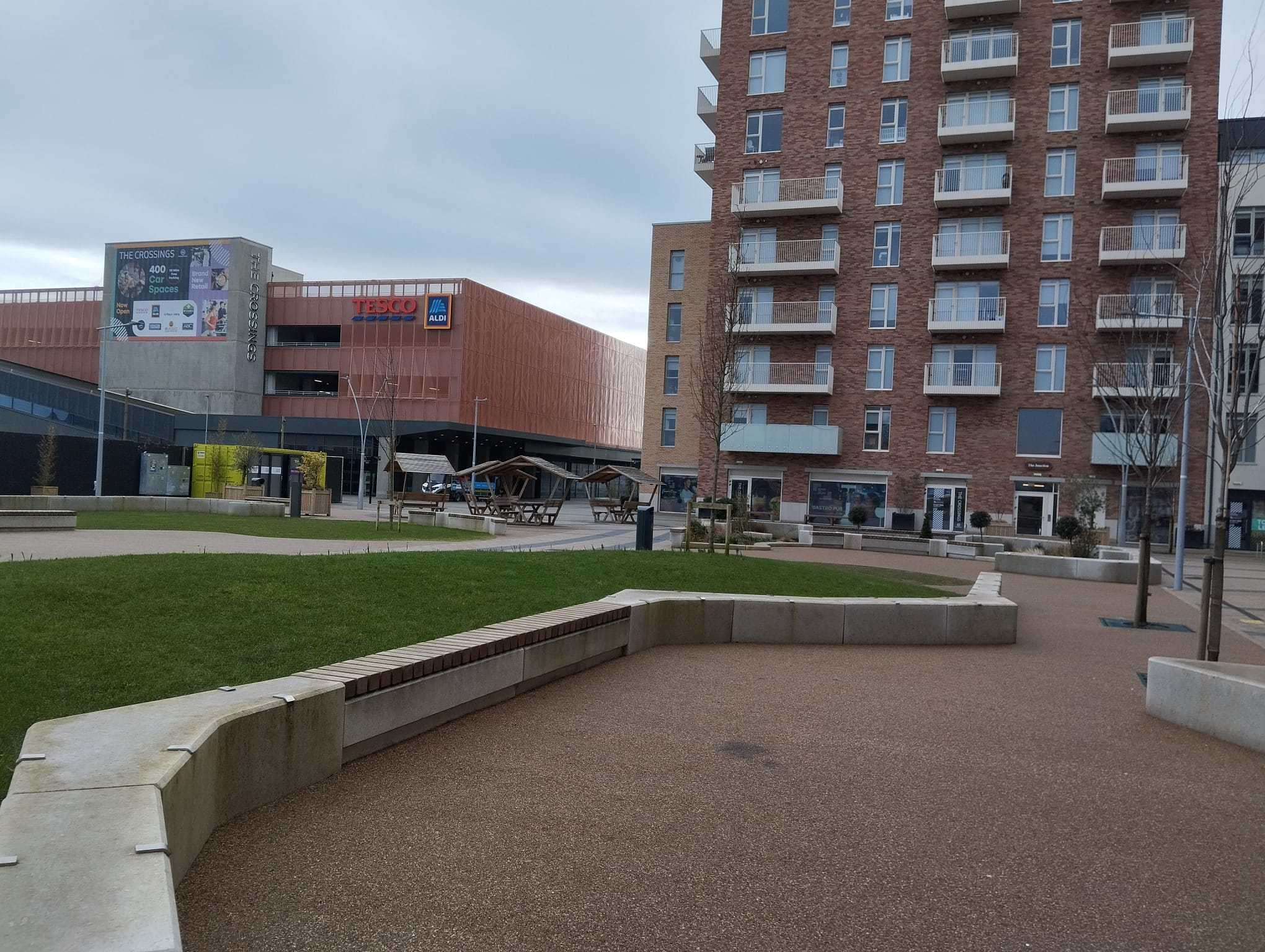
The Crossings

Adamstown's first neighbourhood shopping centre included a small Londis supermarket, a hair and beauty salon, and a cafe/pizzeria, situated in the Sentinel Building. In April 2023, Tesco and Aldi supermarkets opened beside the train station, as part of The Crossings shopping centre. As of late 2024, a veterinarian office, café and a pharmacy had opened. In addition, as of early 2025, a supermaket, butcher shop and hardware shop were in the process of being added to The Crossings.

There is also a Supervalu shopping centre on Newcastle Road, while Lucan village is nearby.

=== Parks ===
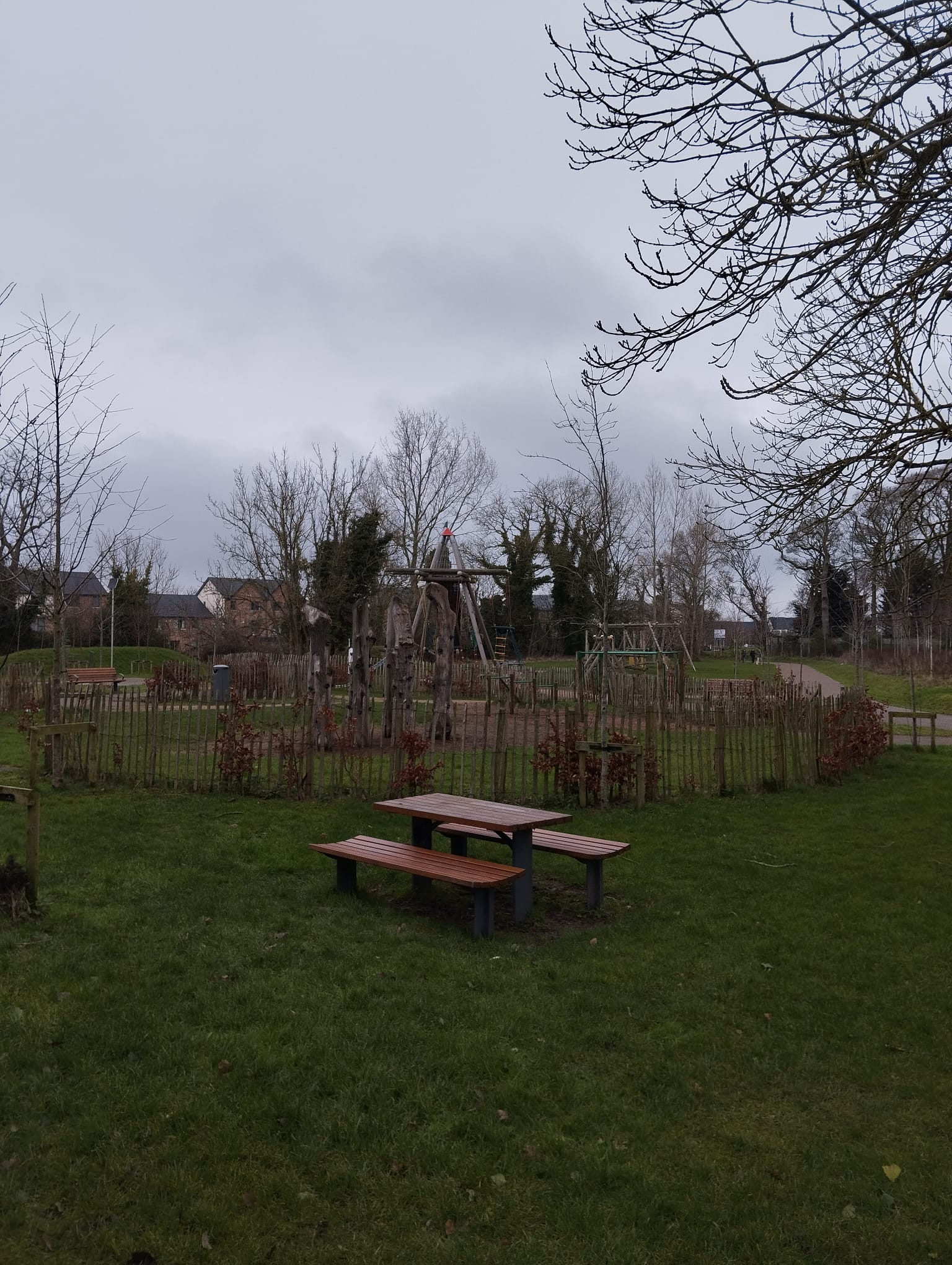
Tandy's Lane Park

Tandy's Lane Park has children's play areas, 1.5 km walking/jogging paths, sports & playing pitch, parkour area, an exercise area and car park.

Airlie Park is a 10.95-hectare public park with sports facilities (All-Weather GAA pitch, cricket oval, tennis and basketball courts), pavilion with changing facilities and a café.

The area features a River Liffey tributary stream, the Tobermaclugg, which is planned to be featured in a new public park.

=== Education ===
As of 2016, there was a crèche and two primary schools, Adamstown Educate Together and St. John the Evangelist, which commenced in September 2007. The local secondary school, Adamstown Community College, opened in September 2009, and from 69 students entering the school it had around 870 by 2015. The school crest, of a castle, originates from an old castle that used to stand where the school is today. The secondary school is operated by the County of Dublin Vocational Education Committee.

=== Sport ===
Adamstown has an association football (soccer) club and a Gaelic Athletic Association (GAA) club. The football club, Adamstown Football Club, was established in November 2005 and plays in the United Churches League, with two teams (as of 2008). The GAA club, Adamstown GAA club, fields underage teams in hurling (boys) and camogie (girls). The GAA club was authorised on 11 June 2007 at a meeting of the Dublin County Board.

Other clubs include Adamstown Cricket Club, and a cycling club. A new structure, 'Club Adamstown', was being put in place as of 2020 by the local council to offer sporting opportunities, including in cricket, to local children.

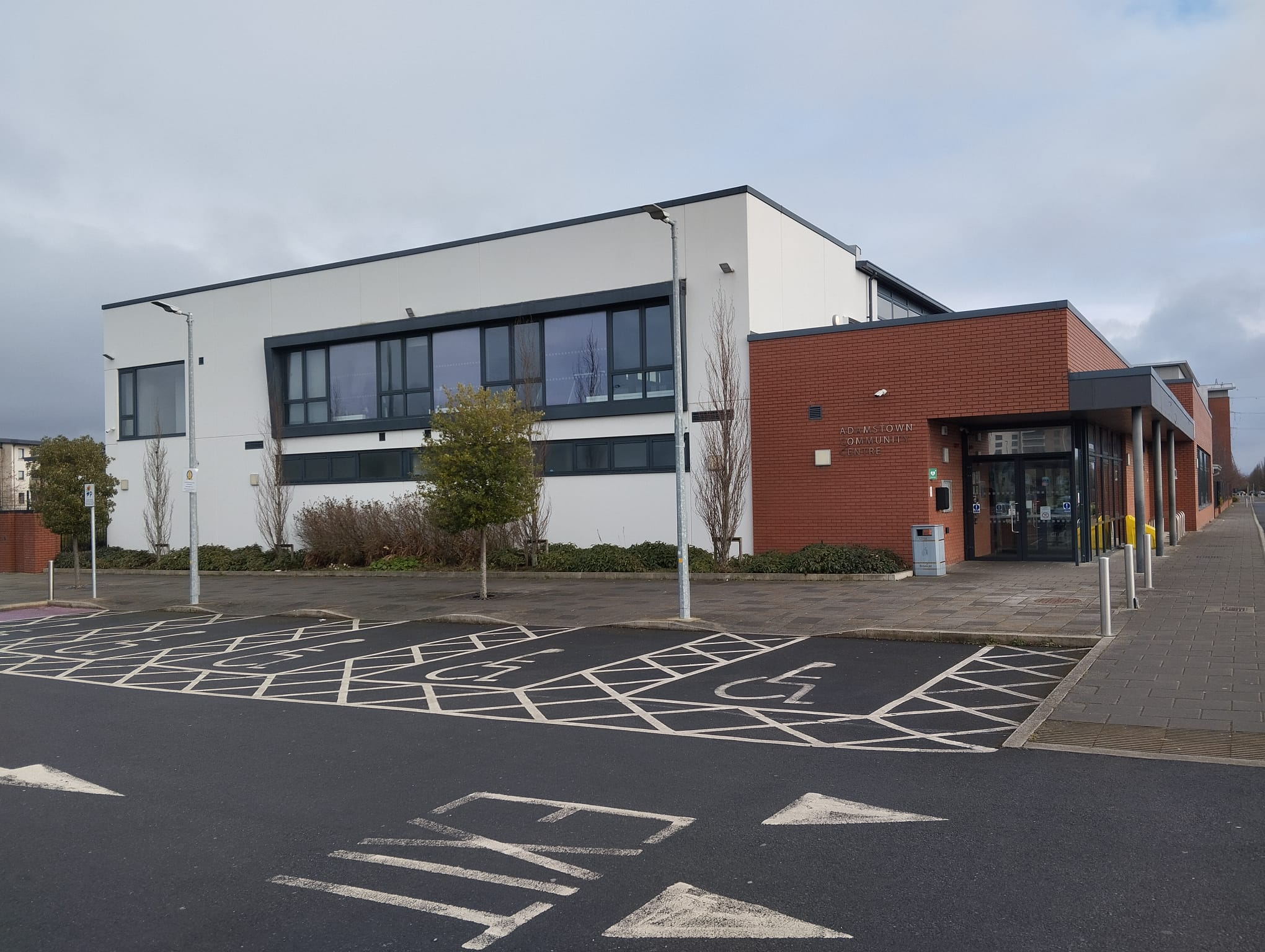
Adamstown Community Centre

The Adamstown Youth and Community Centre, located on Station Road, has a sports hall, an all weather pitch, a gym and meeting rooms.

== Recognition ==
In February 2009, Adamstown won a "Sustainable Communities" award from the UK's Royal Town Planning Institute. It was the only non-UK project to win a prize at the annual ceremony and was entered by South Dublin County Council and Chartridge, the developers (comprising Castlethorn Construction, Maplewood Homes and Tierra Construction). The judges praised the design and layout of Adamstown for its "modern vernacular" and said it would be a "model for development elsewhere".

== See also ==
- List of towns and villages in Ireland
