= Adamstown railway station (Ireland) =

Railway station in County Dublin, Ireland

Adamstown Baile Adaim
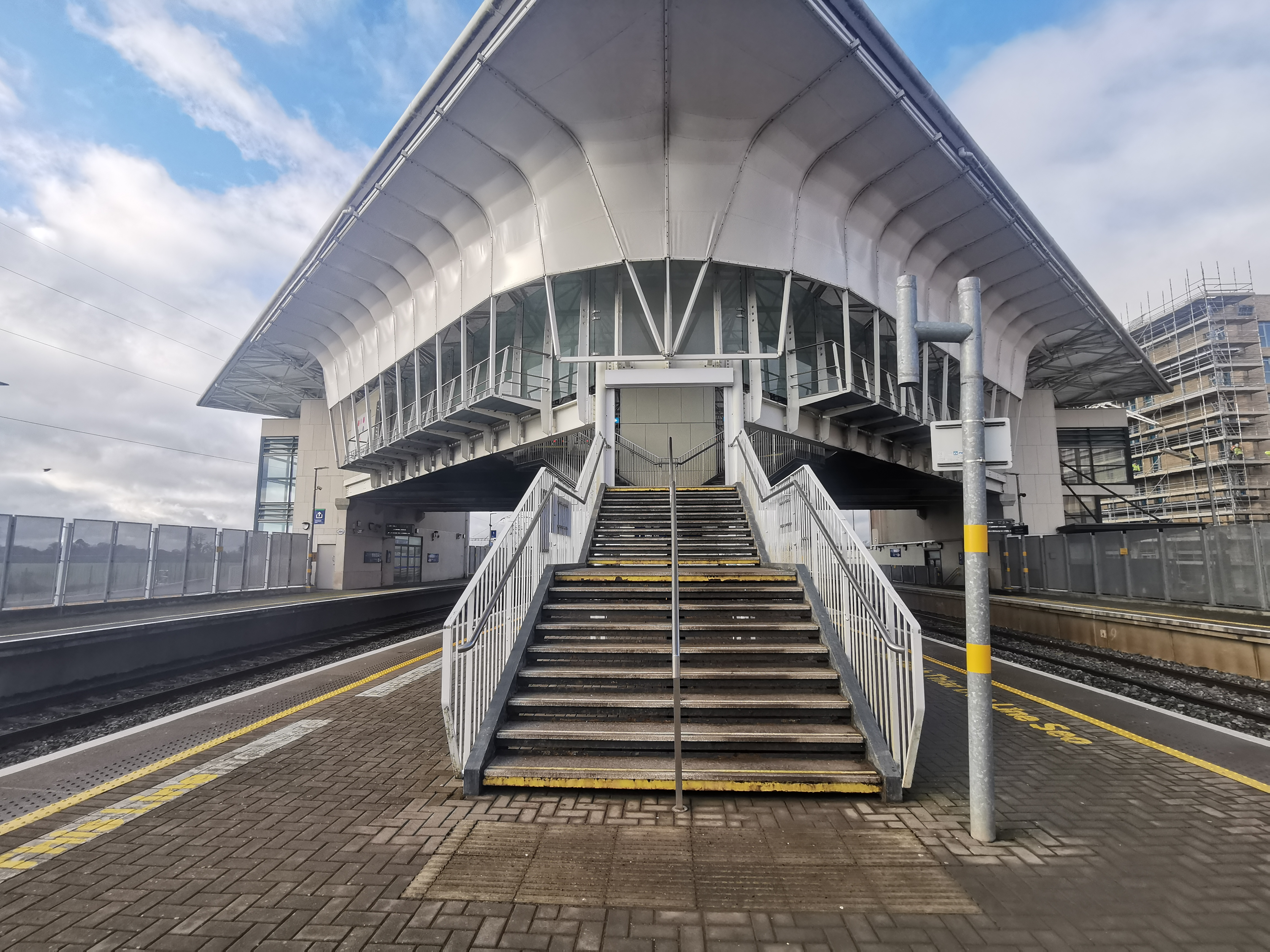
- Adamstown's station building, as seen from platforms 2 and 4.

General information
- Location: Station Road, Adamstown Castle; Lucan, County Dublin; Ireland
- Coordinates: 53.3360°N 6.4701°W
- Owner: Iarnród Éireann
- Operator: Iarnród Éireann
- Transit authority: TFI
- Line: Portlaoise Commuter/ South Western Commuter
- Platforms: 5
- Tracks: 4
- Bus operators: Dublin Bus, Go-Ahead Ireland
- Connections: C1; C2; L51; L52; L53; P29; X30

Construction
- Structure type: At-grade

Other information
- Station code: ADMTN
- Fare zone: 1

History
- Opened: 10 April 2007
Route map
Location

Adamstown railway station is a station on the Dublin to Kildare Commuter service. It serves the new town of Adamstown and South Western Commuter services call to the station.

== History ==
It opened on 10 April 2007. It is 1.1 km west of the old Lucan GSWR station which closed in 1947.

== Description ==
The station has four through platforms and one terminal platform, and was the first Commuter station on the line (other than Dublin Heuston) to have more than two platforms. Following the completion of the Kildare Route Project, which led to the line becoming four-tracked, all platforms could be used.

The station was the first railway station in recent times to be built and paid for by private developers rather than by public money. Another Dublin railway station, Navan Road Parkway on the Western Commuter line, was built in the same manner.

== Services ==
Preceding station	Iarnród Éireann	Following station
Kishoge	Commuter; South Western Commuter	Hazelhatch & Celbridge

== Gallery ==
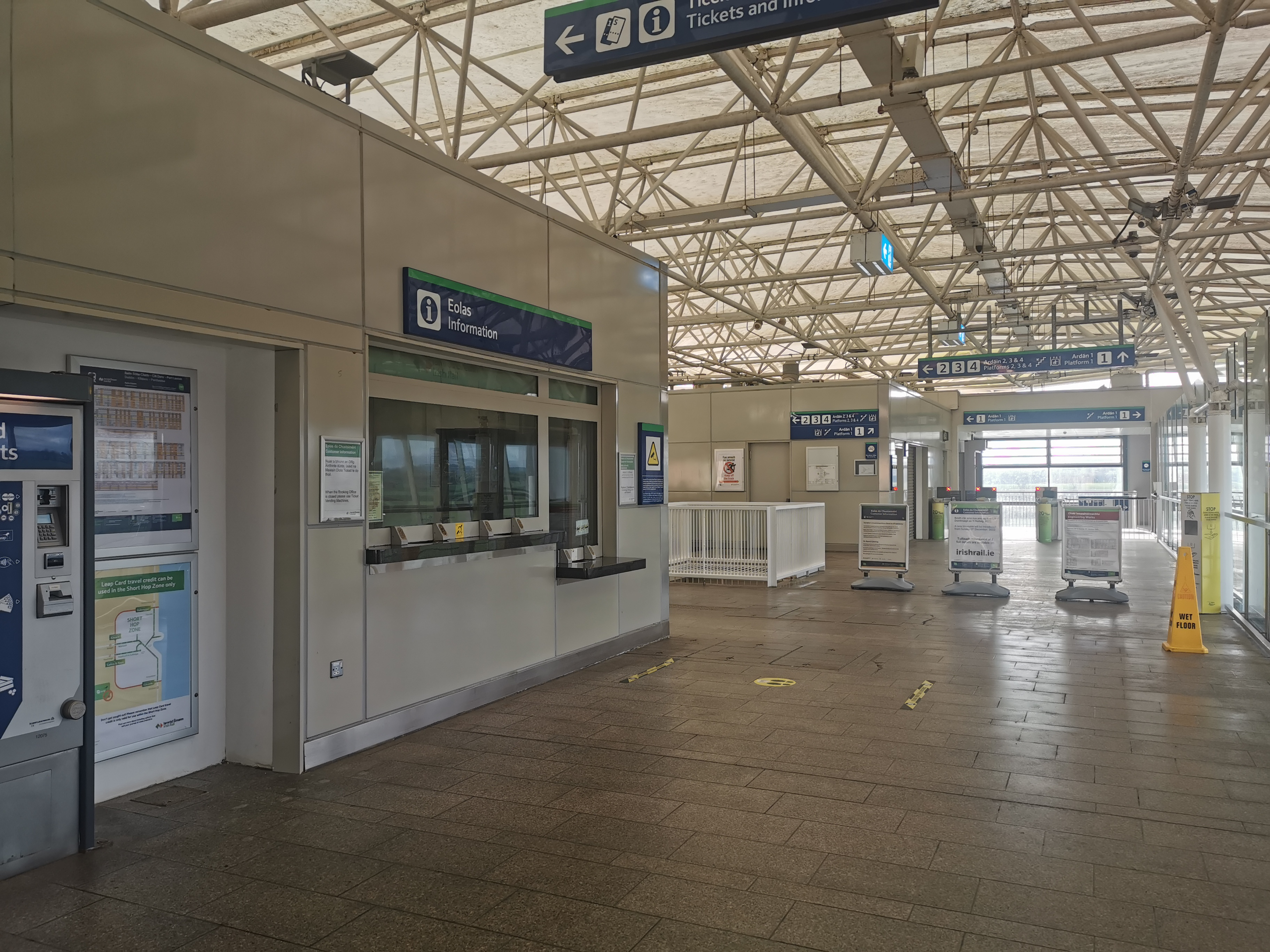
The interior of Adamstown's station building, showing the modern architecture of Irish railway stations from this time period.

== See also ==
- List of railway stations in Ireland
