= Tara Street railway station =

Train station in Dublin, Ireland

Tara Street Sráid na Teamhrach
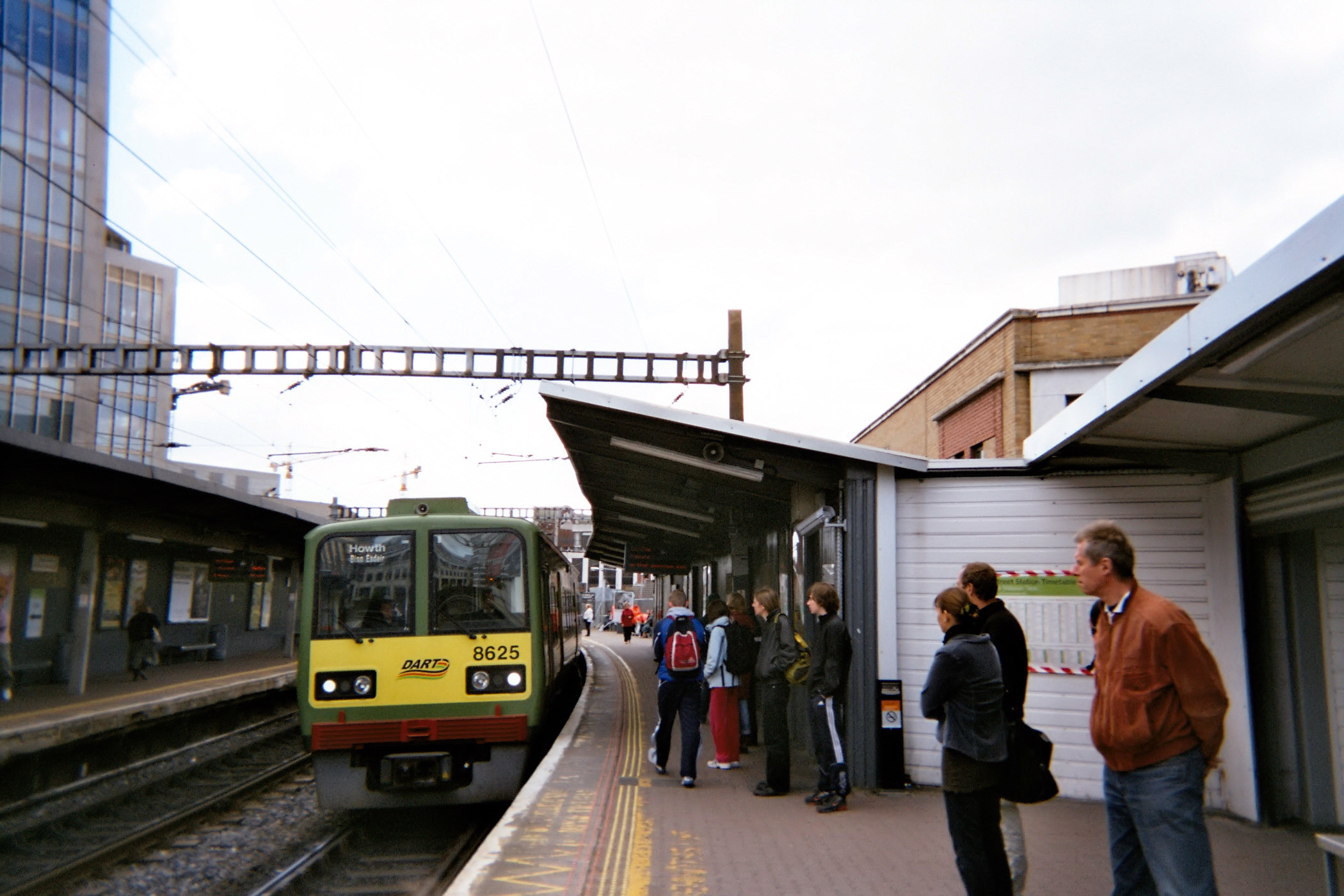
- DART 8520 Class EMU (8625) at Tara Street Station

General information
- Other names: Tara Street & George's Quay
- Location: Tara Street, Dublin 2, D02 WK19; Ireland
- Coordinates: 53.34676°N 6.25414°W
- Owner: Iarnród Éireann
- Operator: Iarnród Éireann
- Platforms: 2
- Tracks: 2
- Bus routes: 23
- Bus operators: Dublin Bus; Go-Ahead Ireland; JJ Kavanagh and Sons; Martley's
- Connections: 47; 52; 60; 65; 65B; 73; 824; C1; C2; C3; C4; C5; C6; P29; X25; X26; X27; X28; X30; X31; X32; 126; 736

Construction
- Structure type: Elevated
- Parking: No
- Cycle facilities: No

Other information
- Station code: TARA
- Fare zone: Suburban 1

Key dates
- 1 May 1891: Station opens
- 1976: Station refurbished
- 1983: Station upgraded
Services
Preceding station	Iarnród Éireann	Following station
Dublin Connolly	InterCity; Dublin-Rosslare	Dublin Pearse
Dublin Connolly	Commuter; Western Commuter (City Branch) (Peak times only)	Dublin Pearse
Dublin Connolly	Commuter; South Eastern Commuter	Dublin Pearse
Dublin Connolly	Commuter; Western Commuter	Dublin Pearse
Dublin Connolly	DART	Dublin Pearse
	Proposed	
Preceding station	Dublin Metro	Following station
O'Connell Street	Metrolink	St Stephen's Green
- Iarnród Éireann; CIÉ; IÉ railway stations
Route map
Location

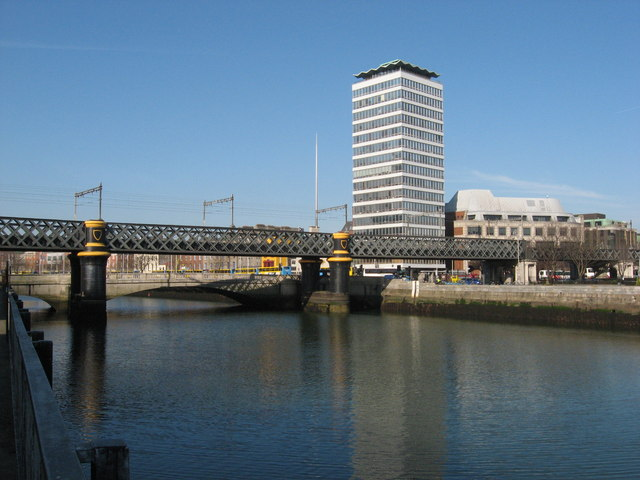
The Loopline Viaduct beside Tara Street

Tara Street sign, (Irish: Sráid na Teamhrach)

Tara Street (Irish: Sráid na Teamhrach) is a railway station in central Dublin, Ireland. It is adjacent to the Loopline Bridge on George's Quay.

It mainly services DART trains and longer distance commuter trains. Commuter services operate to (1) Maynooth and the western suburbs, (2) Balbriggan, Drogheda and Dundalk on the former GNR(I) main line, (3) Gorey and Rosslare Europort and (4) Hazelhatch, Celbridge and Newbridge, through the Phoenix Park Tunnel.

== History ==
The station opened on 1 May 1891.

It is on the 'Loop Line' which was constructed towards the end of the 19th century by the City of Dublin Junction Railway, connecting the Dublin & Kingstown terminus at Westland Row (now Pearse Station) and Amiens St (now Connolly Station) on the Great Northern Railway (Ireland), and linked into the Midland Great Western freight line, thus joining up all the main railways in Dublin.

=== City centre resignalling ===
The completion of the Irish Rail City Centre re-signalling project has seen an increase in the number of Northern and Maynooth line suburban trains stopping at Tara Street, as well as trains from Newbridge serving the station. This was made possible by increasing the ability of the signalling system in the city centre to operate 20 trains per hour in both directions instead of eight. The project began in March 2015 and was commissioned on 17 July 2016.

=== Redevelopment ===
In March 2015, the CIÉ group placed a tender to find a new property development partner for development at Tara Street. The resulting partner, Tanat Ltd, was formed in July 2015 and a resulting plan proposed a €130-million development for an office block of 22 levels. In May 2017, Irish property developer Johnny Ronan announced that he would submit plans to Dublin City Council an 88-metre (289 ft) tower which proposed office space, a hotel, bar, and restaurant. The plan was rejected by Dublin City Council in July 2017, a decision upheld by An Bord Pleanála in March 2018.

In April 2019, An Bord Pleanála approved the plans for a 22-storey tower. Site clearance began in July 2019 but, as of 2024, construction still had not started.

== Layout ==
The station has two through platforms above street level with ticket areas and a retail outlet at street level. The platform retaining walls, the stairwells and canopies were originally timber planking but upgraded to include escalators and fibreglass panels in the 1970s and 1980s.

== Proposals ==
In March 2018, the National Transport Authority (Ireland) (NTA) and Transport Infrastructure Ireland (TII) announced the Metrolink underground Metro project preferred routing and stations. This plan proposed an underground metro station underneath Tara Street railway station.

== See also ==
- List of railway stations in Ireland
