= Kishoge railway station =

Railway station in County Dublin, Ireland

Coordinates: 53.3345°N 6.4304°W

Kishoge An Chiseog
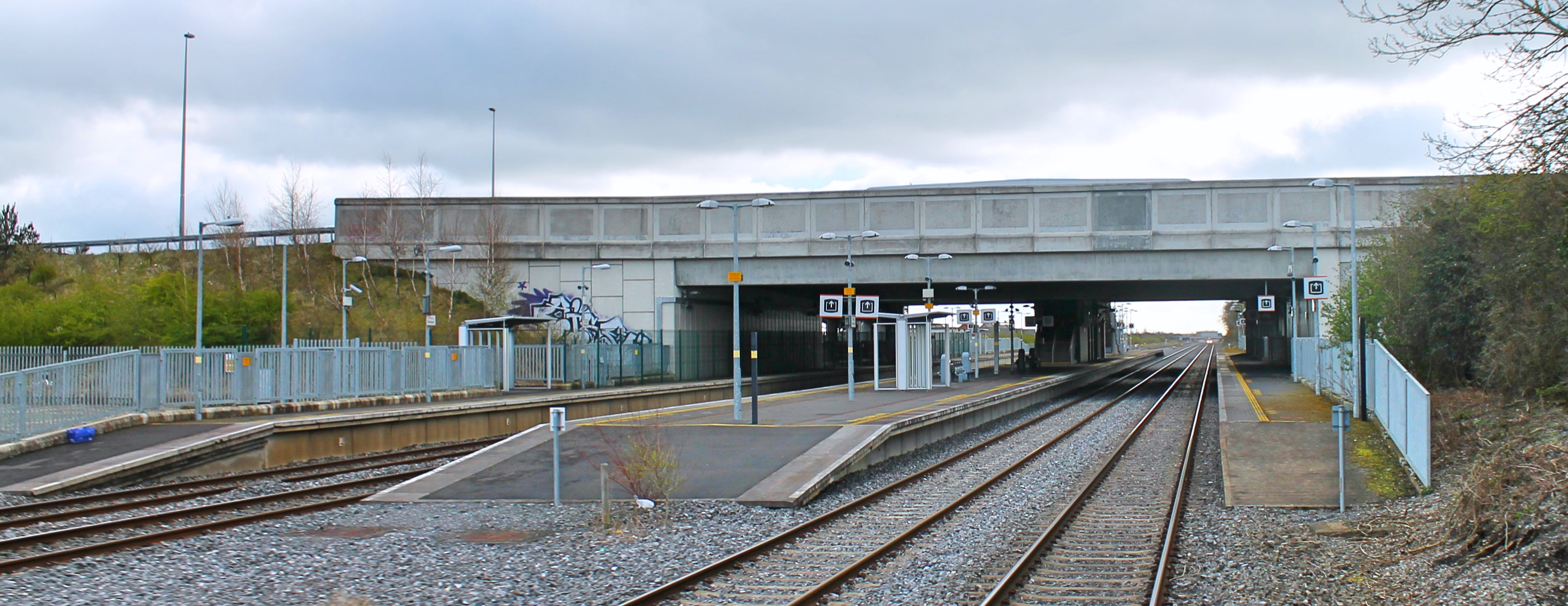
- Kishoge station, as seen from a passing train

General information
- Location: Clonburris, County Dublin; Ireland
- Owner: Iarnród Éireann
- Operator: Iarnród Éireann
- Line: Portlaoise Commuter/ South Western Commuter
- Platforms: 4
- Tracks: 4
- Bus operators: Dublin Bus; Go-Ahead Ireland
- Connections: 151; W4

Construction
- Structure type: At-grade

Other information
- Fare zone: 1

History
- Opened: 26 August 2024; 2 years ago
Route map
Location

Kishoge railway station is an Iarnród Éireann railway station in Dublin, Ireland, serving the Kishoge (sometimes 'Kishogue') housing development. It is located on the South Western Commuter route from Dublin Heuston, and was built as part of the Kildare Route Project. While construction of the station was largely complete in 2009, it was not opened until 2024.

== Development ==
The station was initially built in 2009 for €6 million. It was the last of a series of new and upgraded stations to be built on the route to improve commuter services from the south-west of Dublin.

The station remained unopened for 15 years, with the railway network operator Iarnród Éireann stating that expected local development did not occur because of the post-2008 Irish economic downturn, and "there was a further delay due to the [COVID-19] pandemic".

It was reported in mid-2022 that the station would need refurbishment at a cost of €3.8 million before an anticipated station opening in late 2023, fourteen years after its original completion. By early 2023, it was suggested that this refurbishment could take place between March and November 2023, with the station then proposed to open in December 2023. However, in August 2023 it was reported that the opening would be delayed by at least "six more months".

In early August 2024, it was reported that – following refurbishment and some adjacent road realignment – the station would open later that month. The station opened on 26 August 2024.

Preceding station	Iarnród Éireann	Following station
Clondalkin/ Fonthill	Commuter; South Western Commuter	Adamstown
