= IÉ 29000 Class =

Irish train class

Iarnród Éireann 29000 Class
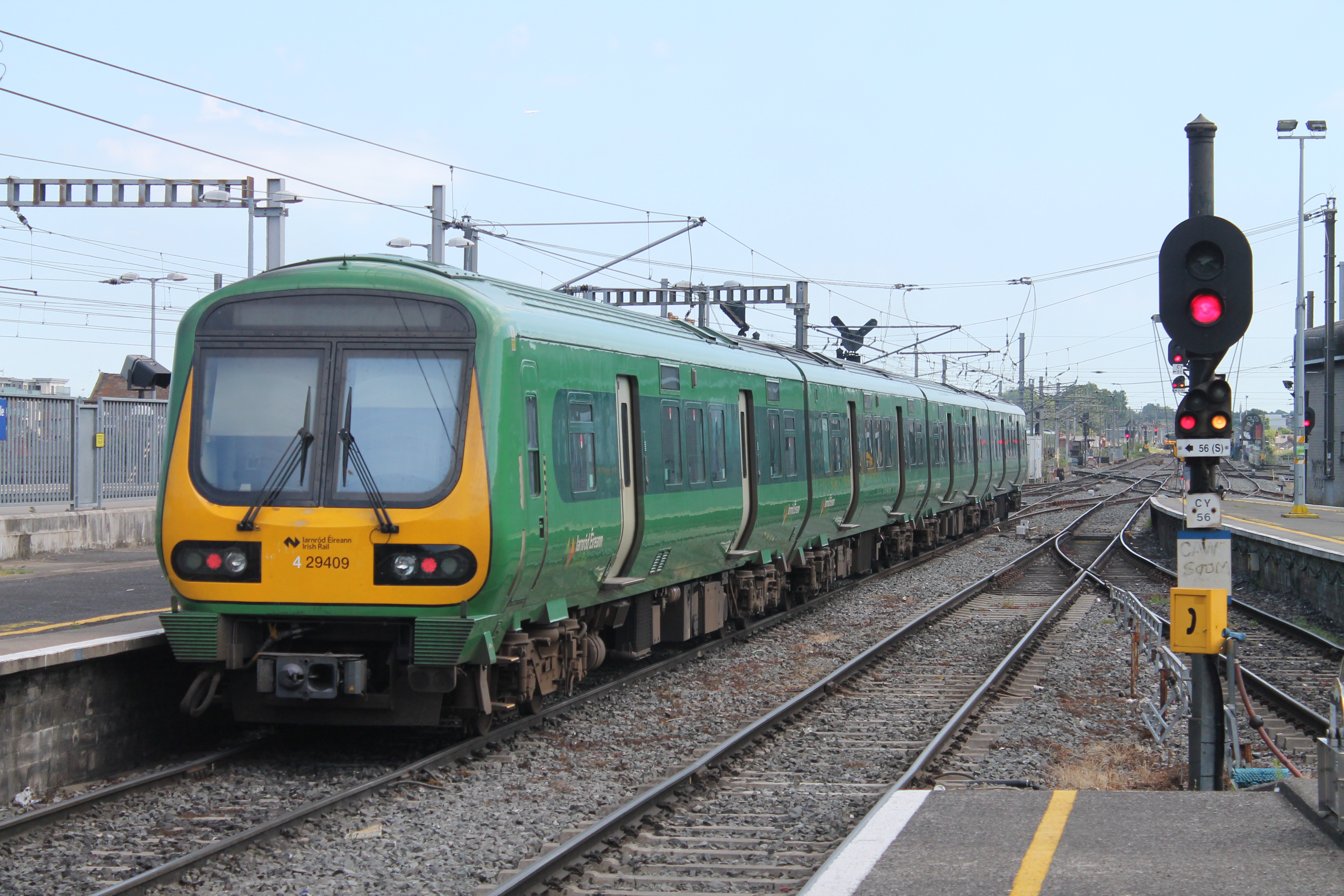
- 29409 departing from platform 4 at Dublin Connolly in July 2016

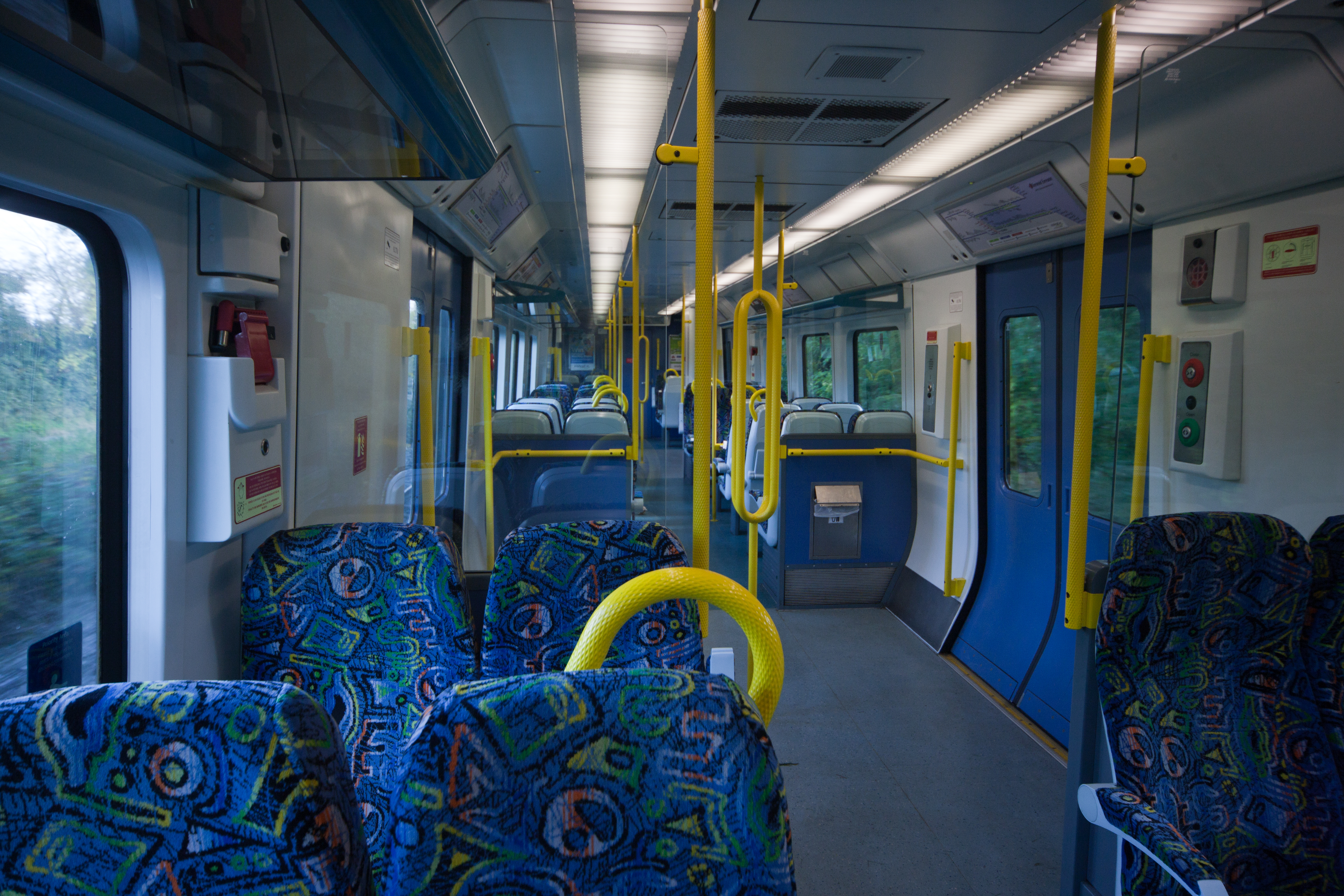
- Interior
- In service: 30 June 2003 – present
- Manufacturer: CAF
- Family name: CxK
- Constructed: 2002 – 2005
- Number built: 29 trainsets
- Formation: 4 cars per trainset
- Fleet numbers: 29001–29029
- Capacity: 185 seated; 634 standing
- Operator: Commuter
- Depot: Drogheda Depot
- Lines served: Dublin - Rosslare; Dundalk Clarke - Dublin; Dublin – Longford

Specifications
- Train length: 81.46 m (267 ft 3 in)
- Width: 2.9 m (9 ft 6 in)
- Height: 3.985 m (13 ft 0.9 in)
- Maximum speed: 75 mph (121 km/h)
- Weight: 43,520 kg (43.52 t)
- Prime mover: MAN D2876
- Power output: 400 hp (300 kW)
- Transmission: Hydraulic, Voith T211
- Braking systems: Air, 2 brake discs per axle
- Track gauge: 1,600 mm (5 ft 3 in) see Rail gauge in Ireland

The Irish Rail 29000 Class (originally 2900 Class) is a type of four-car Diesel Multiple Unit operated by Iarnród Éireann (Irish Rail). The units were built in Spain by CAF in two batches between 2002 and 2005.

== Description ==
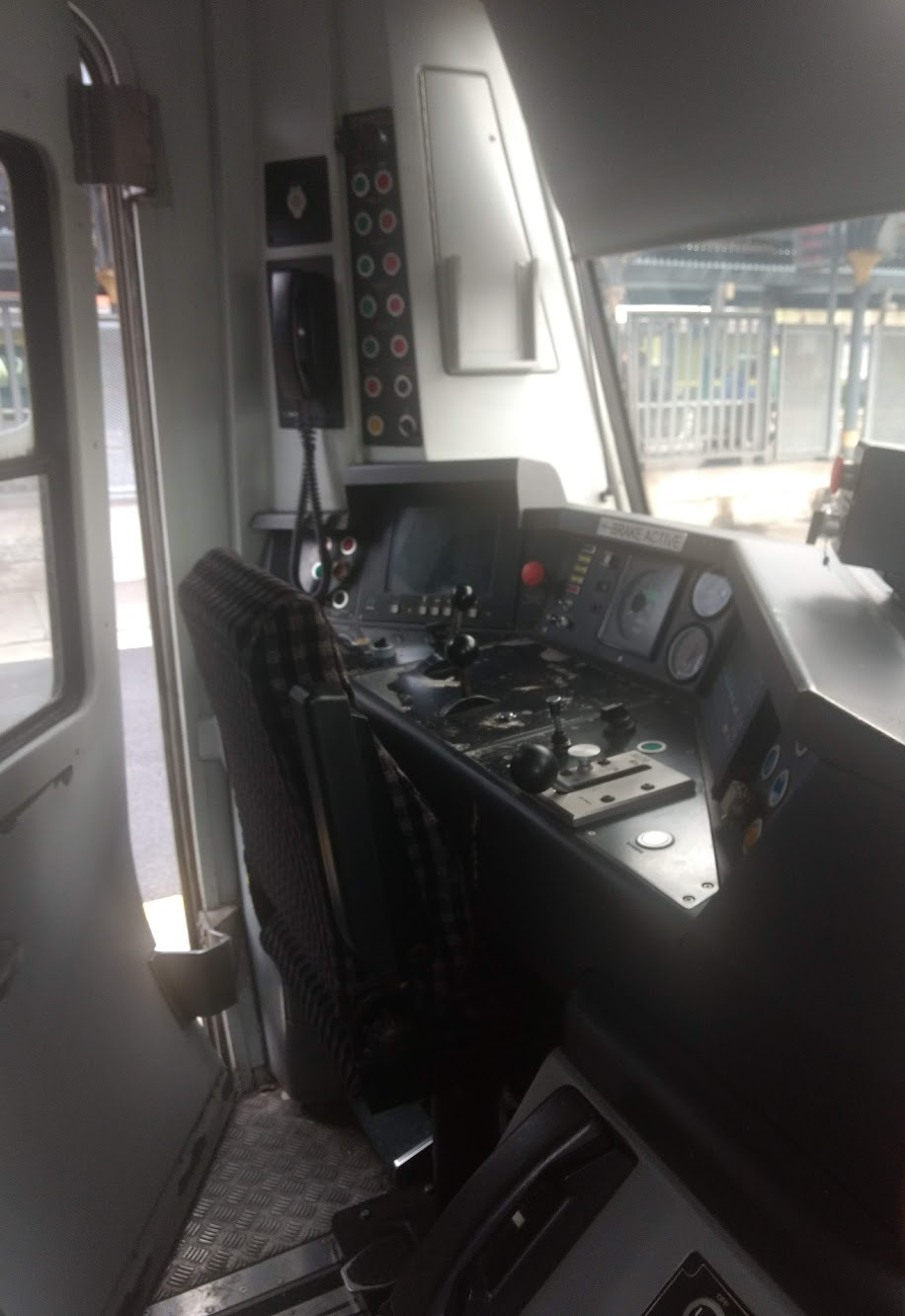
The cab of a 29000 Class unit

Irish Rail ordered the 2900s in 2000 from CAF, the manufacturer's first order from Ireland. The first unit was delivered in February 2002, and they soon began testing in Limerick. The first units entered service in June of that year on the Northern Commuter service, replacing loco-hauled Mk3s.

As a result of the class' success, 9 additional sets were ordered, entering traffic in late 2005. As there wasn't enough numbers spare for the additional sets in the 29xx range, the class became the 29000s (being numbered by set rather than each individual carriage having a number).

The class were delivered in the dark blue "Commuter" livery, making them the first domestic non-DART stock not to be delivered in black and orange since the early 1960s. Starting in the 2010s, the class begun to be repainted into a two-tone green livery. The final units to receive this livery in 2022 had it applied as a vinyl instead of a repaint.

== Deployment ==
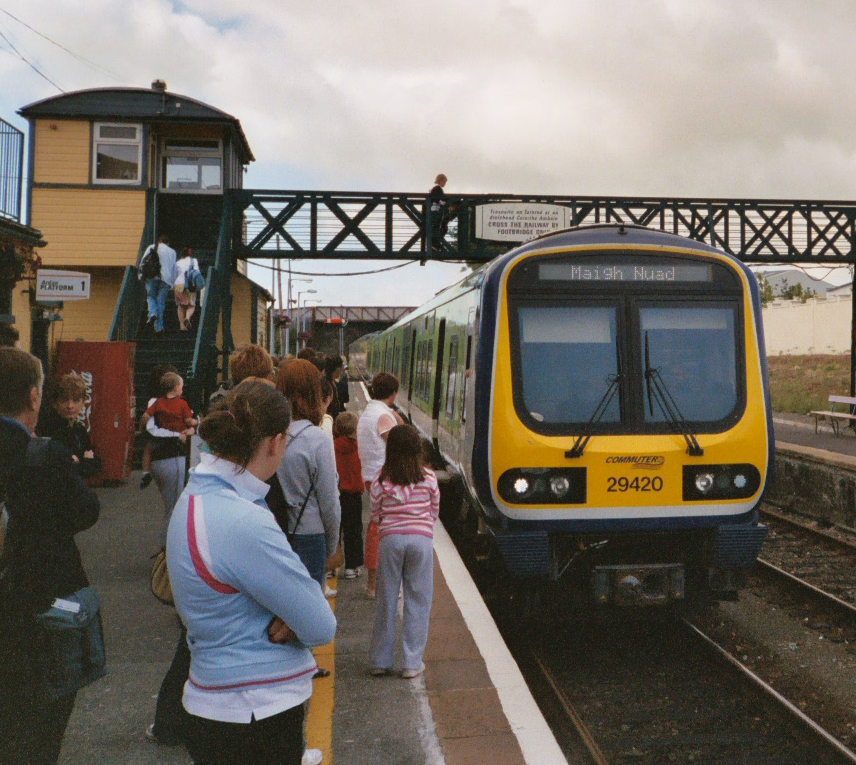
29420 on a Western Commuter service in 2005

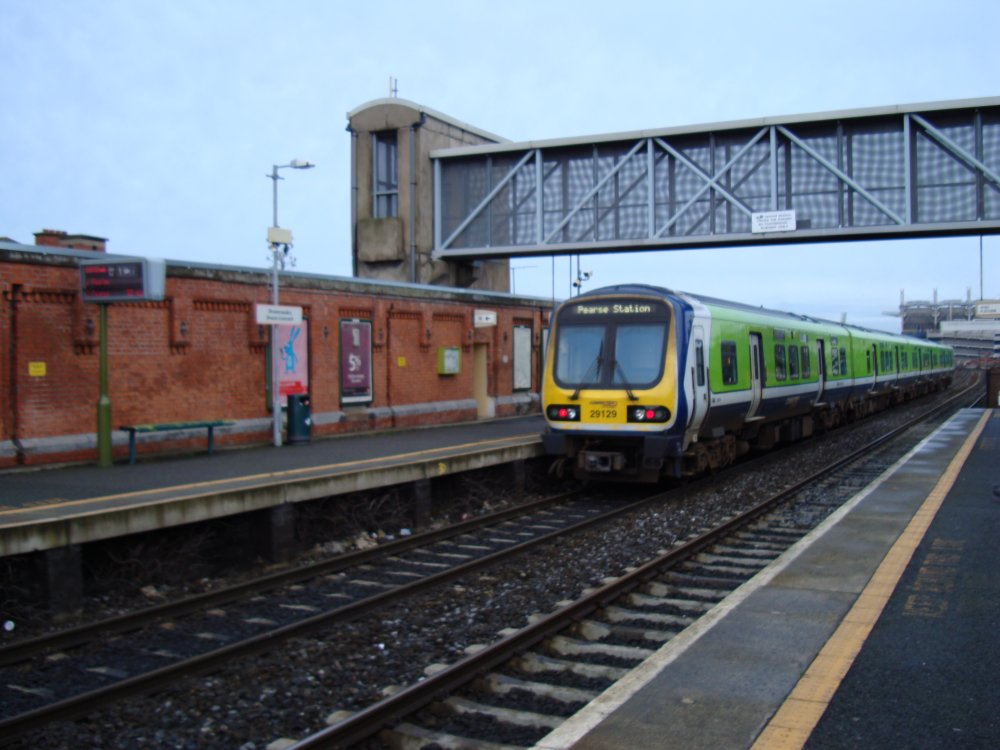
29129 departing Drumcondra in February 2008

For a brief period of time from June 2005 to December 2006, a 29000 railcar operated two journeys on a Sunday to Belfast, departing Dublin Connolly at 15.00 and calling at Drogheda MacBride, Dundalk Clarke, Newry, Portadown, Botanic and Belfast Central (now Belfast Lanyon Place) arriving at 17.14 departing at 18.15 for Dublin. They work most Northern Commuter, South Eastern Commuter and Western Commuter services. They have proven to be a very reliable unit despite operating a variety of demanding services including Dublin - Sligo services. They were largely returned to their intended Commuter services since deliveries of 22000 Class DMUs commenced in 2007, which displaced them from Sligo line workings in 2008, though there are still a few services to and from Rosslare Europort with the 29000 Class DMUs. However, they remained in their "Commuter" livery when working this long-distance line.

The November 2009 timetable change finally saw the end of the 29000s running West of Dublin from Heuston to Newbridge/Kildare and Carlow. The services have been operated by 22000 Class DMUs since 2009.

== Fleet details ==
Class	Operator	Number	Year built	Cars per Set	Unit nos.	Notes
29000 Class	Commuter	20	2002–2003	4	29001 – 29020	
29000 Class	Commuter	9	2005	4	29021 – 29029	29022 fitted with in-cab signalling

== Routes ==
=== Current services ===
==== InterCity ====
- Dublin Connolly to Rosslare Europort

==== Commuter ====
- Grand Canal Dock/Dublin Connolly/Docklands to M3 Parkway/Maynooth/Longford (Western Commuter)
- Grand Canal Dock/Dublin Connolly to Drogheda MacBride/Dundalk Clarke (Northern Commuter)

In addition, these trains occasionally operate services from Dublin Connolly to Belfast Grand Central and Sligo MacDiarmada.

=== Former services ===
==== InterCity ====
- Dublin Connolly to Sligo Mac Diarmada

==== Commuter ====
- Dublin Heuston to Newbridge/Kildare

== In popular culture ==
A 29000 Class unit features in the intro to RTÉ’s Fair City.

A 29000 Class unit features in the film Leap Year.

== Accidents and incidents ==
- On Friday, 21 August 2009, at 6:30 pm a 20m section of the Malahide viaduct collapsed into the Broadmeadow estuary, seconds before a Balbriggan to Dublin Pearse 29000 commuter ran over the section soon to fall into the estuary.
- On Monday,16 November 2009, unit 29026 was derailed near Wicklow when it collided with a landslip obstructing the line.
- On Tuesday, 7 June 2016, one unidentified unit caught fire whilst operating the 09:40 Drogheda to Dublin Pearse service.
- On Friday, 14 May 2021 an unidentified unit caught fire while working a train from Maynooth to Dublin Connolly.
- On Saturday, 29 April 2023, unit 29013 was involved in an incident while working the 13.20 Dublin to Belfast Enterprise service.
- On Friday, 9 August 2024, an unidentified unit caught fire at Broombridge on a Connolly to Maynooth train.

== See also ==
- Multiple Units of Ireland
- NIR 3000 Class
- NIR 4000 Class
- IÉ Class 22000
