= Dublin Suburban Rail =

Railway network in the Dublin area

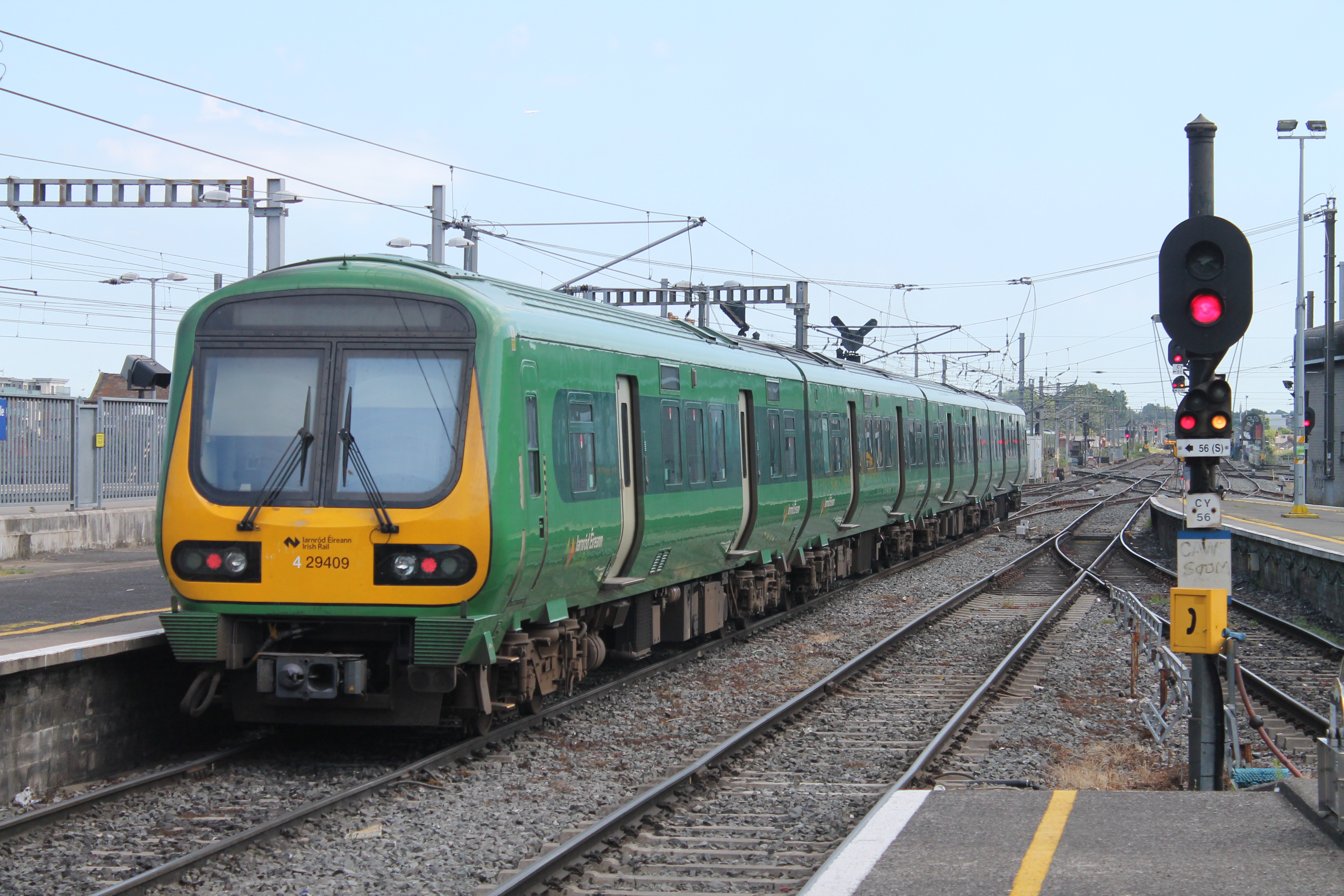
An Iarnród Éireann 29000 Class DMU (29109) at Dublin Connolly

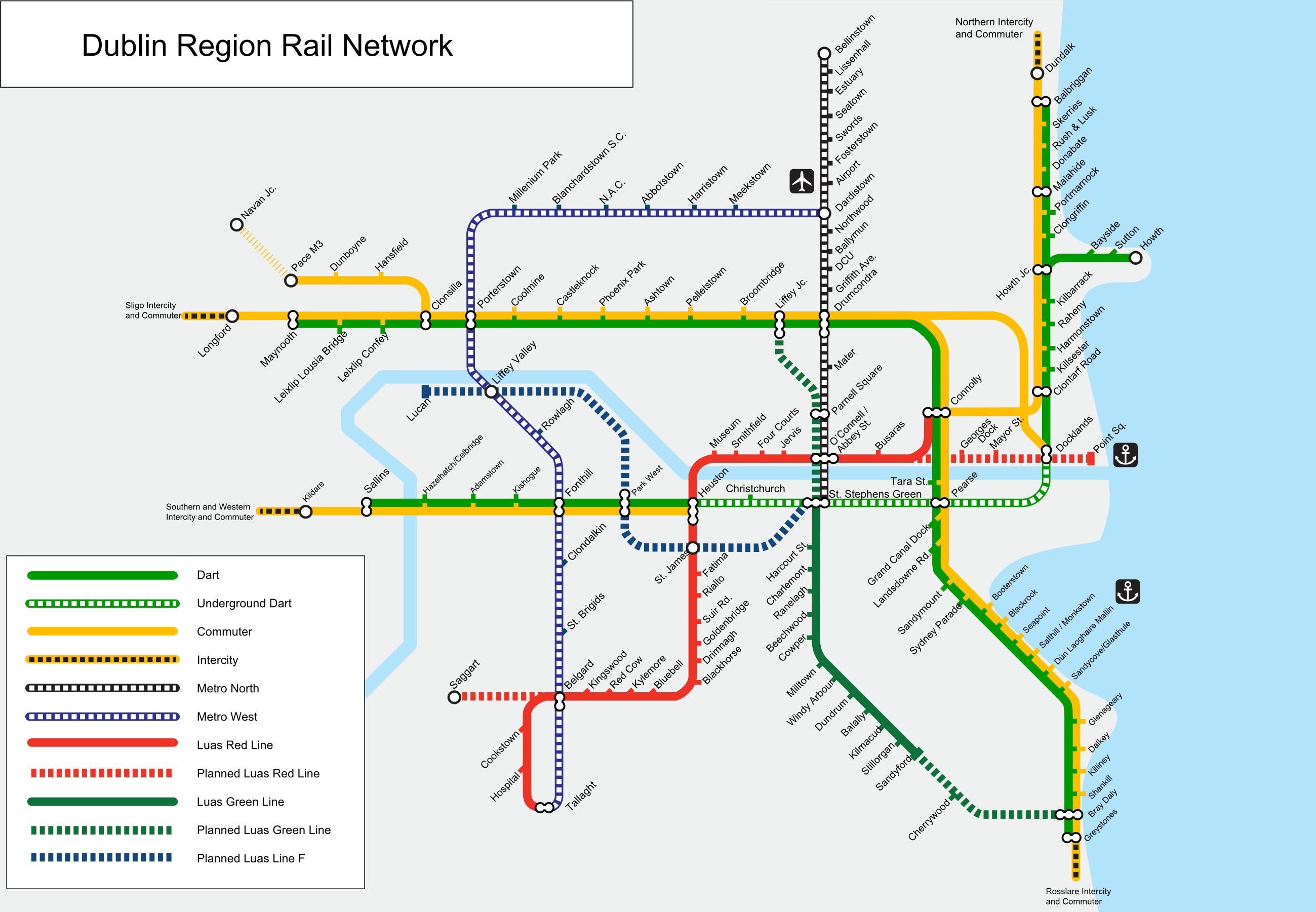
Dublin Suburban Rail Map (proposed network).

The Dublin Suburban Rail (Irish: Iarnród Bruachbhailteach Baile Átha Cliath) network, branded as Commuter, is a railway network that serves the city of Dublin, Ireland, most of the Greater Dublin Area and outlying towns. The system is made up of five lines:

- Northern Commuter - Dublin Pearse to Dundalk Clarke every weekday.
- South Eastern Commuter - Dublin Connolly to Gorey.
- South Western Commuter - Dublin Heuston to Portlaoise/Newbridge. Grand Canal Dock to Hazelhatch and Celbridge/Newbridge via the Phoenix Park Tunnel.
- Western Commuter - Dublin Pearse / Docklands to Longford/M3 Parkway.

In 2018, Commuter services carried 14.6 million passengers, with DART carrying 20 million.

The lines are owned and operated by Iarnród Éireann. The Luas light rail system is not part of this network and is not operated by Iarnród Éireann. As of 2018, the Luas Red Line between Connolly and Heuston Stations is the only one featured on DART network maps, although the Green Line terminates at Broombridge station since late 2017.

== Service frequency ==
Services run from 05:40 to 01:11 from Monday to Saturday and 07:55 to 01:05 on Sunday. However, the frequency varies by line, with the DART service being more frequent (every 10 minutes off-peak, every 4 minutes peak) and services to outer stations being less frequent (up to once every hour off-peak). Fewer trains run on Sunday than any other day, and special timetables may be made for public holidays. There are no services on Christmas Day or St Stephen's Day.

== Rolling stock ==
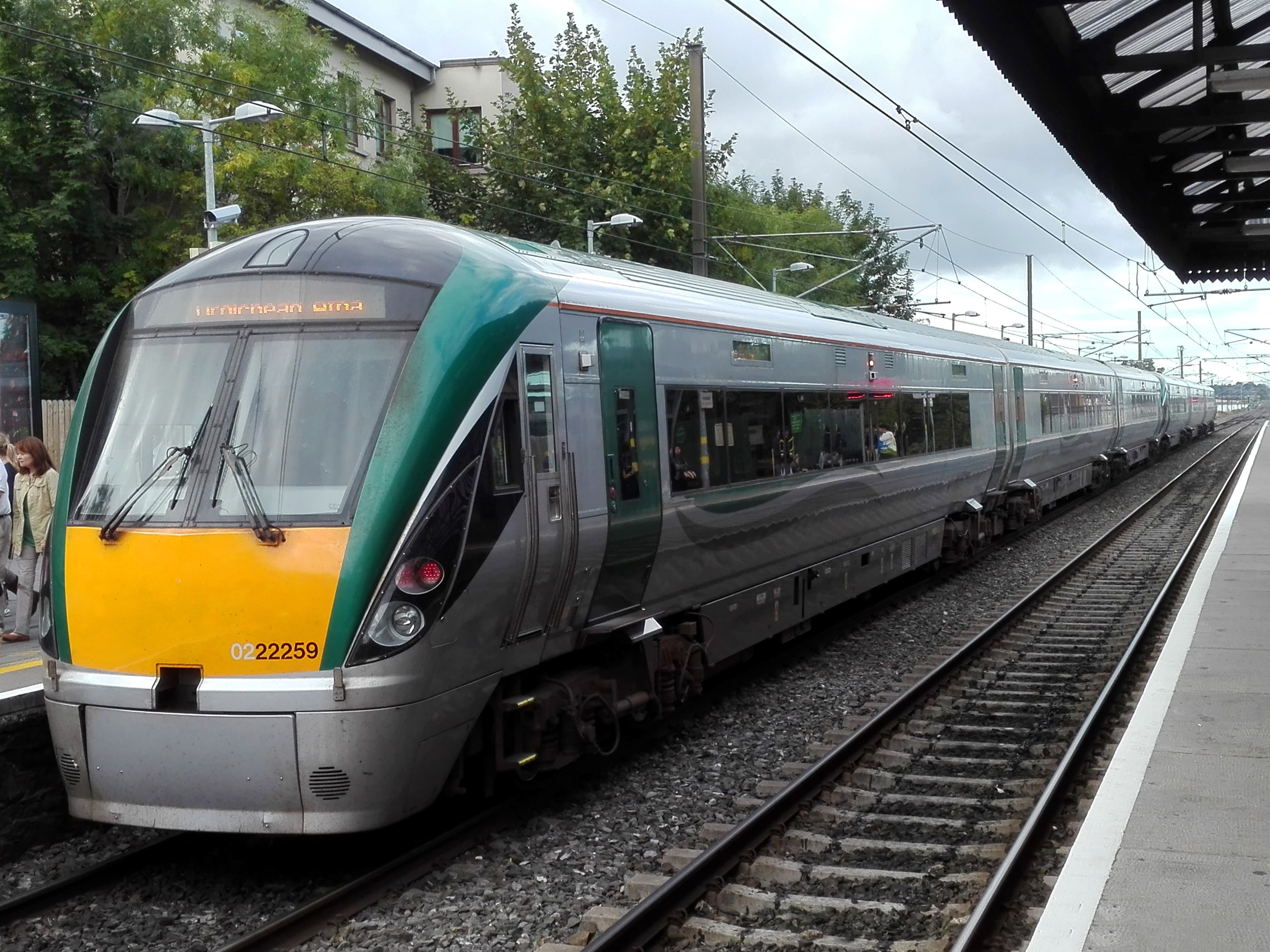
22059 passing Malahide in September 2015

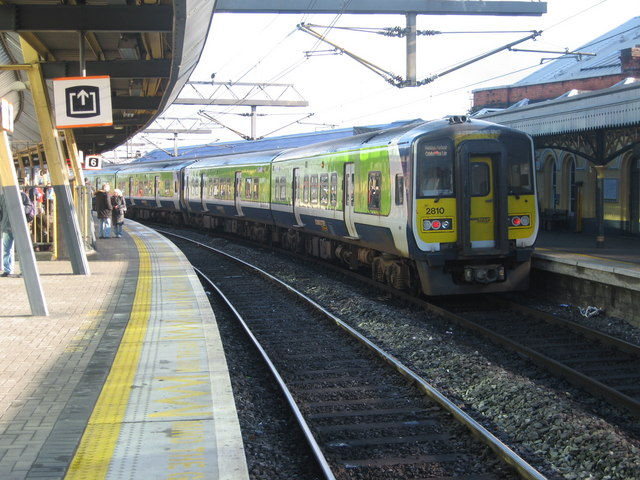
A 2800 Class unit (2810) at Dublin Connolly in 2008

As of 2018, the majority of rolling stock used on the non-DART services are 29000 Class diesel multiple units, with 22000 Class DMUs in use on all South Western Commuter services and some Western and Northern Commuter services. The 29000 Class DMUs are fitted with interior LEDs and automated information systems. 8100 Class electric multiple units form the backbone of the DART services, with 8500, 8510 and 8520 Classes also in use. Locomotive hauled services are no longer used on any DART/Commuter services, although these (typically Cravens trains) were a feature before the delivery of the 2800 Class DMUs in the year 2000.

== Routes ==
=== Northern Commuter ===
Fleet: 29000 Class and 22000 DMUs.

Stations served - Dublin Pearse, Tara Street, Dublin Connolly, Howth Junction, Clongriffin, Portmarnock, Malahide, Donabate, Rush and Lusk, Skerries, Balbriggan, Gormanston, Laytown, Drogheda MacBride, Dundalk Clarke.

Dunleer and/or Dundalk South have been mooted as possible additional stations. The track is shared with the Dublin - Belfast Enterprise service, and DART services as far as Malahide. The bridge at Drogheda MacBride is a single track that may hinder high-frequency services in the long term. The halt at Mosney is no longer used due to the closure of the holiday camp there. Newry (operated by Translink NI Railways) was previously served by Northern Commuter services until the timetable change in September 2024, which introduced the hourly Enterprise service. This change eliminated the need for the single morning commuter service and the return evening service, freeing up capacity along the network. Previously, tickets for these Newry commuters could not be purchased online, as it was operated by Irish Rail, which does not sell tickets from Northern Ireland services on irishrail.ie, while Translink also never offered these tickets for sale online.

Iarnród Éireann envisaged electrification as far as Drogheda MacBride by 2030, with the stations between Drogheda MacBride and Malahide incorporated into a new DART service between Drogheda MacBride and Hazelhatch and Celbridge by 2022.

=== South Eastern Commuter ===
Fleet: 29000 Class DMUs. Stations served - Dublin Connolly, Tara Street, Dublin Pearse, Lansdowne Road, Sydney Parade, Blackrock, Dún Laoghaire, Bray, Greystones, Kilcoole, Wicklow, Rathdrum, Arklow and Gorey.

The services share track with the mainline service to Rosslare and the DART service as far as Greystones. The line is single track from Bray onwards. This is the least frequent DART/Commuter service, with only one train daily.

=== South Western Commuter ===
Sometimes called the "Portlaoise Commuter" or the "Portlaoise Commuter Line", this was previously known as the "Arrow" service and served stations as far as Kildare. This service was extended in January 2013 to include more commuter towns including Portarlington and a new commuter terminus in Portlaoise.

Fleet: IE 22000 Class DMUs. Stations served - City branch: Dublin Heuston, Park West & Cherry Orchard, Clondalkin & Fonthill, Kishoge, Adamstown, Hazelhatch & Celbridge, Sallins & Naas, Newbridge, Kildare, Monasterevin, Portarlington and Portlaoise.

Grand Canal Dock branch: Grand Canal Dock, Dublin Pearse, Tara Street, Dublin Connolly, Drumcondra, Park West & Cherry Orchard, Clondalkin / Fonthill, Kishoge, Adamstown, Hazelhatch & Celbridge, Sallins & Naas and Newbridge.

This service is the newest Dublin DART/Commuter line. It was launched in 1994 as the "Arrow" service, shortly after the delivery of the then Arrow-branded 2600 Class railcars. Cherry Orchard, Clondalkin, Hazelhatch and Celbridge and Sallins and Naas stations were opened on the same day, although stations had previously existed on some of these sites. Newbridge station had previously been an InterCity station, though Commuter trains now mainly serve it. The stations on the line were at the time of launch all "Arrow" branded also, though this branding has now been removed. This line is connected directly with the rest of the network, despite being operated out of the Dublin Heuston terminus, by the Phoenix Park Tunnel, the Luas and Dublin Bus routes 145, C1, C2, C3, C4 and the 46a which operate to within a short walk of Tara Street. In 2013, due to increased demand from commuters in the North East Laois commuter zone, the service was extended to Portlaoise with first trains departing Portlaoise at 5.40 and last train from Heuston 22:10 to Portlaoise with a later 23:10 serving to Kildare. Trains run every hour with extra trains on Monday-Friday in the mornings and in the evenings.

A station used only occasionally for "special" trains also existed at the Curragh, until it was closed in 1999. The station at Cherry Orchard was relocated to Park West & Cherry Orchard in July 2008 and Clondalkin was located further west as Clondalkin & Fonthill on the Fonthill Road in October 2008. This work was part of the Kildare Route Project, which included quadruple-tracking the line between Le Fanu Road (east of the former Cherry Orchard station) to just beyond Hazelhatch. Another new station was built between Adamstown and Clondalkin at Kishoge, which is located adjacent to the Lucan Outer Ring Road. This station was completed in 2009, however no funding was available in order to construct an access road and adjacent car park. It opened in 2024.

On 21 November 2016 the first trains ran from Grand Canal Dock through the Phoenix Park Tunnel serving Newbridge.

Electrification to Hazelhatch is planned under the DART+ South West project .

=== Western Commuter ===
Fleet: 29000 Class and 22000 Class DMUs. Stations served - City branch: Dublin Pearse, Tara Street, Dublin Connolly, Drumcondra, Broombridge, Pelletstown, Ashtown, Navan Road Parkway, Castleknock, Coolmine, Clonsilla, Leixlip Confey, Leixlip Louisa Bridge, Maynooth, then continuing onto Kilcock, Enfield, Mullingar, Edgeworthstown and Longford.

Docklands/Dunboyne branch: Docklands, Broombridge, Pelletstown, Ashtown, Navan Road Parkway, Castleknock, Coolmine, Clonsilla, Hansfield, Dunboyne, and M3 Parkway.

This service had been operated as a limited-service from November 1981 until 1990, serving Ashtown (opened January 1982), Clonsilla, Leixlip (now Leixlip Louisa Bridge) and Maynooth. In 1990, new stations were opened at Broombridge, Castleknock, Coolmine and Leixlip Confey. Another station at Drumcondra was re-opened in March 1998. Most of the station buildings on this line were a mixture of small block built booking offices and converted steel cabins and there was still a limited service owing to the single track between Clonsilla and Maynooth.

In 2001, a major upgrade project took place, with the upgrading of the line between Clonsilla and Maynooth to double track, the entire line being upgraded to continuous welded rail, the building of permanent station buildings at all stations except Broombridge, the replacement of the semaphore signalling with computerised traffic control, and the provision of real-time information displays at stations. These, however, apart from the ones at Drumcondra, were not in use until February 2012.

From 12 March 2007, several additional weekday services operate on the Maynooth line. However, these only operated from Clonsilla, serving the existing stations to Broombridge, and then terminate at the new Docklands railway station. These did not serve either Drumcondra or the central Dublin stations, or the stations beyond Clonsilla.

On 3 September 2010, the first trains ran from Docklands onto the Dunboyne branch serving Dunboyne and M3 Parkway. In June 2013, another station opened on this branch called Hansfield serving Ongar and Clonee areas. It is planned that these services will run eventually to Navan, becoming the proposed Meath Commuter.

On 21 January 2008, the then-named Phoenix Park railway station opened. This station is located beside the R147 dual carriageway in Ashtown, and despite its former name is not located in the Phoenix Park, but was built to serve the Phoenix Park Racecourse Apartments constructed on grounds of the former racecourse adjacent to the park. To avoid confusion, this station was renamed Navan Road Parkway in 2011.

In February 2014, Iarnród Éireann announced an improvement programme for the Western Commuter line, which includes the removal of level crossings at Ashtown, Coolmine, Porterstown and two crossings at Clonsilla. The level crossing on the Ratoath Road has been replaced by an overbridge which was completed in February 2015. Further improvements, including the remaining level crossing works, electrification to Maynooth and a new depot west of Maynooth are now covered by the DART+ West plan.

=== Dublin Area Rapid Transit (DART) ===
See separate Dublin Area Rapid Transit article.

== See also ==
- Dublin Metro
- Belfast Suburban Rail
- Cork Suburban Rail
- Galway Suburban Rail
- Limerick Suburban Rail
