= Hazelhatch =

Hazelhatch Collchoill
- Townland
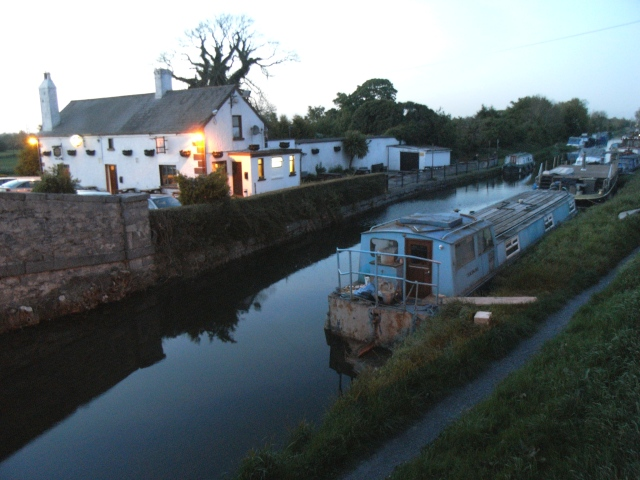
- The Grand Canal at Hazelhatch

- Location in Ireland
- Coordinates: 53.3212°N 6.5231°W
- Country: Ireland
- Province: Leinster
- County: County Dublin
- Local government area: South Dublin
- Civil parish: Newcastle
- Time zone: UTC+0 (WET)
  - Summer (DST): UTC-1 (IST (WEST))
- Irish grid reference: N 98853 31122

Hazelhatch (Irish: Collchoill) is a townland in County Dublin on the border with County Kildare in Ireland. It is located on the R405 regional road, approximately halfway between Celbridge and Newcastle. Hazelhatch is one of the places of recreational activity along the Grand Canal, with fishing and boating. There is one pub in Hazelhatch, beside the canal. Although there is no conventional village centre, there is a concentration of one-off houses in the surrounding area. As of the 2011 census, Hazelhatch townland had a population of 62 people.

== Transport ==
The Heuston main railway line to Dublin eastwards and Cork, Limerick and Galway westwards passes through Hazelhatch. Hazelhatch and Celbridge railway station opened on 4 August 1846 and closed for goods traffic on 9 June 1947.

During the mid 2000's the railway line was expanded from double track to quadruple track, in order to improve the commuter and intercity services. There was a proposal to electrify the line between Hazelhatch and Dublin, but this was shelved following the post-2008 Irish economic downturn. Hazelhatch is referred by railwaymen and trainspotters as 'The Hatch'. Nearby Stacumny Bridge is one of the most popular places in Ireland for trainspotting due to the quadruple tracks, the frequency and high speeds of trains and the freight and engineering trains that must pass here leaving Dublin.

Hazelhatch is located equidistant from the M4 at Celbridge and the N7 Naas Road. Other nearby places include Lyons House, Stacumny House and Ardclough.
