= Grand Canal Dock railway station =

Train station in Dublin, Ireland

Grand Canal Dock Dug na Canálach Móire
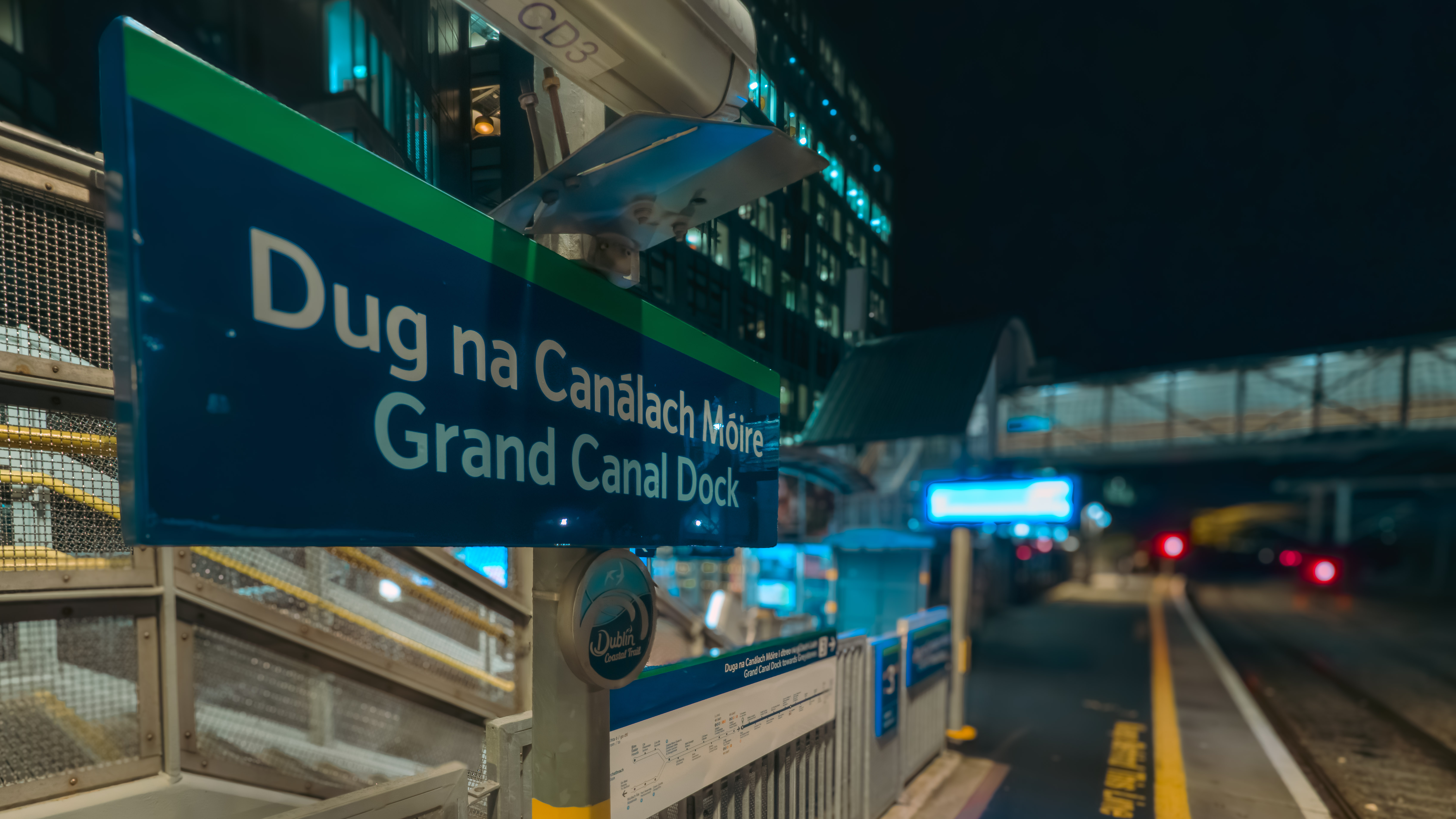

General information
- Location: 44-47 Barrow Street; Dublin, D04 C3H6; Ireland
- Coordinates: 53.33961°N 6.23771°W
- Owner: Iarnród Éireann
- Operator: Iarnród Éireann
- Platforms: 3
- Tracks: 3

Construction
- Structure type: Elevated
- Parking: No
- Cycle facilities: Yes
- Accessible: Yes

Other information
- Station code: GCDK
- Fare zone: Suburban 1

History
- Opened: 23 January 2001

Key dates
- November 2014: Refurbishment commences
- July 2016: Refurbishment completed
Location

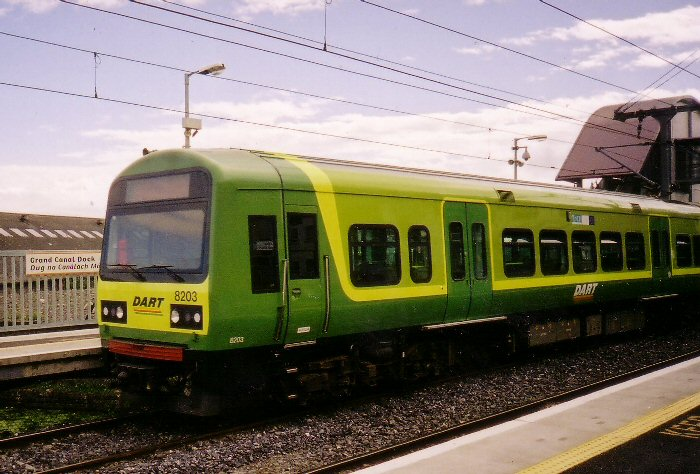
Now withdrawn DART 8200 Class (8203) operating a southbound service at Grand Canal Dock

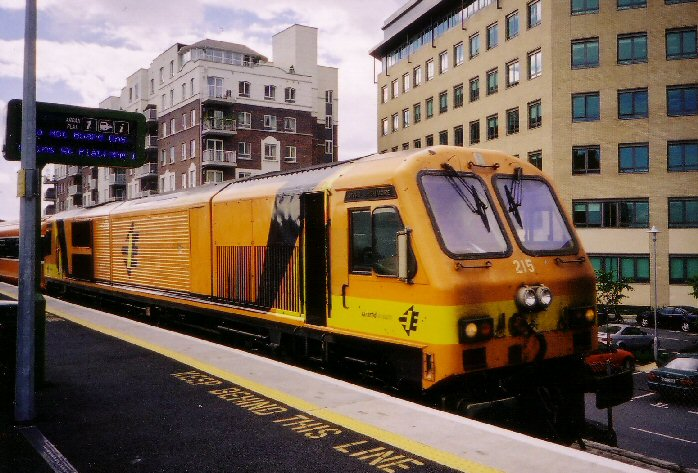
Iarnrod Eireann Class 201 at Grand Canal Dock's platform 1

Grand Canal Dock railway station (Irish: Stáisiún Dug na Canálach Móire) serves the Grand Canal Dock area in Dublin, Ireland.

== Description ==
Like several stations in central Dublin such as Tara Street railway station, Dublin Pearse railway station and Clontarf Road railway station, it is elevated above street level, with steps leading down to Barrow Street in South Lotts, beside Google's European headquarters. A lift is available for access from street level.

The information office is only staffed during events at the Aviva Stadium. The station typically closes for two hours after such events in the interest of crowd control.

The station has three platforms. Platform 1 is a former terminal platform, which became the Northbound main line on 18 July 2016. Platform 2 is the terminal platform for South Western Commuter trains to Newbridge. Platform 3 is the Southbound main line platform. Platforms 1 and 2 are accessed by footbridges and lifts. Platform 3 has level access.

== History ==
Grand Canal Dock was built on the site of the former locomotive works of the Dublin & Kingstown Railway and its successors, which was in use between 1840 and 1925.

Between November 2014 and July 2016, the station underwent a major refurbishment to prepare it to serve South Western Commuter trains to Newbridge, which commenced operations on 21 November 2016. Irish Rail rebuilt platform 1, resurfaced the other platforms, installed new destination displays, and provided a new evacuation bridge. Platform 1 lacked overhead electric cables and had a permanent sign reading "Do not board any trains at platform 1" that was removed in May 2015. Platform 1 was fitted with overhead cables in November 2015. Irish Rail also added a centre road terminating turn-back facility to accommodate southbound trains. The refurbishment of the station itself was completed in May 2015, although major resignalling and track work took place for one more year.

=== City Centre Resignalling ===
The new signalling was commissioned, along with platform 1, on 17 July 2016.

The completion of the Irish Rail City Centre resignalling project has provided for

- An increase in the number of Northern and Maynooth line suburban trains stopping at Grand Canal Dock
- Trains from Newbridge terminating at Grand Canal Dock

This has been made possible by making available all three platforms at Grand Canal Dock and increasing the ability of the signalling system in the city centre to operate 20 trains per hour in both directions instead of 8.

== See also ==
- List of railway stations in Ireland

| Preceding station | Iarnród Éireann | Following station |
|---|---|---|
| Dublin Pearse | Commuter; South Eastern Commuter (City Branch) | Lansdowne Road or Terminus |
| Dublin Pearse | DART | Lansdowne Road |
