= MetroLink (Dublin) =

Planned metro line in Dublin, Ireland

Overview
- Status: Procurement and tendering
- Owner: Transport Infrastructure Ireland
- Locale: County Dublin, Ireland
- Termini: Estuary; Charlemont
- Stations: 16
- Website: metrolink.ie

Service
- Type: Metro
- Depot: Dardistown

History
- Planned opening: No earlier than 2035

Technical
- Line length: 18.8 km (11.7 mi)
- Num of tracks: 2
- Track gauge: 1,435 mm (4 ft 8 1/2 in) standard gauge
- Minimum radius: 350 m (1,150 ft)
- Electrification: 1,500 V DC overhead line
- Operating speed: 80 km/h (50 mph)
- Signalling: CBTC with GoA4

MetroLink is a planned metro line in Dublin, Ireland. It replaces an earlier Metro North proposal, which was first recommended in the Government of Ireland's 2005 Transport 21 transport plan.

The line is planned to run from Estuary, north of Swords on Dublin's Northside, to Charlemont on the city's Southside, with stops at Dublin Airport, O'Connell Street, Tara Street and St Stephen's Green. The route is planned as a fully segregated, driverless metro, with tunnels beneath Dublin Airport and the city centre.

While the government stated in 2022 that MetroLink could be in operation in the early 2030s, later updates indicated a longer period of time. The Railway Order became operative in January 2026, after which the project moved into the procurement stage for its major infrastructure packages. As of September 2026, construction was set to begin by 2027, and anticipated to take eight to ten years. As of 2026, no official opening date had been confirmed.

== History ==
=== Initial proposals ===
The original idea for the two Metro lines in Dublin can be traced to the November 2001 "Platform for Change" report by the Dublin Transportation Office, now part of the National Transport Authority. The purpose of the report was to come up with an integrated transportation strategy for the greater Dublin region. In its report, the DTO outlined plans for three Metro lines. The first was a north–south line which would run from Swords to Shanganagh via Dublin Airport, Finglas, Broadstone, the city centre, Ranelagh, Sandyford and Cherrywood. The second would link Tallaght West to Tallaght and then continue through the south-western suburbs of Dublin to the city centre. The third line would run in an orbital pattern, with a spur off the Swords-Shanganagh line at Finglas and then continue via Blanchardstown and Clondalkin to Tallaght, where it would connect with the other line.

Dublin Airport carried over 21 million passengers in 2006. This figure was projected to grow rapidly (as it did to 27.9 million by 2016). As a result, Transport Infrastructure Ireland (TII) identified a medium-capacity public-transport link to Dublin Airport as one of the most important gaps in the Dublin rail network. Two options were seen as a solution to the problem:

- A spur off the existing DART line to Dublin Airport, as proposed by Iarnród Éireann.
- A metro system, running from Swords through Dublin Airport and on to the city centre, in line with the National Transport Authority's suggestions.

The metro option emerged as the preferred option, as it provided both an airport link and a commuter link. It was described by TII as "an important commuter link for the communities and institutions of North Dublin City and County". Metro North (from Swords to St. Stephen's Green) and Metro West were adopted as government policy with the launch of the Transport 21 programme in 2005.

Three potential routes for Metro North were published by the Railway Procurement Agency in February 2006. The first route option went through Finglas and made use of the former Broadstone railway alignment. The second route option went through Ballymun and was eventually adopted as the final route. The third route option went through Whitehall. After public consultation, the RPA announced in October 2006 that they had selected a routing known as the 'East/Central Combined Route' that ran through Ballymun. A slightly updated route, with changes in proposed station names, some modifications to station locations, and details of proposed overground and underground routes through Swords was released by the RPA in March 2008.

On 22 March 2007, TII began the procurement process for Metro North. In October 2007 it announced that it had a shortlist of four consortia interested in building Metro North. Draft Environmental Impact Statements were published in early 2008. On 17 September 2008, the RPA applied for a railway order to An Bord Pleanála. Oral hearings were heard during 2009 and 2010. On 5 October 2011, Metro North was granted planning permission by An Bord Pleanála.

It was speculated by the media that the Metro North Project would be indefinitely deferred on 12 August 2011 following a review by Leo Varadkar, then Minister for Transport, Tourism and Sport. This was confirmed on 10 November 2011.

In September 2015, it was announced that Metro North was being relaunched, with a revised opening date of 2027. In September 2021, government representatives indicated that the 2027 target would not be met and "was never likely to be achievable", with some reports projecting that construction would not commence before 2027. While included in the "National Development Plan 2021-2030", the plan included no completion dates for the proposed project.

=== Redesign as MetroLink ===
On 22 March 2018, the National Transport Authority announced revised proposals for the former Metro North line, now called MetroLink. The revised proposal included a new interchange at Glasnevin for planned DART+ West and South West services, an interchange with DART services at Tara Street, a single-bore tunnel instead of twin-bore tunnels, driverless operation and platform screen doors.

The initial 2018 proposal would have extended south from Charlemont to Sandyford and replaced part of the Luas Green Line with metro services. Following opposition to the potential closure of the Green Line during conversion, revised plans were published in March 2019, under which the first phase would run from Swords to Charlemont and the Green Line upgrade would be deferred.

Test drilling for boreholes began in December 2019. Engineering consultant SNC-Lavalin was appointed by Transport Infrastructure Ireland (TII) as operations adviser in March 2020. The Railway Order application was submitted in September 2022.

In May 2025, it was reported that tendering for construction work could commence in 2026, with works potentially beginning in 2028. Planning permission was granted in October 2025. The Railway Order became operational in January 2026. A judicial review challenge by Ranelagh residents was lodged in November 2025, but was withdrawn in December 2025 following mediation.

In June 2026, Transport Minister Darragh O’Brien suggested there was potential to open the line in stages "starting north of Swords, into Dublin city centre". A phased approach was previously discussed as a way to manage costs and logistical complexity.

The project website suggests that development could take six to eight years to complete once the necessary Railway Order and government business case approvals are in place and construction commences. Speaking to the Sunday Independent in June 2026, Transport Minister Darragh O'Brien reportedly "vowed" that the project would "break ground next August [2027]" and that construction could potentially commence in 2028.

=== Procurement ===
In July 2025, Transport Infrastructure Ireland began to discuss contracts with potential bidders. Three major contract groupings were identified: the northern civil works package, the southern civil works package including tunnelling, and a design, build, finance, operate and maintain package covering rolling stock, stations, railway systems, operations and maintenance.

In September 2025, a consortium of companies comprising Alstom, John Laing, FCC Group, Meridiam and RATP Group announced that they would bid for contracts.

In November 2025, the Irish government approved a policy proposal to establish a dedicated statutory delivery body for MetroLink, to operate under the aegis of the Minister for Transport and take responsibility for delivering the project. Later that month, TII invited tenders for a Programme Delivery Partner support-services contract, intended to support procurement and delivery of the project for approximately 12 years.

In February 2026, the bidding process began for the M401 and M402 design-and-build civil works contracts, valued at €4.6 billion and €3.3 billion respectively. M401 covers the southern section from Charlemont to Northwood, while M402 covers the northern section from Northwood to Estuary.

In May 2026, TII launched procurement for the €7.3 billion M500 Design, Build, Finance, Operate and Maintain contract, covering rolling stock, signalling, trackwork, station fit-out, railway systems, depot, operations control centre, park-and-ride provision and 25 years of operation and maintenance.

The site of the former Carlton Cinema was procured by TII in July 2026, for use as the O'Connell Street station.

== Infrastructure ==
MetroLink is planned as a fully segregated and automated metro railway approximately 18.8 km (11.7 mi) long. The railway is planned to include 16 stations, two bored tunnel sections, retained-cut and cut-and-cover structures, surface sections, two major elevated structures, a park-and-ride facility at Estuary and a maintenance depot at Dardistown.

MetroLink is planned to operate at Grade of Automation 4 (GoA4), allowing unattended train operation. The signalling system is planned to use communications-based train control (CBTC).

The Dardistown depot is planned as the main maintenance and stabling facility for MetroLink rolling stock. It is also planned as the main location for overnight train stabling. The depot is planned to include 15 parallel tracks designed to stable a fleet of 40 trains. An 800 m (2,600 ft) test track is also planned for rolling stock and systems testing.

=== Route and tunnels ===
The route includes two separate bored tunnel sections: a 2.3 km (1.4 mi) airport tunnel beneath Dublin Airport and a 9.4 km (5.8 mi) city tunnel from Northwood to south of Charlemont. Both tunnels are planned as single-bore, twin track tunnels, with an internal diameter of 8.5 m (28 ft). Additional evacuation and intervention tunnels are planned at Dublin Airport, south of Charlemont and Albert College Park. The line is planned to use twin tracks using slab track throughout.

North of Dublin Airport, the line is proposed to run in a mixture of surface, retained-cut, cut-and-cover and U-section structures. Surface sections are planned mainly north of the airport and around the M50 crossing, while shallow excavated sections are used along much of the R132 corridor and around Dardistown. Major elevated structures include a 261 m (856 ft) viaduct over the Broadmeadow and Ward rivers and a 99 m (325 ft) bridge over the M50.

=== Station design ===
The design concept for MetroLink stations was developed by Grimshaw Architects and applied by IDOM. The line is planned to have one surface station at Estuary, four retained-cut stations at Seatown, Swords Central, Fosterstown and Dardistown; and 11 underground stations at Dublin Airport, Northwood, Ballymun, Collins Avenue, Griffith Park, Glasnevin, Mater, O'Connell Street, Tara, St Stephen's Green and Charlemont. All platforms are planned to be approximately 65 m (213 ft) long. Full-height platform screen doors are planned along the complete length of the platforms.

=== Rolling stock ===
MetroLink plans to use high-floor trains approximately 64 m (210 ft) long and up to 2.65 m (8.7 ft) wide, running on standard gauge track. Each train is expected to carry up to 500 passengers, for up to 20,000 passengers per hour per direction. MetroLink project documents propose that the trains, of which there could be up to 40, would have 12 double doors on each side of a three-car train, with a design and operating speed of 80 km/h (50 mph).

=== Electrification ===
MetroLink is planned as a fully electrified railway using 1,500 V DC traction power. Electrical power is planned to be supplied from the national grid by two 110 kV AC high-voltage connections, at Dublin Airport North Portal and Dardistown depot.

Open sections of the route are to use overhead lines, while tunnels and the depot are generally to use rigid overhead conductor rails. The nominal contact wire height is planned at 4.5 m (15 ft).

== Operations ==
MetroLink is planned to operate a single line between Estuary and Charlemont. The operational design speed is 80 km/h (50 mph). The operating day is expected to run from 05:30 to 00:30 every day. MetroLink is expected to serve up to 53 million passengers annually.

MetroLink is planned to have gate-free station access with smartcard validators used for fare collection.

== Cost ==
Initially, the National Transport Authority projected that the project would cost €3 billion. In March 2021, the Minister for Public Expenditure and Reform, Michael McGrath, reportedly "warned that existing budgets may not cover" the full costs of MetroLink and related projects. In July 2022, the project was estimated to cost €9.5 billion, with an upper range estimate of €23 billion. In May 2025, MetroLink programme director Sean Sweeney indicated that the 2021 estimate of €7–12 billion was "going to change". In November 2025, the government approved €2 billion from the Infrastructure, Climate and Nature Fund to support MetroLink construction over the 2026–2030 period. In July 2026, The Irish Times reported that the cabinet could be expected to approve a preliminary budget of up to €19bn, while a "final Government decision on whether to authorise the metro project is not expected until tenders have been received". In September 2026, the cabinet approved a budget of up to €17.5bn.

== Further potential plans ==
=== Metro South ===
In 2006, Eamon Ryan, then transport spokesperson for the Green Party, called for the underground section of Metro North to be extended south to Beechwood, where it would surface and provide a direct link to the Luas Green Line. The Luas Green Line, largely built on the former Harcourt Street railway line alignment, was designed to allow metro trains to potentially operate on the line.

In the National Transport Authority's Transport Strategy for the Greater Dublin Area 2016–2035, it was proposed that the Metro North tunnel should be extended southwards to meet the Luas Green Line in the Ranelagh area, with the Green Line converted to metro operation. Revised plans released in March 2019 deferred the Green Line upgrade until after the northern MetroLink section became operational.

=== Metro South West ===
In 2020, it was reported that the NTA was assessing additional potential metro provision, including a southwest line serving Terenure, Rathfarnham and Knocklyon, or a southeastern line serving University College Dublin.

== Former plans ==
=== Metro West ===
Metro West was proposed to run from an intersection with Metro North, just south of the airport at Santry, and from there pass through Blanchardstown, Liffey Valley, and Clondalkin before joining the Luas Red Line to continue towards Tallaght. Metro West was planned to be entirely above ground at grade, and 25.5 km (15.8 mi) long. Planning on the Metro West Project was suspended in September 2011 following a review by Leo Varadkar, then Minister for Transport, Tourism and Sport, as funds to construct the new railway would not be available in the foreseeable future.

Two potential routes for Metro West had been published by the Railway Procurement Agency in January 2007. A preferred route was announced in July 2007. On 11 November 2008, the RPA chose their preferred route for Metro West, including indicative stops, depot and Park and Ride locations. The preferred route for Metro West ran from Tallaght to Metro North at Dardistown, via Clondalkin, Liffey Valley and Blanchardstown. The planned route would interchange with (from south to north) the Luas Red Line, Kildare Railway Line, Luas Line F (to Lucan), Maynooth Railway Line and Metro North Line, as well as local bus services.

Metro West was proposed to serve the northern parts of Finglas via stops at the N2 and Meakstown. When developing options for Metro West, the Railway Procurement Agency (RPA) considered routes south of the M50, serving Finglas more directly. Ultimately, these routes were not deemed feasible.

By 2016, Metro West had been excluded from the National Transport Authority's "Transport Strategy For The Greater Dublin Area 2016-2035". As of 2018, Metro West was not due to be considered for government funding until after 2035.

== See also ==
- Rail transport in Ireland
- List of metro systems in Europe
- List of metro systems
