= Suncroft =

County Kildare, Ireland

Suncroft Crochta na Gréine
- Village
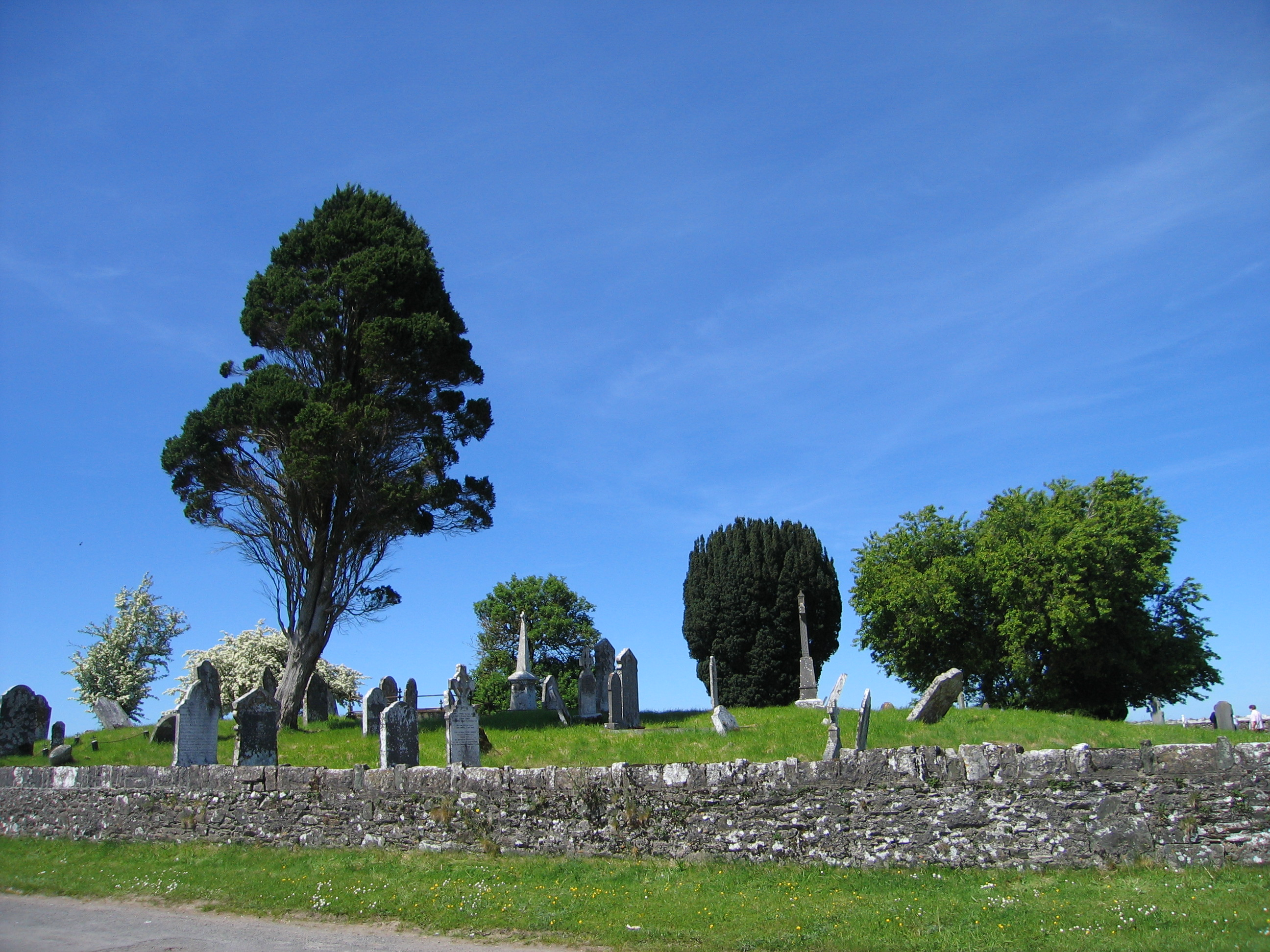
- Old graveyard in Suncroft

- Location in Ireland
- Coordinates: 53°06′28″N 6°51′40″W
- Country: Ireland
- Province: Leinster
- County: County Kildare

Population (2022)
  - Total: 491
- Time zone: UTC+0 (WET)
  - Summer (DST): UTC-1 (IST (WEST))
- Irish Grid Reference: N761071

Historical population
Year	Pop.	±%
1981	571	—
1986	513	−10.2%
1991	520	+1.4%
1996	490	−5.8%
2002	498	+1.6%
2006	607	+21.9%
2011	735	+21.1%
2016	746	+1.5%
2022	491	−34.2%

Suncroft (Irish: Crochta na Gréine) is a village in County Kildare, Ireland, south of The Curragh and east of Kildare Town. As of the 2022 census, Suncroft had a population of 491.

== Name ==
The name Suncroft is a translation of the Irish name Crochta na Gréine which means "a sun-blessed croft". According to local folklore, Suncroft was named by a priest who was walking in the croft (or field), and the sun was shining so brightly on the field that he decided to name the place Suncroft.

== Education ==
The primary school in the town is Suncroft National School (in Irish Scoil Bhride, Crochta na Gréine).

== Transport ==
Bus Éireann route 126 serves the village once a day in each direction (not Sundays) providing a link to/from Kildare, Newbridge, Naas and Dublin. The nearest railway stations are Kildare railway station and Newbridge railway station.

== Sport ==
Suncroft A.F.C. is the local football club, and Suncroft GAA is the local Gaelic Athletic Association club.

== See also ==
- List of towns and villages in Ireland
