= Curragh Racecourse =

Horse racing venue in the Republic of Ireland

The Curragh
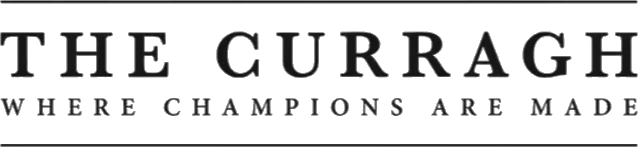

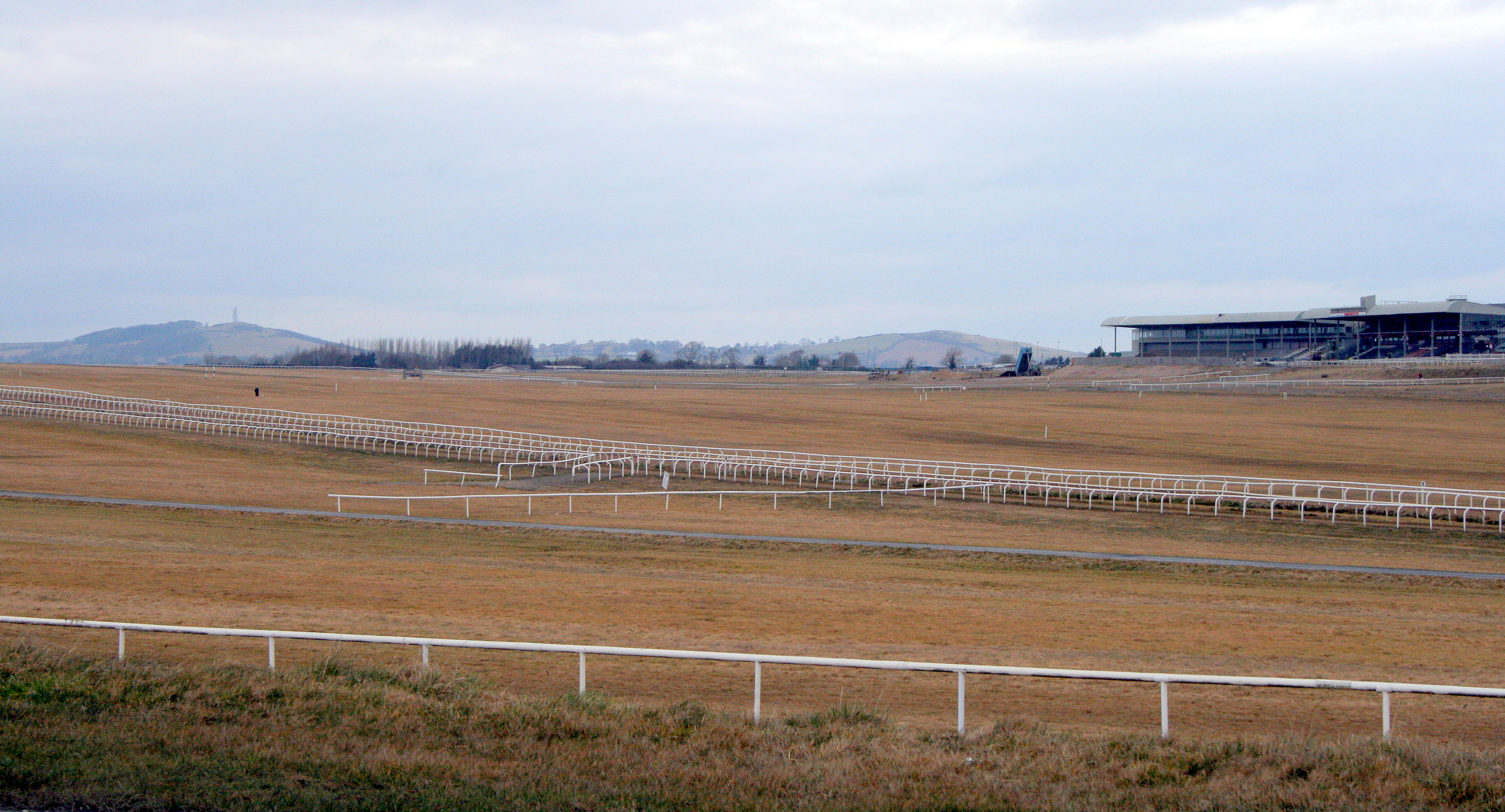
- The Curragh Racecourse in March 2010
- Interactive map of The Curragh
- Location: The Curragh County Kildare, County Kildare, Ireland
- Coordinates: 53°9′55″N 6°50′43″W
- Race type: Thoroughbred Flat
- Notable races: Irish 1,000 Guineas (G1); Irish 2,000 Guineas (G1); Irish Derby (G1); Irish Oaks (G1); Irish St. Leger (G1); Tattersalls Gold Cup (Gr1); Phoenix Stakes (Gr1); Pretty Polly Stakes (Gr1); Moyglare Stud Stakes (Gr1); Vincent O’Brien National Stakes (Gr1); Flying Five Stakes (Gr1)

The Curragh Racecourse is a flat racecourse in County Kildare, Ireland. The racecourse is home to Ireland’s five most important flat races, known as the Classics. Racing takes place 23 days each year from the end of March until late October. Guided tours of the venue are available outside of race days.

== History ==
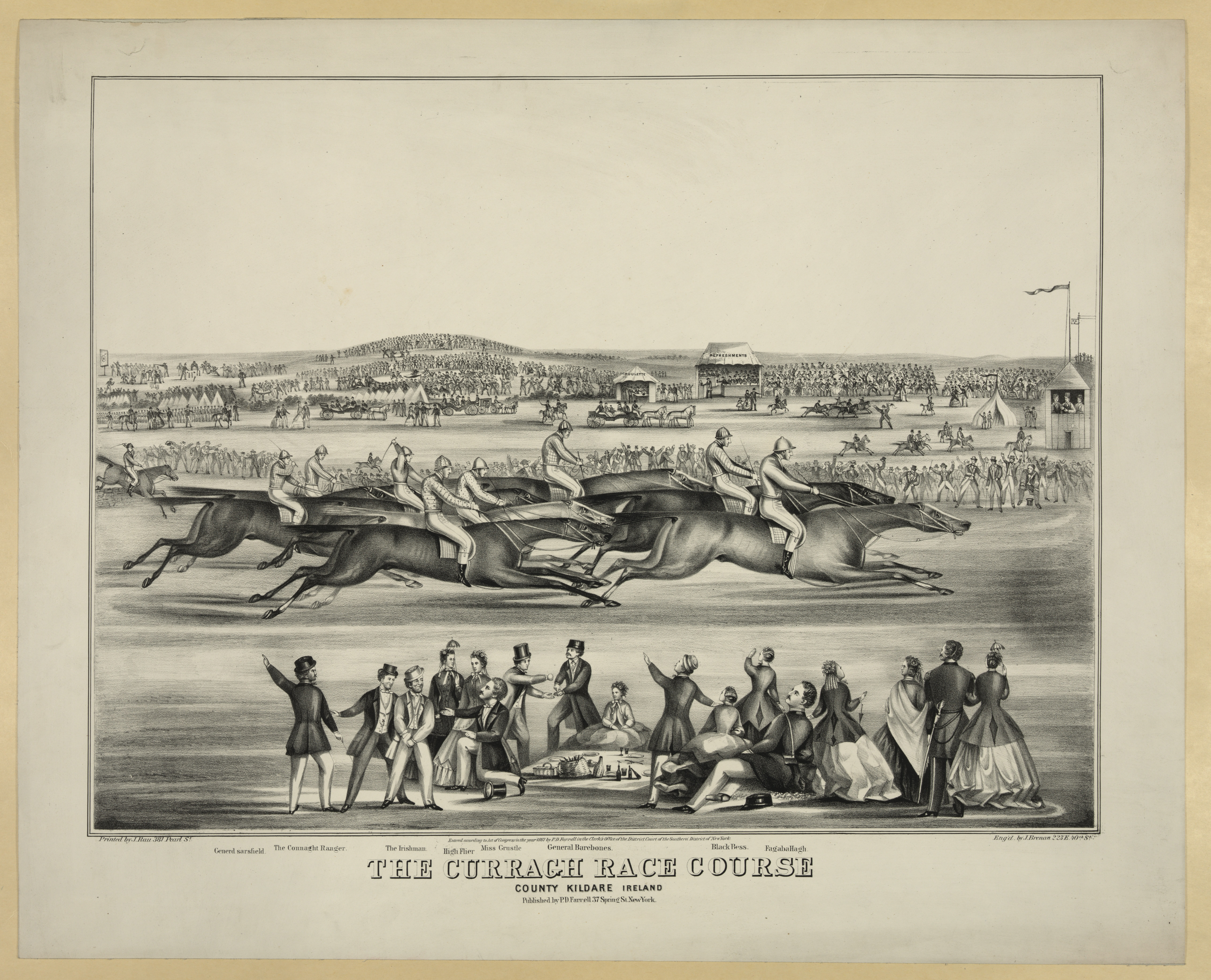
"The Curragh race course", a 19th-century print

The name "Curragh" comes from the Irish language word Cuirreach, meaning "place of the running horse". The first recorded race on the plain took place in 1727, but it was used for races before then. The first Derby was held in 1866, and in 1868 the Curragh was officially declared a horse racing and training facility by act of parliament.

== Racecourse redevelopment ==
Redevelopment of the Curragh grandstand and racecourse facilities began in 2017 with completion due in time for commencement of the 2019 Irish Flat season. A truncated racing fixture list continued to be held at the course during this period with temporary facilities in place for the public.

== Racing ==
The Curragh is a right-handed track, horseshoe and galloping in nature with a testing uphill finish. The track spans two miles in distance with a one-mile chute. It is home to all five Irish Flat Classics.

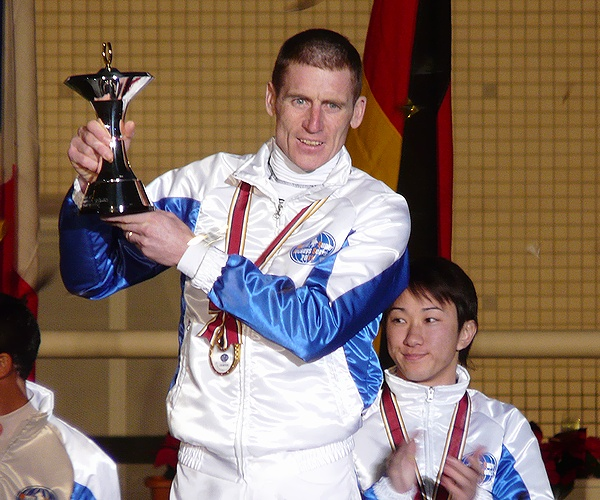
Johnny Murtagh has had more than 300 wins at the Curragh.

Top jockey	Wins	Rides	%
Johnny Murtagh	330	1,943	17
Mick Kinane	327	1,968	17
Kevin Manning	256	2,600	10
Pat Smullen	238	2,275	10
Christy Roche	160	891	18

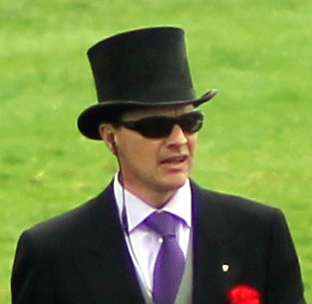
Trainer A. P. O'Brien has had more than 600 wins at the course.

Top trainer	Wins	Runs	%
A. P. O'Brien	609	3,262	19
J. S. Bolger	391	3,558	11
D. K. Weld	340	3,203	11
John M. Oxx	330	2,321	14
Kevin Predergast	196	2,361	8

== Training grounds ==
The Curragh training grounds provide trainers with the opportunity to prepare their horses on approximately 1,500 acres of training facilities. In addition to 70 miles of turf gallops, there are approximately 12 miles of peat gallops and eight all-weather tracks available to work on. The Curragh refurbished and resurfaced all of the all-weather gallops between 2020 and 2021. The Old Vic woodchip gallop over 9-furlongs on the Curragh is Ireland’s most popular all-weather gallop and a proven test of a racehorse.

== Previous champion horses ==
Numerous elite level racehorses have run at the course prior to becoming multiple Group One winners around the world. Due to the fair nature of the track, the course has a reputation for attracting high quality two-year old runners in particular, with many making their first racecourse appearances at the Curragh.

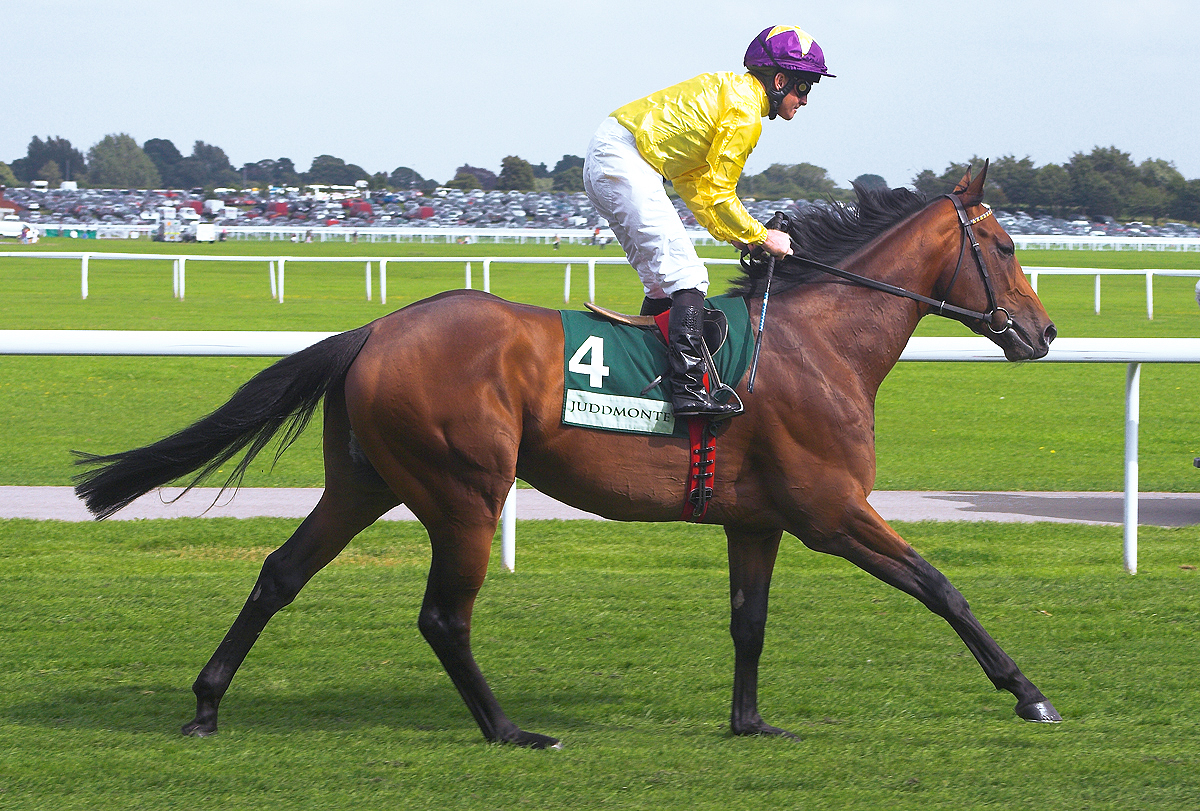
2009 World Champion Sea The Stars trained on the Curragh by John Oxx

Horse	Trainer	Jockey	Race Won	Year
Ballymoss	M. V. O'Brien	T. P. Burns	Irish Derby	1957
Meadow Court	P. J Prendergast	L. Piggott	Irish Derby	1965
Sir Ivor	M. V. O'Brien	L. Ward	National Stakes	1967
Nijinsky	M. V. O'Brien	L. Ward	Irish Derby	1970
Roberto	M. V. O'Brien	J. Roe	National Stakes	1971
The Minstrel	M. V. O'Brien	L. Piggott	Irish Derby	1977
Alleged	M. V. O'Brien	L. Piggott	Royal Whip Stakes	1977 & 1978
Storm Bird	M. V. O'Brien	T. Murphy	National Stakes	1980
Shergar	M. Stoute	L. Piggott	Irish Derby	1981
El Gran Senor	M. V. O'Brien	P. Eddery	National Stakes / Irish Derby	1983/1984
Sadler's Wells	M. V. O'Brien	G. McGrath	Irish 2,000 Guineas	1984
Vintage Crop	D. K. Weld	M. J. Kinane	Irish St Leger	1993/1994
Salsabil	J. Dunlop	W. Carson	Irish Derby	1990
Rodrigo De Triano	P. Chapple Hyam	J. Reid	Irish 2,000 Guineas	1992
St Jovite	J. Bolger	C. Roche	Irish Derby	1992
Ridgewood Pearl	John Oxx	J. P. Murtagh	Irish 1,000 Guineas	1995
Kayf Tara	Saeed Bin Suroor	Frankie Dettori	Irish St Leger	1998/1999
Montjeu	J. Hammond	Cash Asmussen	Irish Derby	1999
Sinndar	John Oxx	J. P. Murtagh	National Stakes / Irish Derby	1999/2000
Hawk Wing	A. P. O'Brien	M. J. Kinane	National Stakes	2001
Galileo	A. P. O'Brien	M. J. Kinane	Irish Derby	2001
Vinnie Roe	D. K. Weld	P. J. Smullen	Irish St Leger	2001/2002/2003/2004
High Chapparal	A. P. O'Brien	M. J. Kinane	Irish Derby	2002
Rock of Gibraltar	A. P. O'Brien	M. J. Kinane	Irish 2,000 Guineas	2002
Attraction	Mark Johnston	Kevin Darley	Irish 1,000 Guineas	2004
Ouija Board	Ed Dunlop	L. Dettori	Irish Oaks	2004
Dubawi	Saeed Bin Suroor	L. Dettori	National Stakes	2004
George Washington	A. P. O'Brien	Kieren Fallon	National Stakes	2005
Hurricane Run	Andre Fabre	Kieren Fallon	Irish Derby	2005
Teofilo	J. S. Bolger	Kevin Manning	National Stakes	2006
Dylan Thomas	A. P. O'Brien	Kieren Fallon	Irish Derby	2006
New Approach	J. S. Bolger	Kevin Manning	National Stakes	2007
Yeats	A. P. O'Brien	Kieren Fallon	Irish St Leger	2007
Halfway To Heaven	A. P. O'Brien	Seamus Heffernan	Irish 1,000 Guineas	2008
Camelot	A. P. O'Brien	J. P. O'Brien	Irish Derby	2012
Australia	A. P. O'Brien	J. P. O'Brien	Irish Derby	2014
Kingman	J. Gosden	James Doyle	Irish 2,000 Guineas	2014
Minding	A. P. O'Brien	Seamus Heffernan	Moyglare Stud Stakes	2015
Winter	A. P. O'Brien	Ryan Moore	Irish 1,000 Guineas	2017
Enable	J. Gosden	L. Dettori	Irish Oaks	2017
Alpha Centauri	Jessica Harrington	Colm O'Donoghue	Irish 1,000 Guineas	2018

== Notable races ==
Month	DOW	Race Name	Type	Grade	Distance	Age/Sex
March	Sunday	Park Express Stakes	Flat	Group 3	1m	3yo + f
April	Sunday	Gladness Stakes	Flat	Group 3	7f	3yo +
May	Monday	Athasi Stakes	Flat	Group 3	7f	3yo +
May	Monday	Mooresbridge Stakes	Flat	Group 3	1m 2f	4yo +
May	Monday	Tetrarch Stakes	Flat	Listed	7f	3yo only
May	Saturday	Ridgewood Pearl Stakes	Flat	Group 3	1m	4yo + f
May	Saturday	Irish 2,000 Guineas	Flat	Group 1	1m	3yo only
May	Saturday	Greenlands Stakes	Flat	Group 3	6f	3yo +
May	Sunday	Irish 1,000 Guineas	Flat	Group 1	1m	3yo only f
May	Sunday	Gallinule Stakes	Flat	Group 3	1m 2f	3yo only
May	Sunday	Tattersalls Gold Cup	Flat	Group 1	1m 2f 110y	4yo +
June	Friday	International Stakes	Flat	Group 3	1m 2f	3yo +
June	Saturday	Irish Derby	Flat	Group 1	1m 4f	3yo only
June	Saturday	Railway Stakes	Flat	Group 2	6f	2yo only
June	Saturday	Sapphire Stakes	Flat	Group 3	5f	3yo +
June	Sunday	Curragh Cup	Flat	Group 3	1m 6f	3yo +
June	Sunday	Pretty Polly Stakes	Flat	Group 1	1m 2f	3yo + f
June	Sunday	Balanchine Stakes	Flat	Group 3	6f	2yo only f
July	Saturday	Anglesey Stakes	Flat	Group 3	6f 63y	2yo only
July	Saturday	Minstrel Stakes	Flat	Group 3	7f	3yo +
July	Saturday	Irish Oaks	Flat	Group 1	1m 4f	3yo only f
July	Sunday	Kilboy Estate Stakes	Flat	Group 2	1m 1f	3yo + f
August	Sunday	Phoenix Sprint Stakes	Flat	Group 3	6f	3yo +
August	Sunday	Phoenix Stakes	Flat	Group 1	6f	2yo only
August	Sunday	Debutante Stakes	Flat	Group 2	7f	2yo only
August	Sunday	Royal Whip Stakes	Flat	Group 3	1m 2f	3yo +
August	Saturday	Futurity Stakes	Flat	Group 2	7f	2yo only
August	Saturday	Flying Five Stakes	Flat	Group 3	5f	3yo +
August	Saturday	Curragh Stakes	Flat	Listed	5f	2yo only
August	Saturday	Irish St Leger Trial Stakes	Flat	Group 3	1m 6f	3yo +
September	Sunday	Moyglare Stud Stakes	Flat	Group 1	7f	2yo only f
September	Sunday	Lanwades Stud Fillies' Stakes	Flat	Group 3	1m 1f	3yo + f
September	Sunday	Round Tower Stakes	Flat	Group 3	6f	2yo only
September	Saturday	Renaissance Stakes	Flat	Group 3	6f	3yo +
September	Saturday	Blandford Stakes	Flat	Group 2	1m 2f	3yo + f
September	Sunday	Vincent O'Brien Stakes	Flat	Group 1	7f	2yo only
September	Sunday	Solonaway Stakes	Flat	Group 2	1m	3yo +
September	Sunday	Irish St. Leger	Flat	Group 1	1m 6f	3yo +
September	Sunday	Weld Park Stakes	Flat	Group 3	7f	2yo only f
September	Sunday	Beresford Stakes	Flat	Group 2	1m	2yo only

== Transport ==
=== Bus ===
On race days, there are free shuttle buses from Kildare railway station and the town square and from Newbridge town railway station and Main Street to The Curragh. Expressway also operates services from Dublin City centre to the racecourse on major race days.

=== Former railway stations ===
The racecourse was once served by two railway stations: Curragh Mainline on the main Dublin–Cork line, which opened in 1846, and Curragh Racecourse at the end of a short branch to the grandstand, which opened in 1875. Curragh Racecourse station closed in 1977 and the branch was subsequently lifted, while Curragh Mainline fell into disuse in the early 2000s.
