= O'Moore Park =

Stadium in Portlaoise, County Laois, Ireland

- Irish: Páirc Uí Mhórdha
- Interactive map of O'Moore Park
- Location: Portlaoise, County Laois, R32 CRF3, Ireland
- Coordinates: 53°1′34″N 7°18′8″W
- Public transit: Portlaoise railway station
- Owner: Laois GAA
- Capacity: 22,000 (6,500 seated)
- Field size: 142 x 86 m

Construction
- Renovated: 2002

O'Moore Park (Irish: Páirc Uí Mhórdha) is a GAA stadium in Portlaoise, County Laois, Ireland. It is the home of the Laois Gaelic football and hurling teams. Under a new sponsorship deal it is known as "Laois Hire O'Moore Park".

Although it may have been in use as a GAA ground since 1888, and was acquired by Maryborough GAA Club in 1908, it was not purchased as the county grounds until 1917, becoming then one of the first grounds acquired by a county board (just six years after the purchase of Croke Park).

The spectator capacity is about 22,000, of which 6,500 can be seated. Its pitch is one of Ireland's best under weather. It is the venue for many club and county matches, particularly since the installation of floodlights. It is frequently used as a neutral stadium for inter-county matches not involving Laois. The ground is located 0.5 km from Portlaoise town centre on the N80 road (Abbeyleix road).

In the stand, white seats against a background of blue seats are used to spell out "Laois Laois".

== Naming rights ==
Period	Sponsor	Name
2019-2022	MW Hire Group	MW Hire O'Moore Park
2023-	Laois Hire	Laois Hire O’Moore Park

== See also ==
- List of Gaelic Athletic Association stadiums
- List of stadiums in Ireland by capacity
