= Tullamore railway station =

Railway station in Ireland

Tullamore Tulach Mhór
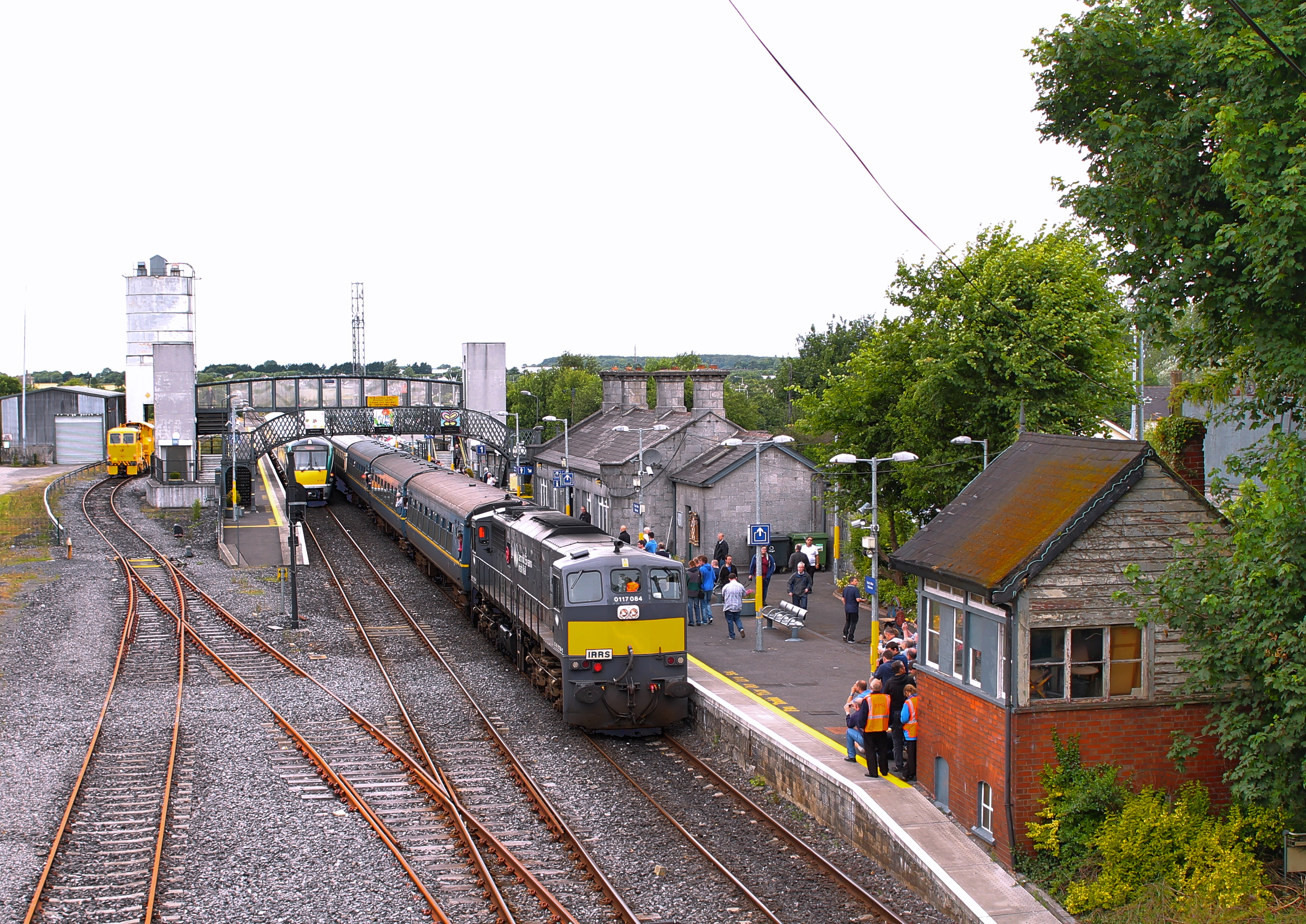

General information
- Location: Kilcruttin, Tullamore; County Offaly, R35 RY63; Ireland
- Coordinates: 53°16′13″N 7°29′59″W
- Owner: Iarnród Éireann
- Operator: Iarnród Éireann
- Platforms: 2
- Tracks: 3
- Bus operators: Buggy Coaches; Kearns Transport; Slieve Bloom Coach Tours; TFI Local Link
- Connections: 815; 835; 837; 840; 843; 845; 847; UM02

Construction
- Structure type: At-grade
- Cycle facilities: 5 long-term storage lockers
- Accessible: Yes, with accessible toilet

Other information
- Station code: TMORE
- Fare zone: H

Key dates
- 1854: Station opened

Passengers
- 457,708
- Iarnród Éireann; CIÉ; IÉ railway stations
Route map
Location

Tullamore railway station serves the town of Tullamore in County Offaly, Ireland.

The station lies on the Dublin to Galway and Dublin to Westport or Ballina line.

There are 17 direct trains to Dublin Heuston per weekday with the first departure at 05:45 and the final departure at 22:33.

There are 15 trains to Athlone per weekday with the first leaving at 06:50 and the final departure at 21:34. 13 of these 15 trains offer direct and indirect services to Galway Ceannt while 5 offer direct and indirect services to Westport."²"

== History ==
The station first opened in Tullamore on 2 October 1854.

Branch Line Origins:

Tullamore forms part of the Portarlington to Athlone railway and for much of its existence the railway operated as a branch line.

Passenger services from Tullamore were paltry compared to today and Clara Railway Station, with its two spur lines to Banagher and Streamstown, would have been considered more important due to it being a terminus station for these services.

In 1882 there were 3 daily return trains a day from Tullamore with one return service on a Sunday. There were no direct journeys past either Portarlington or Athlone. And the passenger station in Athlone was on the Roscommon side of the town with the current station on the Westmeath side being a goods station.

A trip from Dublin Heuston (then Kingsbridge Station) to Tullamore took approx. three hours (page 342 of the 1882 Bradshaw's Guide).

By 1910 the service had been reduced to two daily return trains per weekday and there was no service on Sundays. However, the journey times had improved to 1 hour 57 minutes and there was now a direct service to Dublin Heuston (still called Kingsbridge at the time). The service still terminated in Athlone. (Page 705 of the 1920 Bradshaw's Guide)

Tullamore's Growing Importance:

By 1971, the railway line was operating under the stewartship of CIE. While the Portarlington to Athlone line was still a branch line, Tullamore had now assumed more importance than Clara Railway Station and there were 4 daily services per day that terminated in Athlone with two on Sunday.

In the opposite direction, there were 3 trains to Dublin Heuston during weekdays with 2 on Sundays. Trips between Dublin Heuston and Tullamore now took as little as 1 hour and 23 minutes.

Putting Tullamore's 1970s Service Patterns In A National Context:

For historical context, the 7 train services per day that served Tullamore respresented almost 7.5% of all of Ireland's entire daily train services. There were 94 daily trains per day in 1972 according to a CIE report. In 2025, the numbers of daily trains on the Irish Rail network is approaching 900.

In terms of passenger numbers, there were 10.3m per year in Ireland in the year 1971, as extrapolated from the same CIE Report mentioned in the paragraph above. In 2024 there were 50.7m.

Mainline Promotion:

By 1975 CIE had upgraded the Portarlington to Athlone line to be the mainline to Galway. This came with an increase in frequency and a decrease in journey times.

There were now 6 weekday trains per day to Athlone with 4 going directly on to Galway. On Sundays there were 3 services to Athlone. Athlone's current station would become the only passenger station in the town by 1985.

In the opposite direction, there were 5 weekday trains to Dublin Heuston with 2 on Sundays. The fastest train between Tullamore and Heuston was reduced to 1 hour and 11 minutes.

== Present Day ==
In 2025, there are 32 weekday trains that serve Tullamore with the fastest journey between Heuston and Tullamore taking 47 minutes.

In 2024, Tullamore Railway Station, with 457,708 passengers, accounted for almost 1 per cent of the total number of Irish Rail passengers per year (50.7m).

With lengths of 186 and 185 metres respectively, platform 1 and 2 can accommodate 22000 consists of up to 8 railcars in length.

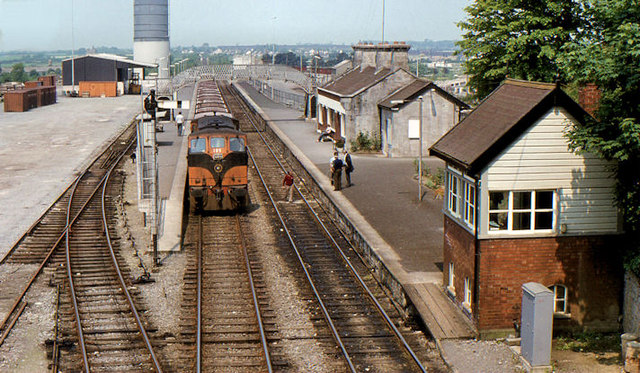
Tullamore station in 1982.

== Awards ==
- 2004 - 2nd Prize - Intercity Stations Category
- 2003 - 2nd Prize - Intercity Stations Category
- 2002 - Best Overall Station
- 2002 - 1st Prize - Intercity Stations Category
- 1999 - 3rd Prize - Intercity Stations Category
- 1997 - Most Improved - InterCity Stations Category

== Services ==
Preceding station	Iarnród Éireann	Following station
Portarlington	InterCity; Dublin–Westport/Galway railway line	Clara
Portarlington	InterCity; Ballina branch line	Clara

== See also ==
- List of railway stations in Ireland
