= Monasterevin railway station =

Station in County Kildare, Ireland

Coordinates: 53.1386°N 7.0608°W

Monasterevin Mainistir Eimhín
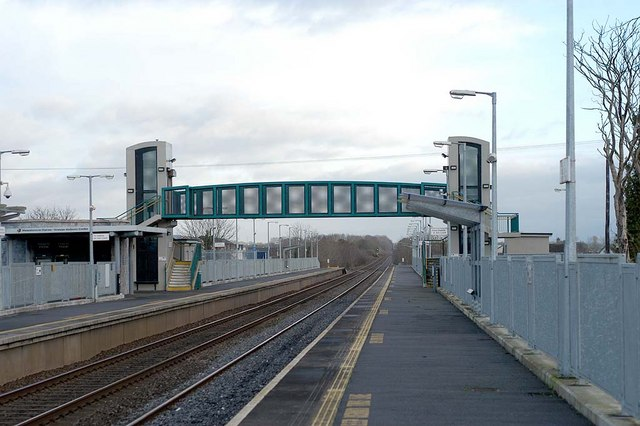
- Monasterevin station

General information
- Location: Canal Harbour, Monasterevin; County Kildare, W34 KX61; Ireland
- Owner: Iarnród Éireann
- Operator: Iarnród Éireann
- Platforms: 2
- Tracks: 2
- Bus operators: TFI Local Link
- Connections: 806; 888

Construction
- Structure type: At-grade

Other information
- Station code: MONVN
- Fare zone: F

History
- Original company: Great Southern and Western Railway
- Pre-grouping: Great Southern and Western Railway
- Post-grouping: Great Southern Railways

Key dates
- 1847: Original station opened
- 1976: Original station closed
- 2001: Station reopened
Location

Monasterevin (Mainistir Eimhín in Irish) (also Monasterevan) railway station is on the Dublin to Cork InterCity railway line. It is served mostly by commuter services to and from Heuston Station, Dublin. Until December 2017, there were no services on Sundays.

It is situated just outside the town of Monasterevin, County Kildare.

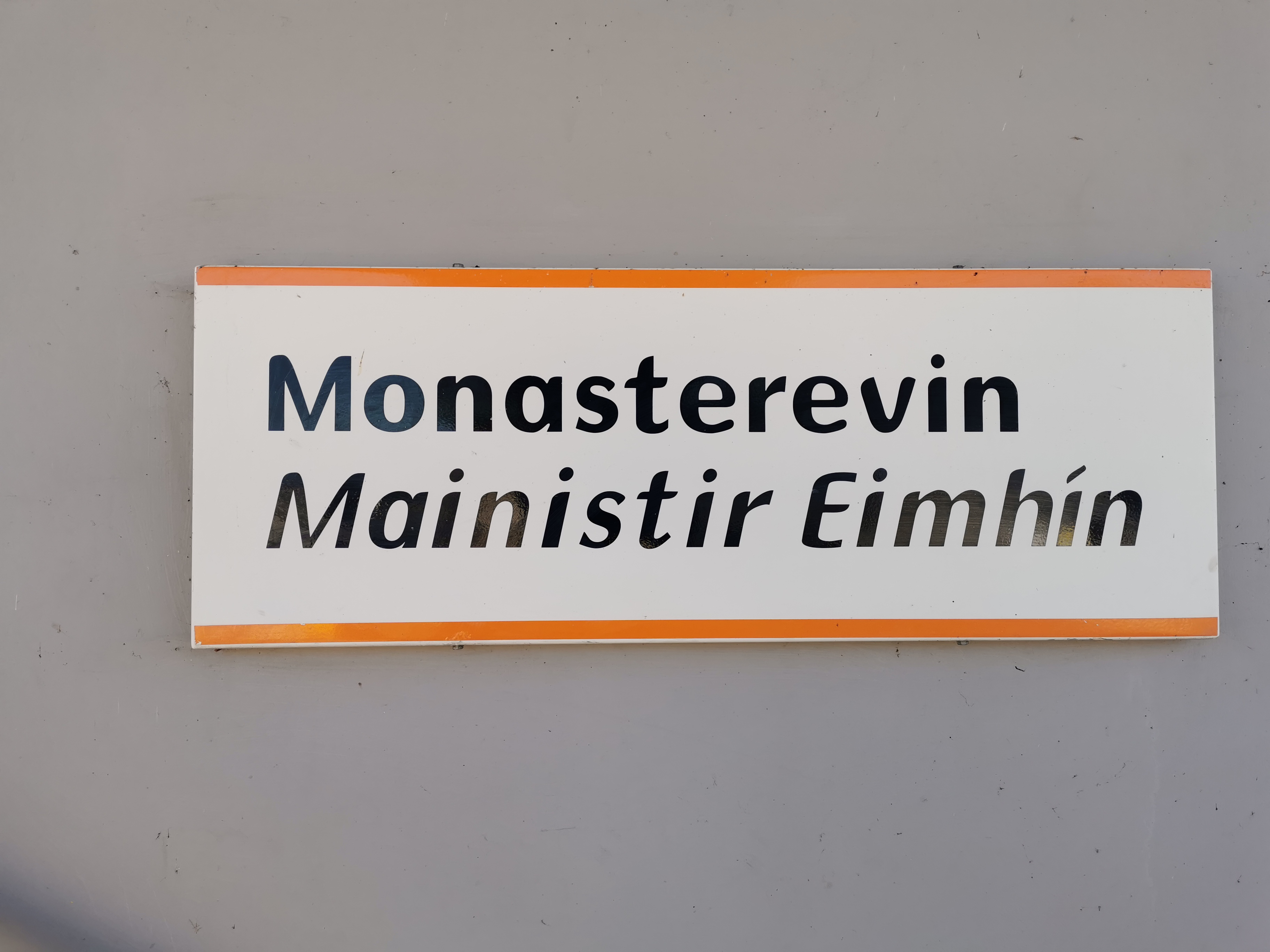
Monasterevin's unique sign, showing the station's names in both Gaeilge and English. It is the only set of signs in the country to be aligned to the left.

== Services ==
Preceding station	Iarnród Éireann	Following station
Kildare	InterCity; Dublin-Westport/Galway railway line	Portarlington
Kildare	Commuter; South Western Commuter	Portarlington

== See also ==
- List of railway stations in Ireland
