= Kildare railway station =

Railway station in Ireland

Kildare Cill Dara
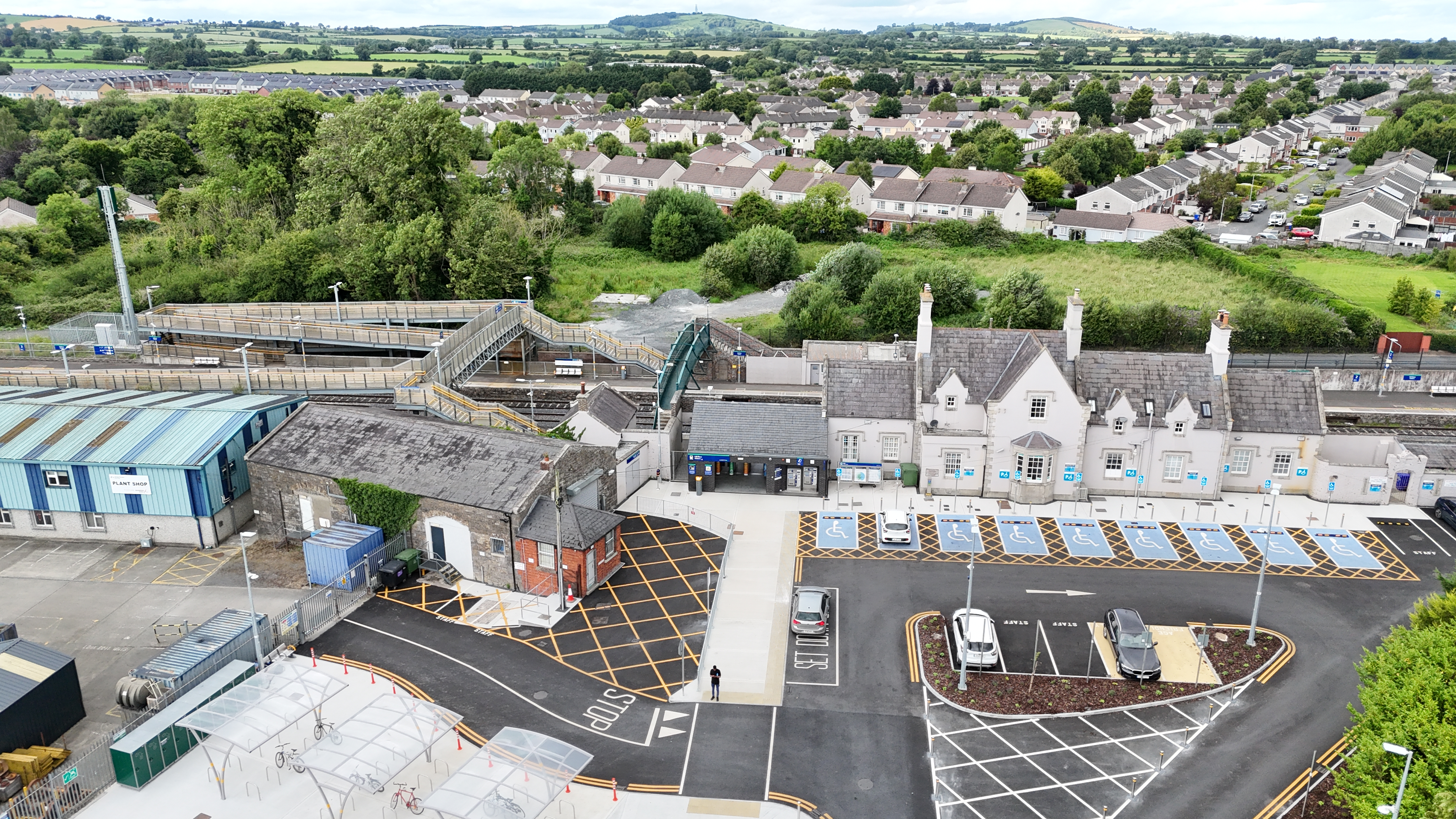

General information
- Location: Station Road, Kildare; County Kildare, R51 AW63; Ireland
- Coordinates: 53.162802°N 6.908111°W
- Owner: Iarnród Éireann
- Operator: Iarnród Éireann
- Platforms: 2
- Bus operators: TFI Local Link
- Connections: 883

Construction
- Structure type: At-grade

Other information
- Station code: KDARE
- Fare zone: 4

History
- Opened: 1846
Location

Kildare railway station is a railway station in Kildare along the Dublin to Cork main line, and is served by Dublin commuter services as well as intercity services from Dublin Heuston to Limerick, Galway, Westport, Waterford, and Tralee. The station is located at the 30 mile (48km) point from Dublin Heuston.

It has three tracks, one for through services and two platforms. As the first major station on the south- and west-bound line from Heuston station, it is served, or at least passed-through, by a large number of trains. It is also used by timber trains and container trains travelling between Waterford and County Mayo to run round.

Kildare is also home to a number of On Track Machines (OTM's) housed at the maintenance depot adjacent to the station. These are used for ballast cleaning, track tamping and other railway maintenance and infrastructure works. These OTM's are operated by the Rhomberg Sersa Rail Group on behalf of Irish Rail under contract, with the company's Irish operations based in Kildare.

== History ==
The station opened on 4 August 1846 and was closed for goods traffic on 6 September 1976.

Kildare was the terminus station for the Arrow commuter service up until 2003. Due to Kildare having 3 tracks (1 platform loop on the up-line), it was the perfect terminus as it would not disrupt InterCity trains passing through. IÉ 2600 Class trains were regularly seen at Kildare before the Southwestern Commuter service was introduced and was extended to Portlaoise in 2013. Now, the station mainly sees IÉ 22000 Class and CAF Mark 4 trains on InterCity and Commuter services.

On 28 April 2025, the Leap Card area was extended to Kildare. This brought Kildare under Zone 4 of the Dublin Commuter Zone. Kildare is the last station on the Dublin-Cork Mainline where passengers can use this method of payment. Customers can use their Leap Cards to pay for their journeys by tapping-on and off and this allows for easier connections on Luas and Dublin Bus.

In June of 2025, Irish Rail completed upgrade works to the stations car park. This work resulted in an improved road entrance prioritising pedestrians, a bus bay, new lighting, increased CCTV, new bike parking facilities, and a 22% increase in car parking facilities.

== Bus links ==
Passengers can also connect at the station to a shuttle bus service to Kildare Village shopping outlet. On days of racing there is a shuttle bus to Curragh Racecourse. South Kildare Community Transport also serve the station providing links to Milltown, Nurney and Kildangan.

The railway station is a short 10 minute walk from the town centre where passengers can connect onto Dublin Coach services or Go Ahead Ireland services to Rathangan or the Curragh.

== Services ==
Kildare is a unique station whereby it is serviced by many InterCity and Commuter trains. Due to it being the last station before the Waterford Line splits at Cherryville Junction, almost all Waterford or Carlow bound trains call at Kildare.

The station is used by freight trains from Ballina to run-round and continue to Waterford. This is done every weekday, except Thursday. The track layout at Kildare allows freight trains to stop on the up line, switch onto the passing loop at platform 2, then continue down the line to reverse up and continue down onto Cherryville Junction.

Services from Kildare begin at 05:54 (Mon-Sat) and 08:04 on Sundays. The last through train calls at 23:03 (Mon-Sat) and 21:38 on Sundays. The final Monday-Saturday Southwestern Commuter Service from Heuston Station departs at 23:10 and terminates in Kildare at midnight.

Preceding station	Iarnród Éireann	Following station
Dublin Heuston	InterCity; Mallow–Tralee line (Sundays only)	Portarlington
Newbridge	InterCity; Dublin–Cork railway line	Monasterevin
Newbridge	InterCity; Dublin–Westport/Galway railway line	Monasterevin
Newbridge	InterCity; Dublin-Waterford railway line	Athy
Newbridge	Commuter; South Western Commuter	Monasterevin or Terminus

== Facilities ==
Kildare has 2 sheltered waiting areas, one on each platform. There are toilet facilities on Platform 1. In May 2026, the digital departure boards and customer information screens were improved, there are 1 on each platform.

There are no lifts at the station. However, passengers can use a ramp to access the bridge to cross the railway.

The ticket office is open from 05:45-00:00 Monday to Saturday and 09:30-22:30 on Sunday.

== Gallery ==
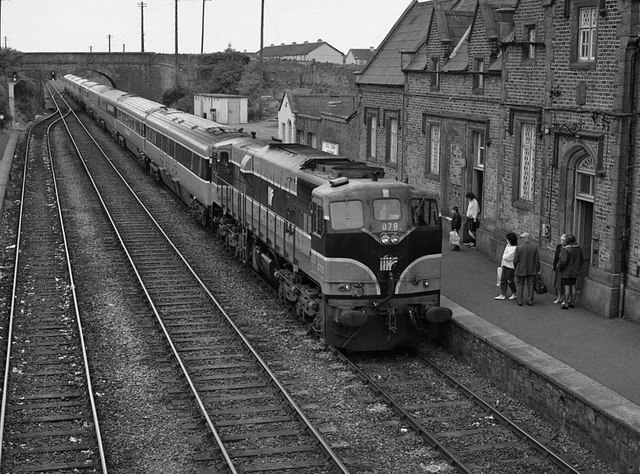
An IE 071 class locomotive brings Mk3 coaching stock into Kildare station forming the 14.05 Dublin - Cork passenger service.18 September 1988

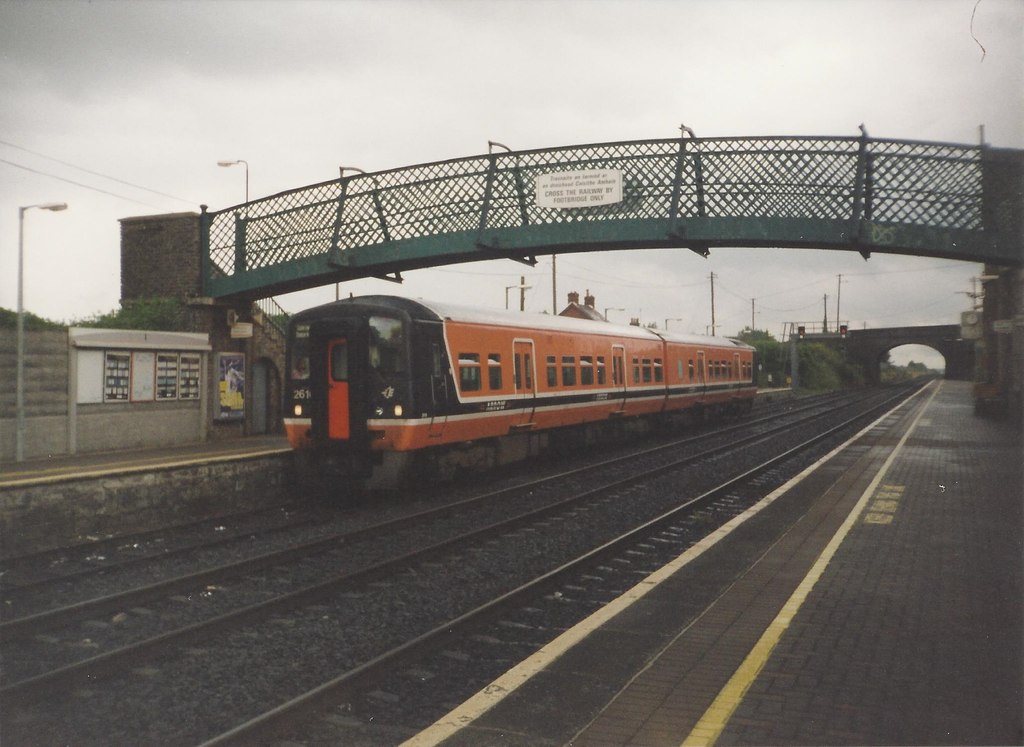
Stopping train to Dublin, Kildare station 9 June 1997

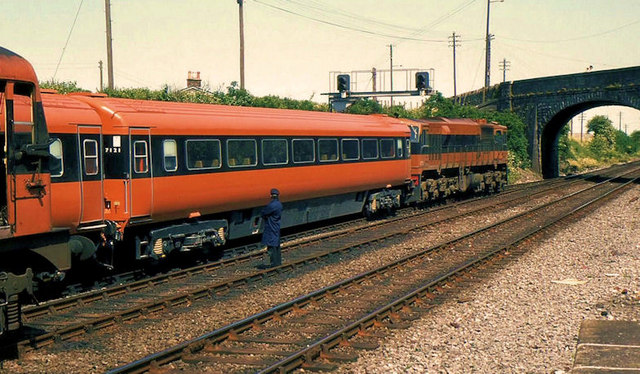
A test train is calling at the up platform as a light engine (left) waits on the up main line.28 May 1984

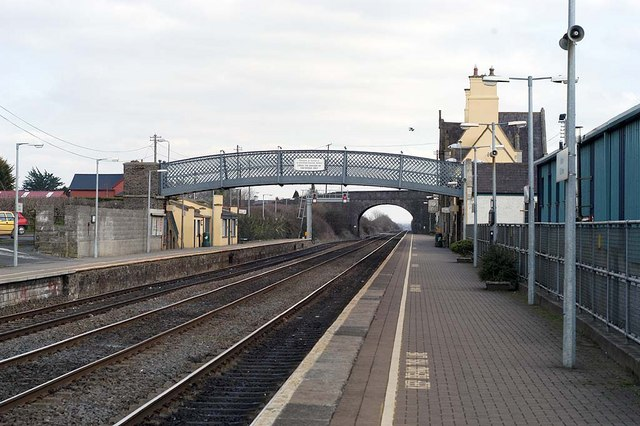
Kildare railway station on the Dublin to Cork mainline looking towards Dublin.22 March 2006

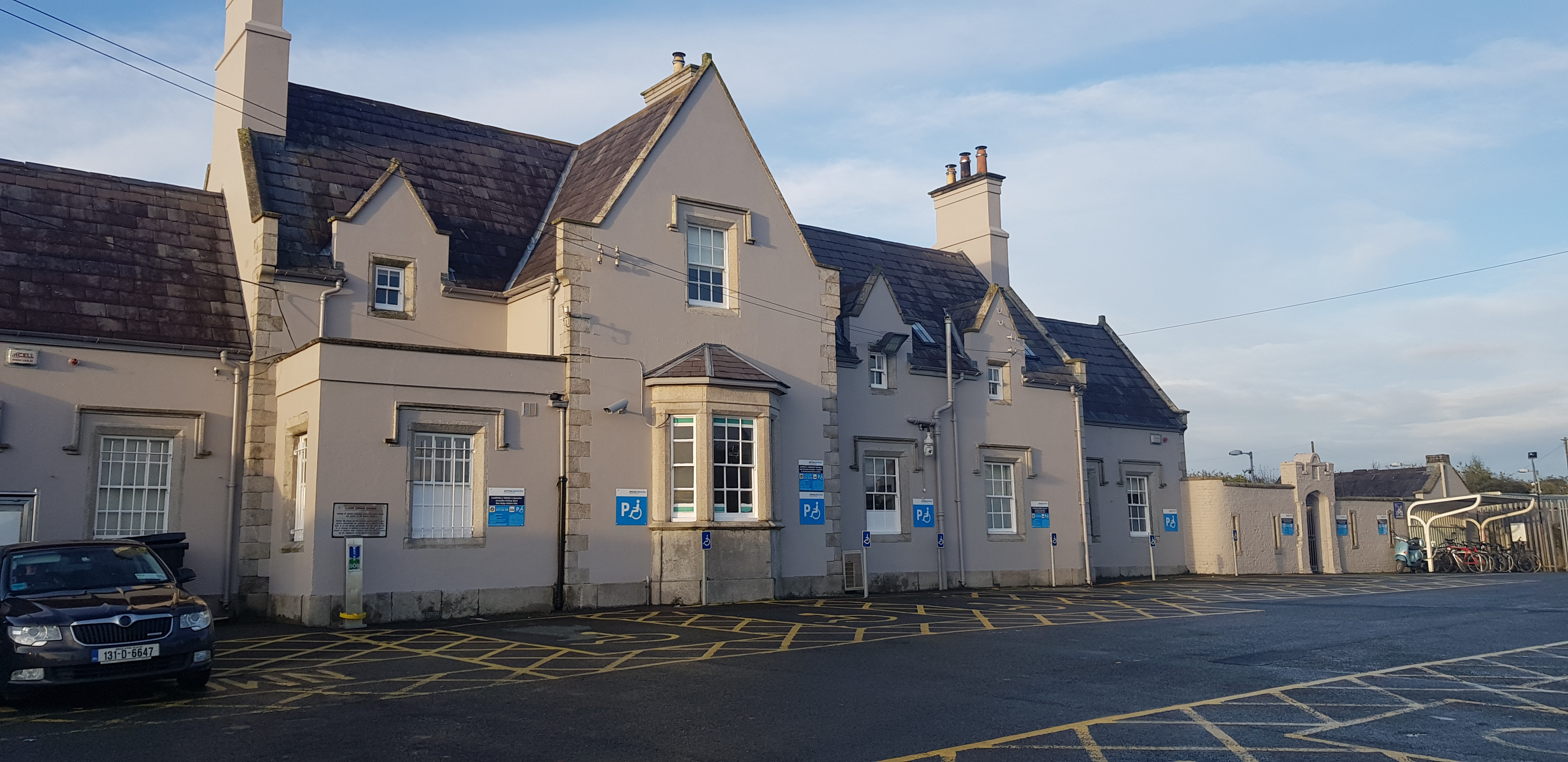
Outside view of Kildare railway station

== See also ==
- List of railway stations in Ireland
