= Sallins and Naas railway station =

Station in County Kildare, Ireland

Sallins and Naas Na Solláin agus An Nás
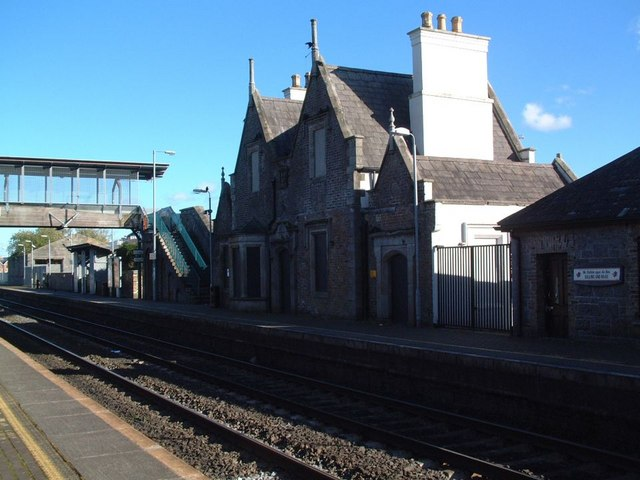

General information
- Location: Sallins, County Kildare, W91 XY28; Ireland
- Coordinates: 53°14′49″N 6°39′53″W
- Owner: Iarnród Éireann
- Operator: Iarnród Éireann
- Platforms: 2
- Tracks: 2
- Bus operators: JJ Kavanagh and Sons; TFI Local Link
- Connections: 139; 821; 885; 895

Construction
- Structure type: At-grade

Other information
- Station code: SALNS
- Fare zone: 2

History
- Original company: Great Southern and Western Railway
- Pre-grouping: Great Southern and Western Railway
- Post-grouping: Great Southern Railways

Key dates
- 1846: Original station opened
- 9 June 1947: Closed to goods
- 1963: Original station fully closed
- 31 March 1976: Sallins Train Robbery
- 1994: Relocated station opens
Location

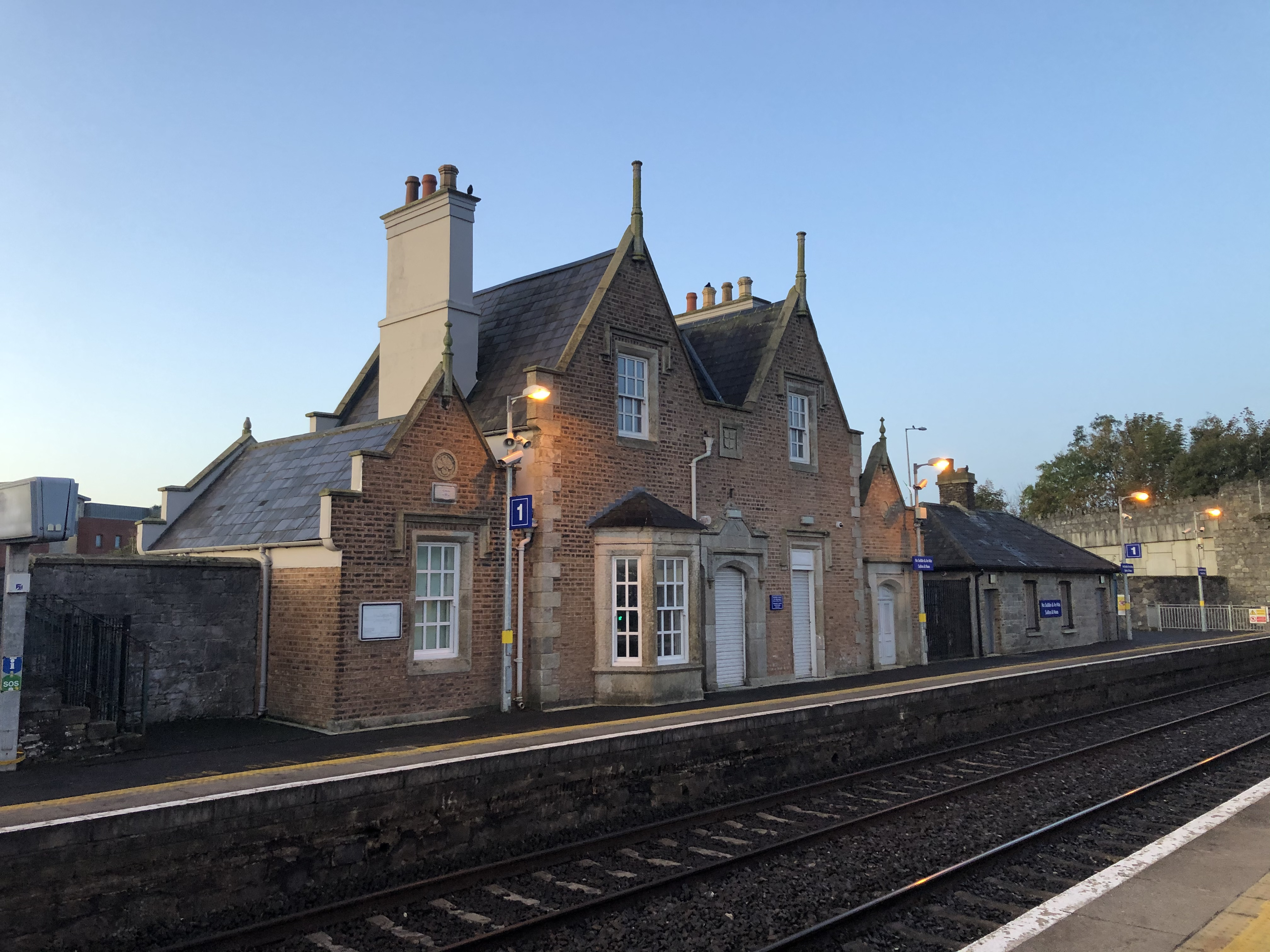
Sallins and Naas railway station building built in the 1840s

Sallins and Naas railway station is located in the centre of the village of Sallins, County Kildare and also serves Naas, 3 km (2 miles) away.

== Feeder bus ==
A feeder bus operates between the station and the centre of Naas (Poplar Square & Post Office). There are several journeys in each direction throughout the day. The bus does not operate on Sundays.

== History ==
Originally called "Sallins", it opened on 4 August 1846 and was the junction for the Tullow branch, which included the original Naas station. It closed in 1963, and was renamed Sallins & Naas upon re-opening in 1994.

== Services ==
Preceding station	Iarnród Éireann	Following station
Hazelhatch & Celbridge	InterCity; Dublin–Westport/Galway railway line Peak times only	Newbridge
Hazelhatch & Celbridge	Commuter; South Western Commuter	Newbridge

== See also ==
- List of railway stations in Ireland
