= Portarlington railway station =

Railway station in Ireland

Portarlington Cúil an tSúdaire
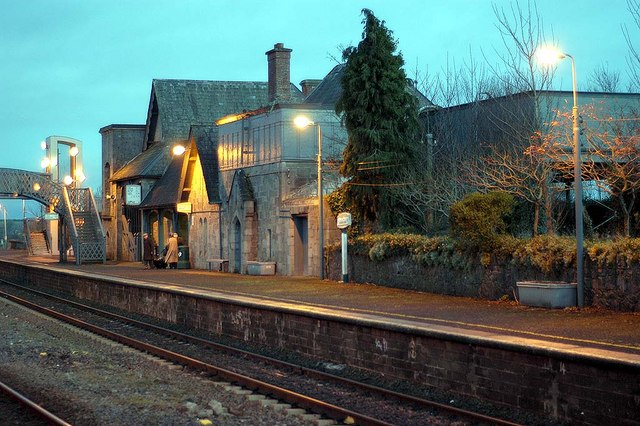
- Portarlington Station

General information
- Location: Station Road, Portarlington; County Laois, R32 PK66; Ireland
- Coordinates: 53°08′46″N 7°10′54″W
- Owner: Iarnród Éireann
- Operator: Iarnród Éireann
- Platforms: 2
- Bus operators: Slieve Bloom Coach Tours; TFI Local Link
- Connections: 806; 827; 829

Construction
- Structure type: At-grade

Other information
- Station code: PTRTN
- Fare zone: F

History
- Opened: 1847
Location

Portarlington station is a railway station on the Dublin-Cork Main Line.

It is the branching-off/exchange point for services to Galway, Ballina, and Westport. The Galway/Mayo line diverges at the west end of the station via a single lead junction towards Athlone.

The station is situated just outside Portarlington, County Laois, Ireland.

The station formerly had a third track between the platforms "the centre or middle road" which was removed in 2005 when the platforms were lengthened and widened in preparation for the introduction of Mk 4 Inter City trains.

== History ==
The station opened on 26 June 1847.

== Services ==
=== Train Services ===
Preceding station	Iarnród Éireann	Following station
Kildare	InterCity; Mallow-Tralee railway line (Sundays only)	Portlaoise
Kildare	InterCity; Dublin–Westport/Galway railway line	Tullamore
Kildare	InterCity; Ballina branch line	Tullamore
Monasterevin	Commuter; South Western Commuter	Portlaoise

== See also ==
- List of railway stations in Ireland
