= Sersa Group =

Swiss railway company

- Industry: Railway
- Founded: 1948 (Sersa)
- Founder: Arnold Schnyder
- Key people: Konrad Schnyder
- Services: Track construction and maintenance and machinery leasing
- Number of employees: >1000 (c.2012)
- Website: www.sersa-group.com

Sersa Group is a Swiss railway construction and maintenance company.

It was established by Arnold Schnyder in 1948. The company has long operated as supplier of equipment and services for track construction and renewals activities. Sersa Group has also directly undertaken the construction of new railway lines and other such projects. Based in Neuchâtel, Sersa Group grow from working on Zurich's rail network to providing track maintenance services across the entire Swiss rail system, as well as spreading internationally.

Into the twenty-first century, growth of the company has been augmented via acquisitions, such as the Canadian firm Total Track and Universale-Bau. During September 2012, the merger of Sersa Group with the Austrian business Rhomberg Rail Holding Group of Austria to form Rhomberg Sersa Rail Holdings. It has continued to grow via strategic partnerships, setting up joint ventures with companies such as Vossloh and Amey, and the acquisition of various subsidiaries, such as from the British business Balfour Beatty.

== History ==
Sersa (Soudage électrique des rails S.A.) was founded in 1948 in Neuchâtel by Arnold Schnyder as a trackside railway maintenance company, it initially operated on the rail lines around Zurich, Switzerland. Arnold Schnyder's son Konrad took over the company and expanded the business to cover track infrastructure work throughout Switzerland, as well as establishing numerous subsidiaries abroad.

Sersa Group has also expanded through multiple acquisitions. During December 2009, the company bought a 68% stake in the Canadian track construction and maintenance company Total Track. In July 2013, the Universale-Bau track and construction business of the insolvent Alpine group was purchased. In January 2015, it became the sole owner of Sersa Total Track Ltd after purchasing the outstanding shares from Tim Mann.

During September 2012, it was announced that Sersa Group would merge with Rhomberg Rail Holding Group of Austria, to form Swiss-based international rail technology company Rhomberg Sersa Rail Holdings; at the time, the combined business employed near 1,600 personnel worldwide and generated revenues of roughly $450 million annually.

During late 2014, Sersa Group acquired several rail infrastructure activities in mainland Europe that had been formerly owned by the British-based infrastructure company Balfour Beatty. In the mid 2010s, it created a joint venture with the British infrastructure support specialist Amey.

In September 2018, Vossloh and the Rhomberg Sersa Rail Group were establishing a joint venture to cooperate on matters pertaining to infrastructure competence.

During October 2021, Balfour Beatty announced that it was selling its U.S. track solutions operations to the Rhomberg Sersa Rail Group in exchange for $7.25 million; the division was subsequently rebranded as Rhomberg Sersa North America and made the company one of only a few European rail contractors to have a significant and permanent presence in the United States.

In April 2023, it was announced that Rhomberg Sersa Rail Group UK and Charles Brand Ltd had formed a new joint venture, Rhomberg Sersa Charles Brand JV, which will provide complementary civil engineering and permanent way services to the UK rail industry. That same month, Sersa Group reorganised and merged its Australian subsidiaries, RKR Engineering and Rhomberg Rail Australia, to create Rhomberg Sersa Australia.

== Operations ==
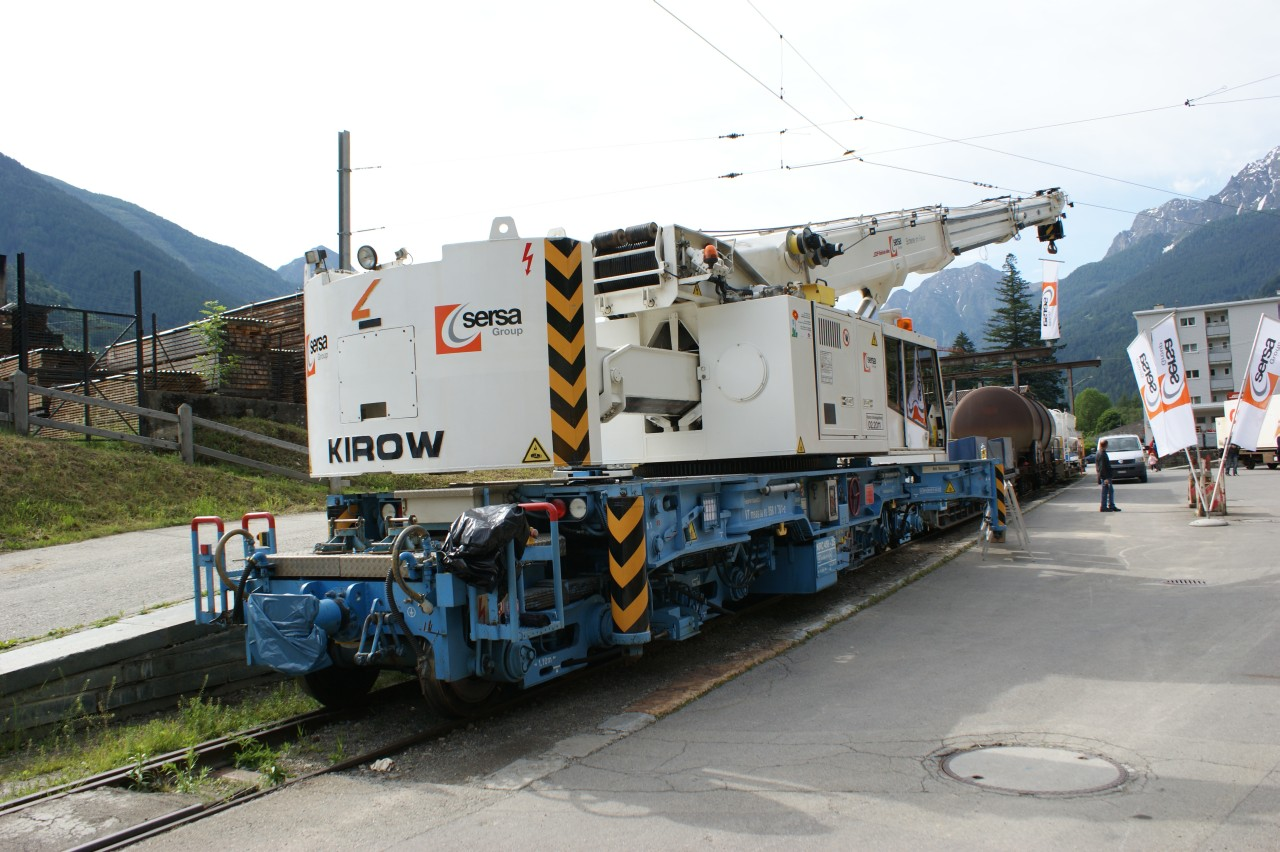
Sersa Kirow crane

The company supplies services relating to rail track construction and renewals; including ballasted and slab track construction, catenary construction, and project management. Maintenance of track including ballast cleaning and tamping, rail inspection, welding, grinding and milling, and operates and leases a variety of machinery such as tamping machines, cranes, grinding trains and ballast cleaning machines. On several occasions, Sersa Group has been appointed as the lead construction company for a project, including the building of new railway lines, such as parts of the Bergen Light Rail in Norway.

Over the decades, Sersa Group expanded internationally, setting up multiple subsidiaries overseas to operate in various countries, including the United Kingdom (Sersa (UK) Ltd.), and the Netherlands (Sersa BV).
