= Portlaoise railway station =

Station in Ireland

Portlaoise Port Laoise
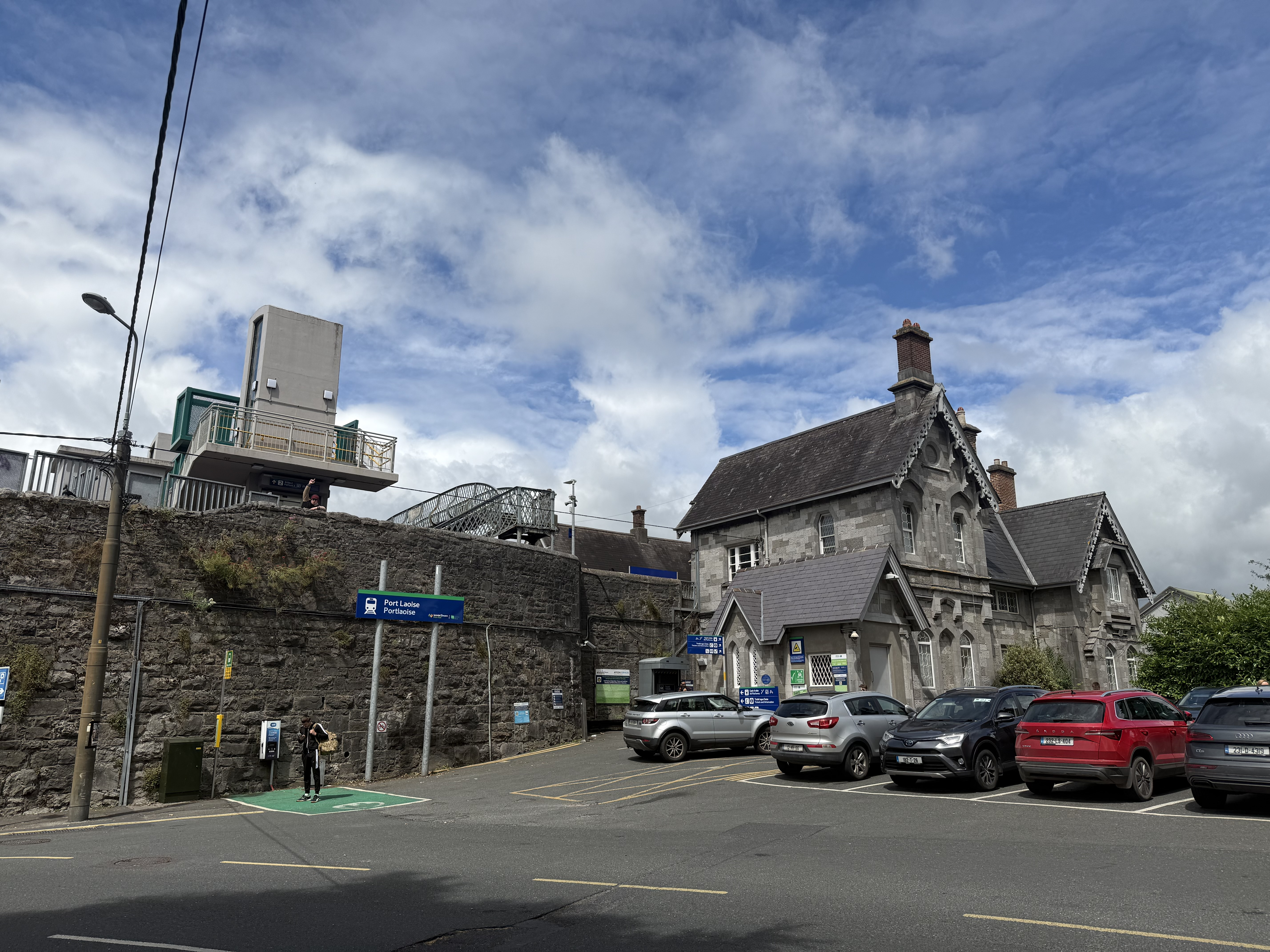
- Portlaoise Station

General information
- Location: Railway Street, Portlaoise; County Laois, R32 P590; Ireland
- Coordinates: 53°02′12″N 7°18′07″W
- Owner: Iarnród Éireann
- Operator: Iarnród Éireann
- Platforms: 2
- Bus operators: City Direct; Slieve Bloom Coach Tours; TFI Local Link
- Connections: 823; 827; 828; 829; 834; 838; 858; LS1; PL1; PL2

Construction
- Structure type: At-grade

Other information
- Station code: PTLSE
- Fare zone: G

History
- Opened: 1847
Location

Portlaoise railway station is a station on the Dublin to Cork/Limerick lines in Ireland. It is also the terminus for the South Western Commuter also called the Portlaoise Commuter Line which forms part of the Dublin Suburban Rail network in the commuter belt for Dublin. It is the busiest county town railway station in the midlands region with up to 32 trains to Dublin (10 Non-Stop) and 30 trains from Dublin (9 Non-Stop) per day.

It is situated in Portlaoise town centre, in County Laois.

== History ==
Portlaoise (formerly Maryborough) railway station opened on 26 June 1847. It was designed by Sancton Wood.

In March 2008, Irish Rail opened a new Traincare depot south-west of Portlaoise town centre (officially opened on 25 July 2008). The depot provides a high quality maintenance and servicing facility for the 183 intercity railcars and some facilities for outer suburban railcars serving the Dublin - Portlaoise route. Irish Rail also have their Permanent Way depot South of the station.

== Service ==
=== Train Services ===
Station services include but not limited to parking on both sides of station, coffee served daily from 5am by “bloom coffee box” accessibility aids and much more

Preceding station	Iarnród Éireann	Following station
Dublin Heuston or Portarlington	InterCity; Dublin-Cork railway line	Ballybrophy
Portarlington	Commuter; South Western Commuter	Terminus

=== Bus Services ===
TFI Local Link routes 828, 850, and 858 serve the station providing links to locations such as Thurles, Roscrea, Cashel, Urlingford, Durrow and Abbeyleix and in the other direction to the Midland Regional Hospital, Portlaoise. The bus stop is located just outside the station building on Station Road (accessed via stairs from Platform 1).

== See also ==
- List of railway stations in Ireland
