= Dunshaughlin railway station =

Proposed train station in Ireland

Dunshaughlin railway station is a proposed railway station intended to serve the town of Dunshaughlin in County Meath, Ireland. As of 2007, the proposed station was included in proposals for a redeveloped Dublin–Navan railway line. As of May 2026, Dunshaughlin was included in proposals for an extended DART line between Navan and the M3 Parkway railway station.

== Proposals ==
As of 2007, several options for a proposed station at Dunshaughlin were included in scoping studies relating to "phase 2" of the planned Dublin–Navan railway line development.

The preferred route for phase 2 of this extension was published in 2009. At that time, it was intended that, for the most part, the line would follow the disused route to Navan. However, there was debate over the location of Dunshauglin station. Iarnród Éireann favoured the existing route, which carries the railway line approximately 1.5 km to the west of the town, on the other side of the Dunshauglin interchange of the M3 motorway. Some County Meath Councillors expressed a preference that the route of the line should be "as close to Ratoath and Dunshaughlin as possible" and that "potential users should not have to cross the R147 and M3 to get to a train station".

While a station at Dunshauglin had been planned to be built as part of phase 2 of the reinstatement of the Clonsilla-Navan line, as of 2012, these plans were deferred due to the reduction in the Exchequer capital investment programme.

Dunshauglin had been intended to be the first station on the phase 2 section of the route, after the M3 Parkway park and ride station. The proposed route plans included 34 km of railway line, with stations at Dunshaughlin, Kilmessan, Navan town centre and a further station on the northern edge of Navan.

In 2016, the National Transport Authority ruled that there was not a sufficient number of commuters to warrant a new station, but agreed to conduct a new study; a report was due be released in mid-2021. County councillors made representations to "ensure that the 'actual' population of Dunshaughlin" would be used in the determination of the need for a station.

In May 2026, Dunshauglin (along with Navan and Kilmessan) was again included in a proposal to operate planned DART services on a reopened line between the M3 Parkway station and Navan.

Preceding station	Iarnród Éireann	Following station
	Proposed	
M3 Parkway	Commuter; Western Commuter (Dublin-Navan)	Kilmessan
