= Newbridge railway station (Ireland) =

Railway station in County Kildare, Ireland

Newbridge An Droichead Nua
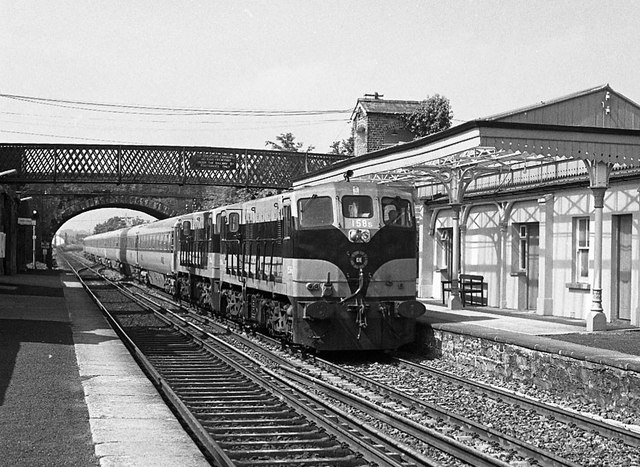
- Two CIÉ 141/181 class locomotives bring the 7:30 Westport–Dublin passenger train into Newbridge station in 1986

General information
- Location: Station Road, Newbridge; County Kildare, W12 CP28; Ireland
- Coordinates: 53.1853°N 6.8083°W
- Owner: Iarnród Éireann
- Operator: Iarnród Éireann
- Platforms: 3
- Bus operators: TFI Local Link
- Connections: 821; 883; 892

Construction
- Structure type: At-grade

Other information
- Station code: NBRGE
- Fare zone: 3

History
- Opened: 4 August 1846
Location

Newbridge railway station (Irish: An Droichead Nua) is a station on the Dublin to Cork railway line and Dublin Commuter Service. It serves the town of Newbridge in County Kildare, Ireland and lies approximately 4 kilometres (2.5 mi) from the Irish Army Curragh Camp.

== History ==
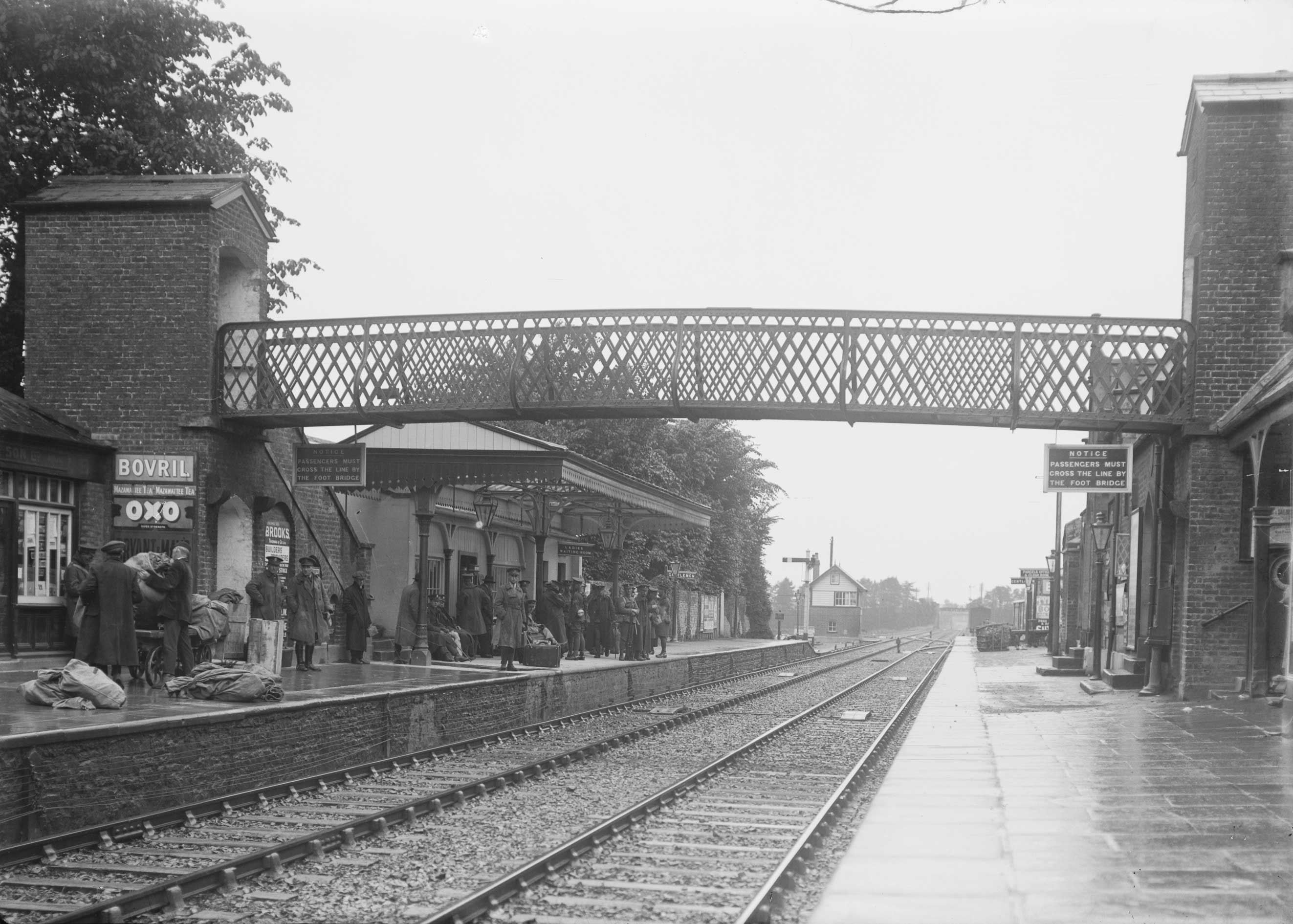
Soldiers waiting on the platform, c.1910

The station opened on 4 August 1846 and was closed for goods traffic on 6 September 1976.

== Services ==
=== Train Services ===
Preceding station	Iarnród Éireann	Following station
Dublin Heuston	InterCity; Dublin-Waterford Main Line	Kildare
Dublin Heuston	InterCity; Dublin-Westport/Galway railway line	Kildare
Sallins & Naas	Commuter; South Western Commuter	Kildare or Terminus

=== Bus Services ===
South Kildare Community Transport serve the station providing a link to Milltown.

== See also ==
- List of railway stations in Ireland
