= TFI Local Link =

Rural bus service in Ireland

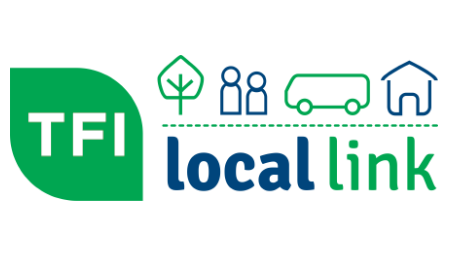
- Parent: Transport For Ireland
- Founded: 2002
- Service area: Republic of Ireland
- Service type: Bus & coach services
- Alliance: Bus Éireann
- Website: transportforireland.ie/tfi-local-link/

TFI Local Link, or simply Local Link, is a set of local bus services in the Republic of Ireland which provide local public transport in rural areas, typically linking villages to local towns. As well as scheduled services, Local Link provides bookable door-to-door services for those with reduced mobility. Since 2025, it has also operated a pilot demand-responsive transport scheme, branded as TFI Anseo, in a number of locations. Managed by Transport for Ireland (TFI), Local Link services are publicly subsidised.

== History ==
A 2002 pilot project "Rural Transport Initiative" was started to look into unaddressed transport needs, giving rise to a "Rural Transport Programme". Services were originally managed locally by voluntary groups. A 2013 restructuring of management reduced the large number of local groups to a number of "Transport Co-ordination Units" (subsequently branded as "Local Link offices"). Funding is from the government's Public Service Obligation via the National Transport Authority (NTA) under its Transport for Ireland (TFI) brand.

In February 2023, the Irish Government proposed a large expansion of Local Link services. 65 new or improved services were started in 2023, with a 36% increase in the number of passengers compared with the previous year.

In July 2025, TFI Local Link launched a pilot demand-responsive transport scheme, branded as "TFI Anseo", on Achill Island. The scheme uses a mobile app that passengers use to book buses between two locations in served zones, acting as a hybrid between a share taxi and a rideshare service. The pilot scheme was later expanded to Killarney and north-east Limerick City as part of the one year trial. Within four months, the service had reportedly moved 20,000 passengers in Killarney.

== Services ==
=== Bus services ===
TFI manages a number of timetabled bus services that are operated by local operators. As of 2021, there were 400 such local operators. Local Link's bus services are managed by several local offices. As of 2023, these offices covered:

- Donegal Sligo Leitrim
- Cavan Monaghan
- Mayo
- Galway
- Longford Westmeath Roscommon
- Louth Meath Fingal
- Laois Offaly
- Kildare & South Dublin
- Limerick Clare
- Tipperary
- Carlow Kilkenny Wicklow
- Kerry
- Cork
- Waterford
- Wexford

=== Demand-responsive service ===
A demand-responsive transport (DRT) scheme, "TFI Anseo" (lit. 'TFI Here'), was introduced on a pilot basis in 2025. It is part of the NTA's Rural Mobility Plan and funded by the Climate Action Fund.

The scheme launched initially on Achill Island in County Mayo on 15 July 2025, alongside a mobile app. TFI Anseo was later launched in Killarney, County Kerry on 11 August 2025 and north-east Limerick City on 13 October 2025. Each trial is 12 months long. More pilot areas are planned as the service, described as a "Smart DRT", expands.

Rather than running on a fixed route, TFI Anseo buses operate as a hybrid between a share taxi and a rideshare service. Buses are called via the app. Children under the age of nine go free, and Ireland's free travel pass is accepted.

The service is operated by regional Local Link operators, which are independent Transport Coordination Units (TCUs). TCUs running TFI Anseo services set their own bus fares. Killarney and Limerick currently use flat fares, while fares on Achill Island are distance-based due to the larger catchment area.

Within four months of operation (from 11 August 2025 to 19 December 2025), TFI reported that the service had moved 20,000 passengers in Killarney.
