= Parnell Park =

Irish stadium

- Páirc Parnell
- "The Neller"
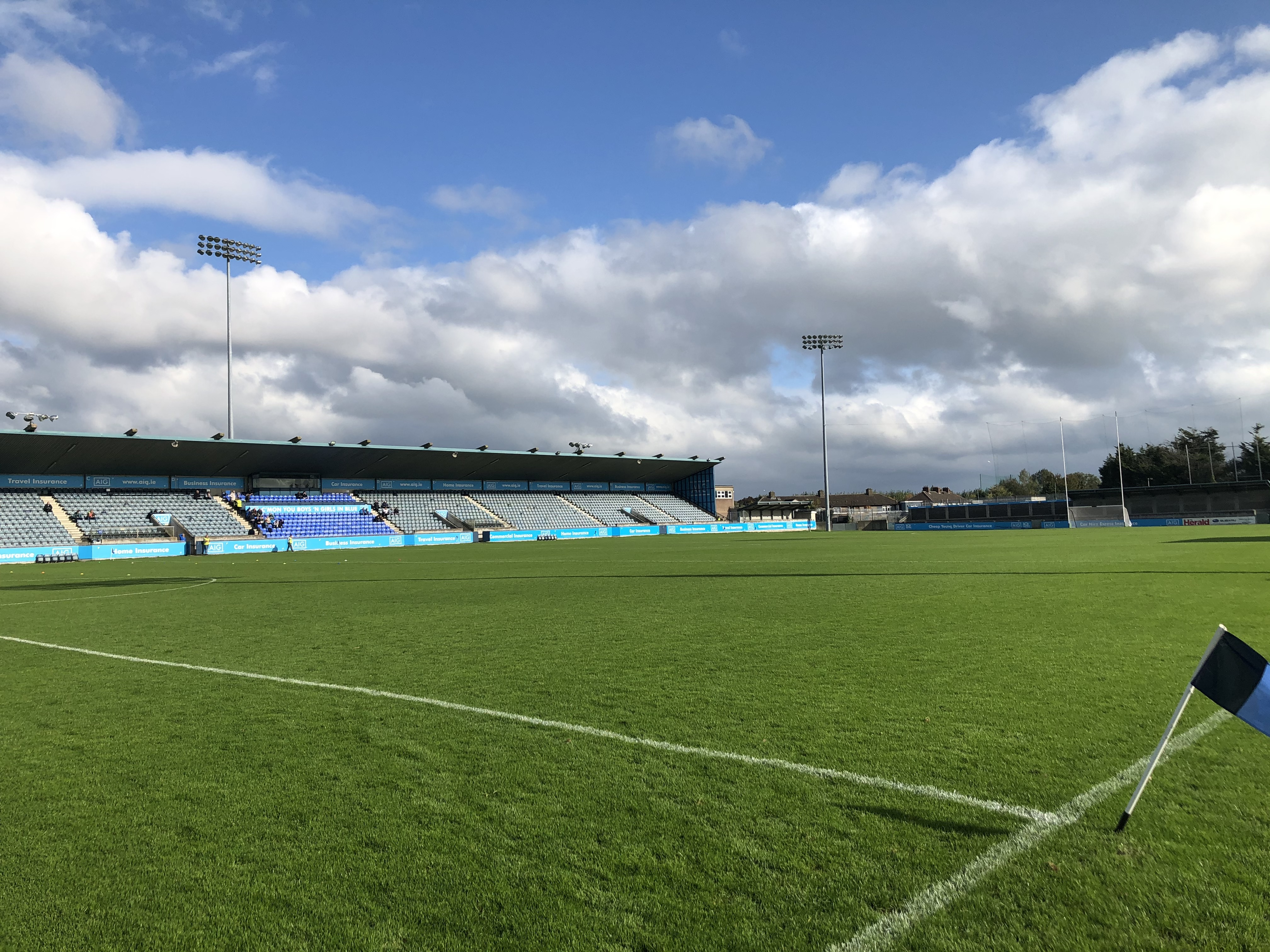

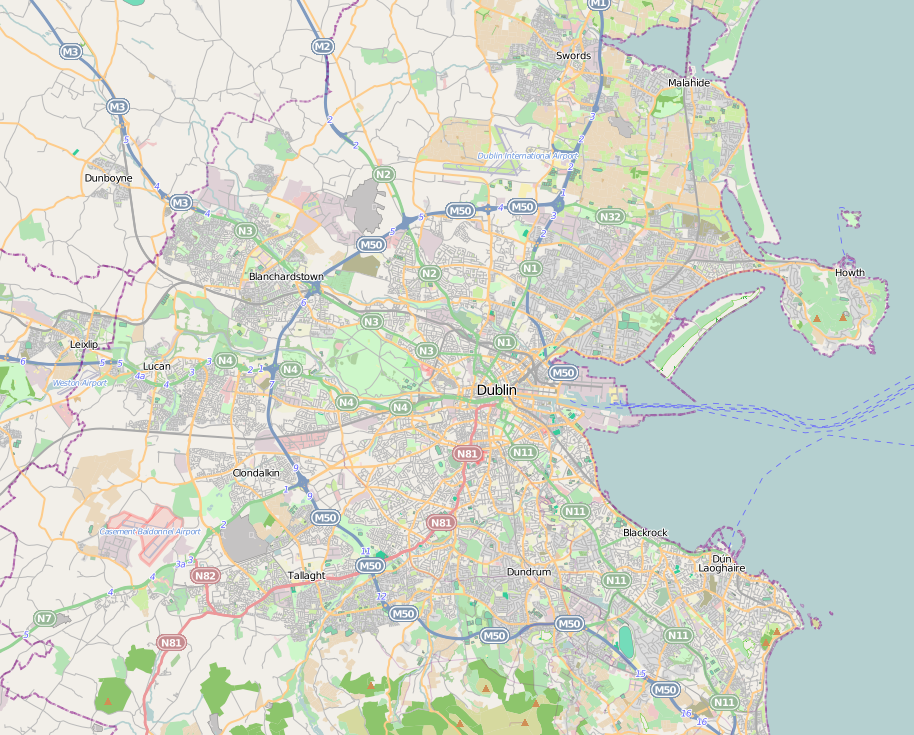
- Location within Dublin
- Former names: Celtic Club Grounds (1901-1912)
- Location: Donnycarney, Dublin 5, D05 X971
- Coordinates: 53°22′22.70″N 6°13′0″W
- Public transit: Killester railway station
- Owner: Dublin GAA
- Capacity: 7,300
- Field size: 141 x 82 m

Construction
- Opened: 1901
- Renovated: 1932-33, 1993-95

Parnell Park is a GAA stadium in Donnycarney, Dublin, Ireland with a capacity of 7,300. It is the home of the Dublin GAA hurling, football, camogie and ladies' football teams at all levels of competition.

The ground is used mainly by the county hurling team during home National Hurling League & All-Ireland Senior Hurling Championship games and as a training ground, with most games played by the county football team in the National Football League and All-Ireland Senior Football Championship being held at Croke Park. However, Dublin county championships and other competitions also take place in Parnell Park every year.

Parnell Park also serves as the headquarters of the Dublin County Board.

== History ==
=== Victoria Park ===
Then known as Victoria Park, the ground was a venue for soccer, rugby, and athletics during the nineteenth century. It was leased to both Richmond Rovers AFC and Civil Service Rugby Club during this time.

=== Gaelic games ===
The ground was first used for Gaelic games in 1901 when it was leased by the Celtic Hurling Club. The following year the lease was taken over by the Dublin Senior Hurling League and in 1912 by Parnell's GAA. The first hurling and football matches took place on 12 May 1901.

=== Dublin GAA ===
The Dublin County Board took over the lease from Parnell's in 1929 and the ground was renovated during 1932-33 for a cost of £400. The first Dublin senior county finals were held at Parnell Park in 1969. Parnell Park was significantly redeveloped between 1988 and 1995, with a new stand, terracing, dressing rooms, offices, and press-box being built. Floodlights were later installed in 2004–05. The first competitive match under lights was played in 2005, and saw Dublin defeat Mayo by 2–13 to 1–15.

== Design ==
Parnell Park has a covered, single-tier main stand on the north side of the pitch which can seat 3,040. The rest of the ground consists of partially covered terracing. Upon completion of the redevelopment programme in 1995 the stadium's capacity stood at 9,000. However this was subsequently reduced to 7,300 for safety reasons.

== See also ==
- List of Gaelic Athletic Association stadiums
- List of stadiums in Ireland by capacity
