= Harmonstown railway station =

Suburban rail (DART) stop, northern Dublin, Ireland

Harmonstown Baile Hearman
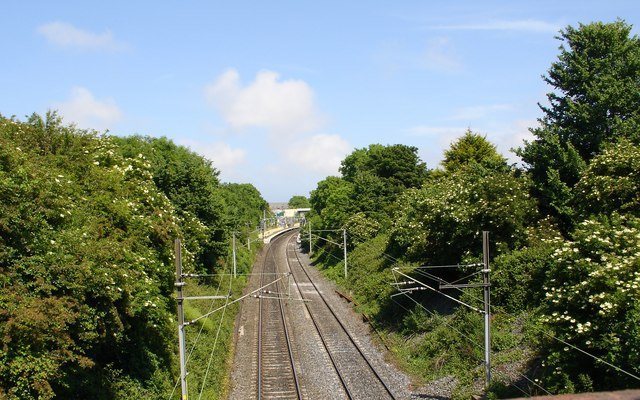
- Harmonstown Station in 2014

General information
- Location: Harmonstown Road, Dublin 5 Ireland
- Coordinates: 53.3785°N 6.1922°W
- Owner: Iarnród Éireann
- Line: Belfast–Dublin line
- Platforms: 2
- Tracks: 2

Construction
- Structure type: in cutting

Other information
- Station code: HTOWN
- Fare zone: Suburban 1

History
- Opened: 27 January 1957

Services
Preceding station	Iarnród Éireann	Following station
Killester towards Greystones	DART	Raheny towards Malahide or Howth
Route map
Location

Harmonstown railway station (Irish: Baile Hearman), is a stop on the DART line serving the locality of Harmonstown and the nearer parts of Artane and Raheny in Dublin, Ireland.

== Facilities ==
The small station, which has no parking, is located on the rail bridge between Harmonstown Road and the Ennafort / Cill Eanna part of Raheny, and the platforms are below in a cutting.

== History ==
The station opened on 27 January 1957.

== See also ==
- List of railway stations in Ireland
