= Iarnród Éireann =

Ireland's national railway operator

Iarnród Éireann Irish Rail
- Iarnród Éireann's current logo since 2013.

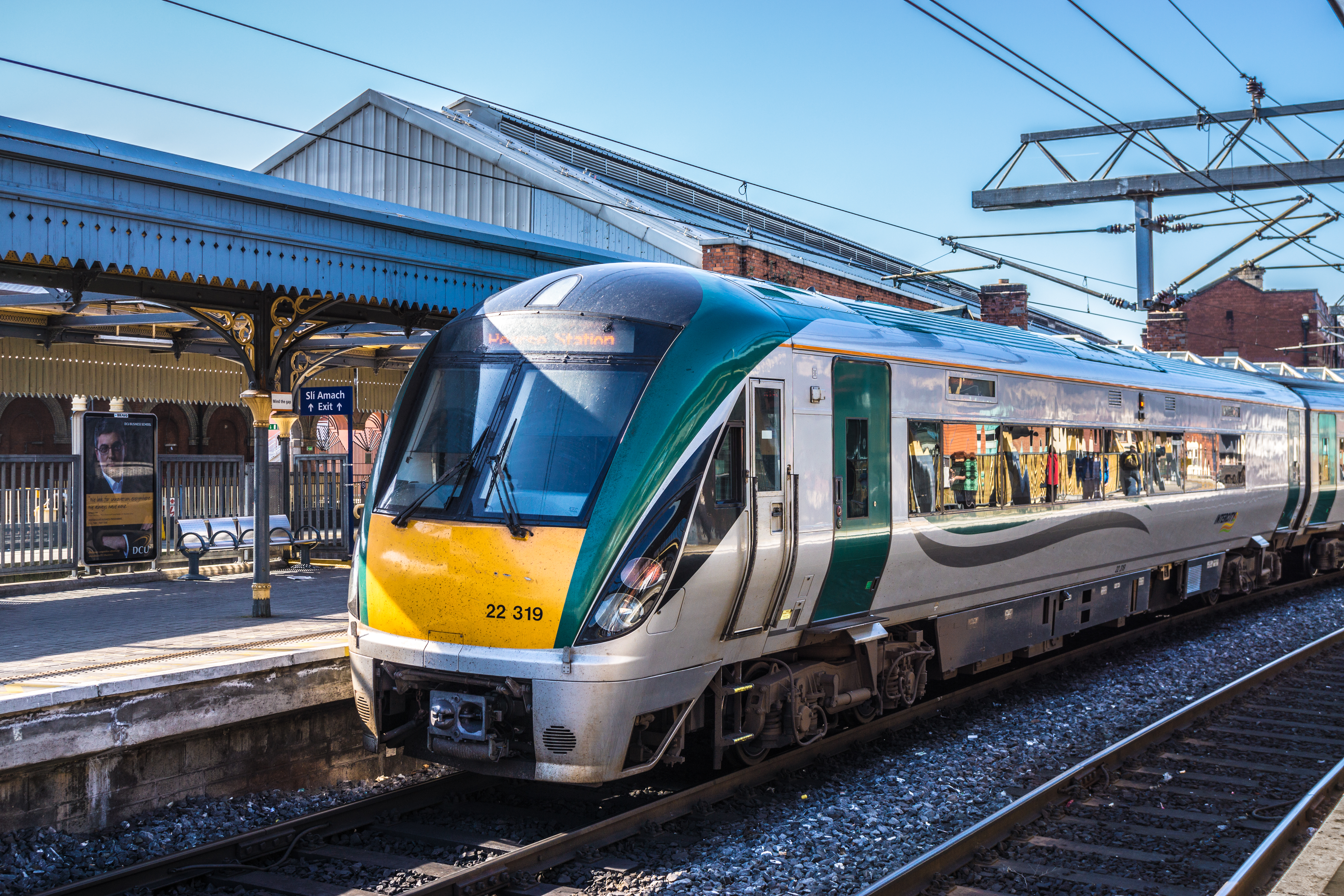
- An Iarnród Éireann train in Connolly station
- Type: Subsidiary of a state-owned enterprise
- Industry: Rail transport
- Predecessor: CIÉ Railways Division (1945–1987)
- Founded: February 2, 1987; 39 years ago
- Headquarters: Connolly Station, Dublin 1, D01 V6V6, Ireland
- Area served: Ireland
- Key people: Mary Considine (Chief Executive); Ultan Courtney (Chairman)
- Revenue: ▲€297.4 million (2019)
- Operating income: ▲€529 million (2019)
- Net income: ▲€4.2 million (2019)
- Owner: CIÉ (100%)
- Number of employees: 3,897 (2019)
- Parent: Córas Iompair Éireann
- Subsidiaries: InterCity; Commuter; DART; Iarnród Éireann Freight
- Website: irishrail.ie

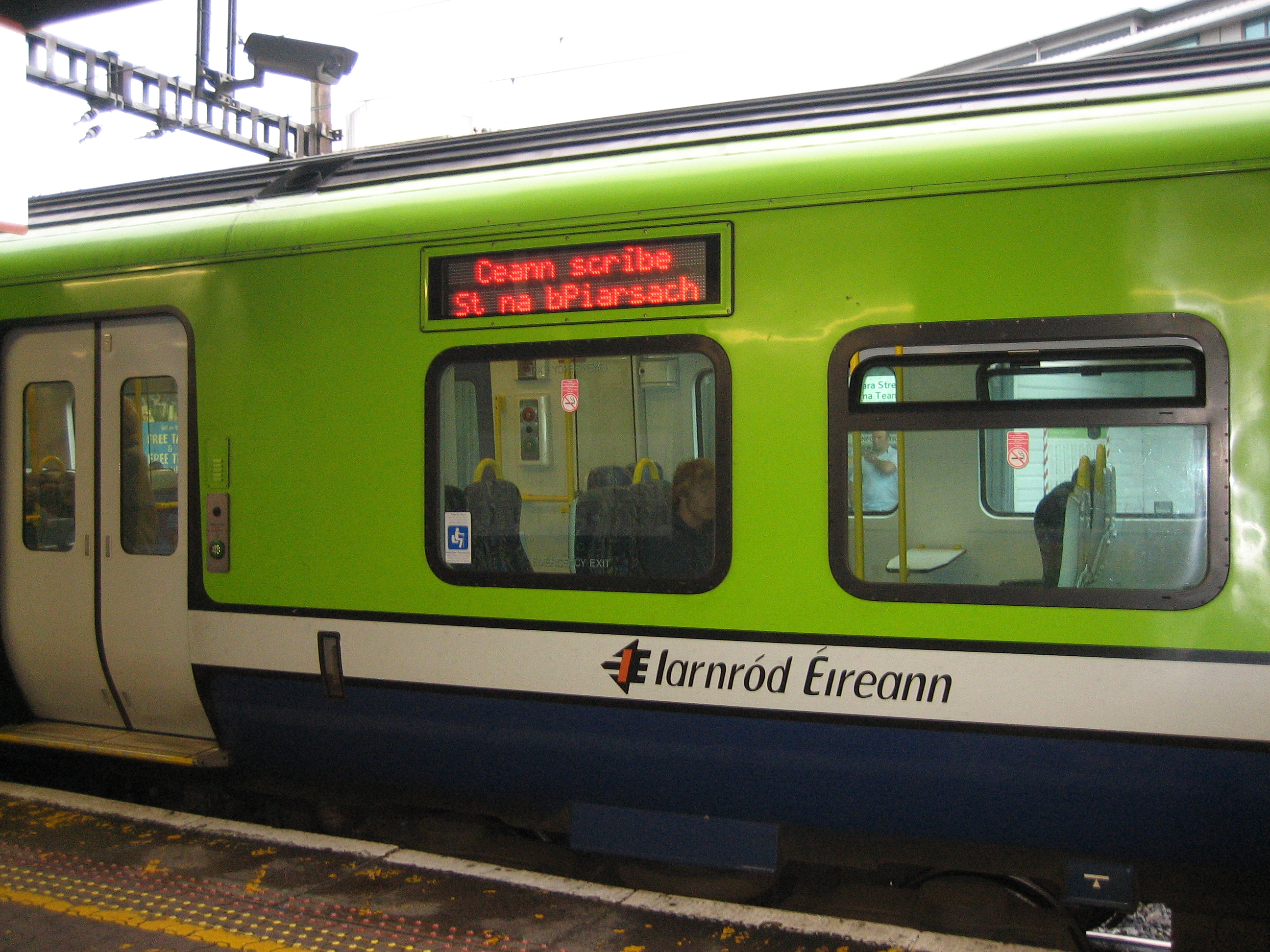
A 29000 Class Commuter train at Tara Street Station, Dublin, in 2006. The LED display is showing "Destination: Pearse Station" in Irish.

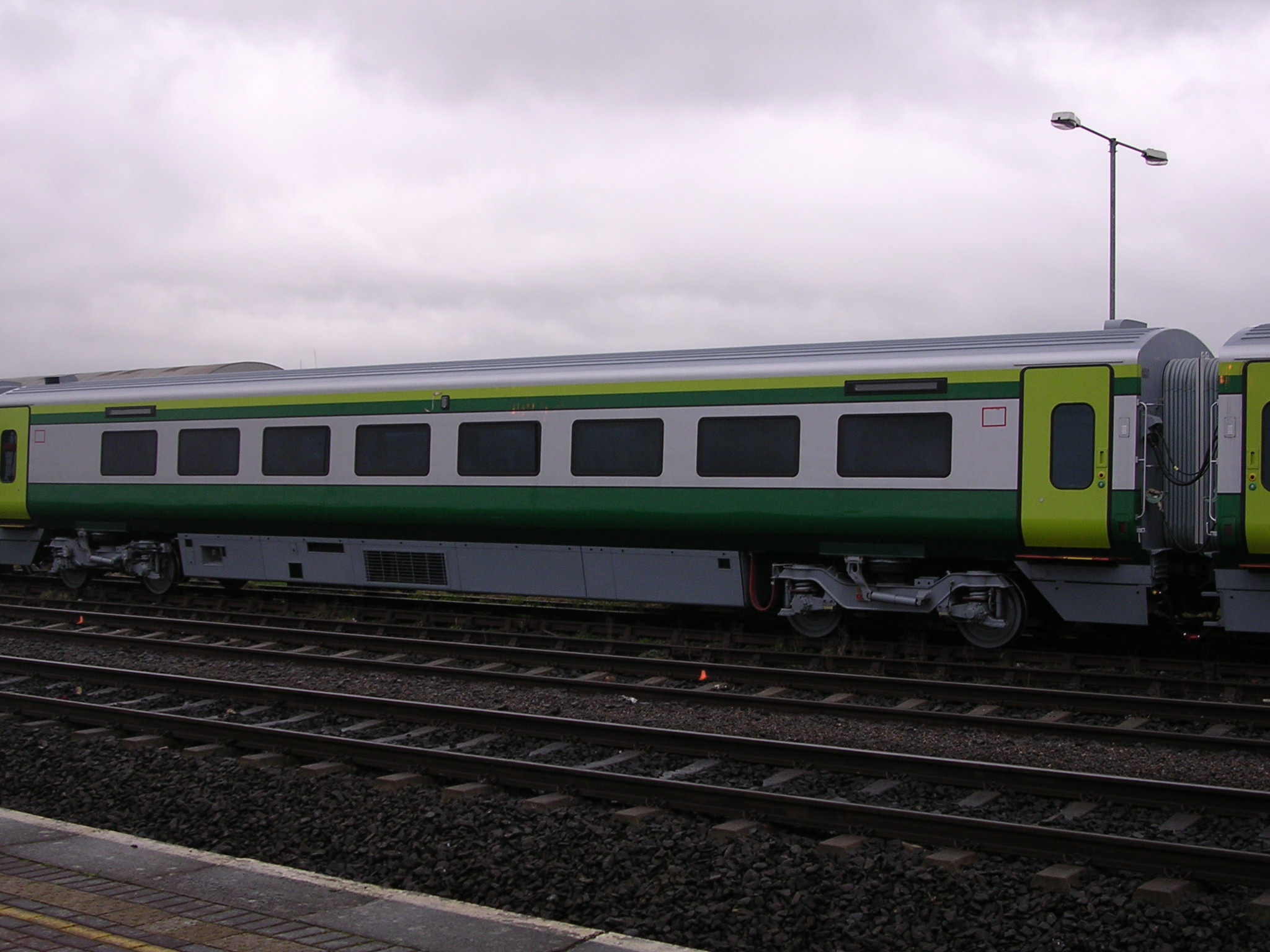
A Mark 4 carriage on the Dublin–Cork railway line

The original four rails logo 1987–1994

Iarnród Éireann, (Irish: [ˈiəɾˠnˠɾˠoːd̪ˠ ˈeːɾʲən̪ˠ]) or Irish Rail, is the operator of the national railway network of Ireland. Established on 2 February 1987, it is a subsidiary of Córas Iompair Éireann (CIÉ). It operates all internal InterCity, Commuter, DART and freight railway services in the Republic of Ireland, and, jointly with Northern Ireland Railways, the Enterprise service between Dublin and Belfast. In 2025, IÉ carried a record peak of 55 million passengers.

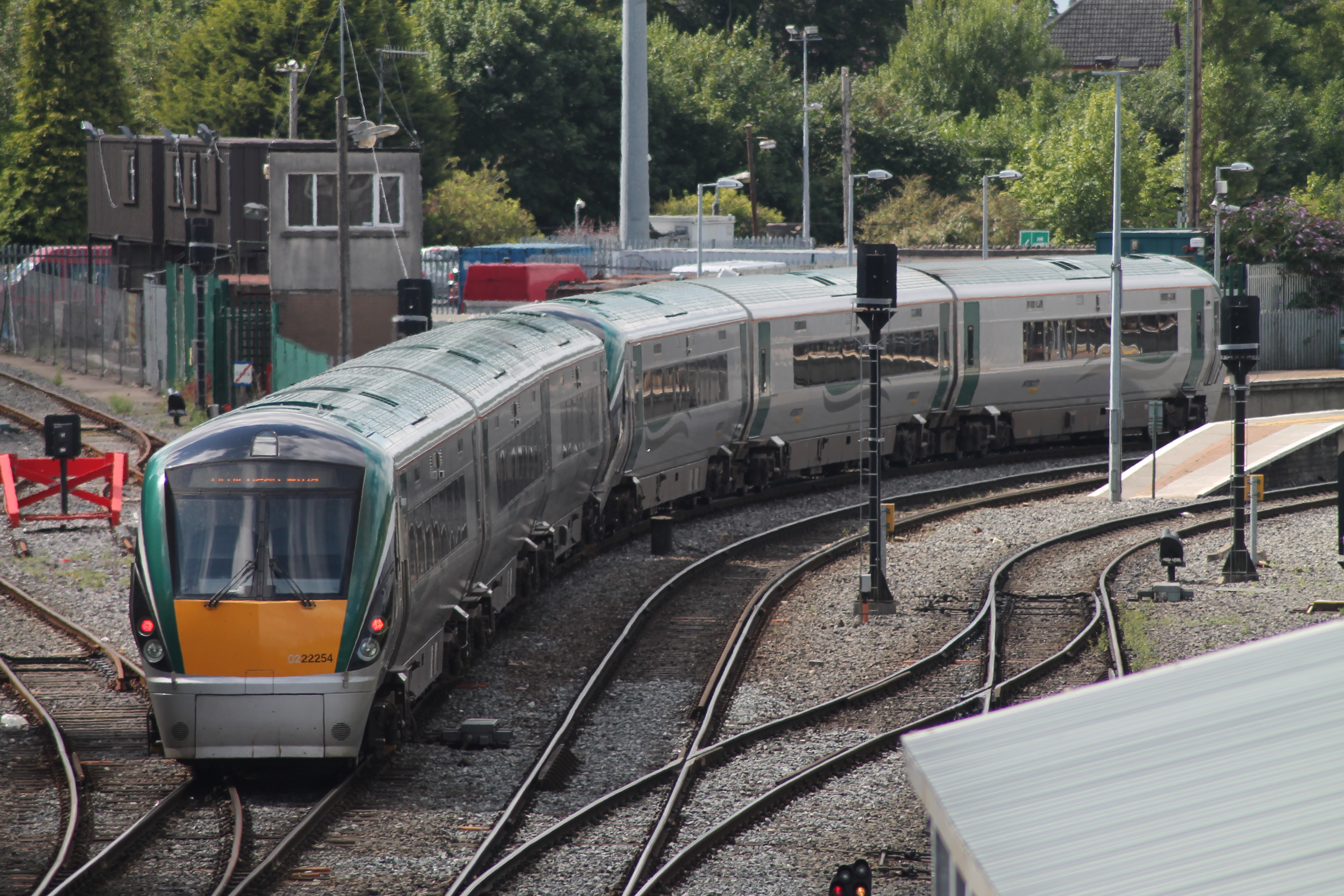
An IÉ 22000 Class DMU (22054) at Drogheda MacBride

Until 2013, Ireland was the only European Union state that had not implemented EU Directive 91/440 and related legislation, having derogated from its obligation to split train operations and infrastructure businesses, and allow open access by private companies to the rail network. A consultation on the restructuring of Iarnród Éireann took place in 2012. The derogation ended on 14 March 2013 when the company was split in 2 sectors: Railway Undertaking and Infrastructure Manager.

Mary Considine was appointed Chief Executive of Iarnród Éireann in October 2025.

== Organisation ==
At the time of its establishment, the company referred to itself as Irish Rail and adopted the four rails IR logo. In 1994, the company brought the Irish form of its name to the fore, introducing a logo and corporate branding based on the letters IÉ (Iarnród Éireann) branding and logo. Both languages remained part of the official company name ("Iarnród Éireann – Irish Rail"). In January 2013, a new logo was introduced with a new bilingual branding; it made its first appearance in early January on online timetables, before officially launching on the 21st. In late 2013 the logo was updated again with a new font.

Operationally, services are divided across four regional areas:

- Northern and Eastern services are managed from Connolly (including Sligo in the North-West)
- Southern and Western services are managed from Heuston

== Services ==
=== Passenger services ===
IÉ's passenger services are branded under three main names; InterCity, Commuter and DART.

==== InterCity ====
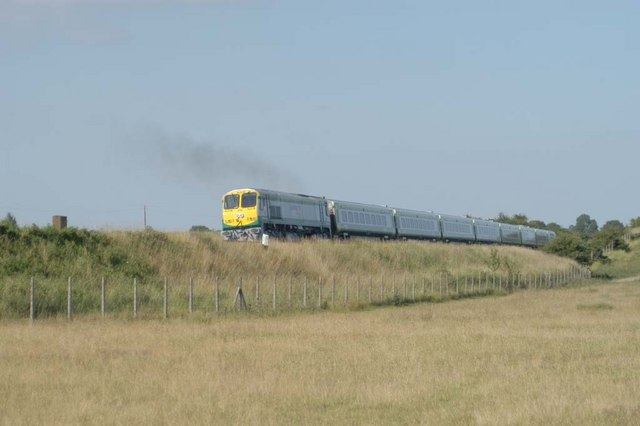
Train passing through the Curragh in County Kildare

InterCity services are long-distance routes radiating mainly from Dublin. The Belfast – Dublin service, jointly operated with Northern Ireland Railways, is branded separately as Enterprise. Dublin's two main InterCity stations are Connolly and Heuston. Intercity services run to/from Cork, Limerick, Tralee, Ennis, Galway, Waterford, Rosslare Europort, Sligo, Westport, Wexford and Ballina. Dublin's third major station, Pearse, is the terminus for much of the suburban network in the Greater Dublin area. An additional two InterCity services runs from Limerick to Limerick Junction and from Limerick Junction to Waterford. This service formerly operated through to Rosslare Europort but services between Waterford and Rosslare Europort ceased after the last train on 18 September 2010. Bus Éireann now operates route 370 through the affected towns as replacement transport.

A new service began on 29 March 2010 from Limerick to Galway, as part of the Western Rail Corridor, reopening the long-closed line.

A January 2012 national newspaper article suggested that Iarnród Éireann was expected to seek permission in the near future from the National Transport Authority to close the Limerick–Ballybrophy railway line and the Limerick–Waterford line.

==== Commuter ====
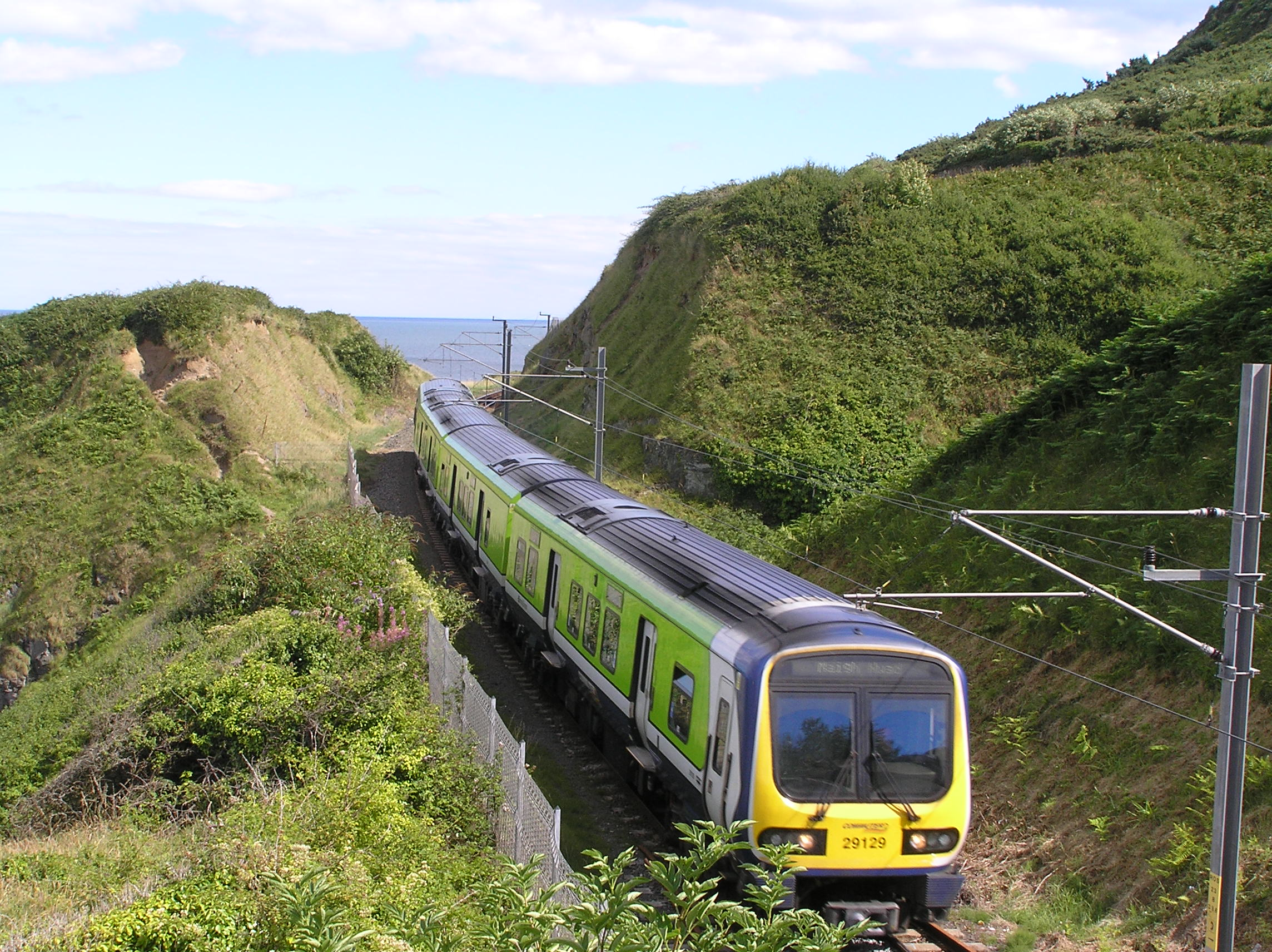
A 29000 Class in the old 'plug' livery south of Bray Daly

The majority of Commuter services are based in Dublin, which has four commuter routes: Northern (to Drogheda MacBride), Western (Connolly Station or Docklands to Maynooth/M3 Parkway), South-Western (to Portlaoise) and South-Eastern (to Kilcoole). See Dublin Suburban Rail for more details. The Cork Suburban Rail currently has three Commuter services: to Mallow and Cobh, and a third service to Midleton which became operational on a part of the disused Youghal branch line on 30 July 2009. Limerick Suburban Rail currently consists of two lines to Ennis and Nenagh, with shuttle services to Limerick Junction. A Commuter service operates between Galway to Oranmore and Athenry.

Commuter trains also operate on shuttle duty for branches from the main InterCity services from Mallow to Tralee (off the Dublin – Cork route) and from Manulla Junction to Ballina (off the Dublin – Westport route), as well as acting as InterCity trains for Dublin – Rosslare and some Dublin – Sligo services, and as the aforementioned Limerick – Limerick Junction – Waterford service.

==== DART ====
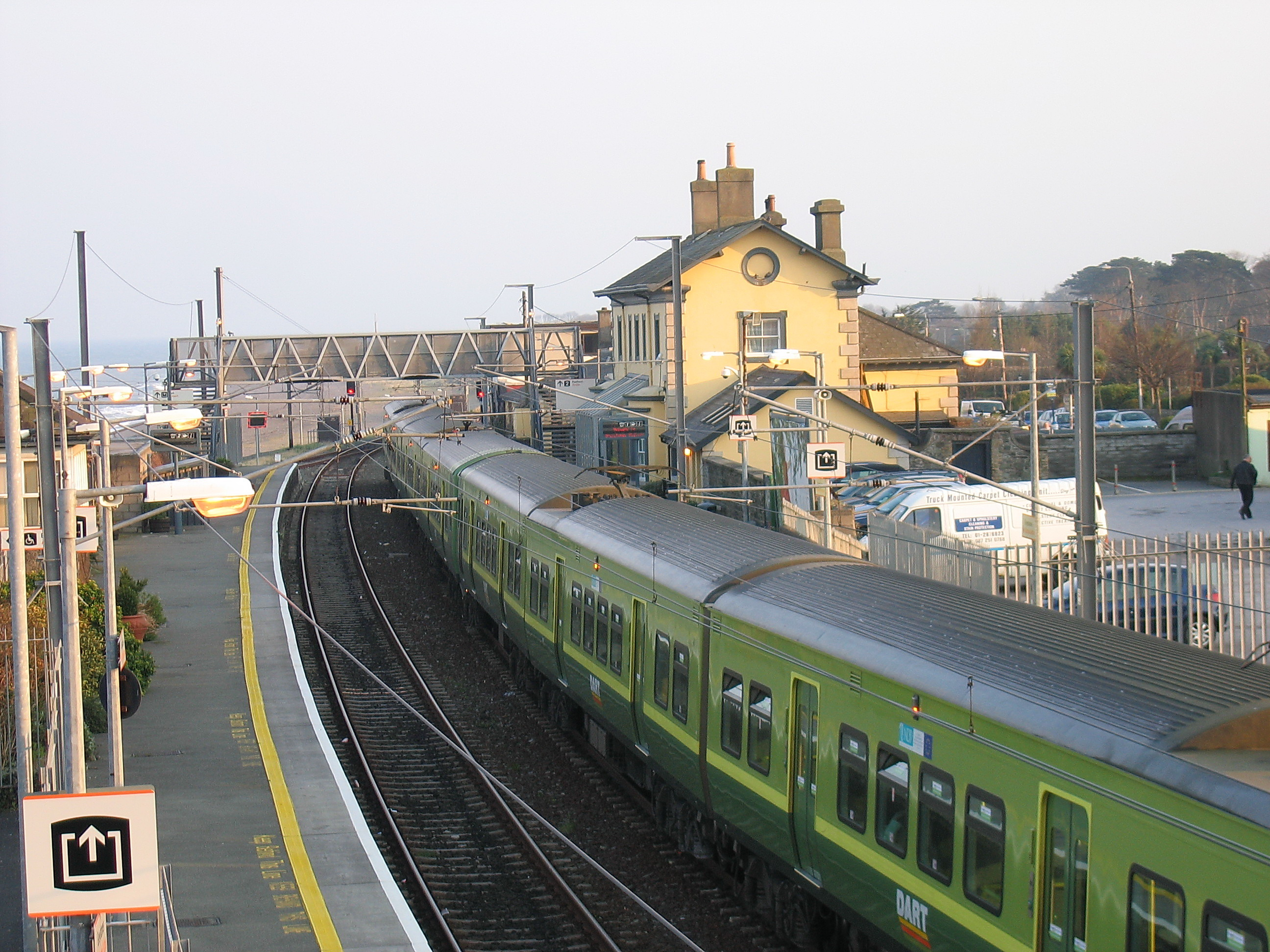
A DART 8500 Class in Greystones

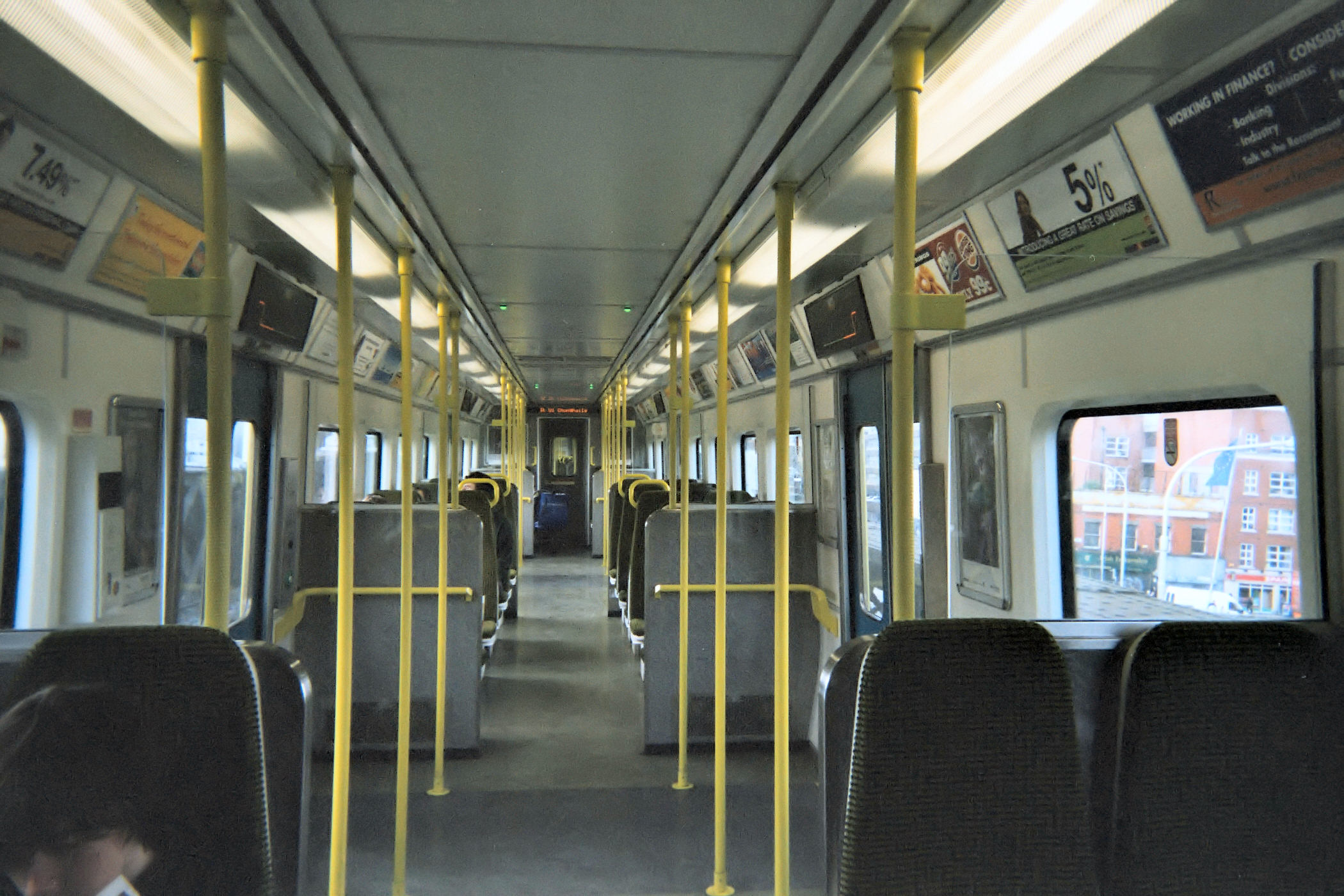
Interior of the DART 8520 Class

The north–south route along Dublin's eastern coastal side is also host to DART, Ireland's only electrified heavy-rail service. The DART consists of many types of trains, the oldest and most famous one being the 8100 Class which still operates, now extensively refurbished.

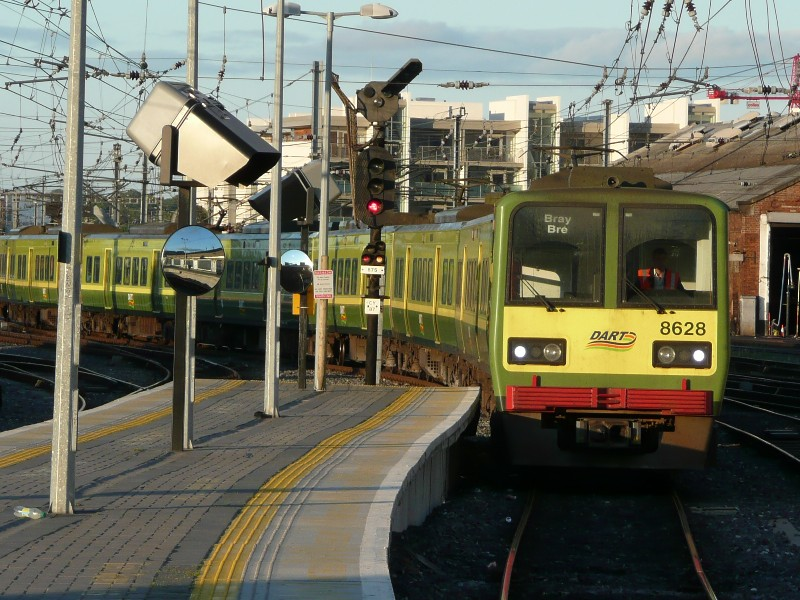
A DART 8520 Class arriving at Connolly Station

==== Services table ====
The following is a simplified table of Monday - Friday off-peak services. Various irregular calling patterns have been omitted for clarity.

Route		Frequency Per Direction	Calling at
Enterprise	Dublin Connolly to Belfast Grand Central station	1tph	Drogheda MacBride, Dundalk Clarke, Newry, Portadown, Lurgan (1tpw) Lisburn (1tpw) service jointly operated with NI Railways
Sligo InterCity	Dublin Connolly to Sligo MacDiarmada	1tp2h	Drumcondra, Broombridge, Leixlip Louisa Bridge, Maynooth, Kilcock, Enfield, Mullingar, Edgeworthstown, Longford, Dromod, Carrick-on-Shannon, Boyle, Ballymote, Collooney
Mayo InterCity	Dublin Heuston to Westport	5tpd	Kildare (1tpd), Portarlington, Tullamore, Clara, Athlone, Roscommon, Castlerea, Ballyhaunis, Claremorris, Manulla Junction, Castlebar
Mayo InterCity	Manulla Junction to Ballina	1tp2h	Foxford
Galway InterCity	Dublin Heuston to Galway Ceannt	>1tp2h	Portarlington, Tullamore, Clara, Athlone, Ballinasloe, Woodlawn, Attymon (4tpd), Athenry, Oranmore
Limerick InterCity	Dublin Heuston to Limerick Colbert	1tph	Portlaoise, Ballybrophy (1tpd), Templemore (2tpd), Thurles, Limerick Junction
Limerick InterCity	Ballybrophy – Limerick Colbert	2tpd	Roscrea, Cloughjordan, Nenagh, Birdhill, Castleconnell
Cork Intercity	Dublin Heuston to Cork Kent	1tph	Portlaoise, Ballybrophy (2tpd) Templemore (1tpd), Thurles, Limerick Junction, Charleville (1tpd), Mallow
Tralee Intercity	Dublin Heuston to Tralee	1tp2h	Ballybrophy, Templemore, Thurles, Charleville, Banteer, Millstreet, Rathmore, Killarney, Farranfore
Waterford Intercity	Dublin Heuston to Waterford Plunkett	9tpd	Hazelhatch and Celbridge (1tpd), Sallins and Naas (1tpd), Newbridge (3tpd), Kildare (7tpd), Athy, Carlow, Muine Bheag, Kilkenny, Thomastown
Wexford Intercity	Dublin Connolly to Rosslare Europort	4tpd	Tara Street, Dublin Pearse, Grand Canal Dock (2tpd northbound-only), Lansdowne Road (2tpd northbound-only), Blackrock (2tpd northbound-only), Dún Laoghaire Mallin, Bray Daly, Greystones, Kilcoole (5tpd), Wicklow, Rathdrum, Arklow, Gorey, Enniscorthy, Wexford and Rosslare Strand. 6 tpd (per direction) from Connolly to Gorey. 5 tpd (per direction) from Connolly to Wexford O'Hanrahan.
Waterford – Limerick	Waterford Plunkett to Limerick Junction	2tpd	Carrick-on-Suir, Clonmel, Cahir, Tipperary
Limerick – Galway	Limerick Colbert to Ennis	9tpd	Sixmilebridge
Limerick – Galway	Limerick Colbert to Galway Ceannt	5tpd	Sixmilebridge, Ennis, Gort, Ardrahan, Craughwell, Athenry, Oranmore 2tpd operate to/from Limerick Junction.
Limerick – Galway	Athenry to Galway Ceannt	2tpd	Oranmore
Northern Commuter	Dublin Connolly to Drogheda MacBride	1tph	Howth Junction and Donaghmede (1tpd), Clongriffin (1tpd), Portmarnock (2tpd), Malahide, Donabate, Rush & Lusk, Skerries, Balbriggan, Gormanston, Laytown some peak trains run to/from Dundalk Clarke, Dublin Pearse, Bray Daly, Gorey or Rosslare Europort
South Western Commuter	Grand Canal Dock to Hazelhatch and Celbridge	1tph	Dublin Pearse, Tara Street, Dublin Connolly, Drumcondra, Park West and Cherry Orchard, Clondalkin/Fonthill, Kishoge and Adamstown
South Western Commuter	Dublin Heuston to Portlaoise	2tph	Park West and Cherry Orchard, Clondalkin/Fonthill, Kishoge, Adamstown, Hazelhatch and Celbridge, Sallins and Naas, Newbridge (1tph terminates), Kildare, Monasterevin and Portarlington
Western Commuter	Dublin Connolly to Maynooth	2tph	Drumcondra, Broombridge, Pelletstown, Ashtown, Navan Road Parkway, Castleknock, Coolmine, Clonsilla, Leixlip Confey and Leixlip Louisa BridgeSome peak-hour trains operate to/from Dublin Pearse. 3tpd continue to Mullingar/Longford (both call at all stations)
Western Commuter	Clonsilla to M3 Parkway	1tph	Hansfield and Dunboyne
Western Commuter	Docklands to M3 Parkway (Monday – Friday only)	12tpd	Broombridge, Pelletstown, Ashtown, Navan Road Parkway, Castleknock, Coolmine, Clonsilla, Hansfield and Dunboyne
Cork Commuter	Cork Kent to Midleton	2tph	Littleisland, Glounthaune and Carrigtwohill
Cork Commuter	Cork Kent to Cobh	2tph	Littleisland, Glounthaune, Fota, Carrigaloe and Rushbrooke
DART	Howth to Bray Daly	3tph	Sutton, Bayside, Howth Junction & Donaghmede, Kilbarrack, Raheny, Harmonstown, Killester, Clontarf Road, Dublin Connolly, Tara Street, Dublin Pearse, Grand Canal Dock, Lansdowne Road, Sandymount, Sydney Parade, Booterstown, Blackrock, Seapoint, Salthill & Monkstown, Dún Laoghaire Mallin, Sandycove & Glasthule, Glenageary, Dalkey, Killiney and Shankill. 1tph extended to Greystones.
DART	Malahide to Bray Daly	3tph	Portmarnock, Clongriffin, Howth Junction & Donaghmede, Kilbarrack, Raheny, Harmonstown, Killester, Clontarf Road, Dublin Connolly, Tara Street, Dublin Pearse, Grand Canal Dock, Lansdowne Road, Sandymount, Sydney Parade, Booterstown, Blackrock, Seapoint, Salthill & Monkstown, Dún Laoghaire Mallin, Sandycove & Glasthule, Glenageary, Dalkey, Killiney and Shankill. 1tph extended to Greystones.

=== Freight services ===
Iarnród Éireann also has responsibility for running freight services on the Irish network through its Freight Division – which recorded a tonnage decrease of 19.2% in 2019, and as of 2020, there are 3 freight flows running throughout the country. This operates both Railfreight trains and a network of road haulage through various distribution nodes throughout the country. Iarnród Éireann Freight is subdivided into three sections:

- Bulk Freight – specialises in operating full trainloads of freight, usually bulk movements of single products such as cement, mineral ore or timber.
- Intermodal – container trains, currently operated between Waterford Port and Ballina and Dublin Port and Ballina.
- Navigator – the freight forwarding division, particularly associated with the transport of automotive stock parts.

== Operational details ==
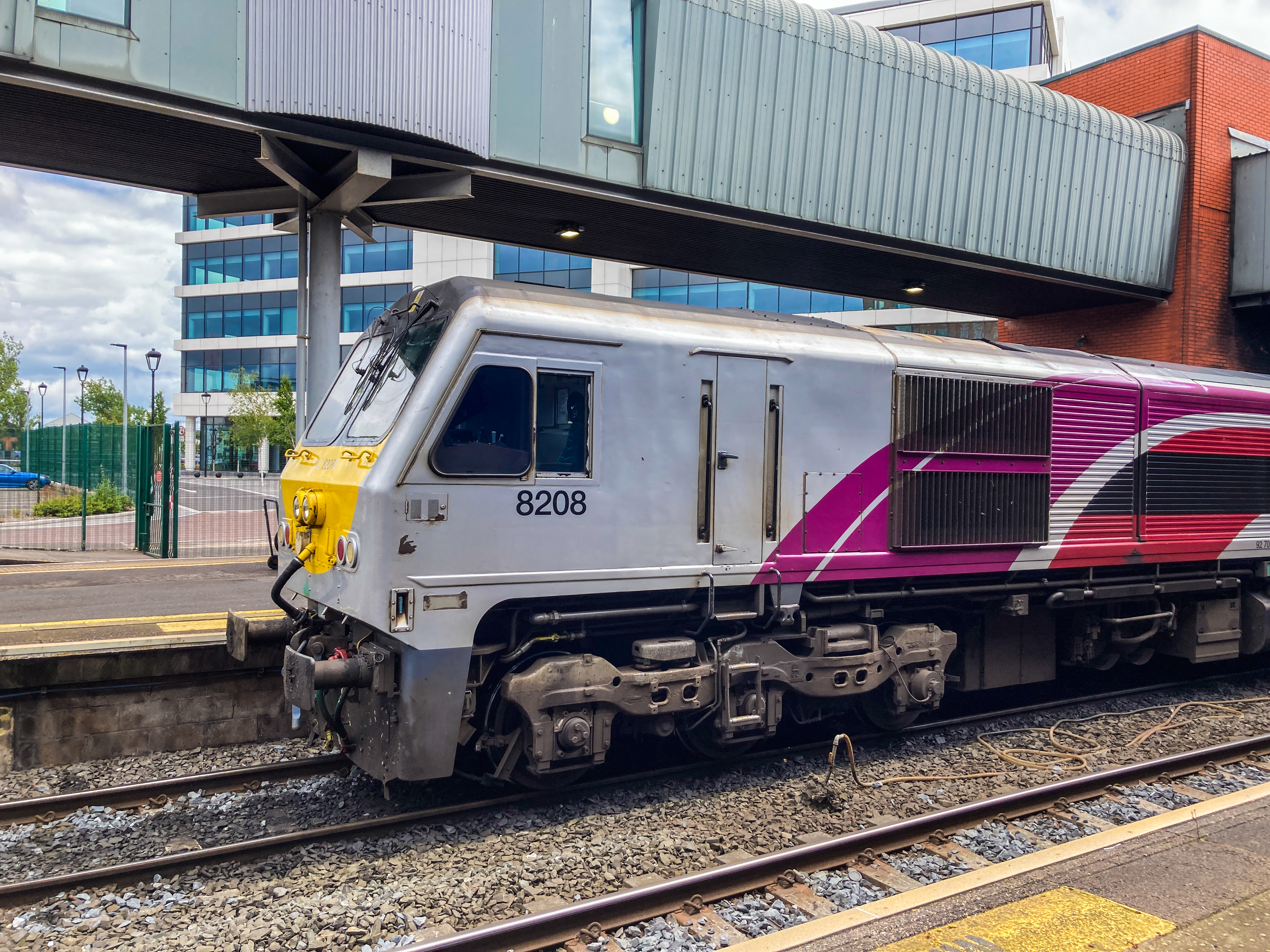
The Dublin-Belfast Enterprise, which is jointly operated by IE/NIR, seen at Belfast Lanyon Place Station awaiting its next departure to Dublin.

Map of Ireland's rail transport infrastructure, showing number of tracks, electrification and maximum speed.

The Enterprise route (Dublin to Belfast) is well regarded. However, it is only double track and serves both local and intermediate Commuter as well as InterCity traffic. Hence any delay has knock-on effects. Also, there is limited platform availability at Connolly Station in Dublin. There was also a persistent problem with engine overloading, as Enterprise locomotives also supplied coach power. However, since September 2012, additional power is provided by separate Mark 3 generator vans.

The Cork-Dublin route was formerly the "premier line" of the Great Southern and Western Railway, one of the biggest pre-CIÉ operators. Rolling stock on this route consists of Mark 4 trains, which were built in Spain, complete with DVTs for faster turn-around. 22000 Class DMUs built in South Korea came into service from early 2007 replacing older coaching stock on most other InterCity routes. These 183 carriages are described by the company as the "Greenest diesel trains in Europe".

The former Minister for Transport, Noel Dempsey TD had announced that an additional 51 railcars had been ordered for the company for a planned introduction on services between Dublin, Louth, and Meath. They were placed into service in 2011/2012 but this plan was badly affected by the recession with 21 surpluses to requirements at the end of 2012.

The maximum operational speed of InterCity trains on the IÉ rail network is 160 km/h (100 mph), although the design speed of the Mark 4 carriages is 201 km/h (125 mph).

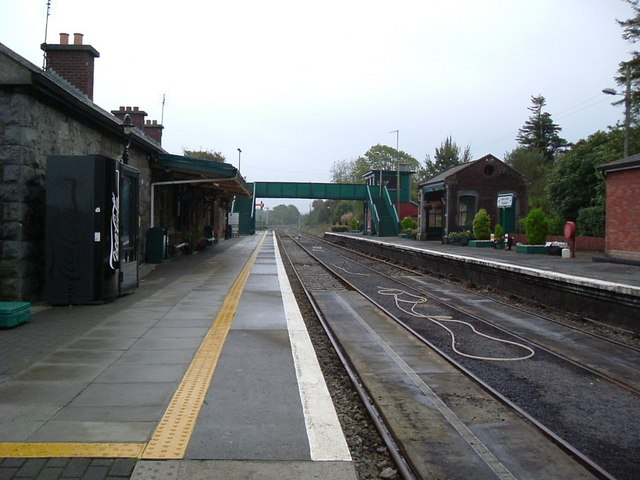
Westport Railway Station

Since 2019, Iarnród Éireann has been trying to recruit more female drivers.

== 1916 station renaming ==
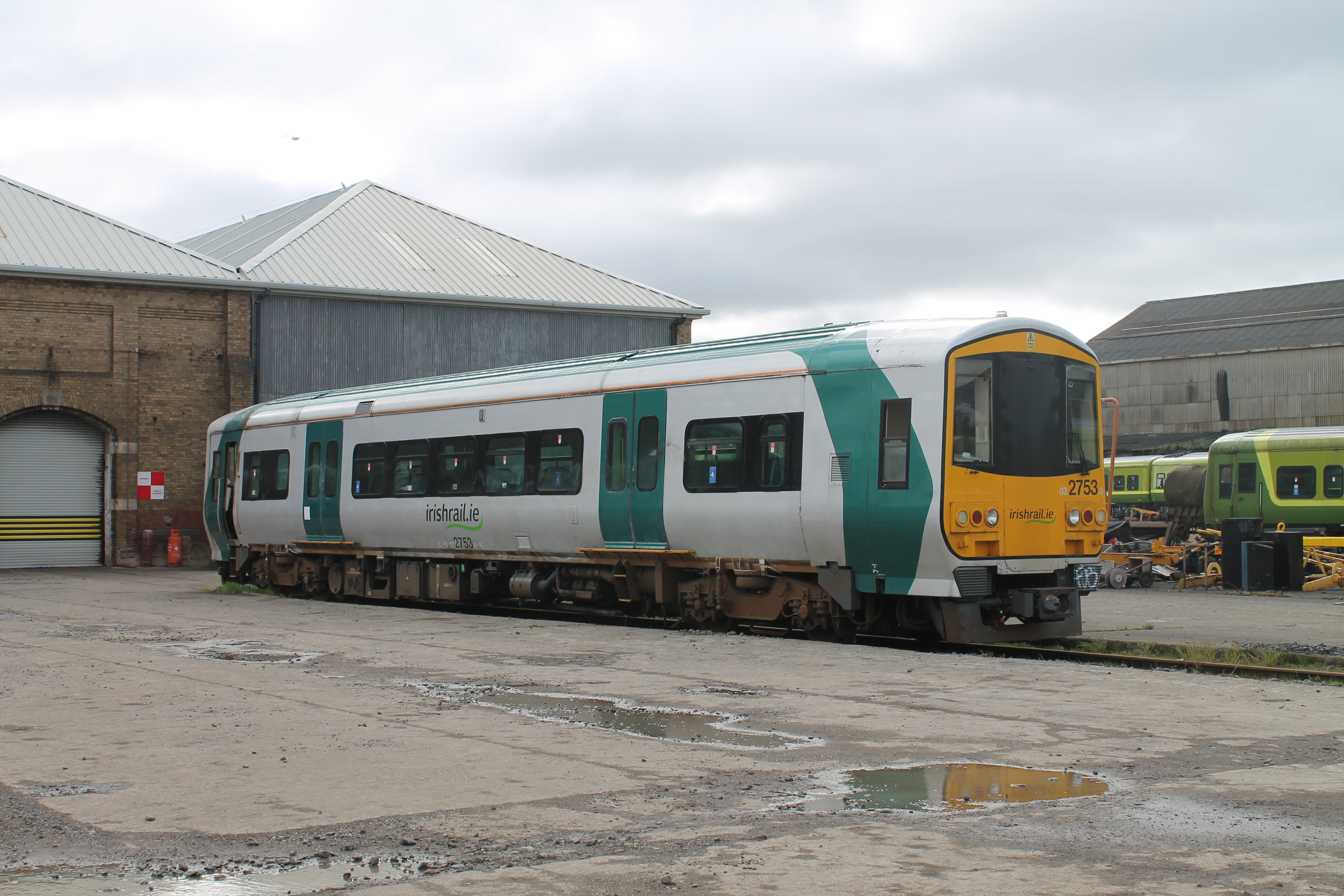
IÉ 2750 Class DMU (2753) at Inchicore Works

Although the majority of Iarnród Éireann's stations are simply named after the towns they serve, a number of stations in major towns and cities were renamed after leaders of the 1916 Easter Rising, on its 50th anniversary in 1966:

- Dublin Connolly (formerly Amiens Street)
- Dublin Heuston (formerly Kingsbridge)
- Dublin Pearse (formerly Westland Row)
- Dún Laoghaire Mallin
- Bray Daly
- Cork Kent (formerly Glanmire Road)
- Kilkenny MacDonagh
- Limerick Colbert
- Tralee Casement
- Dundalk Clarke
- Drogheda MacBride
- Sligo Mac Diarmada
- Galway Ceannt
- Waterford Plunkett
- Wexford O'Hanrahan

== Network Catering ==
IÉ's Network Catering unit provided a trolley service of food and drink, a snack car and (on some routes) a restaurant service. It also operated a restaurant at Dún Laoghaire. According to Iarnród Éireann's annual report, the unit lost €297,000 in 2004. In 2006, Iarnród Éireann outsourced the catering on the Dublin-Belfast service to Corporate Catering Ltd, and all InterCity services were taken over by Rail Gourmet in March 2007. Rail Gourmet withdrew from the contract in 2020, and no longer provides catering for any Iarnród Éireann services. In 2023, a contactless catering service was established on the Cork to Dublin line.

== Rolling stock ==
(excluding the Enterprise service):

- InterCity services have a fleet of 265 carriages.
- Commuter services have a fleet of 148 carriages.
- DART services have a fleet of 134 carriages.
- Dublin-Belfast Enterprise has a fleet of 28 carriages.

=== InterCity and Enterprise fleet ===
- IÉ 201 Class Locomotive
- IÉ 22000 Class DMU
- Mark 4
- De Dietrich Rolling stock

=== Locomotive fleet ===
==== Current ====
- CIÉ 071 Class/NIR Class 110 locomotive
- IÉ 201 Class/NIR Class 201 locomotive

==== Former ====
- CIÉ 001 Class locomotive
- CIÉ 201 Class locomotive
- CIÉ 121 Class locomotive
- CIÉ 141 Class locomotive
- CIÉ 181 Class locomotive

=== Commuter fleet ===
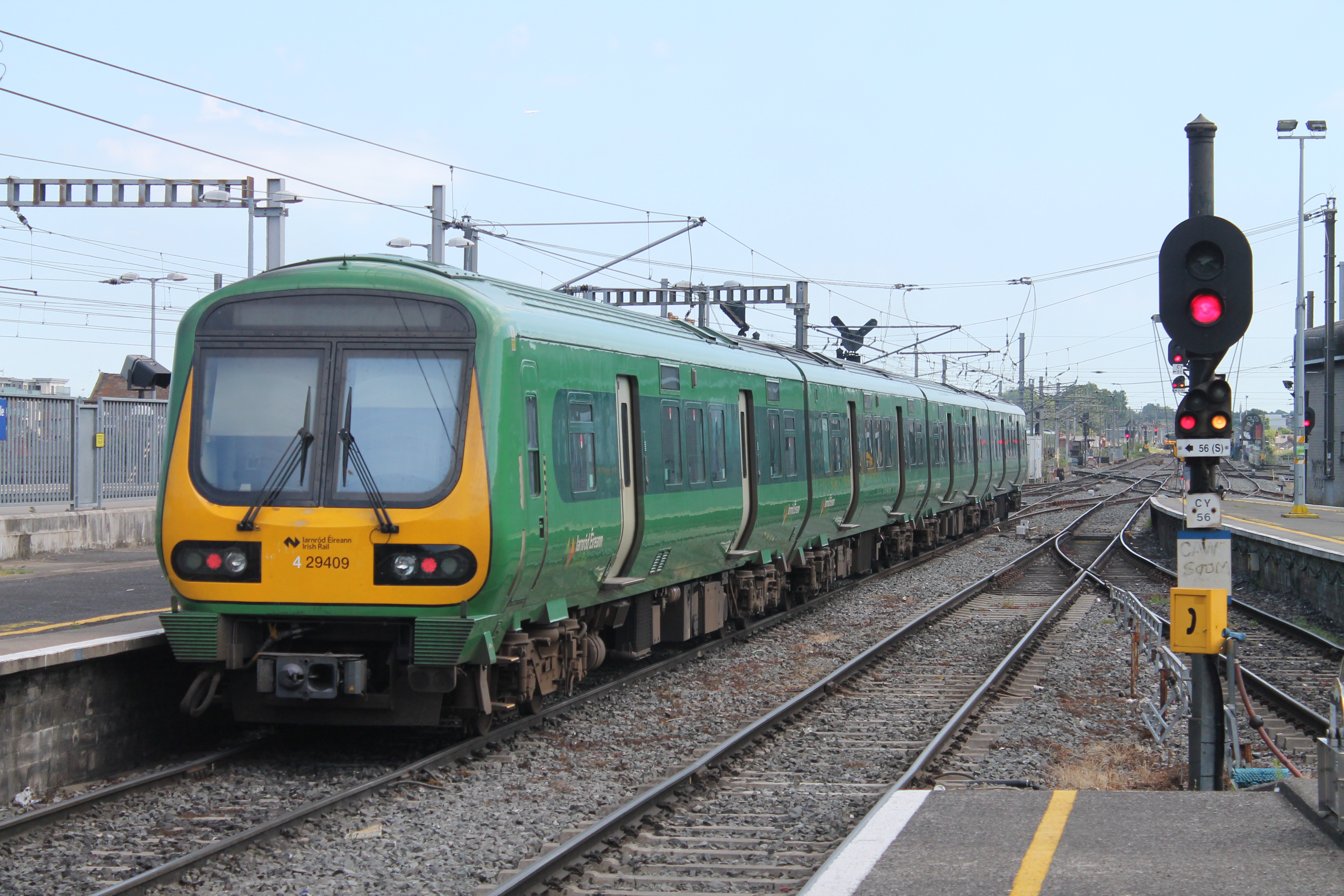
An Iarnród Éireann 29000 Class DMU (29409) at Dublin Connolly Station, in Dublin

==== Current ====
- IÉ 2600 Class DMU
- IÉ 2800 Class DMU
- IÉ 29000 Class DMU
- IÉ 22000 Class DMU

==== Former ====
- IÉ 2700 Class DMU
- IÉ 2750 Class DMU

=== DART fleet ===
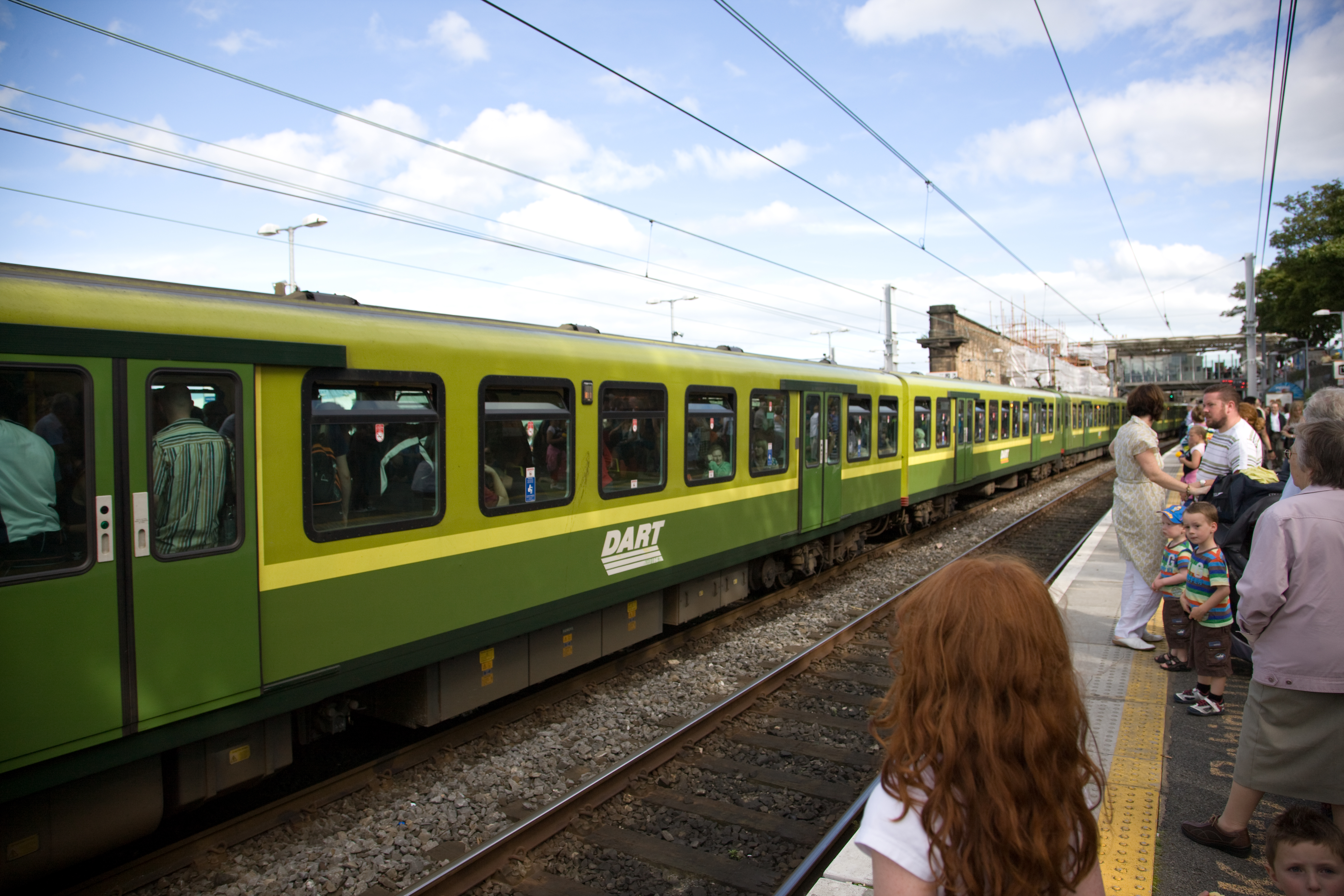
IÉ 8300 Class at Dún Laoghaire

==== Current ====
- CIÉ 8100 Class EMU
- IÉ 8500 Class EMU
- IÉ 8510 Class EMU
- IÉ 8520 Class EMU

==== Former ====
- IÉ 8200 Class EMU

=== Future fleet ===
IÉ's increasing fleet usage has led to requirements being made for the procurement of additional vehicles. DART services are running with all trains formed of 4–8 cars, while 54 sets of 63 fleet of ICRs are committed to services with 56 required on Friday. To this end, IÉ plans to purchase a significant number of new ICR vehicles – an initial purchase of 41 will be made for delivery in 2021, comprising three new trains, with the remainder planned as intermediate vehicles to lengthen existing units. The deal for the new vehicles is intended to include options for up to 40 further vehicles. There are also plans for a total replacement of the existing DART fleet, which will be combined with extensions to the DART network. The framework for the DART fleet is planned for up to 600 vehicles formed into four-car and eight-car sets, split into both pure EMU and BEMU trains. For immediate fleet capacity increases, IÉ planned refurbishment of its 2700 Class DMUs, which was subsequently cancelled. Instead, IÉ is discussing the possibility of sourcing surplus DMUs from the British network, with Class 170s and Class 185s available.

== See also ==
- Coaching stock of Ireland
- Diesel locomotives of Ireland
- History of rail transport in Ireland
- List of companies of Ireland
- List of railway stations in Ireland
- Multiple units of Ireland
- Transport in Ireland
