= Raheny railway station =

Railway station in Dublin, Ireland

Raheny Ráth Eanaigh
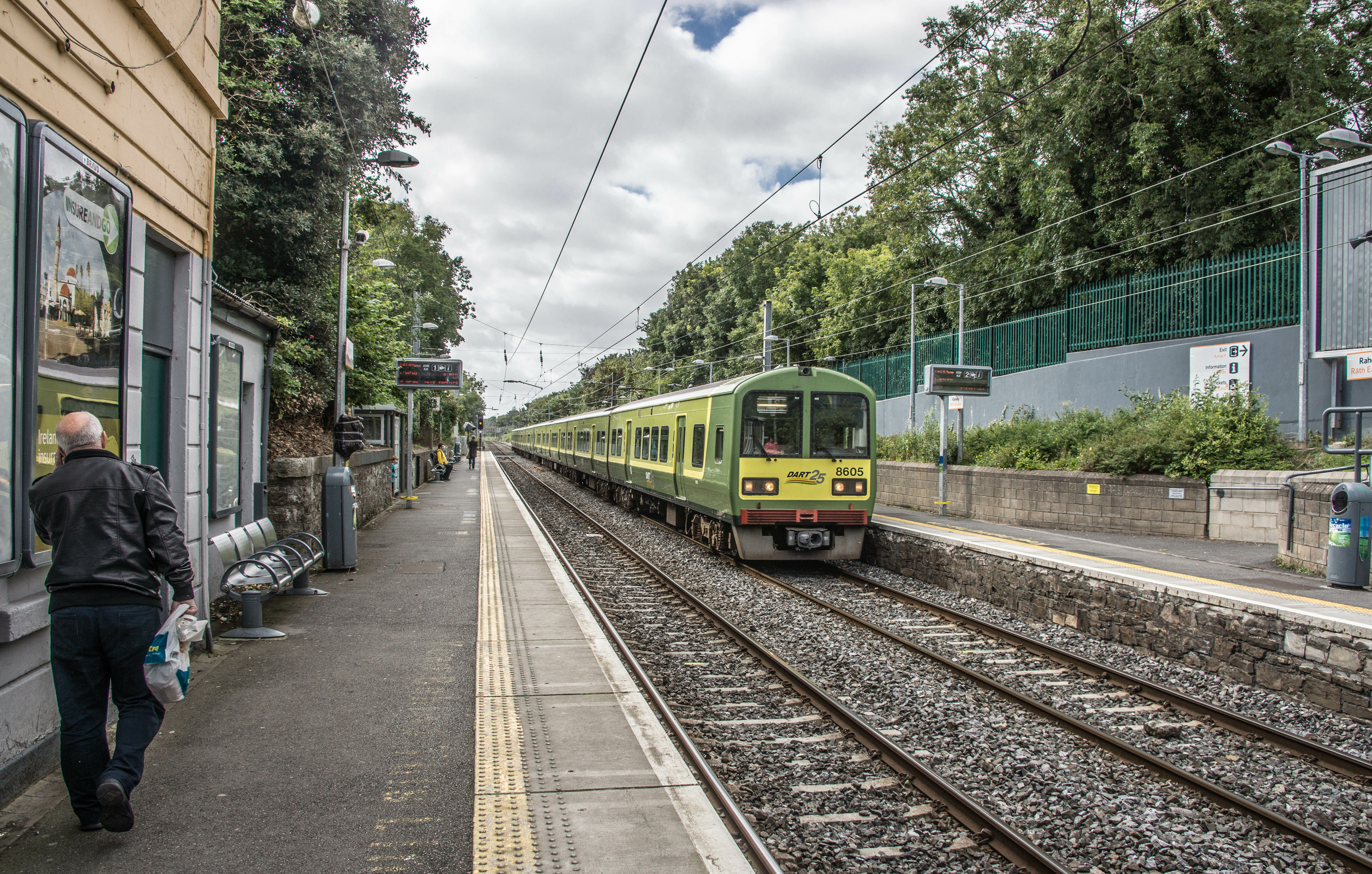

General information
- Location: Station Road, Raheny, Dublin 5 Ireland
- Coordinates: 53.3815°N 6.1767°W
- Owner: Iarnród Éireann
- Line: Belfast–Dublin line
- Platforms: 2
- Tracks: 2
- Bus operators: Dublin Bus
- Connections: 6; 29N; 31N; H1; H2; H3

Construction
- Structure type: In cutting

Other information
- Station code: RAHNY
- Fare zone: Suburban 1

History
- Opened: 25 May 1844

Services
| Preceding station | Iarnród Éireann | Following station |
|---|---|---|
| Harmonstown towards Greystones | DART | Kilbarrack towards Malahide or Howth |
Route map
Location

Raheny railway station (Irish: Ráth Eanaigh), opened at the establishment of the Dublin-Drogheda line, serves the village and core of the district of Raheny in Dublin. Parts of Raheny are also served by Harmonstown and Kilbarrack stations.

Raheny, which is a main stop on the DART suburban rail system, and an occasional stop on the Dublin-Belfast main line, was the first station north of Dublin city centre, and the station at which the opening of the main line was celebrated.

== History ==
The station opened on 25 May 1844 with the old name of Ratheny. The old station house, closed for many years, is a listed building, but when the line was completed, was the first stop for the ceremonial train, the guests disembarking for a meal at Violet Hill (Edenmore House, now St. Joseph's Hospital.) The station was built to serve the small village (back then) of Raheny. Trains often stopped there and were convenient for passengers going into the city.

As time went on, urban sprawl started to develop. Most houses in the area were built in the 1950s and 1960s. But because of closures across the rail network, the service level to the station remained the same and usage volumes did not rise. But as the 1980s came, the station was modernised with a new ticket office steps and upgraded platforms, as part of the Dublin Area Rapid Transit (DART) development. Ever since the station's service level has remained similar, with minor upgrades such as new shelters ticket machines and information screens.

== Facilities ==
The station today comprises a modern ticket office, with a bypass gate when this is closed, with a lift to the southbound platform. With a footbridge and ramp connecting the northbound platform with accessibility also. On the platforms there is space for 8 carriage trains. Along with 2 shelters on the southbound platform and 1 shelter on the northbound. On each platform there are LED and direct telephone line to the control offices in Connolly. Within the ticket office are two automatic ticket machines. The ticket office is open between 05:45-00:30, Monday to Sunday.

== Services ==
At peak times, trains operate every 10 minutes each way and every 15/20 minutes outside of those times. On Saturday the frequency is around every 15 minutes in each direction, and on Sunday every 20 minutes in each direction.

=== Connections ===
The Dublin Bus route H1 and night route 29n stop outside the station, while routes H2, H3 and 6, and the night bus 31N, use stops on the Howth Road nearby. The station is also a marked point on the Raheny Way looped walking route.

== See also ==
- List of railway stations in Ireland
