= Dunboyne railway station =

Railway station in Dunboyne, Ireland

Dunboyne Dún Búinne
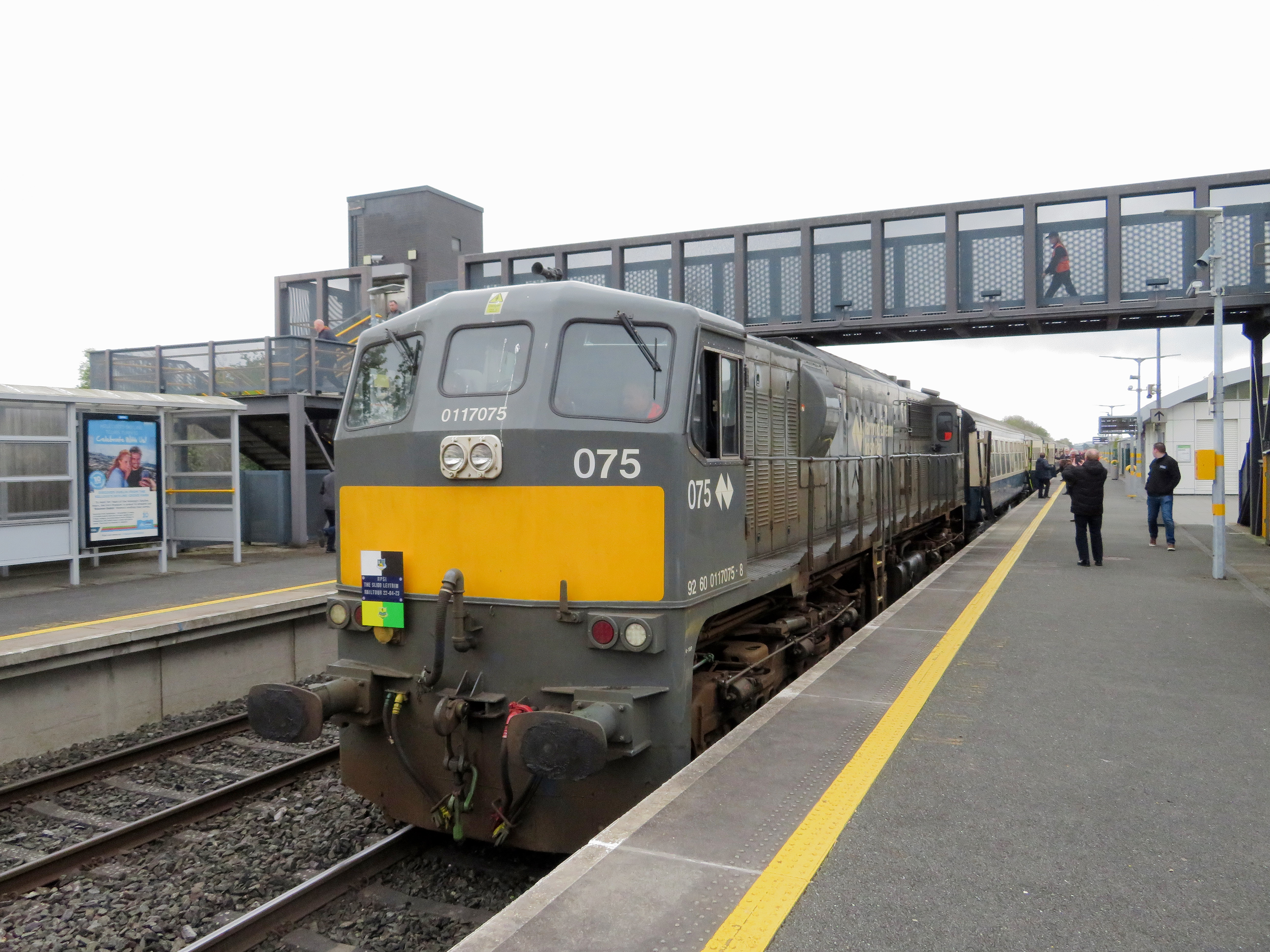
- A railtour at Dunboyne

General information
- Location: Larchfield, Dunboyne; County Meath, A86 HK07; Ireland
- Coordinates: 53°25′02.9″N 6°27′53.4″W
- Owner: Iarnród Éireann
- Operator: Iarnród Éireann
- Platforms: 2
- Tracks: 2
- Bus operators: Bus Éireann; Dublin Bus; Go-Ahead Ireland
- Connections: 70; 70D; 70N; 105; 270

Construction
- Structure type: At-grade

Other information
- Station code: DBYNE
- Fare zone: Suburban 3

Key dates
- August 1862: Station opened
- January 1947: Station closed
- September 2010: New station opened
Location

Dunboyne railway station is a railway station serving the town of Dunboyne in County Meath, Ireland.

Dunboyne station features car parking for up to 300 cars, operated by APCOA Parking, enabling it to serve as a small park & ride stop for commuters to Dublin.

== Services ==
It is a station on the Docklands to M3 Parkway commuter service (Peak Times Monday to Friday) and Clonsilla to M3 Parkway shuttle service (at all other times).

Passengers transfer at Clonsilla:

- to travel at non peak times (including Saturday and Sunday) towards Dublin city centre.
- to travel to Maynooth and both Leixlip stations. Transfer at Maynooth for InterCity services to Sligo.
- to travel to Drumcondra. Only Maynooth to Dublin services serve Drumcondra.

== History ==
The original Dunboyne station opened in August 1862 on the Clonsilla-Navan railway line, but was closed in January 1947. The old station was converted into a private residence.

In 2005 the Irish Government announced that, as part of its Transport 21 plan, the line between Clonsilla and Navan would be reopened for passenger trains in two stages, with the first stage including a new station for Dunboyne, which opened in September 2010.

The station was officially opened on 2 September 2010, and the first regularly scheduled train to the station arrived on 3 September.

== Gallery ==
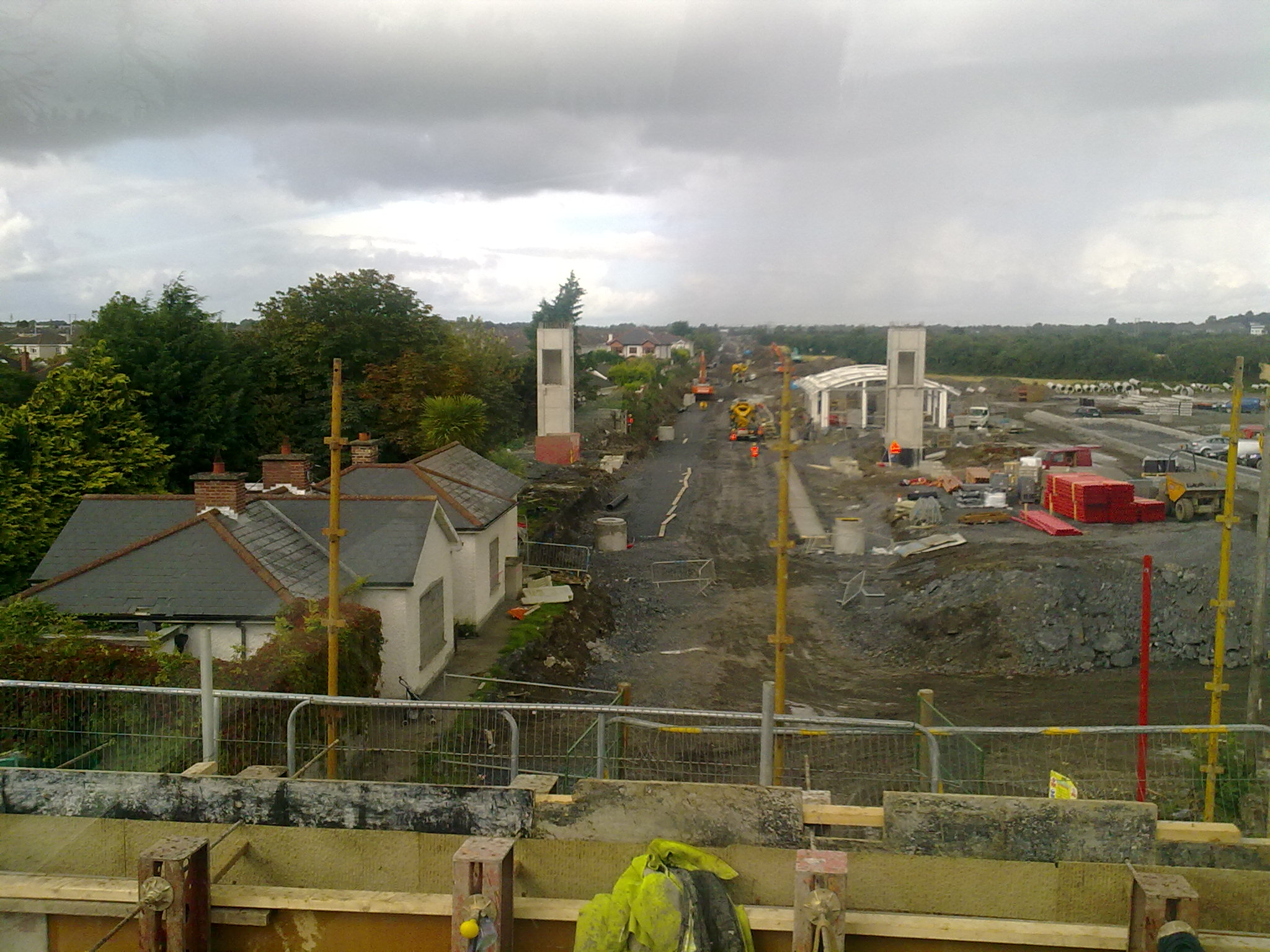
Dunboyne railway station under construction (September 2009)

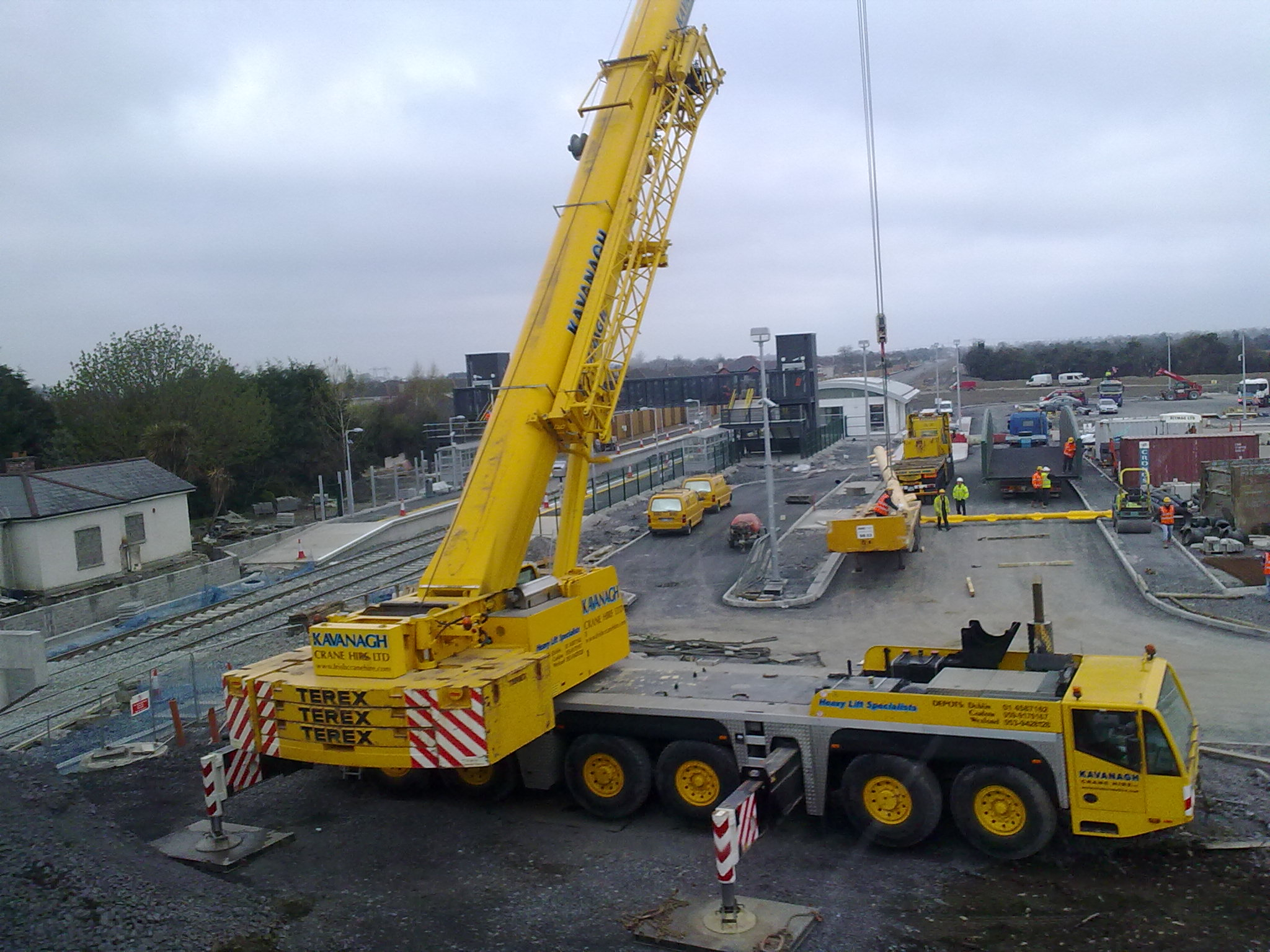
Dunboyne railway station under construction (April 2010)

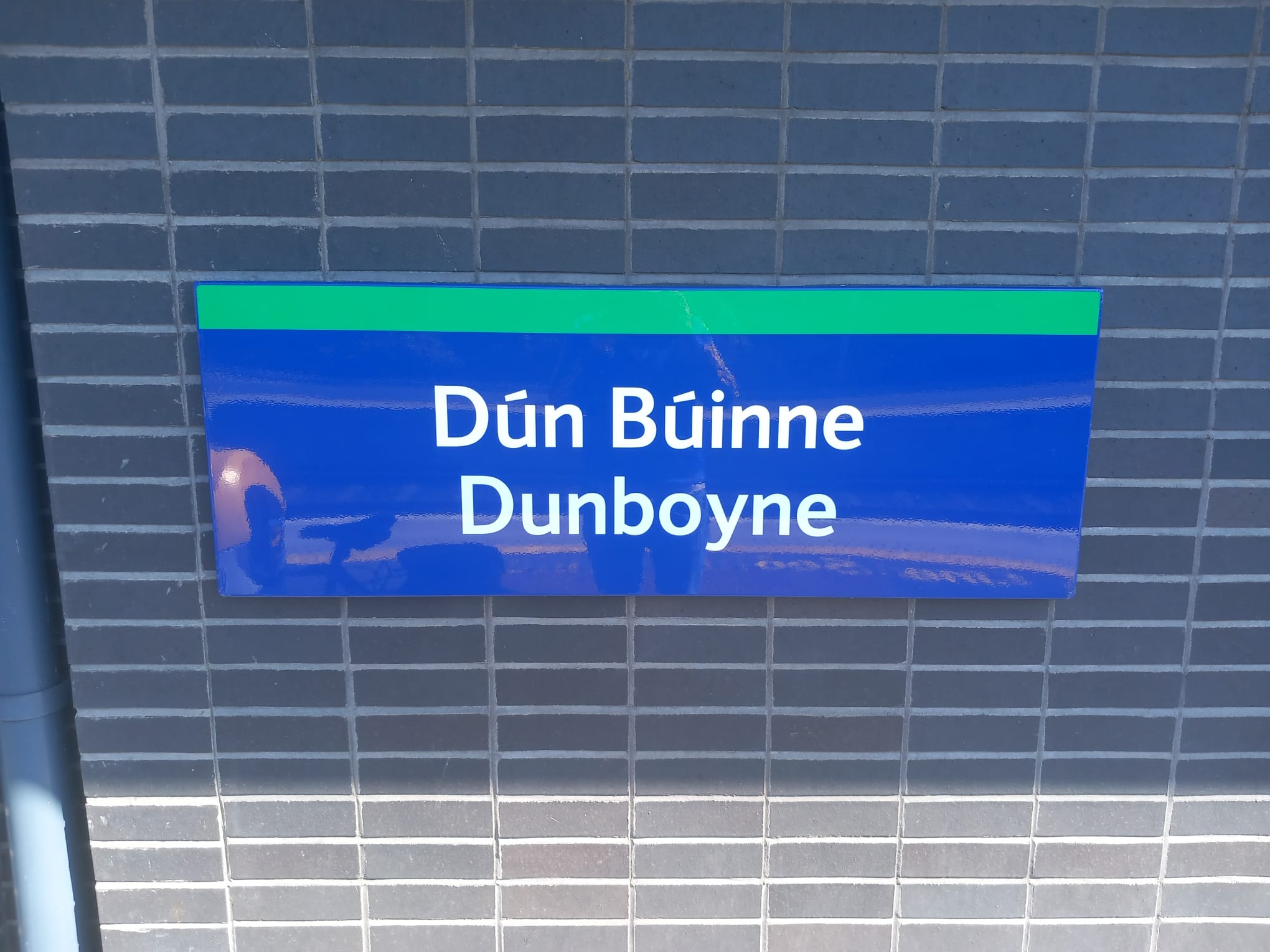
Bilingual sign in the station (2025)

== See also ==
- List of railway stations in Ireland

Preceding station	Iarnród Éireann	Following station
Hansfield	Commuter; Western Commuter (Dunboyne Branch)	M3 Parkway
	Proposed	
Hansfield	DART; Dublin-Navan railway line	M3 Parkway
