= Glenisk O'Connor Park =

Stadium in Tullamore, Co Offaly, Ireland

- Páirc Uí Chonchúir
- Location within Ireland
- Location: Tullamore, County Offaly, R35 R654, Ireland
- Coordinates: 53°16′50″N 7°29′22″W
- Owner: Offaly GAA
- Capacity: 18,000 (7,000 seated)
- Surface: Grass
- Field size: 145 x 90 m
- Public transit: Tullamore railway station High Street bus stop

Construction
- Opened: 1934
- Renovated: 2004–06
- Architect: Kiernan Structural Steel LTD

O'Connor Park (Irish: Páirc Uí Chonchúir) is a GAA stadium in Tullamore, County Offaly, Ireland. It is one of the principal grounds of the Offaly GAA Gaelic football and hurling teams. It is known for sponsorship reasons as Glenisk O’Connor Park.

The ground was opened in 1934, to replace Ballyduff Park, and currently has a capacity of 18,000.

The ground currently consists of a covered stand on one side of the pitch, with terracing on the other three. A stand was built in 1991, but replaced by the current structure in 2006. The stand (currently known as the 'New Stand' pending decision on a new name) was completed in 2006. It seats 7,000 people and also includes a press box and a special section for wheelchair users. Its 10 sections are each split horizontally with green, white and gold colour seats (the colours of Offaly GAA), with the words 'Uíbh Fhailí' (the Irish for Offaly) spelt out across the stand's white section. At the same time as the stand was being constructed, improvements were also made in the terracing on the opposite side of the pitch, allowing it to comfortably hold 8,000 people. Plans also included building new dressing rooms, toilet facilities and a TV camera room on the terrace side of the ground. Further development was due to take place on the Arden End, with hybrid terrace/seating. Underneath the main stand is a cafe that is open on matchdays.

The ground is owned by Tullamore GAA club, but was leased out by the Offaly County Board for 35 years in 2002 for use in inter-county matches.

== Naming rights ==
Period	Sponsor	Name
2017-2022	Bord na Móna	Bord na Móna O'Connor Park
2023-	Glenisk	Glenisk O'Connor Park

== See also ==
- List of Gaelic Athletic Association stadiums
- List of stadiums in Ireland by capacity
