= Clontarf Road railway station =

Railway station in Dublin, Ireland

Clontarf Road Bóthar Chluain Tarbh
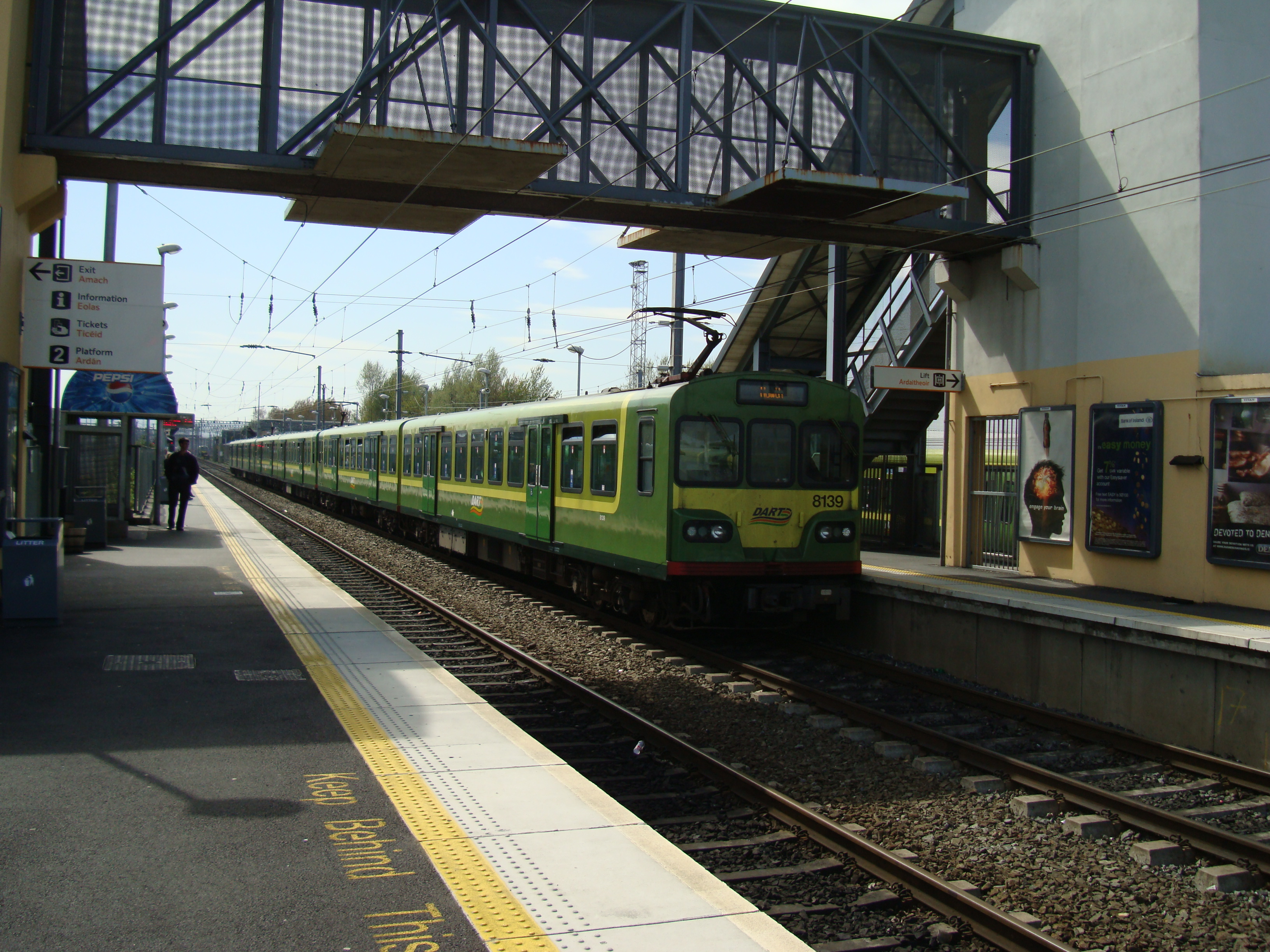
- DART 8100 Class (8139) at Clontarf Road Station in 2008

General information
- Location: Clontarf Road, Dublin 3 Ireland
- Coordinates: 53.3631°N 6.2270°W
- Owner: Iarnród Éireann
- Line: Belfast–Dublin line
- Platforms: 2
- Tracks: 3 (At Platforms); 5 (Total)
- Bus stands: 1
- Bus operators: Dublin Bus; East Point; Go-Ahead Ireland
- Connections: 31N; 32X; 104; 130; N2; N4; Eastpoint Shuttle

Construction
- Structure type: At-grade

Other information
- Station code: CTARF
- Fare zone: Suburban 1

History
- Opened: 1 September 1997

Services
Preceding station	Iarnród Éireann	Following station
Dublin Connolly towards Greystones	DART	Killester towards Malahide or Howth
Route map
Location

Clontarf Road railway station (Irish: Bóthar Chluain Tarbh) is a railway station in Dublin, Ireland, on the DART commuter rail line.

== Location ==
It is located at the south-western end of Clontarf Road on Dublin's Northside, on the border between Clontarf and Fairview, and serves people living and working in those areas, as well as Marino and East Wall. The station is situated just north of Fairview DART depot. It was built to serve the densely populated areas about, and also East Point Business Park and was opened on 1 September 1997. The station has a car park and is served by a shuttle to the East Point Business Park; it is also the terminus of the 104 bus operated by Go-Ahead Ireland (formerly by Dublin Bus, which runs hourly to DCU via Beaumont Hospital)

The ticket office is open between 05:45 to 19:45, Monday to Sunday. Part of the car park at the station is rented out to Westwood Fitness Club.

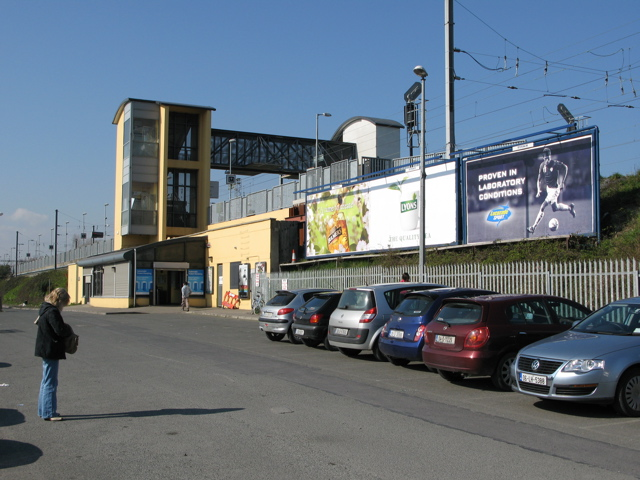
The car park at Clontarf Road Station

== Previous station for area ==
The area was last served by the old Clontarf Station, almost a half a mile (nearly 1 kilometre) north on the line. The remnants of that station can still be seen at the rail bridge over Howth Road, halfway between the start of that road and Killester village centre. This original Clontarf station was opened on 25 May 1844 and finally closed on 3 September 1956.

== See also ==
- List of railway stations in Ireland
