= Kilbarrack railway station =

Railway station in Dublin, Ireland

Kilbarrack Cill Bharróg
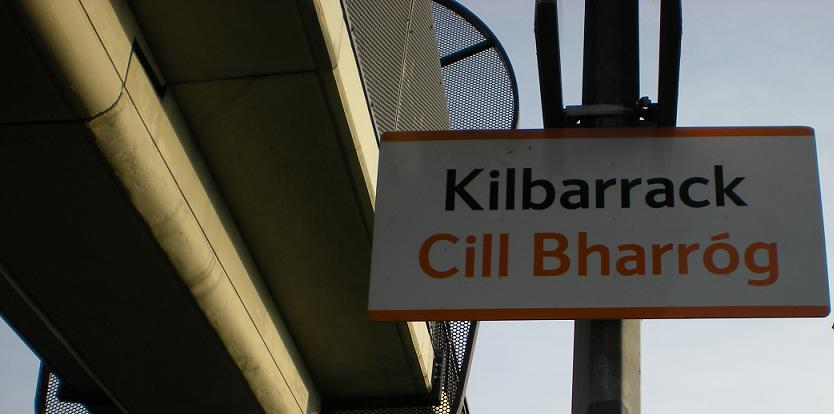

General information
- Location: Briarfield Road, Dublin 5 Ireland
- Coordinates: 53°23′13″N 6°09′42″W
- Owner: Iarnród Éireann
- Line: Belfast–Dublin line
- Platforms: 2
- Tracks: 2

Construction
- Structure type: At-grade
- Parking: No

Other information
- Station code: KBRCK
- Fare zone: Suburban 1

History
- Opened: 1 June 1969

Services
Preceding station	Iarnród Éireann	Following station
Raheny towards Greystones	DART	Howth Junction towards Malahide or Howth
Route map
Location

Kilbarrack railway station (Irish: Cill Bharróg), serves the suburb of Kilbarrack, serves Kilbarrack and parts of Raheny and Donaghmede in Dublin city, Ireland. Although on the Dublin-Belfast line, it is a stop only on the DART suburban railway system.

== History ==
The station opened on 1 June 1969 as a basic halt. In the 1980s the station was upgraded in preparation for DART services with a new station building and shelters. The station was upgraded again in 2004.

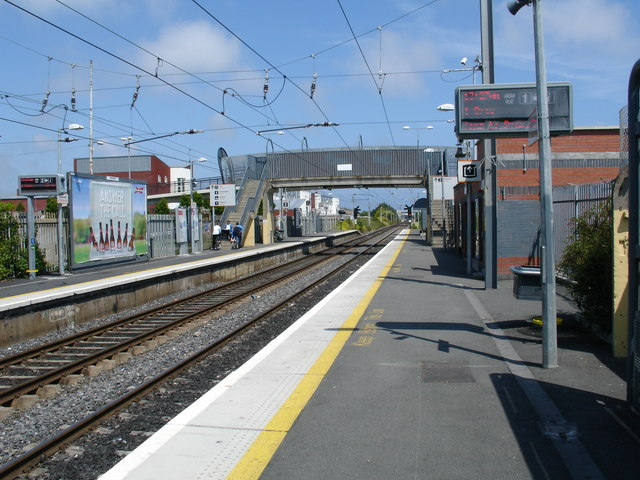
Kilbarrack Station looking up from Platform 1

== Facilities ==
Kilbarrack is a small station, with two parallel platforms and a footbridge at the top of the platforms. There is a gate at the top of the northbound platform to allow wheelchair access to the station. On the southbound platform there is a station building with ticket machines and an information office, however this remains unstaffed, Bidvest Noonan Rail Security officers are often present at the station. There are 2 shelters on each platform along with outdoor seating benches. Also there are SOS and information buttons in the station along with LED displays.

== See also ==
- List of railway stations in Ireland
