= Artaine Castle Shopping Centre =

Small suburban facility, northern Dublin, Ireland

Coordinates: 53.3834°N 6.2151°W

Artaine Castle Shopping Centre (officially Tesco Artaine Castle Shopping Centre) is a small shopping centre in Artane, Dublin, Ireland, anchored by Tesco Ireland.

== Location and name ==
The centre is located at a roundabout on Kilmore Road, close to the site of the former Artane Industrial School.

The area’s name is spelled Artane in modern times but Artaine and Tartaine were both used historically.

== History ==
The centre was built by Irish property developer Rohan. It was opened in autumn 1982, with Quinnsworth and Penneys as anchor stores, along with Lifestyle Sports and Leisure and other shops, and a total of 44200 square feet of retail space and parking for up to 400 cars. The centre was the site of what was billed as "the first Banklink Service in any store in Europe" when an ATM was installed in 1986, capable of issuing vouchers which could be used for payment in the Quinnsworth branch.

== Tenants ==
Artaine Castle's anchor stores include Tesco and Penneys. Other retailers include a hairdressers, pharmacy, post office and a bookshop. There are just under 85,000 square feet of space, 21 shops in total, and 539 parking spaces.
