= Clara railway station =

Railway station in County Offaly, Ireland

Clara Clóirtheach
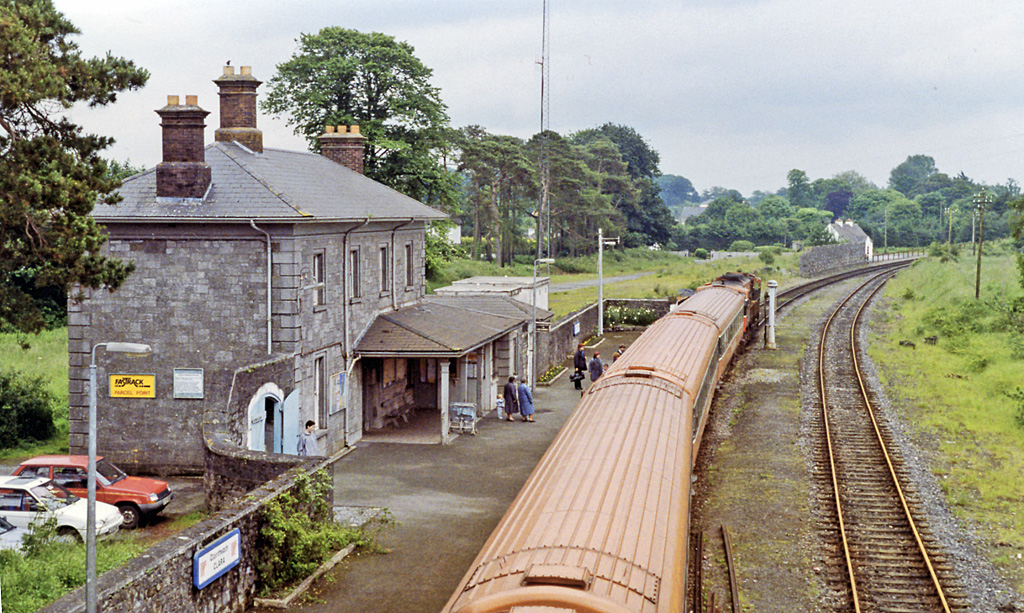

General information
- Location: Railway View, Clara; County Offaly, R35 V202; Ireland
- Coordinates: 53.339656°N 7.615668°W
- Owner: Iarnród Éireann
- Operator: Iarnród Éireann
- Platforms: 1
- Tracks: 2
- Bus operators: TFI Local Link
- Connections: 840

Construction
- Structure type: At-grade

Other information
- Station code: CLARA
- Fare zone: H

Key dates
- 1859: Station opened

Passengers
- 81,532
Location

Clara railway station serves the town of Clara in County Offaly.

The station lies on the Dublin to Galway and Dublin to Westport or Ballina line.

== History ==
The station opened on 3 October 1859.

Branch Line Origins:

The Portarlington to Athlone railway was only a branch line up until the mid-1970s and there were several further spur lines emanating from Clara.

Clara to Streamstown Railway:

Clara was once a railway junction, it had a spur to Streamstown on the now disused Athlone–Mullingar link.

In 1895, according to the Bradshaw's Guide (page 600 of the 1895 guide), there were 4 trains per weekday from Clara to Streamstown and 5 in the opposite direction, with the journey taking between 20 and 29 minutes.

Clara to Banagher Railway Off-Shoot:

Another such spur to the branch-line, was the Clara to Banagher railway. This served Ferbane, and the Cloghan and Belmont railway station before terminating in Banagher, near where the Banagher Marina is today. In 1920, according to the 1920 Bradshaw's Guide (page 705) there were two passenger trains per day in each direction via steam train with the journey taking 43 minutes. There were no weekend services.

Today all these areas are served by the 840 Local Link bus with 6x daily return services while also serving the additional communities of Ballycumber and Pullough with a drop-off location in the middle of Banagher town as opposed to a 9-minute walk from the location of the railway station to the centre of the town.

Limited Service Patterns:

In 1920 there was also a twice daily (no service during weekends) offering between Dublin Heuston (then Kingsbridge Station) with journey times varying between 1 hour 59 minutes and 2 hours and 14 minutes. Heading west, the service would terminate after crossing the Shannon in Athlone's Roscommon-based station.

While the Portarlington to Athlone railway continued to remain a branch line and there were still only two daily return trains between Clara and Dublin Heuston, journey times had improved to 1 hour 45 minutes by 1971 as per the CIE timetable.

National Historical Context:

In 1971 there were 10.3m passenger journeys per year in Ireland compared to 50.7m in 2024. While 4 trains per day is very low compared to 2025's 25, it is worth noting that there were only 94 daily train services on the entire Ireland rail network in 1972. Trains serving Clara thus represented over 4% of all trains nationally. In 2025 there are close to 900 daily trains during weekdays.

Mainline Promotion:

By 1975 the Portarlington to Athlone line had been promoted to the current mainline and Clara then received 5 daily return services with journey times being reduced to as little as 89 minutes. You could also now go directly to Galway for the first time via regularly scheduled passenger services.

== Present day ==
In 2025, the fastest services take 59 minutes between Heuston and Clara.

It's 176m platform length can accommodate 22000 consists of up to 7 railcars long.

== Future plans ==
As of the 2025 Rail Project Priorisation Strategy for the 2050 All-Island Strategic Rail Review, Clara, along with Woodlawn, is expected to receive a second platform, overhead bridge and lift as part of early interventions on the Galway rail line between 2025 and 2030. This will lead to more frequent services for Clara passengers and improved "scheduling flexibility".

The Rail Project Priorisation Strategy deals with large projects over €200m in value between 2025 and 2040, or in other words, the first 15 years, as set out by the All-Ireland Strategic Rail Review with its 2050 timeline.

== Accidents and incidents ==
- On 9 March 2019, a woman was seriously injured after walking into a train to Westport near the station after trespassing on the line. Services were suspended for a few hours as a result.

== See also ==
- List of railway stations in Ireland

Preceding station	Iarnród Éireann	Following station
Tullamore	InterCity; Dublin-Westport/Galway railway line	Athlone
Tullamore	InterCity; Dublin-Westport/Galway railway line	Athlone
