= Artane, Dublin =

Northside suburb of Dublin, Ireland

Artane Ard Aidhin (Irish)
- Suburb
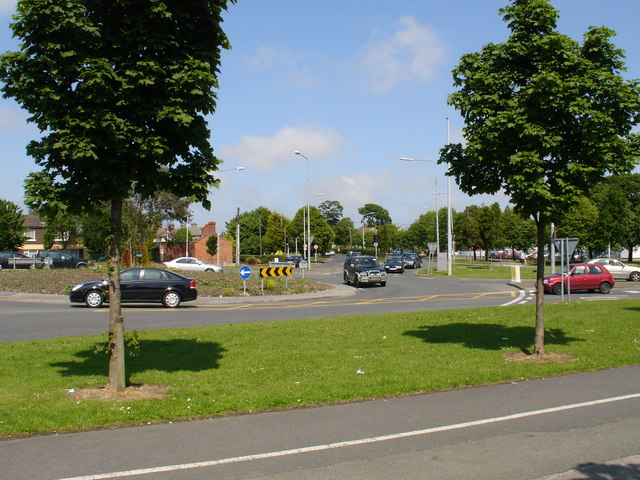
- Roundabout in Artane
- Interactive map of Artane
- Location in Ireland
- Coordinates: 53°22′58″N 6°11′42″W
- Country: Ireland
- Province: Leinster
- County: County Dublin
- Local authority: Dublin City Council

Government
  - Dáil Éireann: Dublin Bay North
  - EU Parliament: Dublin

Area
  - Suburb: 3.86 km^{2} (1.49 sq mi)

Population (2006)
  - Urban: 36,564
- (Local election areas)
- Time zone: UTC+0 (WET)
  - Summer (DST): UTC-1 (IST (WEST))
- Eircode routing key: D05
- Area code: 01, +353 1
- Irish Grid Reference: O176375

Artane, sometimes spelt Artaine (Irish: Ard Aidhin), (Note: Multiple bases are found in multiple sources (which include {Dublin, 1984 – Wren, Jimmy: The Villages of Dublin}), including: Ard Tain, The Height of the Flocks; Ard Aidhean, Aidhean's Height; Ard In, The Little Height) historically Tartaine is a northside suburb of Dublin, Ireland.

Artane is also a civil parish in the ancient barony of Coolock. Neighbouring districts include Kilmore West, Coolock, Beaumont, Killester, Raheny and Clontarf; to the south is a small locality, Harmonstown, straddling the Raheny-Artane border.

== History ==
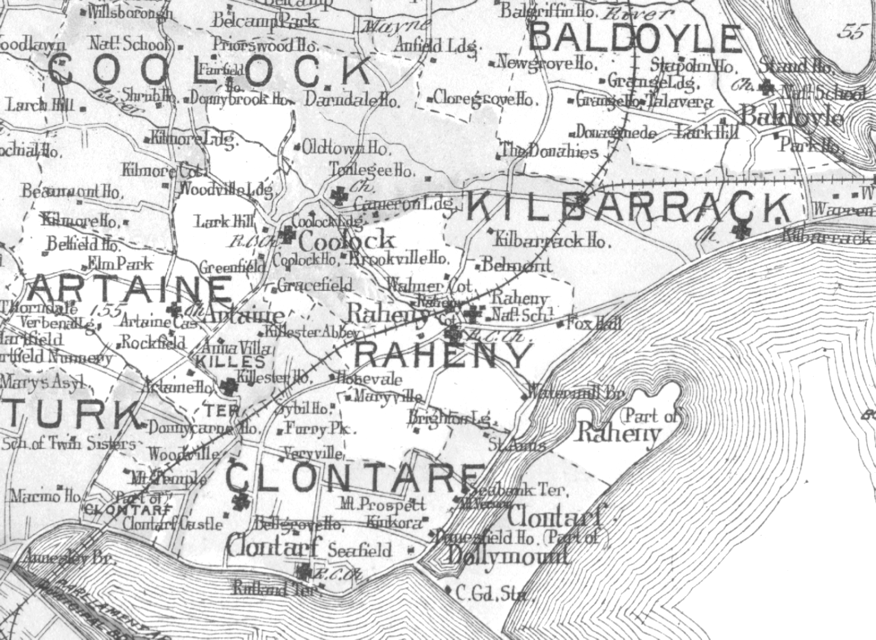
North eastern Dublin city, including Artaine, 1901

Artaine, now usually Artane, has a recorded history spanning over 900 years, but for much of that time was a quiet rural area.

Artane, as described from Thom's Almanac and Official Directory: County Dublin Directory, in 1862: "A village and parish in Coolock barony, Dublin county, three miles (5 km) N. from the General Post Office, Dublin, comprising an area of 954 acres (3.86 km^{2}). Population, 457. The village is on the road to Malahide. The parish, anciently called "Tartaine," for centuries formed part of the estate of the Hollywood family, and the castle of Artane likewise belonged to that of the Donnellans. The ruins were taken down in 1825, and on its site, Artane House was erected".

Artane Castle is recorded from about 1360 when Robert de Holywood, Chief Baron of the Irish Exchequer and founder of the Hollywood family, purchased it. The family remained at Artane for centuries.

The civil parish of Artaine, linked with Finglas before the Reformation, comprises the townlands of Artaine North, Artaine South, Artaine West, Artaine East (originally Skillinglass), Puckstown (where Bram Stoker once resided with his family, in Artane Lodge on Puckstown Lane) and two-thirds of the townland of Oldtown (the remainder being in the civil parish of Coolock).

Artane Cottages Lower and Upper, built circa 1900, on the Malahide Road, are in the townland of Killester North.

=== Silken Thomas and Artane Castle ===
In 1534, when Silken Thomas appeared in Dublin, the citizens, feeling unable to defend the city, allowed his troops to enter and lay siege to Dublin Castle. Among those who had taken refuge in the Castle was John Alen, Archbishop of Dublin. He had incurred the enmity of the FitzGeralds (also known as the Geraldines) by zeal in promoting Wolsey's plans and now dreaded their vengeance. He tried to escape by sea, but his ship was driven ashore at Clontarf. He sought refuge at Artane Castle, the home of his friend and fellow councillor Thomas St. Lawrence: St. Lawrence willingly took him in, but his hiding place was betrayed and he was captured. When brought before Silken Thomas, he implored the Earl to spare his life, but the young lord turned away with contempt, saying "Beir uaim an bodach" ("take the fellow away"). These words were interpreted as an order to put him to death and he was murdered in cold blood. For this crime, Silken Thomas was excommunicated by the Pope and thus lost many of his adherents. A slab bearing his name is still to be seen in the Archbishop's cemetery. In this old cemetery, there is also the 18th-century tomb of Richard Hollywood of Elm Park and the ruins of the 13th-century parish church, dedicated to St. Nicholas, it was a Chapel of the Medieval Finglas Church, the church was alter transferred to Coolock parish.

Artane Castle was used as a garrison during the 1641 Rebellion for a small army under the command of Luke Netterville of Corballis. The army raided two vessels at Clontarf led by the Commander of the Garrison of Dublin, Sir Charles Coote. They then battled in an area called Bloody Hallow, south of Swords. The Castle was pulled down in 1825 and using material from the castle a house was built on the site by Matthew Boyle. Boyle was a wealthy linen merchant which a business on Mary Street.

=== Artane Industrial School ===
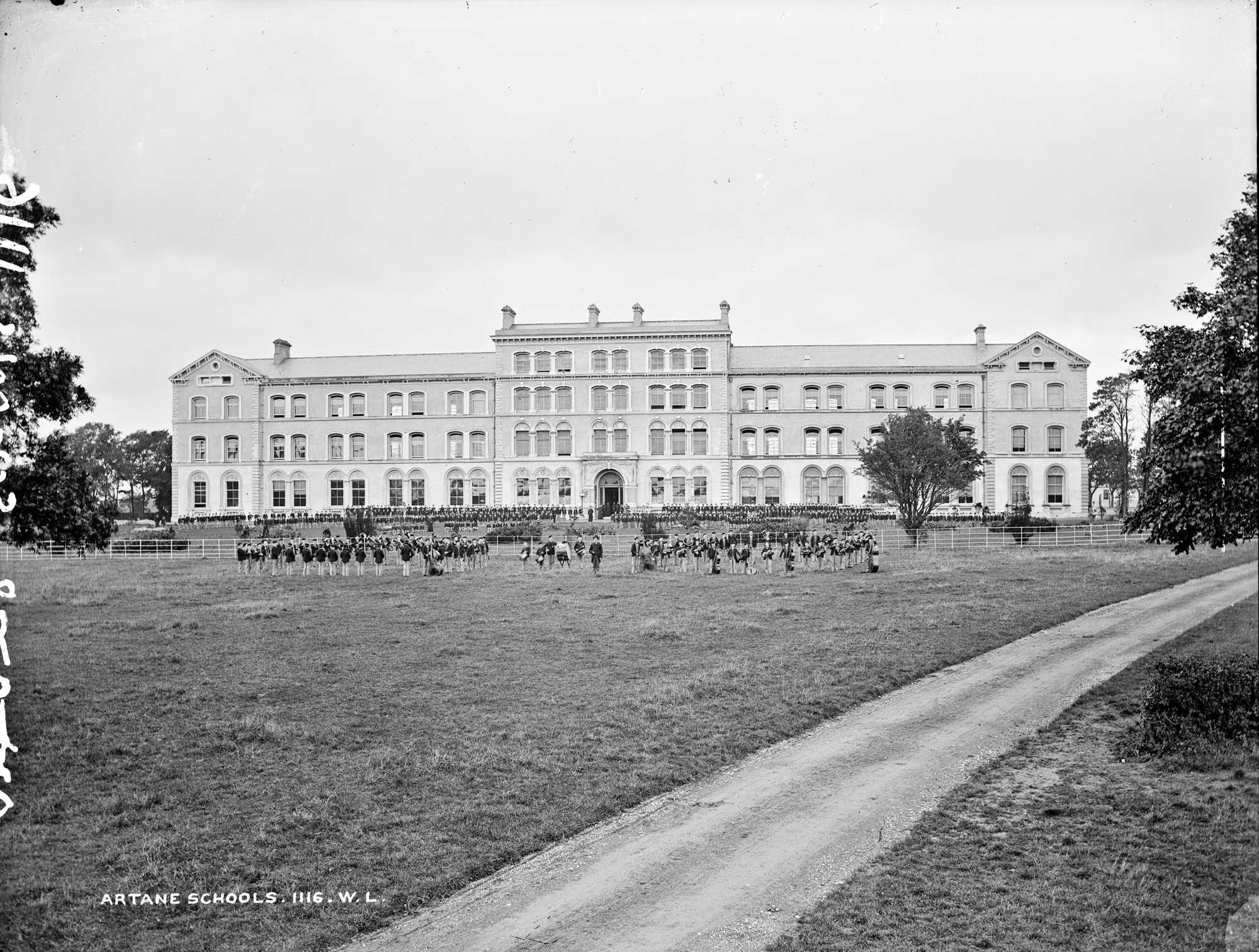
Artane Industrial School c. 1900

The Artane Industrial School was set up in 1871 in Artane House by the Congregation of Christian Brothers. Industrial Schools were established to take in orphaned or abandoned boys or those who were involved in petty crime, and even such a minor offence as skipping school could be enough for a boy to be sent there. It has been said that about 5% of the children in Artane, indeed in all Industrial Schools, were actually orphans. Most of the incarcerated children were from families that had broken down and as separation was not allowed either, the children of these broken marriages were incarcerated and the religious institution in whose charge the children were put were paid one-third of a labourer's wage to feed, educate and clothe each child. In today's money, this would be equal to about €120 per child per week.

The school housed around 900 boys at any one time and they stayed there until they were 16 years of age. More than 15,000 youngsters passed through the gates of the school from 1871 to its closure in 1966. Subsequently, many allegations of abuse of boys at the school emerged.

==== After the industrial school - St. David's Primary and Secondary School ====
St. David's Primary School, BNS, began operations on the lower floors of the old industrial school in 1969. St. David's Secondary School, CBS, moved into the upper floors of the industrial school building in 1974 from the pre-fabricated buildings on Kilmore Road which it had occupied since 1966. The school building today is solely St. David's Secondary School, with grass playing fields, an all-weather pitch, sports hall, and exercise room, among its sports facilities, also science labs, computer rooms, metalwork and wood workrooms, art and a music room. St. David's CBS won the Leinster Colleges Senior Football Championship in 1986. They had been runners-up in 1984.

=== The Stardust ===
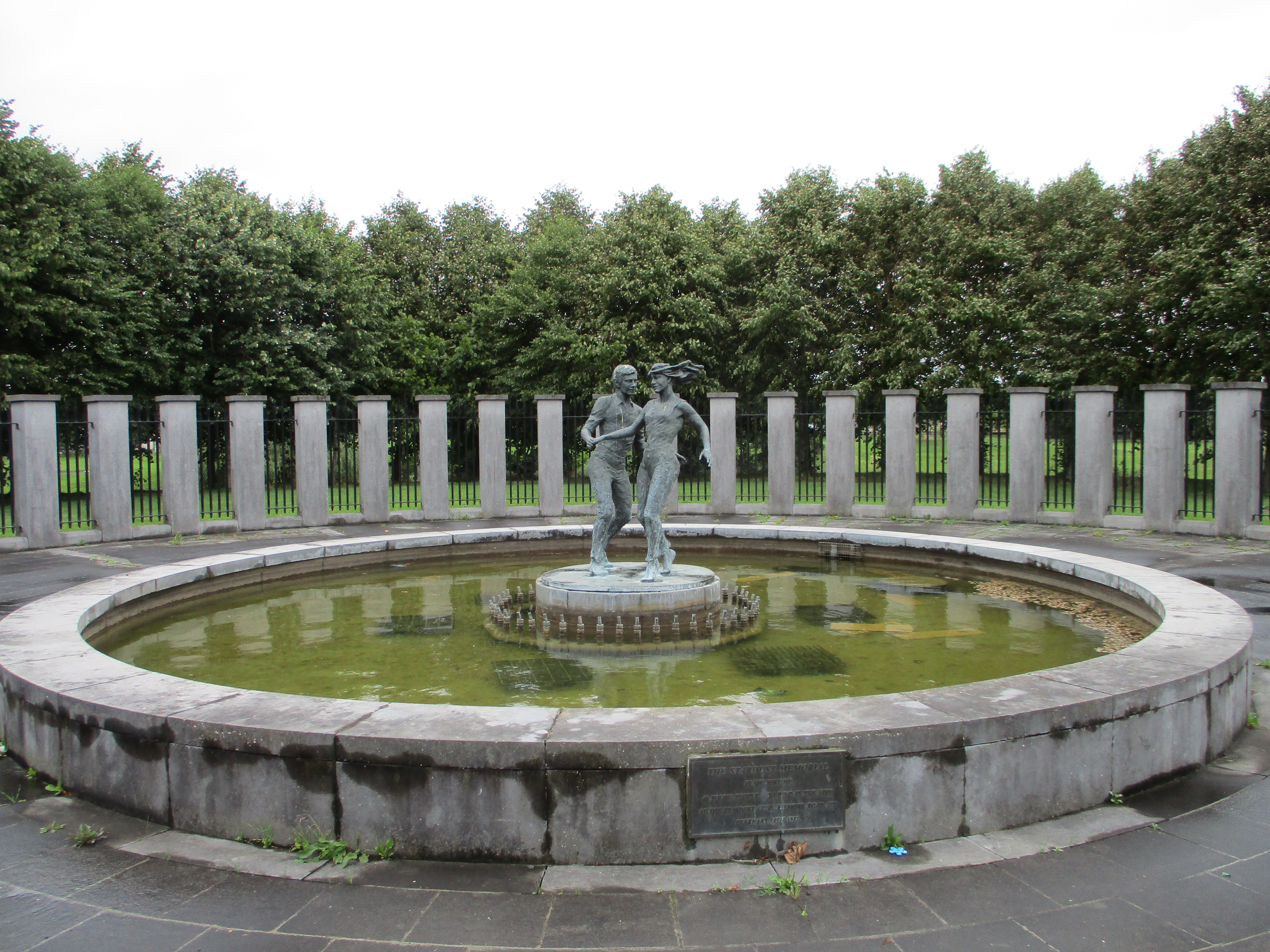
Dancing Couple memorial in Stardust Memorial Park

The Stardust was a popular nightclub located near the Artane end of Kilmore Road leading from Artane to Coolock. In the early hours of 14 February 1981, a fire took place at a disco. Forty-eight people lost their lives and 214 were injured. More than 800 people had attended the disco that night. The site of the disaster is today a business park which houses (amongst other things) a pub, opposite Artane Castle Shopping Centre. On the site was originally the factory of Scotts Foods, making jams and jarred vegetables.

On 14 November 2008, a second fire occurred at the same site as the Stardust, which had been used as a children's play centre. However, no one was in the building at the time, and there were no injuries. Once the fire was put out, firefighters found cancer-causing asbestos hanging from the roof.

=== Scoil Chaitríona fire ===
On 16 October 2019, Scoil Chaitríona Cailíní, a primary school in Artane, was severely damaged in a fire. The fire caused a significant amount of damage to several classrooms and the school's roof. There was one injury reported and the cause was deemed accidental. The school was closed for around two weeks before the pupils could safety return to the school. During that period, the school's pupils were relocated to temporary classrooms.

== Amenities ==
Retail facilities in the Artane area include several shops on the Malahide Road, as well as the Artaine Castle Shopping Centre, which is anchored by Tesco. Butterly Business Park holds a Lidl, a Mr Price and a number of other retailers.

Artane Beaumont Family Recreation Centre (A.B.F.R.C) is situated on the Kilmore Road at the Skellys Lane junction; Artane Montessori Circle Preschool is based at the recreation centre, which also hosts an after-school club for children of local schools, while other activities include basketball, badminton, fitness classes, Zumba and weight watchers; a number of music groups also use the centre.

Artane is also the site of the Coolock-Artane Credit Union main office, and the Donnycarney-Beaumont Credit Union, located in Artane Castle Shopping Centre.

Artane Beaumont Football Club is based at Rockfield Park, as is Rockfield Tennis Club. St. Pauls Artane F.C.is located at Gracefield Avenue. Killester Basketball Club uses the facilities at St. David's CBS, Artane.

== Education ==
Schools in Artane include St. David's CBS and St. David's Boys National School, as well as St. John of God Girls National School on Kilmore Road.

== Religion ==
Artane is a parish in the Fingal South East deanery of the Roman Catholic Archdiocese of Dublin. There are two Roman Catholic churches serving the area: Our Lady of Mercy, Brookwood Grove (Artane parish), and St John Vianney, Ardlea Road (Ardlea parish). The Serbian Orthodox Church Parish of Saint George uses Artane's Oratory of the Resurrection, Kilmore Road, for its services. Designed by the architect Liam McCormick the oratory contains stained glass windows by the artist Ruth Brandt. Artane is part of the Coolock, Church of Ireland Parish.

== Public transport ==
=== Dublin Bus ===
The area is served by a number of Dublin Bus routes, including: 14, 15, 27, 27A, 27B, 27X, 42, 43, 104. The Artane roundabout bus stop is nearly always occupied by passengers.

=== DART ===
Artane is close to two Dublin Area Rapid Transit (DART) stations: Harmonstown railway station, which divides Artane and Harmonstown, and Killester railway station.

== Notable people ==
- Jason Barry, actor in Titanic and Love/Hate
- Ivan Beshoff, survivor of Russian battleship Potemkin lived in Artane, where he founded the Beshoff's chain of fish and chip shops.
- Stephen Cluxton, Gaelic footballer, attended St David's CBS in Artane.
- Liam Cunningham, actor, was educated at St David's CBS.
- Robert de Holywood, founder of the Hollywood family and Chief Baron of the Irish Exchequer (died 1384).
- Johannes de Sacrobosco, known locally as John de Hollywood (1195–1256), is believed to have come from Artane.
- Kevin Doherty, ex-footballer and former first team manager of Shelbourne FC, was born here.
- Enya and her managers Nicky Ryan and wife Roma Ryan, who is also her lyricist, lived on Danieli Drive for a period.
- Brendan Gleeson, actor, born and grew up here.
- Veronica Guerin (1958–1996), Irish crime reporter, murdered during the course of an investigation.
- Jeff Hendrick, footballer with Newcastle United F.C and the Irish national team, grew up in Artane.
- Tom Kettle (1880–1916), writer, barrister, economist, Irish Nationalist politician, and World War I volunteer (KIA), was born here.
- Paul Kimmage, ex-professional cyclist and award-winning journalist, grew up in Artane.
- Des McAleenan, goalkeeping coach, grew up in Artane.
- Brian McFadden, singer/musician, was born and grew up here.
- Larry Mullen, drummer with the Irish band U2, was a member of the Artane Boy's Band.
- Ray Shah, ex-Big Brother star and later TV/radio presenter, went to school in St David's NBS & CBS, Artane.
- Peter Snow, BBC TV presenter
- Frank Stapleton, footballer
- Bram Stoker, author who was born in Clontarf, lived in Artane Lodge during the 1850s. His brother George was born in Artane.
- Willie Walsh, former Aer Lingus and British Airways CEO, was born near Artane.

== See also ==
- List of towns and villages in the Republic of Ireland
