= Killester railway station =

Station on the DART line, Dublin, Ireland

Killester Cill Easra
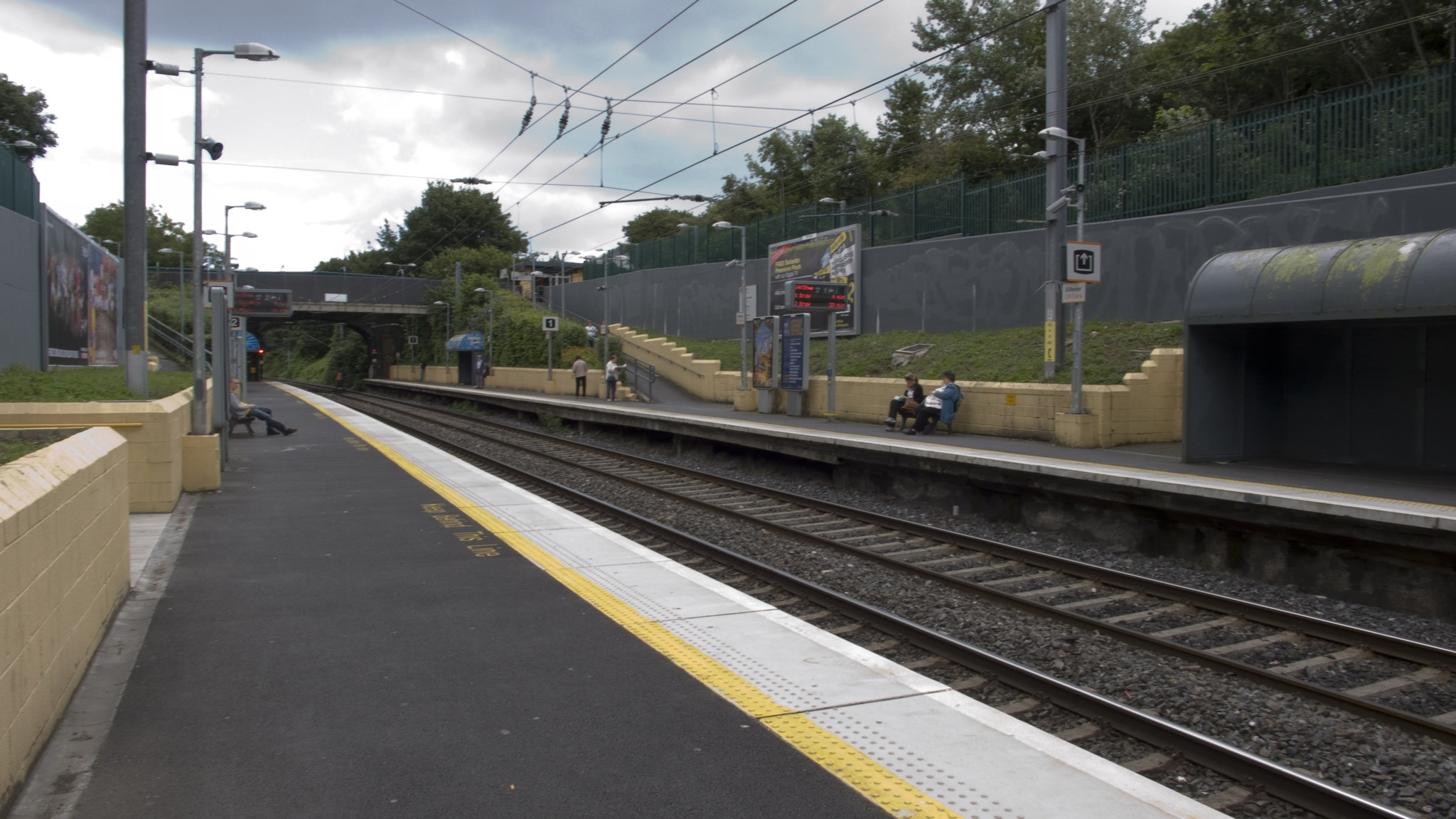

General information
- Location: Middle Third, Dublin 5 Ireland
- Coordinates: 53°22′22″N 6°12′18″W
- Owner: Iarnród Éireann
- Platforms: 2
- Tracks: 2
- Bus operators: Dublin Bus; Go-Ahead Ireland
- Connections: 6; 104; H1; H2; H3; N4

Construction
- Structure type: In cutting

Other information
- Station code: KLSTR
- Fare zone: Suburban 1

History
- Opened: 1 October 1845

Key dates
- 1847: Station closed
- 1923: Station reopens

Services
Preceding station	Iarnród Éireann	Following station
Clontarf Road towards Greystones	DART	Harmonstown towards Malahide or Howth
Route map
Location

Killester railway station (Irish: Cill Easra) serves the suburbs of Killester and Donnycarney, as well as parts of Artane, in Dublin.

== History ==
The original station opened on 1 October 1845 but closed after two years, re-opening on a new site about 200 m (656 ft) further north in 1923.

The ticket office is open between 5:45 AM to 7:45 PM, Monday to Sunday.

== See also ==
- List of railway stations in Ireland
