= Corr Castle =

Tower house in Sutton, Dublin

- Caisleán an Chorraigh
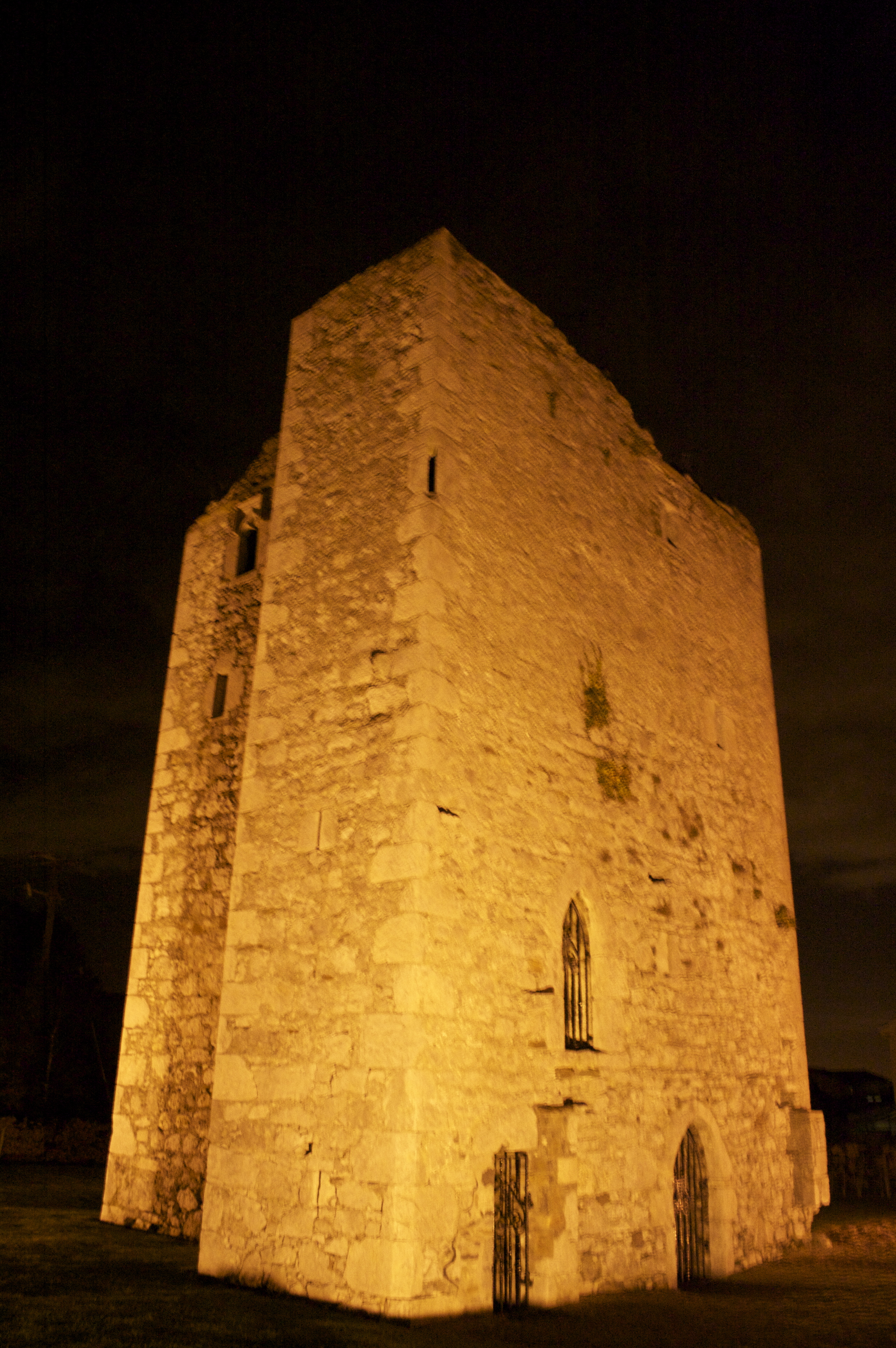
- The tower house at night

- Location within Dublin

General information
- Status: Protected Structure (RPS: 0551); RMP: DU015-025
- Type: 15th century castle – tower house
- Location: Sutton, Dublin, Ireland
- Coordinates: 53°23′24″N 6°05′39″W
- Current tenants: Vacant
- Renovated: partially in the early 2000s

Technical details
- Material: coursed masonry with dressed limestone quoins
- Floor count: 4 storey

Corr Castle (Irish: Caisleán an Chorraigh – Castle of the round hill) is an L-plan tower house likely constructed sometime in the fifteenth century in Sutton, Dublin. The castle lies within the boundaries of Howth Demesne in the old townland of Correston, close to the townlands of Quarry and Burrow. The castle was probably built on higher ground in order to guard the isthmus at Sutton which was the only route on land to access Howth Castle and the port of Howth. It has historically sometimes been called The Dane's castle.

== History ==
It appears that the area surrounding the castle was inhabited by the Cornwalsh family of Welsh origin in medieval times with the nearby hill and their Welsh origin giving them their name. It is unknown whether the Cornwalsh family, the later White family or another party actually constructed the castle.

The castle was definitively owned by the Whites of St. Catherine in the mid 16th century but passed to Christopher St Lawrence, 8th Baron Howth in 1579 and may have been improved and upgraded at that time.

The castle can be seen clearly on the Down Survey map of North Dublin from 1655.

It was later used as a grandstand and feature on the Howth Park Racecourse (1829–1842) by the 30th Lord of Howth. The racecourse circuit ran from near Howth Castle and circled Corr Castle by the Burrow Road. The Lord of Howth's black and white racing colours were later adopted by Howth Celtic Football Club upon establishment of the club on part of the Howth Castle grounds in 1962.

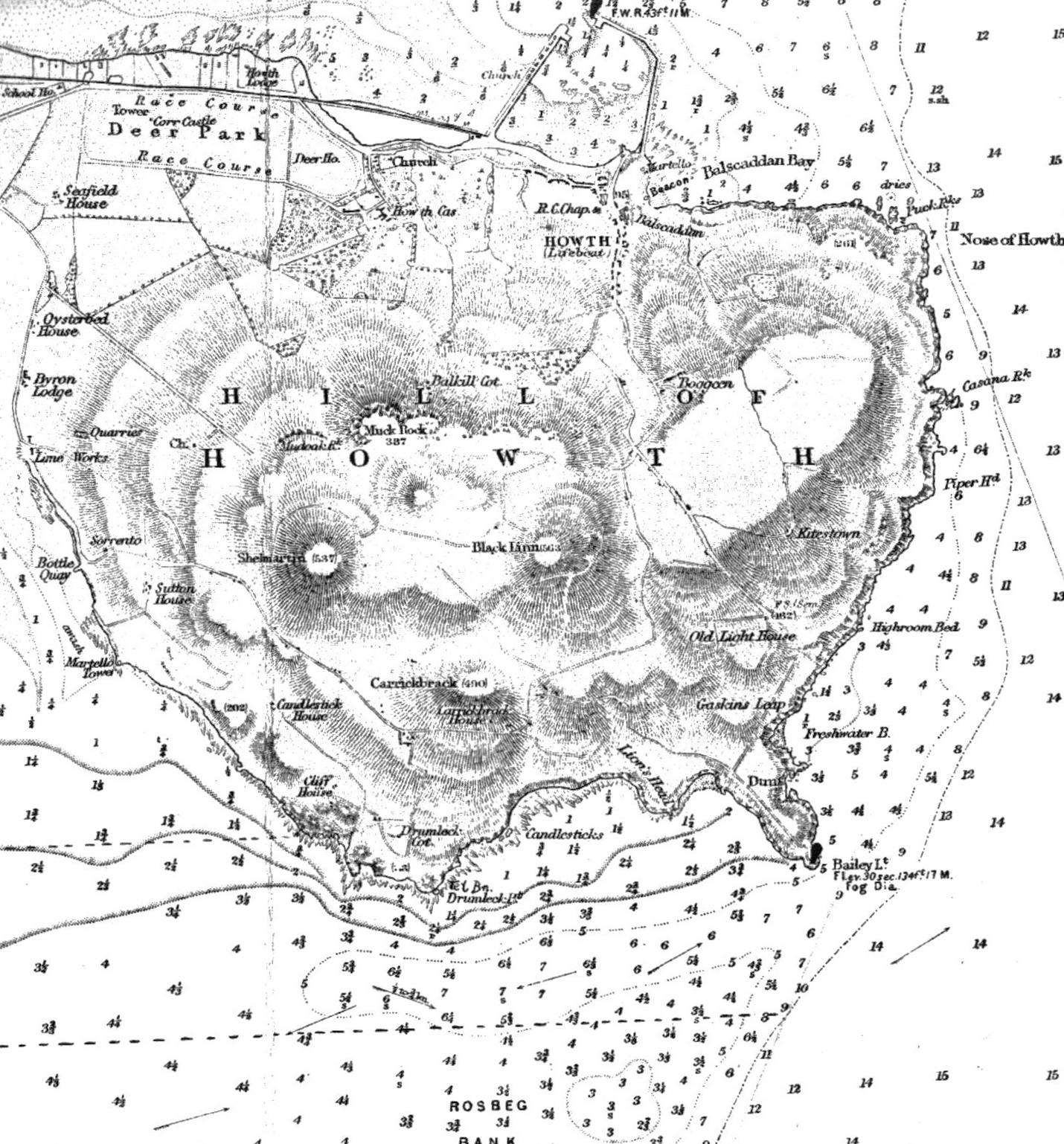
1875 Map of Howth Head showing the layout of Howth Park Racecourse with Corr Castle pinpointed inside the course boundaries

The area around the castle was used as a quarry for much of the late 19th and early 20th century with the tower and out buildings along with a windmill water-pump some of the few structures left standing in the immediate area. More substantial remains of the castle can clearly be seen in photos taken by Francis Browne SJ in the 1930s which appear to show part of external castle walls or a bawn. (Note: Photos 3.2.6 to 3.2.30 in the Father Browne collection)

After being partially restored in the early 2000s, the castle is now secured and sits within a private apartment complex as an architectural feature although it still can be clearly viewed from the nearby Howth Road.

== Status and Features ==
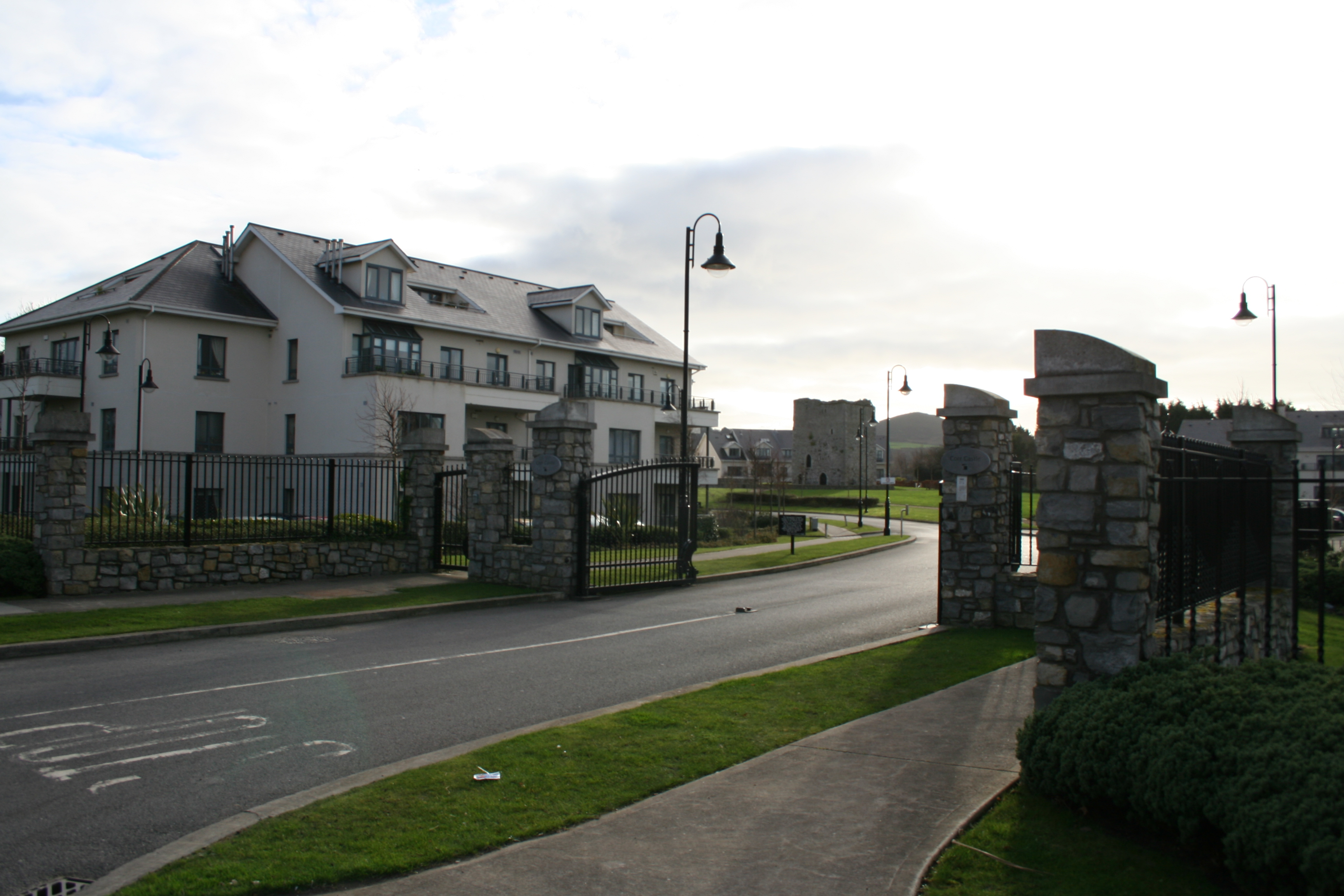
Corr Castle as seen from the Howth Road

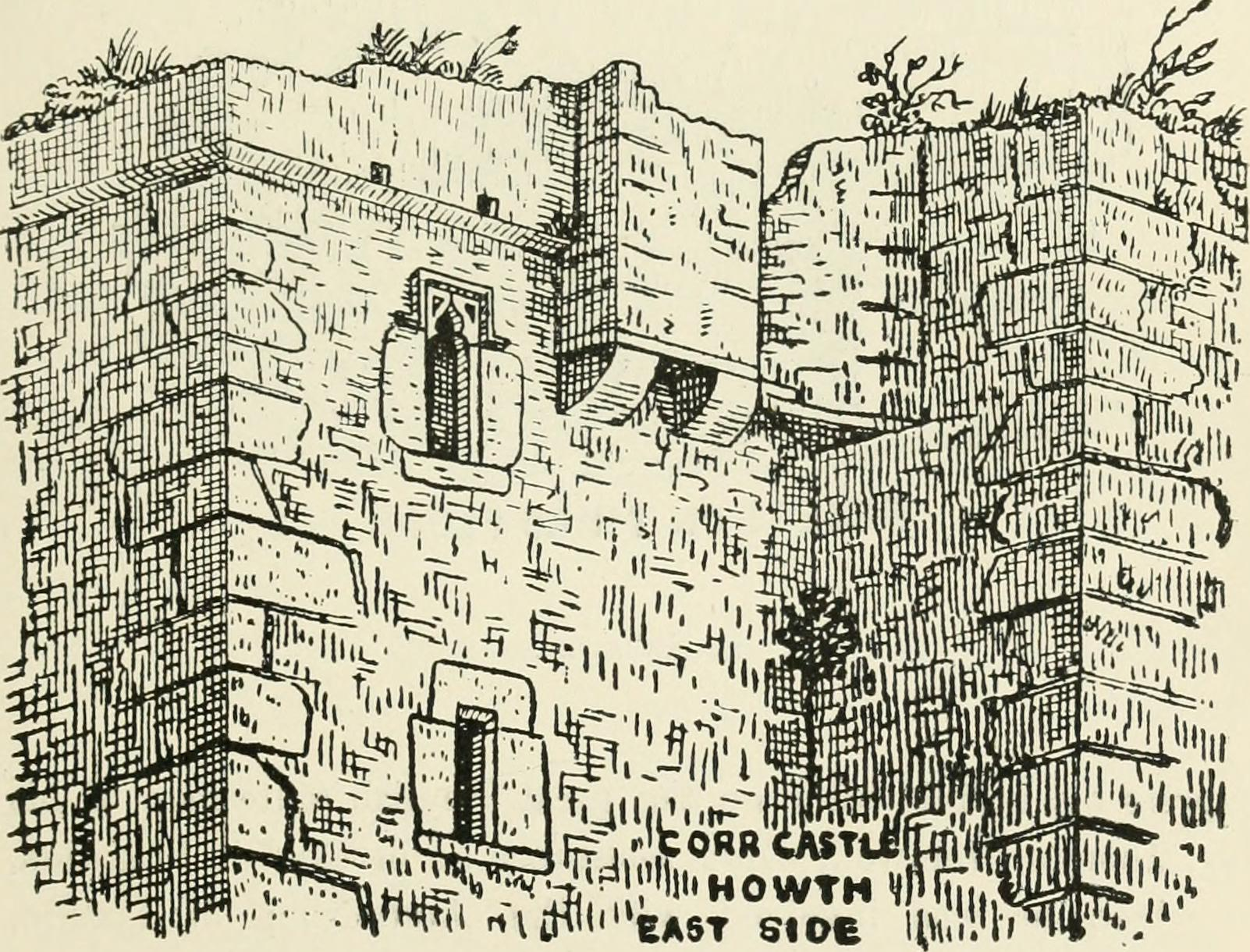
East side of Corr Castle showing machicolations

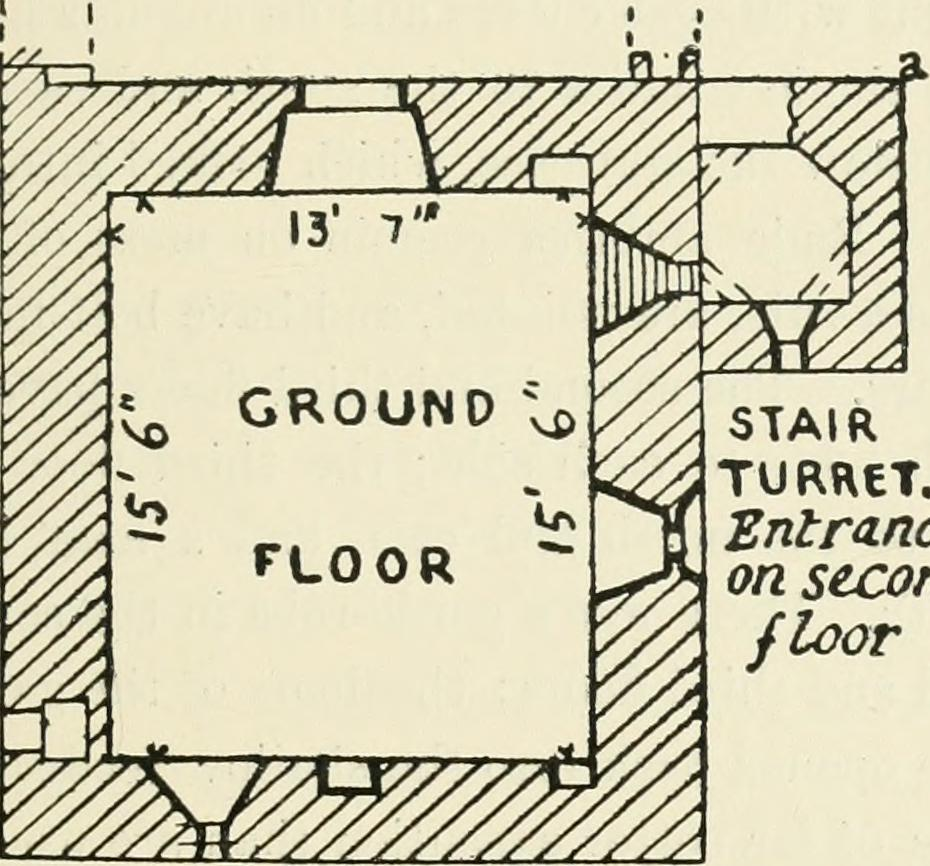
Illustrated plan of Corr Castle form "A history of the County Dublin; the people, parishes and antiquities from the earliest times to the close of the eighteenth century" (1903)

The castle is recorded on the Fingal County Council Record of Protected Structures (RPS 0551) with the description – Remains of 16th century castle of St. Lawrence family in open space at centre of apartment development. The castle is also recorded on the Record of Monuments and Places (RMP DU015-025) which notes the architectural detailing and archaeological significance of the building.

Among the identifiable features include the remains of a bawn wall, turrets, garderobe chutes – which could have had various uses over time, battlements and machicolations and a chamber with a corbelled roof. Although the tower has various defensive features, it is not clear that defense was the primary purpose of the building and rather functioned as a look-out tower and more as accommodation over time. Other more decorative features which have been recorded on the castle since the 18th century include a cut stone fireplace, pointed cut stone arch windows and a number of carved features including a bold chamfer with a defaced floral finial on the North East edge of the main tower and a rude human face on a projecting stone on the East side.

Archaeological testing in the area immediately surrounding the tower has recorded evidence of habitation as far back as the 13th and 14th century.

Today the tower is well preserved and protected by virtue of its specific status. It now sits in a gated apartment complex with no new building permitted in the vicinity.
