= Howth Castle =

Castle within demesne at Howth, near Dublin, Ireland

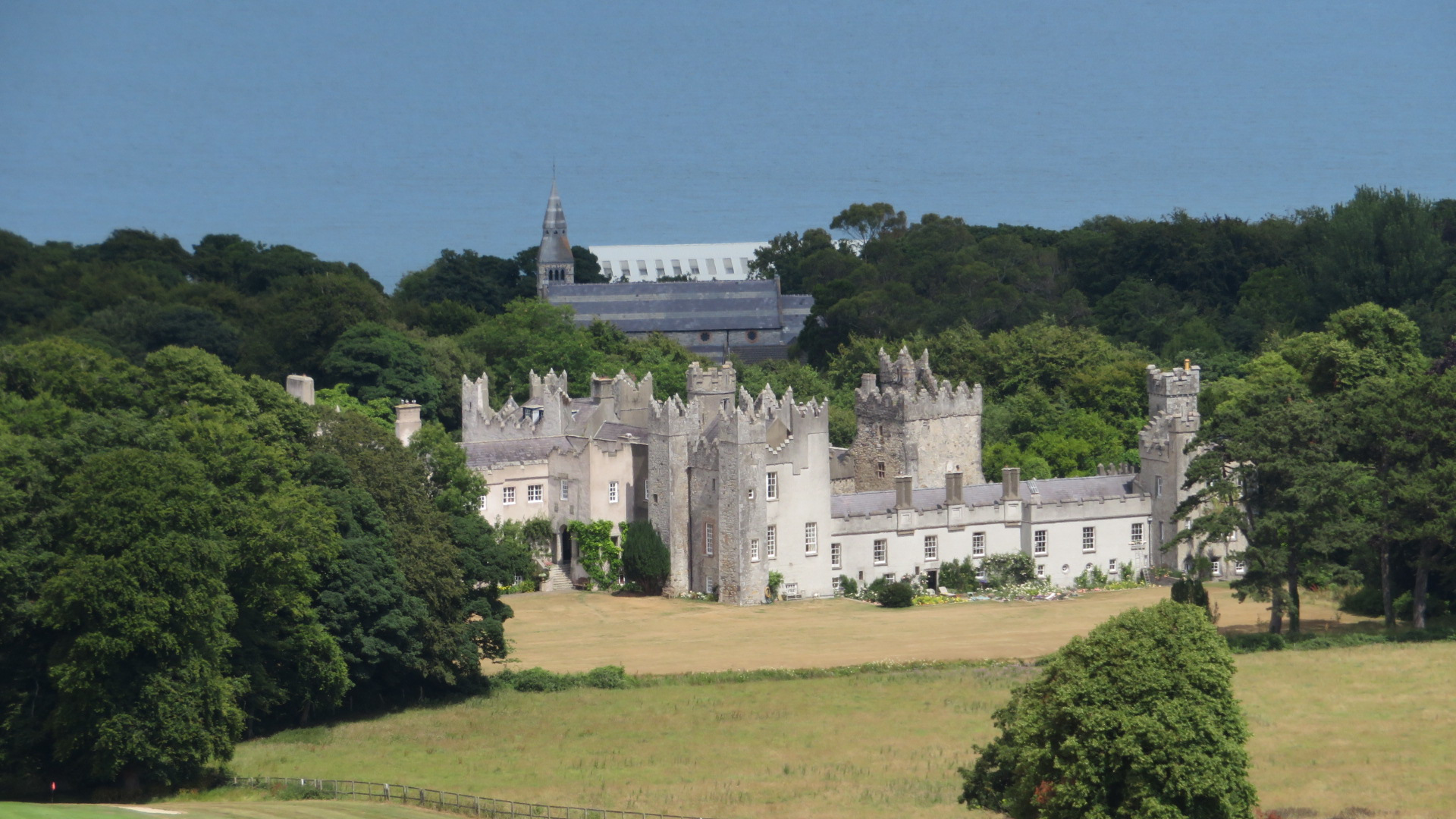
- Interactive map of the Howth Castle area

General information
- Status: Former private dwelling house
- Type: Castle
- Architectural style: Various including Medieval defensive, Gothic, Georgian, Arts and Crafts
- Location: Howth, Howth, County Dublin, Ireland
- Coordinates: 53.3862°N 6.0794°W
- Groundbreaking: c. 1235 (wooden building)
- Construction started: 1300s

Technical details
- Material: limestone, Portland stone Georgian door and window surrounds

Design and construction
- Architects: Francis Bindon (1738); Richard Morrison (1810, gates); Francis Johnston (1825, minor alterations); Richard Morrison (1840, stables and other minor alterations); Joseph Maguire (1872, Gate lodge)
- Developer: Various Lords, Barons and Earls of Howth
- Other designers: James Hogan & Sons (1875, interior plasterwork)

Renovating team
- Architects: Edwin Lutyens (1910-11, tower, loggia, chapel, corridors)
- Civil engineer: Frederick William Higginbotham (1910-11)

Howth Castle (/ˈhoʊθ/ HOHTH) is a historic dwelling, based on 14th and 15th century Anglo-Norman construction, that lies by the village of Howth, County Dublin, Ireland. It is sited within a substantial estate. The castle was the ancestral home of the St Lawrence family that had held the area since the 12th century Norman invasion, and the head of which held in time the titles of Lord Howth (a feudal barony) until circa 1425, Baron Howth to 1767, then Earl of Howth until 1909. The castle and estate were held by distaff heirs, the Gaisford-St Lawrence family, from 1909 to 2019, when they were sold to an investment group, Tetrarch.

The estate today still includes a major part of the peninsula of Howth Head, including extensive heathland and much of Howth's cliff walks, with views over Dublin Bay, light woodland, and the island of Ireland's Eye. On the grounds near the castle are golf courses, a hotel and gardens. There is also a collapsed portal tomb and several small streams pass through the estate.

In October 2018, the Gaisford St Lawrence family announced their agreement to sell the castle, demesne and Ireland's Eye to the Tetrarch investment group who intended to redevelop the hotel and course as a luxury resort. A 7-acre portion of the site zoned for residential development close to the castle gate was sold onwards by Tetrarch to Glenveagh Homes for €14m after the main sale closed. The contents of the castle, including most furniture, were sold at auction in 2021, with a separate auction of books and letters.

== History ==
=== Bronze age settlement ===
On the grounds of Howth Castle is a dolmen tomb known as Aideen's Grave thought to date to around 2500 BC. According to legend it is the resting place of the mythological figure Aideen. This legend is the subject of the poem 'Aideen's Grave' by Samuel Ferguson.

=== Norse period ===
Later, towards the end of the 1st millennium, Viking raids began to occur along the Irish coast with Lambay Island and Howth being two of the prominent areas which still retain Norse names.

=== Norman castle to Georgian country house ===
Since 1179/1180, the St Lawrence family were the feudal lords of Howth. The original family castle, a timber structure, was sited on the edge of Howth village, on Tower Hill, overlooking Balscadden Bay. The wooden structure was moved to the current site around 1235, while the first stone castle was commenced in the following century, and the oldest part of the current building dates from the 1450s. Further major works were performed by several of the Lords of Howth.

=== 20th century ===
The architect Edwin Lutyens in 1911 restyled the 14th-century castle built here, overlooking Ireland's Eye and the north Dublin coastline.

The estate previously included much of coastal northern Dublin, including the lands of Kilbarrack, Raheny and parts of Clontarf, but these were gradually sold off from the mid-19th to the mid-20th century.

In the second half of the 20th century, the castle's demesne was largely redeveloped to provide golfing facilities, and a mid-price hotel, with bar, restaurant and spa facilities, was opened.

=== 21st century ===
In the early 21st century the castle saw the opening of a cookery school, and later a small cafe, and was occasionally available for guided tours.

==== Sale ====
In October 2018, Julian Gaisford St-Lawrence announced that the family had agreed to sell the castle and hotel, and 470 acres of demesne, wider lands and Ireland's Eye, to a private investment group, Tetrarch. The golf club and related facilities would remain open through 2019, the hotel would be redeveloped and reopened as a luxury property, and residential development would be possible. No details were given at the time on whether the family would retain some land, or a life right to live in the castle, or of the future of the volunteer-operated National Transport Museum of Ireland, located on the grounds.

A 7-acre portion of the site zoned for residential development close to the castle gate was sold onwards by Tetrarch to Glenveagh Homes for €14m after the main sale closed. The contents of the castle, including most furniture, were sold in Malahide by Fonsie Mealy auctioneers in 2021, with a separate auction of books and letters in Sutton.

== Grace O'Malley legend ==
A popular legend about the castle concerns an incident that allegedly occurred in 1576. During a trip from Dublin, the Gaelic chieftain and "pirate queen" Gráinne O'Malley attempted to pay a courtesy visit to the 8th Baron Howth. However, she was informed that the family was at dinner and the castle gates were closed against her. In retaliation, she abducted the grandson and heir, the 10th Baron. He was eventually released when a promise was given to keep the gates open to unexpected visitors and to set an extra plate at every meal.

== Castle and Grounds ==
=== Castle ===
In 1177 Almeric Tristram, the first Lord of Howth, came to Ireland with John de Courcy. It is likely the first Lord built a modest wooden castle close to the harbour near the present day village and St Mary's Abbey.

The first evidence of a castle on the current site is from a deed of 1235 indicating a new castle was built also in wood.

The earliest parts of the current castle and structures to survive is are likely the keep and gate tower in stone dating from around 1450.

=== Interiors ===
Most of the interiors of the castle were sold at auction in September 2021.

Much of the interiors and even some of the windows of Killester House, a former dower house of the Howth estate, were moved to Howth Castle following its dereliction and eventual demolition including a marble fireplace which stands in the Lutyens library.

The rear gate pillars leading up what is now Old Castle Avenue from Carrickbrack Road were also taken from Killester House where they were the original Georgian gates in granite and portland stone.

=== Grounds ===
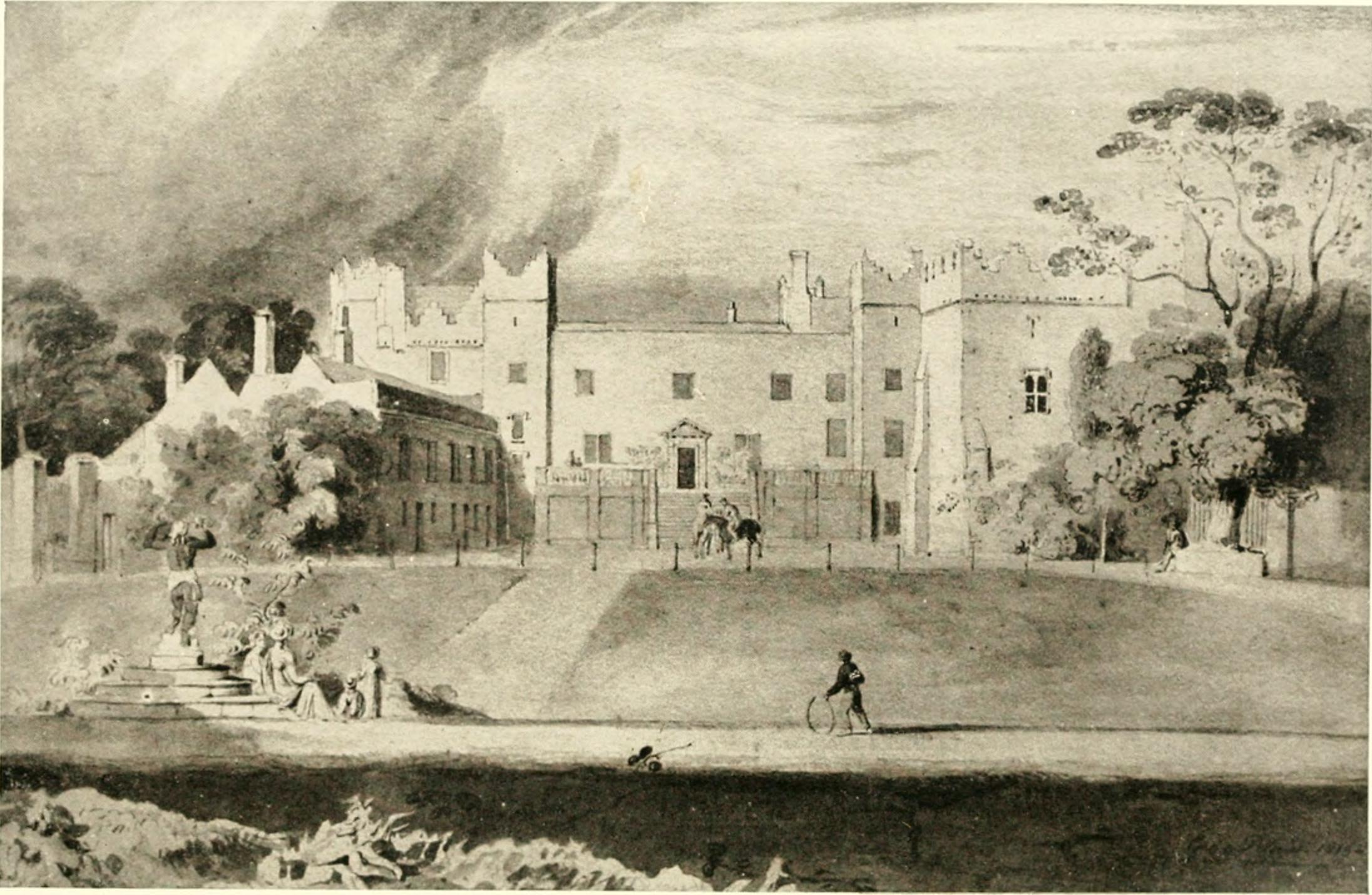
Howth Castle, 1819, an engraving after George Petrie

In 1892 Rosa Mulholland referred to the grounds thus: "Back on the lower land you must visit the ancient demesne of the Earl of Howth, where a quaint old castle stands in a prim garden with swan-inhabited pond, and plashing fountain, encircled by dark beautiful woods full of lofty cathedral-like aisles, moss carpeted, and echoing with the cawing of rooks."(Mulholland 1892: 35)

The grounds near the castle are noted for the wild rhododendron gardens, which are open to the public in summer, and some of the oldest beech hedges in Ireland, planted in 1710. At certain times, such as summer 2016, guided tours of the castle could be booked at weekends. As late as the mid-20th century, there was a rock garden near the Church of Ireland parish church, a "sundial garden" near the main entrance gate, an orchard and a moat and the site of a well or spring in front of the castle; all of these features later fell into disuse. A small sunken garden lay beside the castle's chapel wing, and a formal garden, of which parts remain, behind it, with a walk cutting through to the Swan Pond, beside which was a fern garden.

The Bloody Stream ran in front of the castle, another stream used to pass directly by, and was later captured by castle drainage, and a third was connected to the Swan Pond. One of the streams in Sutton also comes from within the estate.

The more remote parts of the estate are treated as more or less public land, with walking trails, and are substantially subject to a Special Amenity Area Order.

In the 20th century, the 17th classical landscape was substantially modified to make the Deer Park golf courses, which had an associated hotel, the Deer Park Hotel, for many years.

The "Kitchen in the Castle Cookery School" was opened by two members of the family, based in the restored Georgian kitchens of Howth Castle.

The volunteer-operated National Transport Museum of Ireland is located in the grounds of the castle. It features lorries, trucks, fire engines and tractors. Also exhibited is the restored Hill of Howth No.9 Tram.

=== Howth Park Racecourse (1829 - 1842) ===
In 1829 a racecourse was established in the castle grounds by Thomas St Lawrence, 3rd Earl of Howth who had a particular passion for horses. The course was known as Howth Park Racecourse and ran from the backgate lodge of the castle on Carrickbrack Road down to the corner of the grounds of Seafield House (now Santa Sabina school) and North broadly along the route of Offington before circling Corr Castle and returning up along the Howth Road.

The races were attended by all the leading owners, trainers and jockeys of the day with the race-card paying testament to the importance of the occasion. A sample of attendees from 1838 included Lord Howth, Lord Sligo, Sir John Kennedy, Captain Burke and Burnell and the Lord Lieutenant of Ireland, Constantine Phipps, 1st Marquess of Normanby. Although initially only members of respected racing clubs (Howth Park Club or the Corinthians Club at the Curragh) and gentry were allowed to enter, in 1834 access expanded to include a Tradesmen's Cup and in 1839 a Citizens' Plate. The races stopped permanently at Howth in 1842, likely due to the death of Emily, first wife of the Lord Howth however racing did eventually recommence post the Great Famine nearby at Baldoyle Racecourse from 1853 onward. Notable races included the St.Lawrence Stakes and the Vaughan Goblet.

== Popular culture ==
=== Literature ===
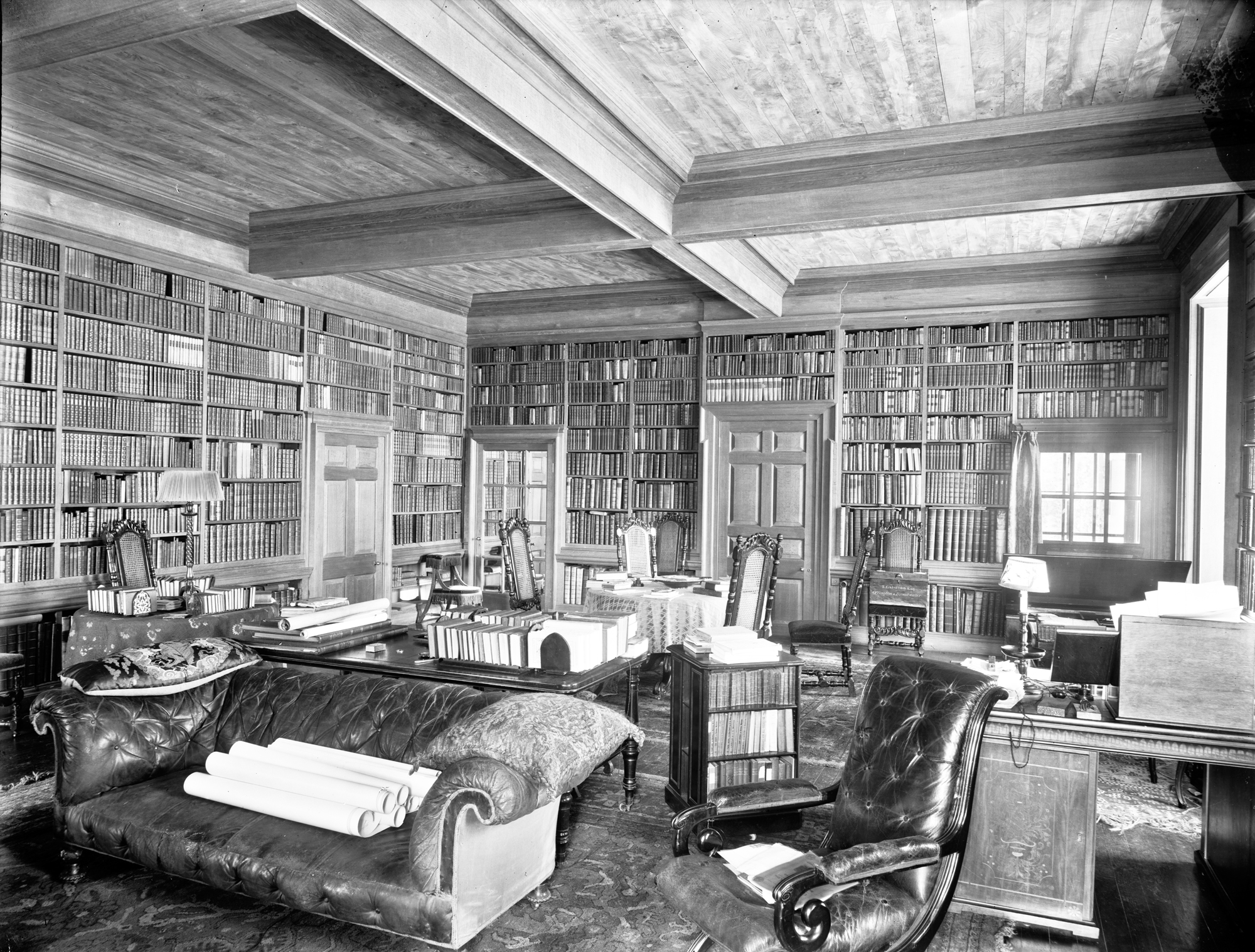
Howth Castle Library, Howth circa 1910

The locale of James Joyce's 1939 novel Finnegans Wake is "Howth Castle and Environs," which is taken to mean Dublin, and it begins and ends with a reference to this. The initials HCE appear in many contexts in the novel, not least in the name of its presumed main character, Humphrey Chimpden Earwicker.

Joyce also put more than a dozen references to Howth, its team and the rhododendron walks near the castle, in his 1922 novel Ulysses.

In his "Reveries over Childhood and Youth" (1916) W. B. Yeats recalls "I would sleep among the rhododendrons and rocks in the wilder part of the grounds of Howth Castle".

=== Film location ===
Howth Castle was depicted as the fictitious "Castle Haloran" from the 1963 Roger Corman and Francis Ford Coppola b-film Dementia 13 (a.k.a. The Haunted and the Hunted) where it was the setting of numerous scenes.

Flashback scenes from the Sergio Leone Spaghetti Western, Duck, You Sucker were shot here. The castle was used extensively for exterior shots in Love & Friendship, Whit Stillman's adaptation of the Jane Austen novel Lady Susan. Howth castle was also featured prominently in the 2021 Hallmark movie "As Luck Would Have It."

== Sources ==
- Mulholland, R. (1892). "At Howth." The Irish Monthly 20(223): 33–7.
