= Carrickbrack Road =

Road on Howth Head, Dublin

- R105
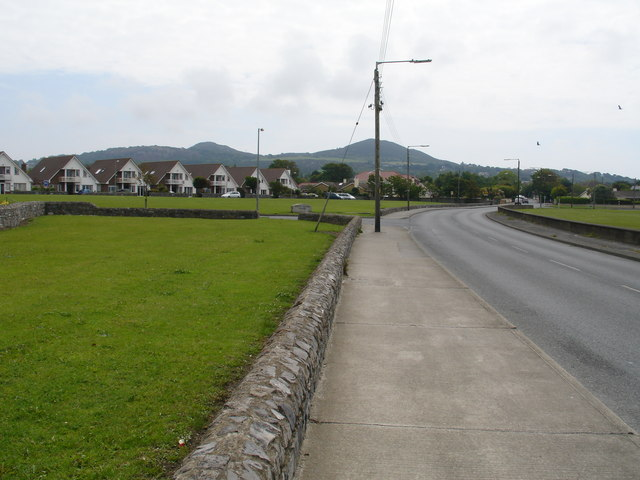
- Housing off Carrickbrack Road

- Location within Dublin
- Native name: Bóthar Charraig Bhreac (Irish)
- Namesake: Carrickbrack Rock
- Length: 4.5 km (2.8 mi)
- Width: 11 metres (36 ft)
- Location: Howth Head, Dublin, Ireland
- Postal code: D13
- Coordinates: 53.371816°N 6.087629°W
- west end: Greenfield Road
- east end: Thormanby Road

Carrickbrack Road (Irish: Bóthar Charraig Bhreac) is a road in Dublin, Ireland, a constituent part of the R105 Regional Road. It leads east-southeast from Sutton Creek around the southern part of Howth Head, up to the eastern part of the headland near Howth Summit, to Thormanby Road. It is the main thoroughfare through the southern part of the headland. Greenfield Road links it to Sutton Cross. Howth Golf Club is located on it, as are Bellingham’s farm, Howth Celtic Football Club, St. Fintan's Cemetery, St. Fintan's National School and various private residences.

The road is named after Carrickbrack Rock (Carraig Breac, "speckled stone"), a peak in the south end of Howth. It is crossed by small streams.

Until its abolition in 1959, the Howth Tram ran along Carrickbrack Road on its way to Howth Summit.

== Amenities ==
St. Fintan's Cemetery, Sutton is on the southwestern part of the road, though the church is on Greenfield Road. People buried in the cemetery include rock band Thin Lizzy's lead singer Phil Lynott, former Taoiseach and president Patrick Hillery and Ex-Taoiseach Charles J. Haughey.

Shielmartin Hill is visible from much of the western part of the road and can be accessed from it.

== Connecting roads and housing estates ==
The road provides entry to the housing estates of Santa Sabina Manor, Offington, Duncarrig, Glencarraig, and Carrickbrack Lawns, as well as Strand Road, Baron Hill, Windgate Road, Ceanchor Road and St. Fintan's Road.

The Stella Maris convent was housed in a former private residence that was donated to the order in 1893. The convent ran a retreat centre on the site until 2019 when the grounds and buildings were sold to the Gallagher family.

== See also ==
- List of streets and squares in Dublin
