= Sutton Creek =

Sutton Creek may refer to:

- Sutton Creek (Ireland)
- Sutton Creek (Susquehanna River), a tributary of the Susquehanna River in Luzerne County, Pennsylvania
