= Shielmartin Hill =

Peak on Howth Head near Dublin, Ireland

Coordinates: 53.373365°N 6.083423°W

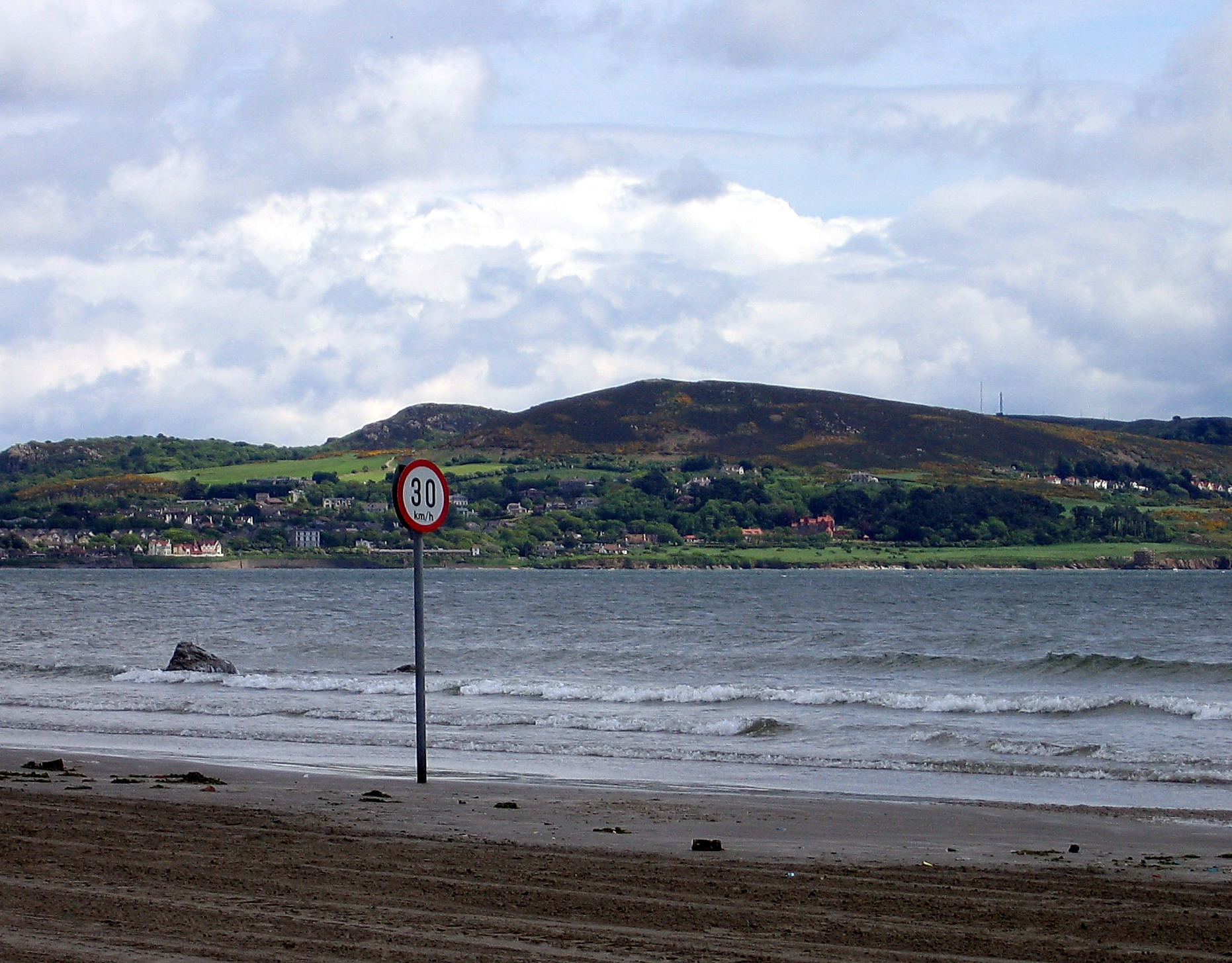
- Shielmartin Hill is the hill to the right of the speed limit sign, viewed from the Bull Island in Dublin Bay.

Highest point
- Elevation: 163 m (535 ft)

Naming
- Native name: Cnoc Shíol Mhártain

Geography
- Location within island of Ireland
- Location: County Dublin, Ireland
- Parent range: Wicklow Mountains
- Topo map: OSi Discovery 50

Shielmartin Hill or Shelmartin (Irish: Cnoc Shíol Mhártain, meaning 'Martin's seed or race') (163 metres (535 ft) high) is a peak on Howth Head in County Dublin, Ireland. From it can be seen Portmarnock, Sutton, Bull Island and the coastal areas behind it, and most of Dublin Bay.

References to it being called Shielmartin go back to at least 1654.

== Form ==
From Sutton Creek, the crest of the hill seems to be cleft in two, but the actual peak is the southern one (i.e. the one to the right in the picture) - the northern one is an ancient cairn, on whose southern edge three or four modern cairns in the form of circles have been built. The original cairn was reputed to be the burial site of Crimhthan Niadhnair.

== Access ==
A sign engraved on a stone slab indicates that the only right of way lies down the northwest side of the hill. Other paths exist, but the one to the northeast is dangerous as it is both extremely steep and overgrown. A route to the southeast is safe, but leads across the golf course.

The hill is surrounded by Howth Golf Course to the west, north and east. To the southwest it is bordered by Carrickbrack Road, from which a path leads up to the top. Private residences lie to the south.

== Other peaks ==
The hill is sometimes confused with the Black Linn at the Ben of Howth, the highest point of Howth peninsula, which lies approximately 1 kilometre (0.6 mi) to the east. Also adjacent is Dun Hill, while nearby are Muck Rock (Carrickmore) and Carrickbrack.
