= Aideen's Grave =

Neolithic dolmen in County Dublin, Ireland

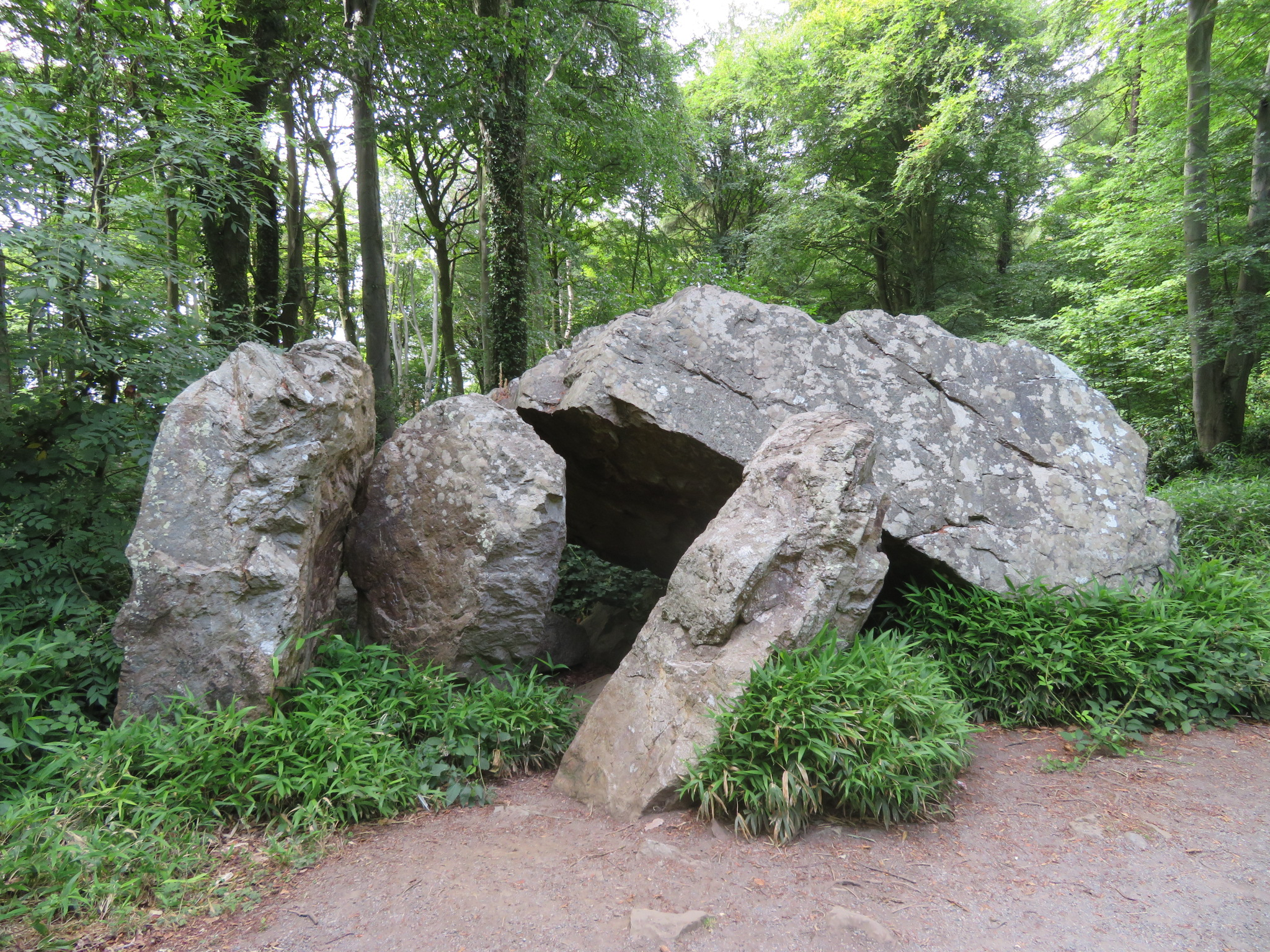
- Front view in 2018
- Interactive map of Aideen's Grave
- 53.3795°N 6.0822°W
- Type: Portal tomb
- Periods: Neolithic
- Location: Howth, Dublin, Ireland

History
- Built: c. 2500 BC

Site notes
- Material: Stone

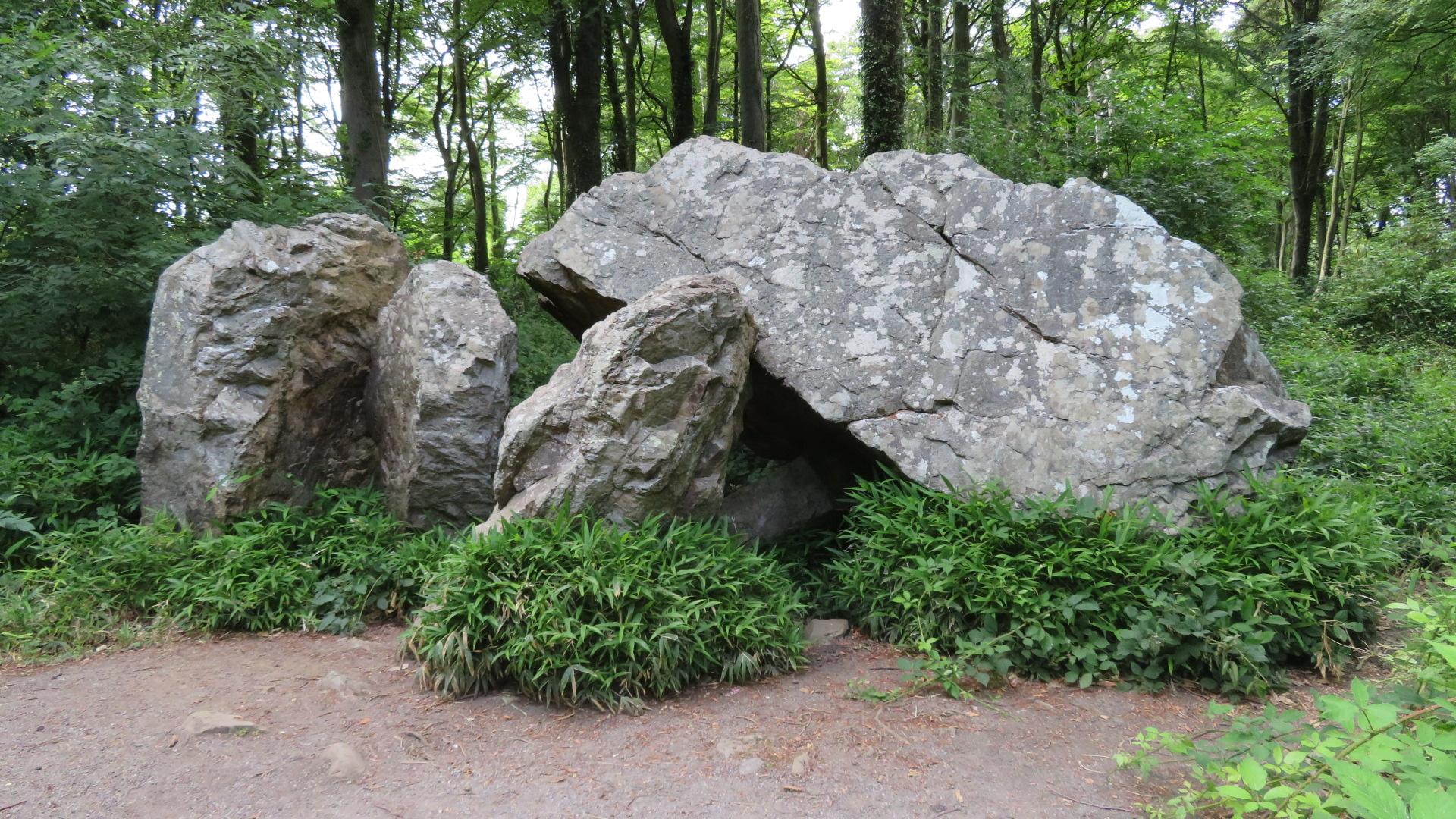
Side view

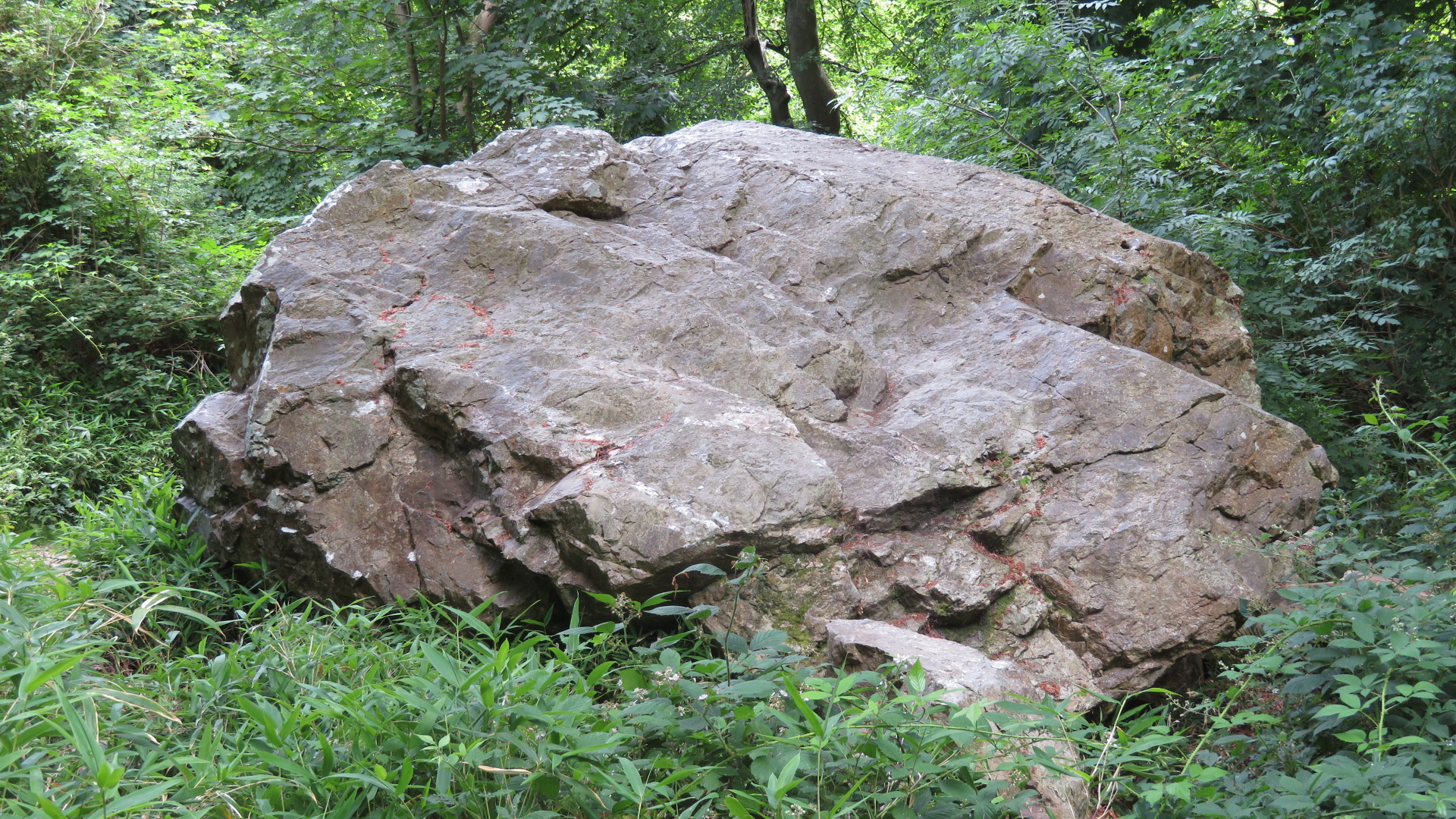
Rear view of collapsed capstone

Aideen's Grave is a collapsed megalithic dolmen (or cromlech) located in the grounds of Howth Castle in County Dublin, Ireland.

== History ==
The tomb is thought to date to around 2500 BC, and is located on the lower slopes of the Hill of Howth, overlooked by cliffs named Muck Rock, and faces south-east. It is likely the large cap-stone was brought from the quartzite cliff nearby.

=== Description ===
The tomb consists of two portal stones, an entrance stone and a collapsed colossal roof stone, which weighs an estimated 75 tonnes. The capstone is the second largest in Ireland after the one at Brownshill dolmen in County Carlow. The tomb has a single chamber.

=== Aideen ===
Aideen is said to be the daughter of Aengus, the ruler of Howth (Irish: Binn Éadair, meaning 'Éadar's peak') in the 3rd century. She was also the wife of Oscar, the son of Oisín and it is said that Aideen died of grief after the death of Oscar at the Cath Gabhra.

Alternatively, the name Aideen is said to refer to Étaín, a figure in Irish mythology.

=== Preservation and protection ===
In 2024, calls were made by politicians Cian O'Callaghan, TD and Councillor Joan Hopkins (Fingal County Council) to make the tomb and surrounding area a national monument.

== Poem ==
The dolmen is the subject of a poem by Samuel Ferguson named Aideen's Grave.

Aideen's Grave (excerpt)

They heaved the stone; they heap'd the cairn:
Said Ossian "In a queenly grave
We leave her, 'mong her fields of fern
Between the cliff and wave.

"The cliff behind stands clear and bare,
And bare, above, the heathery steep
Scales the clear heaven's expanse, to where
The Danaan Druids sleep.

— Samuel Ferguson (1864)
