= St. Fintan's Cemetery, Sutton =

Cemetery in Sutton, Dublin, Ireland

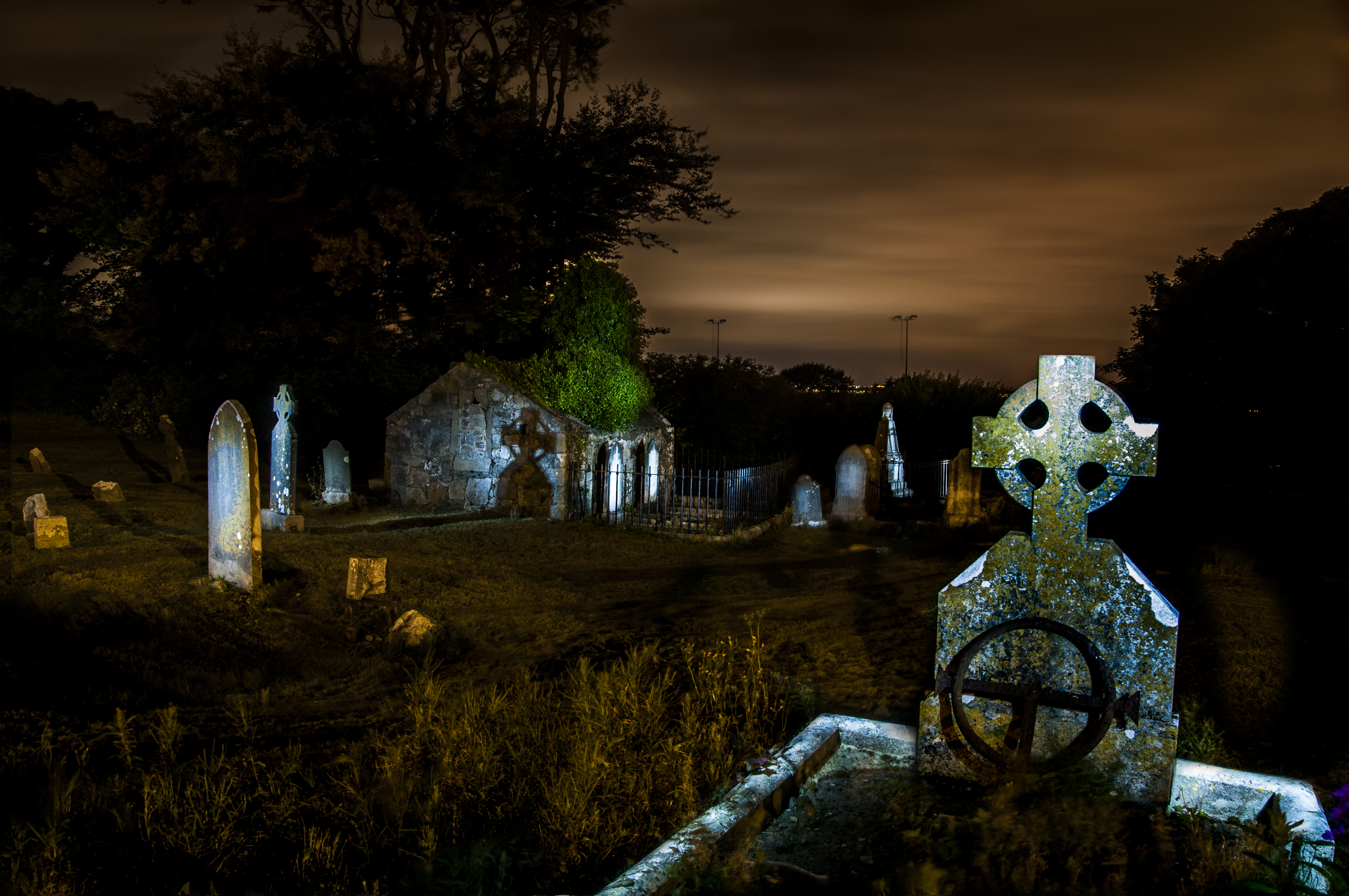
- St. Fintan's cemetery

Details
- Location: Carrickbrack Road, Sutton, Dublin
- Country: Ireland
- Coordinates: 53.378292°N 6.092058°W
- Type: Public
- Owned by: St. Fintan's Parish
- No. of graves: 1,400+
- Website: stfintansparish.ie
- Find a Grave: St. Fintan's Cemetery, Sutton

St. Fintan's Cemetery is located in Sutton, on the south side of Carrickbrack Road in Dublin, Ireland.

The cemetery is laid out in several sections: original with a ruined keeper's cottage and the remnants of old St. Fintan's Church, 1889, 1907 and 1954 extensions, and St. Fintan's Lawn Cemetery divided to St. Marnoc's, St. Assam's, St. Barroc's, St. Nessan's a St. Polan's. Just beyond the older portion is the still-flowing, still-visited St. Fintan's Holy Well.

== History ==
The original St. Fintan's church and cemetery is believed to be a monastic site dating from the 6th or 7th century although the remaining church is likely an early Norman structure.

== Notable people buried in the cemetery ==
- Harry Bradshaw, leading Irish professional golfer of the 1940s and 1950s.
- Jack Belton, TD, Lord Mayor of Dublin
- Frankie Byrne, Broadcaster
- Gay Byrne, RTÉ radio and TV presenter
- Frank Cahill, Irish nationalist, teacher and political
- Frank Cluskey Leader of the Labour Party 1979–1981
- Pádraic Colum and Mary Colum, writers
- Maureen Cusack, actress
- Hilton Edwards, director, buried with Micheál Mac Liammhóir
- Gerald FizGibbon, judge
- Charles Haughey, 7th Taoiseach of Ireland who was buried here following a State funeral
- Patrick Hillery, 6th President of Ireland
- John Hunt, antiquarian
- Mainie Jellett, artist
- Seán Dublin Bay Rockall Loftus, Irish politician, lawyer, and environmentalist
- Phil Lynott, iconic rock musician, formerly of the band Thin Lizzy
- Micheál Mac Liammóir, author and playwright
- Christopher Nolan, author
- Tommy Potts, Irish traditional fiddle player and composer
- Feargal Quinn, founder of Superquinn and Senator
- Tom Stafford, Mayor of Dublin
- William Stokes, physician
- Stardust fire, victims of the nightclub fire in 1981

== Commonwealth War Graves Commission ==
The Commonwealth War Graves Commission registers and maintains two graves of British service officers of World War II, one of the Royal Air Force (in the old ground) and another of the Royal Naval Volunteer Reserve (in the newer extension).
