= Burrow Beach =

Strand on Howth Head, County Dublin

Burrow Beach Hole in the Wall Beach
- Beach
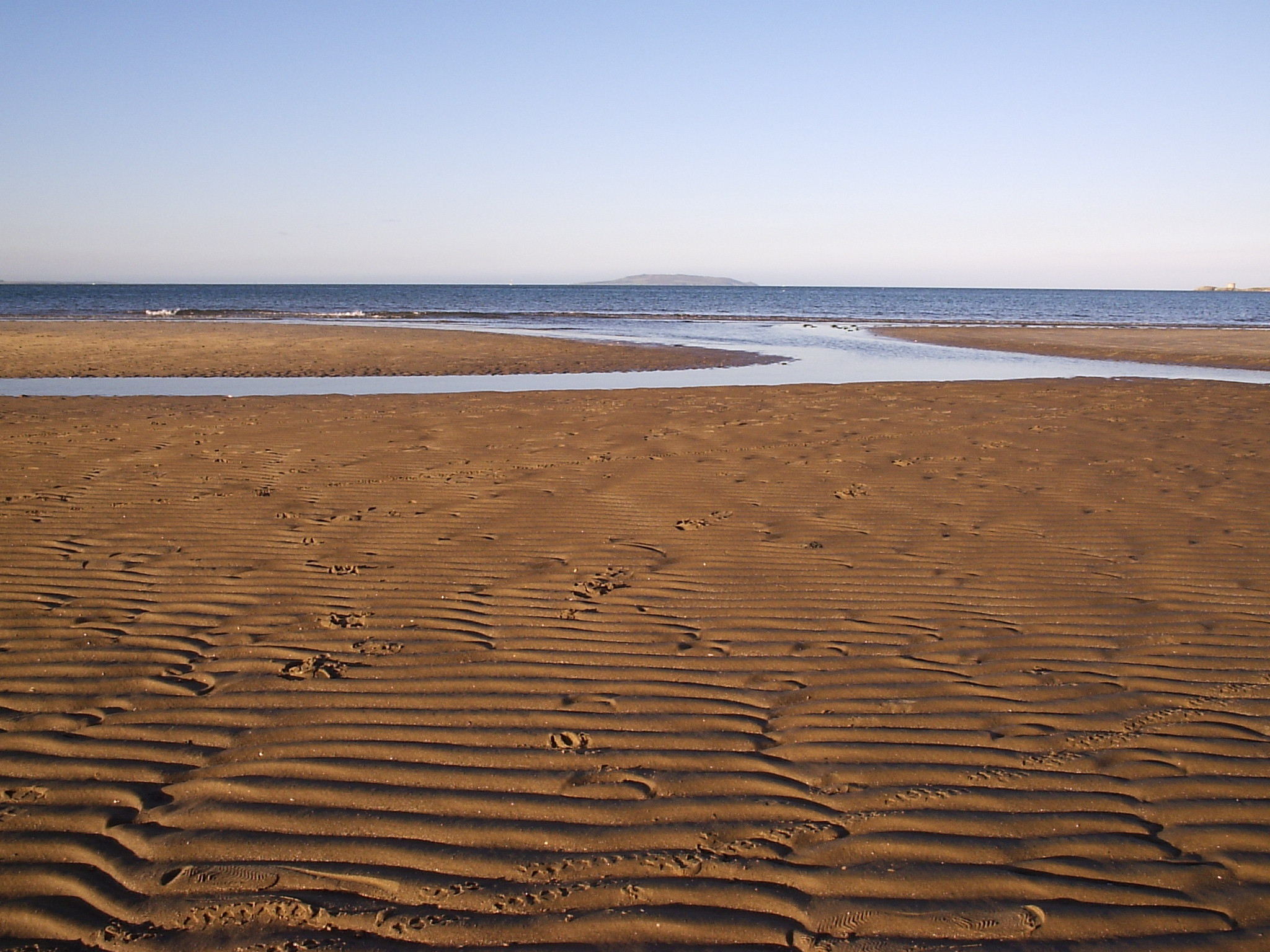
- The beach facing north to Lambay island at low tide

- Location in Ireland
- Coordinates: 53.3925°N 6.1017°W
- Location: Sutton, Dublin

Dimensions
  - Length: 1.2km
- Access: From Burrow Road

Burrow Beach, also known as the Hole in the Wall locally, is a beach in Sutton, in Fingal, County Dublin, Ireland. It neighbours Claremont Beach by Howth village, and, across the water (the exit of the inlet of Baldoyle Bay), Portmarnock Strand. It is served by a lifeguard during the summer months and is a green flag beach.

== Location and geography ==
The beach is located on the north side of the Tombolo of Sutton which connects Howth Head to the mainland. It is a 1.2km long sandy beach and contains a large area of sand dunes.

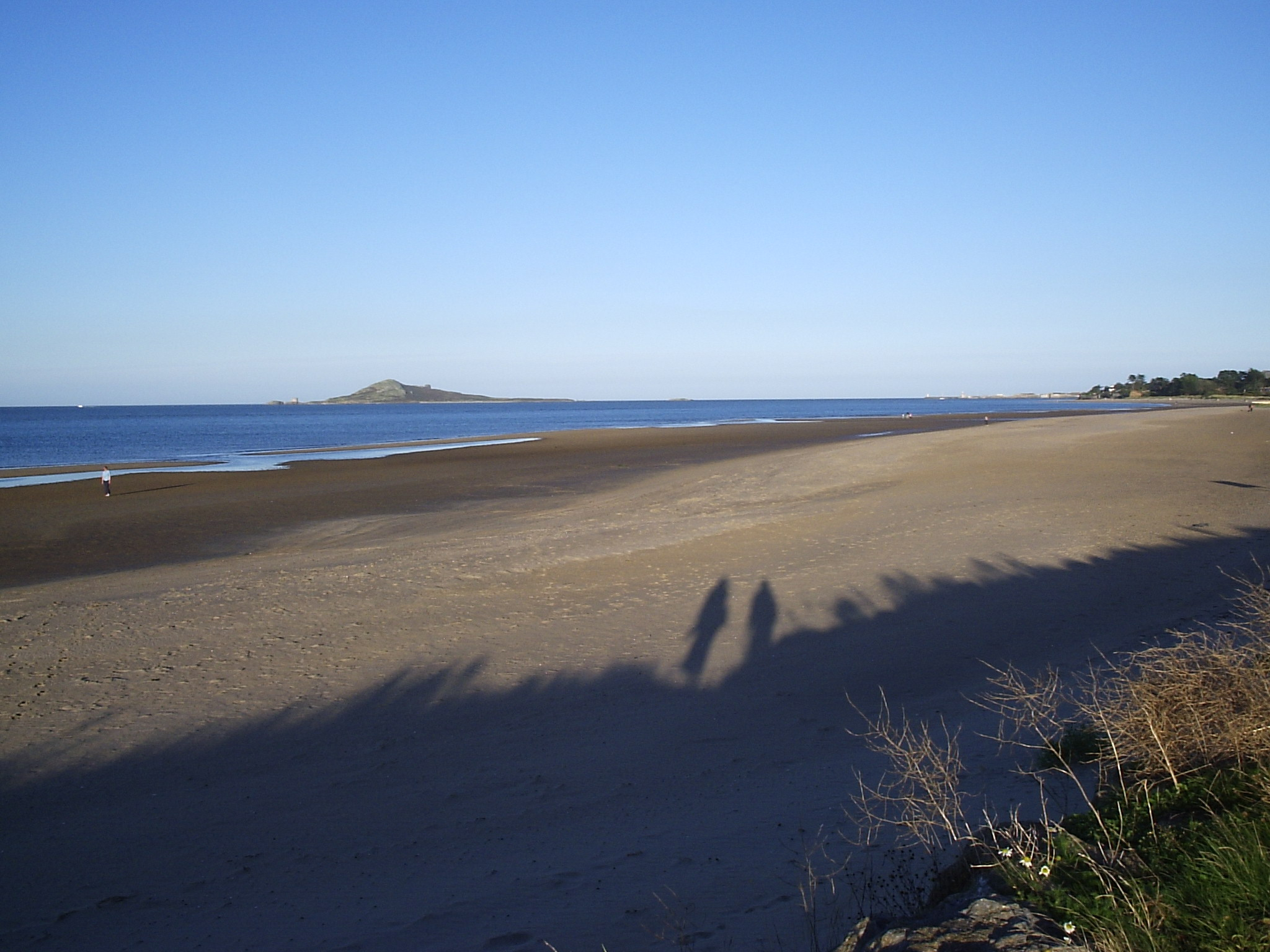
Ireland's Eye seen from the beach

The beach is served by the DART, as Sutton Station is a walkable distance away. Its main entrance is located on the Burrow road. It is also served by Dublin Bus route H3 and 6 from Sutton Cross, as well as route 102 which terminates at the DART station.

== See also ==
- Sutton, Dublin
- Howth
