= Sutton, Dublin =

Residential suburb of Dublin, Ireland

Sutton Cill Fhionntain (Irish)
- Suburb
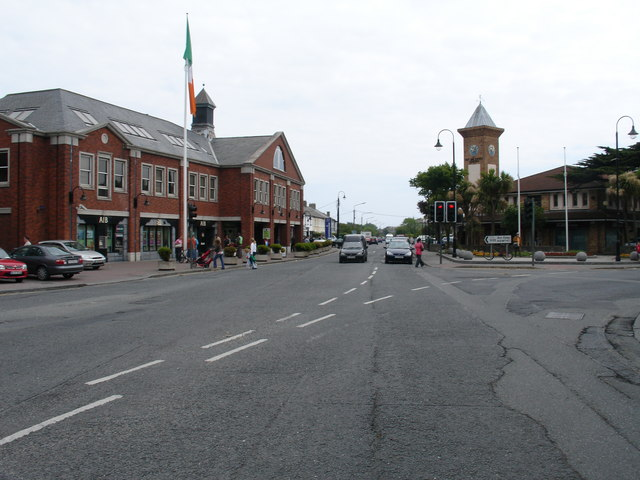
- Sutton Cross

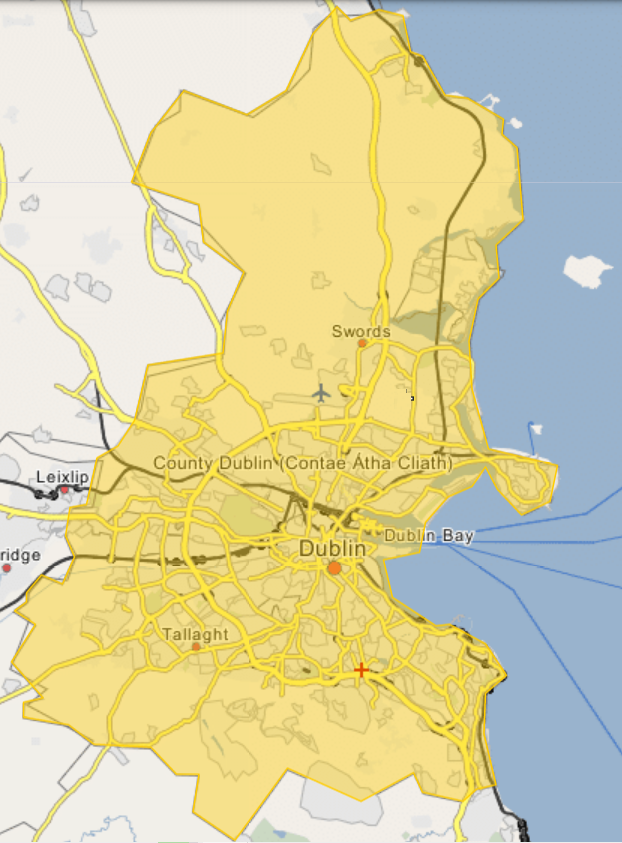
- Location in Ireland Sutton (Ireland) Sutton (Dublin)
- Coordinates: 53°23′10″N 6°06′00″W
- Country: Ireland
- Province: Leinster
- Traditional county: County Dublin
- Local government area: Fingal County Council

Population (2016)
  - Total: 5,680
- Eircode routing key: D13

Sutton (Irish: Cill Fhionntain, meaning 'Fintan's cell or church') is a residential suburb on the Northside of Dublin, Ireland. It occupies the tombolo which links Howth Head to the mainland, some of the lower slopes of Howth Hill, and a little of the adjacent coasts. There is a small commercial core at the Sutton Cross road intersection.

Sutton lies in the ancient Barony of Coolock, within the traditional County Dublin.

== History ==
The first recorded mention of Sutton in reference to the area is from around 1228–48, noted in the Calendar of Archbishop Alen's Register; it is likely linked to a person of Norman origin. Another theory postulates it may be linked to Hugh de Suttoun who was prior of Christ Church Cathedral around 1320–26.

== Location and geography ==
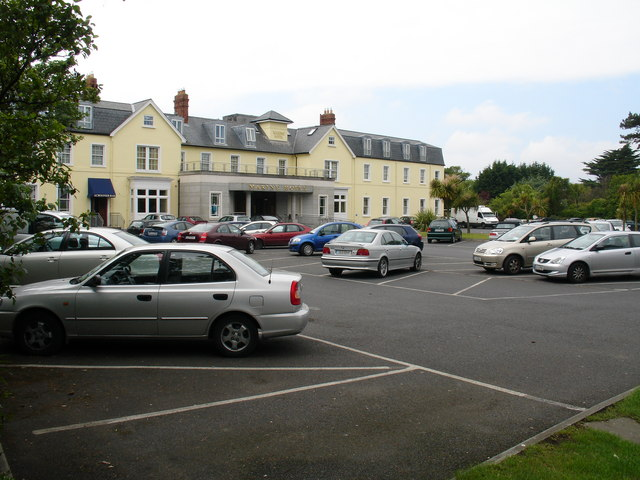
Marine Hotel, Sutton Cross

=== Location ===
Historically Sutton lay entirely on the Howth peninsula, from Sutton Cross up to Claremont Road and where Barren Hill meets Carrickbrack Road and the Martello Tower at Red Rock. Today, however, it is generally considered to extend to the railway, where it meets Baldoyle, and to the junction of Baldoyle Road and the coast road, where it meets Bayside, these additional lands historically having been farmland. The only neighbouring district on Howth Head is Howth itself.

=== Access ===
Beginning on the Howth Road (R105) about 12 kilometres from the city centre, Sutton neighbours Howth, which occupies most of the Howth peninsula, and Baldoyle and Bayside. It is served by the main road from Dublin to Howth (R105). Dublin Bus serves the area with routes H3 and 6, within the BusConnects scheme. There is a cycleway that connects Sutton to Clontarf and Fairview, with works ongoing to connect to Sandymount.

Sutton railway station opened on 30 July 1846 as Baldoyle & Sutton, being renamed Sutton in 1901. The station lies on the Howth branch of the commuter rail network and is served by the Dublin Area Rapid Transit (DART) system.

The Hill of Howth Tramway ran between Sutton railway station and Howth railway station around the Hill of Howth until 1959.

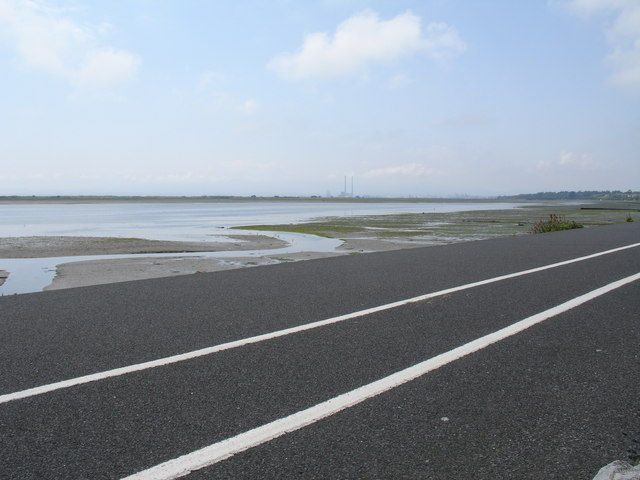
The cycleway at Sutton works are ongoing to connect it to Sandymount

=== Geography ===
At the core of Sutton is a tombolo connecting Howth (which used to be an island) to the mainland. The original village of Sutton was situated on the city-facing (south-western) side of Howth Head, along Strand Road, where there are today housing terraces and a small harbour, but the area is now centred on Sutton Cross.

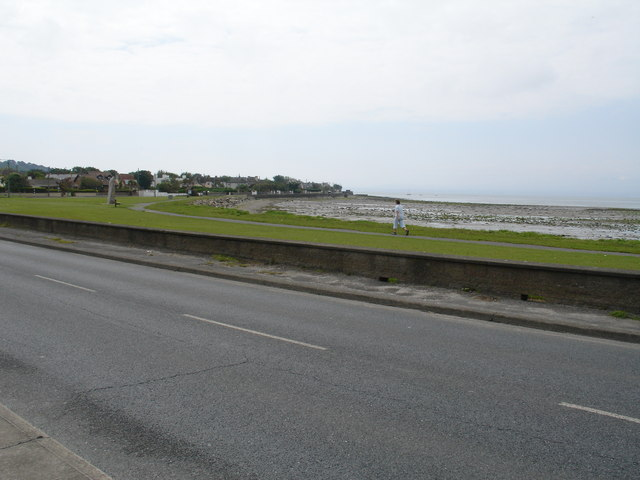
Strand Road coastal pathway and Luí na Gréine standing stone in the distance

==== Streams ====
There are several small streams in the area, all substantially culverted. Some tiny flows cross the Sutton end of the Cliff Walk paths, and two bigger streams, Santa Sabina Stream and the Carrickbrack Stream, discharge at the coast on Sutton Strand. Carrickbrack Stream rises between Shielmartin Hill and Dun Hill near Howth Golf Course, and flows, meeting minor tributaries, roughly parallel to Carrickbrack Road, coming to the shore at the south-western end of the strand, while Santa Sabina Stream comes from the central area of the Howth (Deer Park) Estate, and runs in culvert past the Offington housing estate and through the grounds of Santa Sabina Dominican Convent, reaching the sand around 150m north of the mouth of the Carrickbrack, with concrete framing and a guard rail. The Santa Sabina outfall, in front of Saint Fintan's Roman Catholic church, sometimes flows very actively but is notably sometimes covered by sand, which is then cleared by Fingal County Council staff.

==== Beaches ====
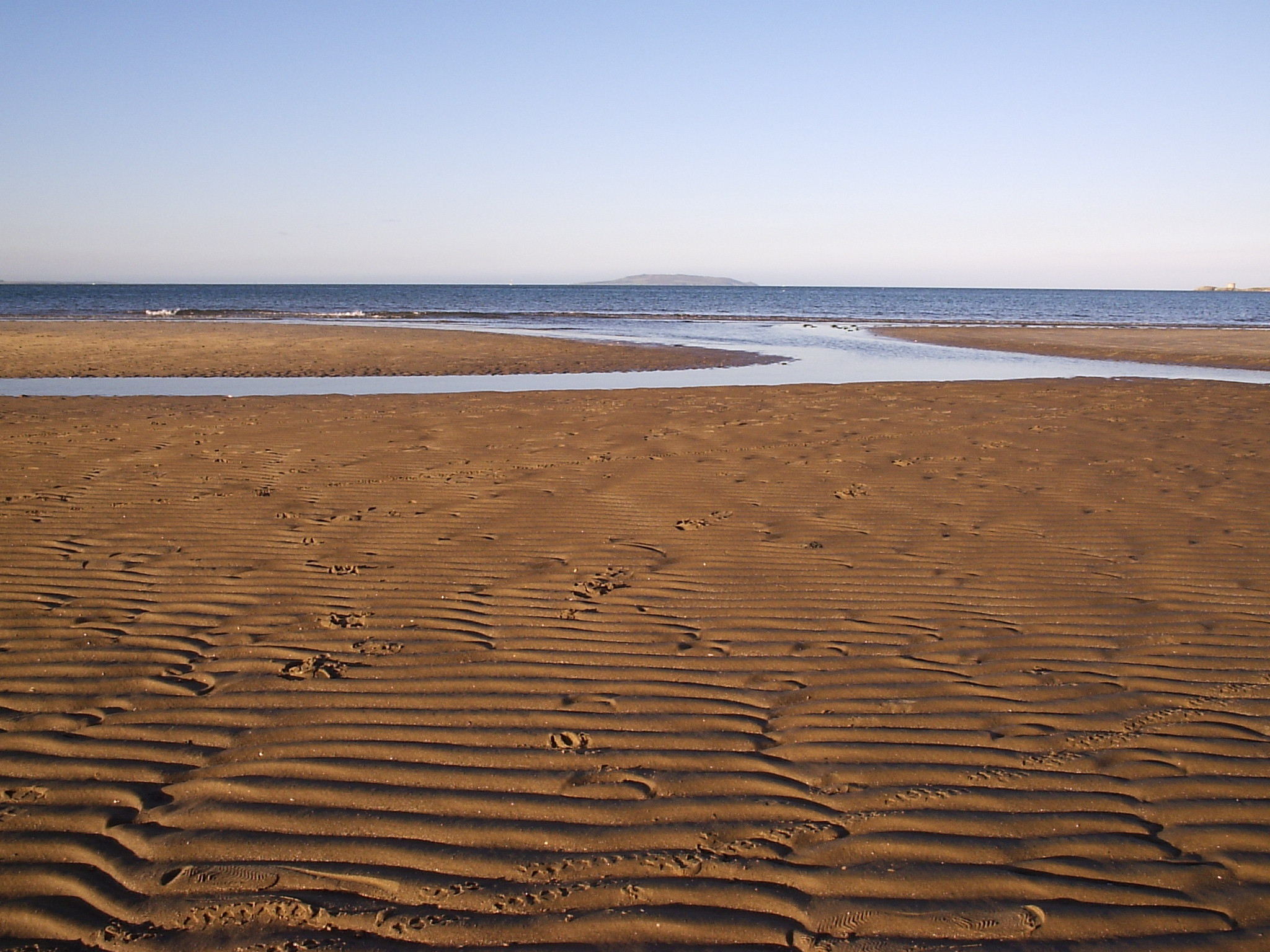
Burrow Beach at Sutton, Dublin, looking north towards Lambay Island

Sutton is surrounded by many beaches. The Burrow Beach is approximately 1.2 km and stretches from Sutton Golf Club to Howth, along one side of the tombolo connecting Howth Head to the mainland. Sutton Strand runs along the coast road and in front of St. Fintan's church.

==== Quarries ====
Two quarries previously operated in Sutton on the Howth Road near Corr Castle and at Barren Hill on St.Fintans Road. Both are now closed.

== Amenities ==
There is one main commercial area, with a SuperValu store (previously a Superquinn) supermarket, under that chain's HQ, which in turn had replaced the local cinema), the Marine Hotel, a post office, and other banking, dining and retail operations.

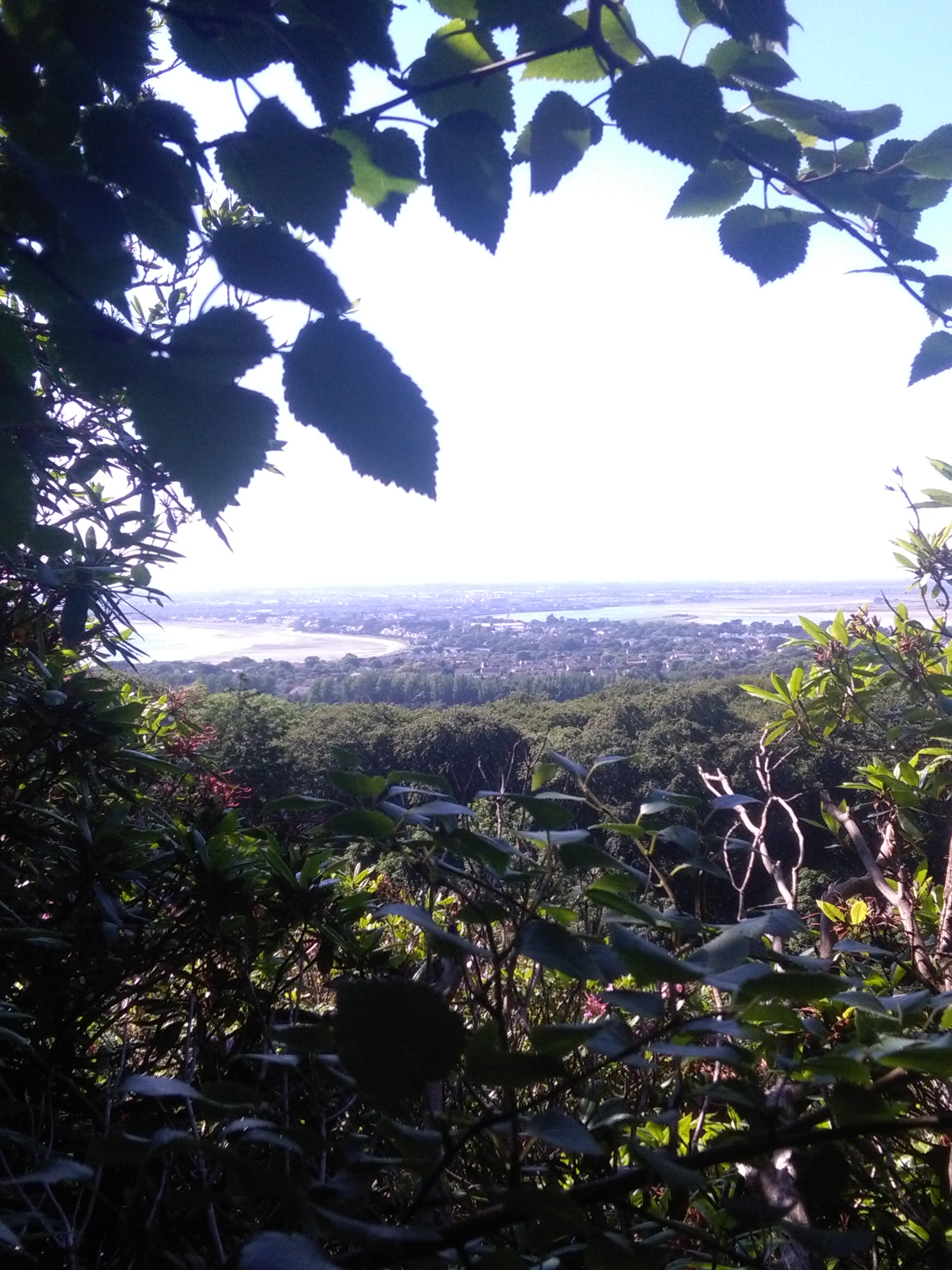
Sutton as seen from Howth Head.

== Sports and leisure activities ==
There is dinghy sailing off the coast at Sutton Dinghy Club, based within Sutton Creek. Golf can be played at Sutton Golf Club, with Howth and the Deerpark golf facilities nearby; footgolf and poc fada can also be played at Deerpark. Suttonians Rugby Football Club, at Station Road, provides for local rugby players and supporters. Sutton Tennis Club has 12 outdoor courts and five indoor squash courts; it is the biggest club for junior squash in Ireland. The local soccer club is Howth Celtic, with grounds located opposite St.Fintan's primary school on Carrickbrack Road. There is a local scout group which meets in St. Mary's Church of Ireland Parish Hall in Howth.

Red Rock is a trailhead for the Cliff Walk which navigates a large section of Howth Head and ends at Howth village. Shielmartin Hill is also readily accessible from Sutton.

== Buildings ==
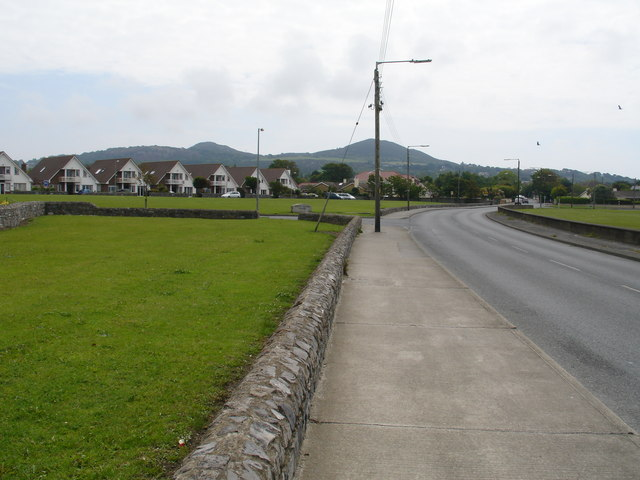
Santa Sabina Manor Housing estate on Carrickbrack Road

One of the area's oldest buildings, the fifteenth century Corr Castle, is located at Sutton North near the Howth Road entrance to Offington housing estate. The castle previously formed part of the Howth Park Racecourse which stretched over large parts of Sutton and Howth.

The area is also home to one of Ireland's Martello Towers at Red Rock which is now a private residence. Also located in Red Rock is Sutton Castle, the former home of the Jameson family, and later became the residence of Belgian businessman Albert Luykx, made famous during the Irish arms trial. It subsequently became Sutton House Hotel and then Sutton Castle Hotel, before being converted in 2003 to private residences.

Several notable Georgian houses are located in Sutton including two imposing 4-storey Georgian era houses now called Beachfield House (previously called Devonshire Terrace) as well as the nearby Sealawn House (1830s) which was owned by John Pentland Mahaffy. Adjacent to these is a terrace of Howth stone-faced fisherman's cottages called Martello Terrace. The end house of this terrace used to house the old Sutton coast guard station but has now been converted into residential accommodation.

The old tram shed which was used by the Hill of Howth Tramway is located near Sutton Station, but is now a private residence which is part of a modern housing development.

The Luí na Gréine (English:Sunset) granite standing stone monument is located on the seaside pathway at Sutton strand and was designed by Cliodhna Cussen and erected in the mid-2000s.

== Education ==
Sutton has three mixed primary schools: the Burrow School, on the Dublin Road between Sutton Cross and Howth, St. Fintan's National School, on Carrickbrack Road, and the primary part of Sutton Park School. There are also three secondary schools: St. Fintan's High School (a Catholic boys' school, which is technically in the parish of Baldoyle), Santa Sabina Dominican College (a.k.a. Santa Sabina) (girls) and the senior part of Sutton Park School (mixed).

== Religion ==
Sutton comprises a parish in the Roman Catholic church, St. Fintans, within the deanery of Howth, with a parish church at the base of Howth Hill, adjacent to Santa Sabina School, at the junction of Greenfield Road and Church Road.

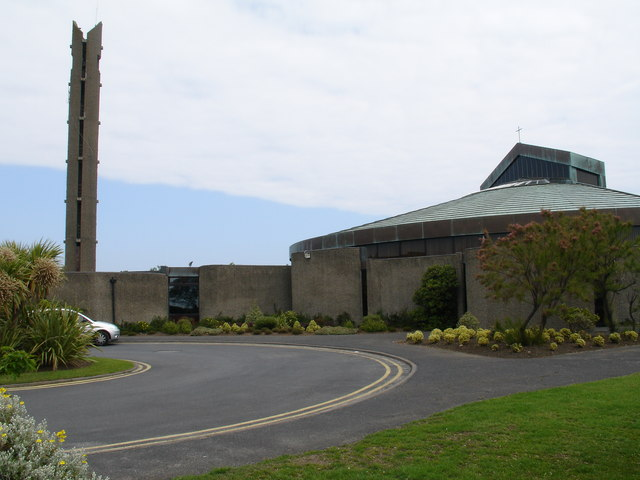
St. Fintans church

There is also a Methodist church at the junction of Church Road and Howth Road.

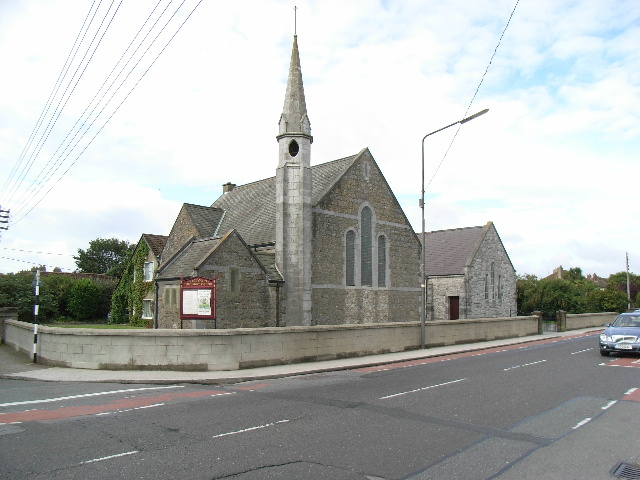
Sutton Methodist Church

Sutton contains one of Dublin's main burial grounds, St. Fintan's, which is divided into two parts, "old" and "new." The former contains a ruined chapel dating from early Norman times, and the latter, an abandoned keeper's cottage.

Uphill from the older graveyard, in a wooden hut on private grounds, is the still-flowing holy well of St. Fintan.

== Administration ==
Sutton is part of the Dublin Bay North Dáil Éireann constituency, having previously been part of Dublin North-East for many years.

The area is also within the Howth-Malahide local electoral area in the jurisdiction of Fingal County Council, and there is also an electoral division known as "Sutton".

== Notable people ==
- Bernard "Bunny" Carr, radio announcer, TV host and founder of Carr Communications
- Ian Dempsey, radio and television presenter
- Jim Fitzpatrick, artist, Celtic style work but also created the iconic two-tone portrait of Che Guevara, on Burrow Road
- Gerry Gannon, one of Ireland's biggest property developers, part owner of the K Club and MD of Gannon Homes, formerly building, for example, Clongriffin housing estate, and with extensive land holdings in the area
- Kevin Grogan, former Ireland and Manchester United youth player
- Sheelagh Harbison (1914–2012), Irish medieval historian
- Patrick Hillery, former President of Ireland; lived in Sutton for many years until his death in 2008
- Aidan Kearney (rugby union), former Leinster and Ulster rugby player
- Frank Kearns, owner of Rockschool and founder of Irish Rock group Cactus World News
- Ian Keatley, Irish and former Munster and Leinster professional rugby player
- Alice Lawrenson, 19th-century Irish gardener, lived at Sutton House (later Sutton Castle)
- Phil Lynott, lived with his family at Glen Corr on Burrow Road in the 1980s, and is buried in St. Fintan's Cemetery
- Philomena Lynott, mother of Phil Lynott
- John Pentland Mahaffy, lived at Sea Lawn house on Shielmartin Road between 1886 and 1897
- Larry Mullen, Jr., drummer with rock group U2
- Marie Perolz, Irish nationalist and feminist
- Vogue Williams was educated at Santa Sabina school

== See also ==
- List of streets and squares in Dublin
