= R105 road (Ireland) =

Regional road in North Dublin

R105 road
- Bóthar R105
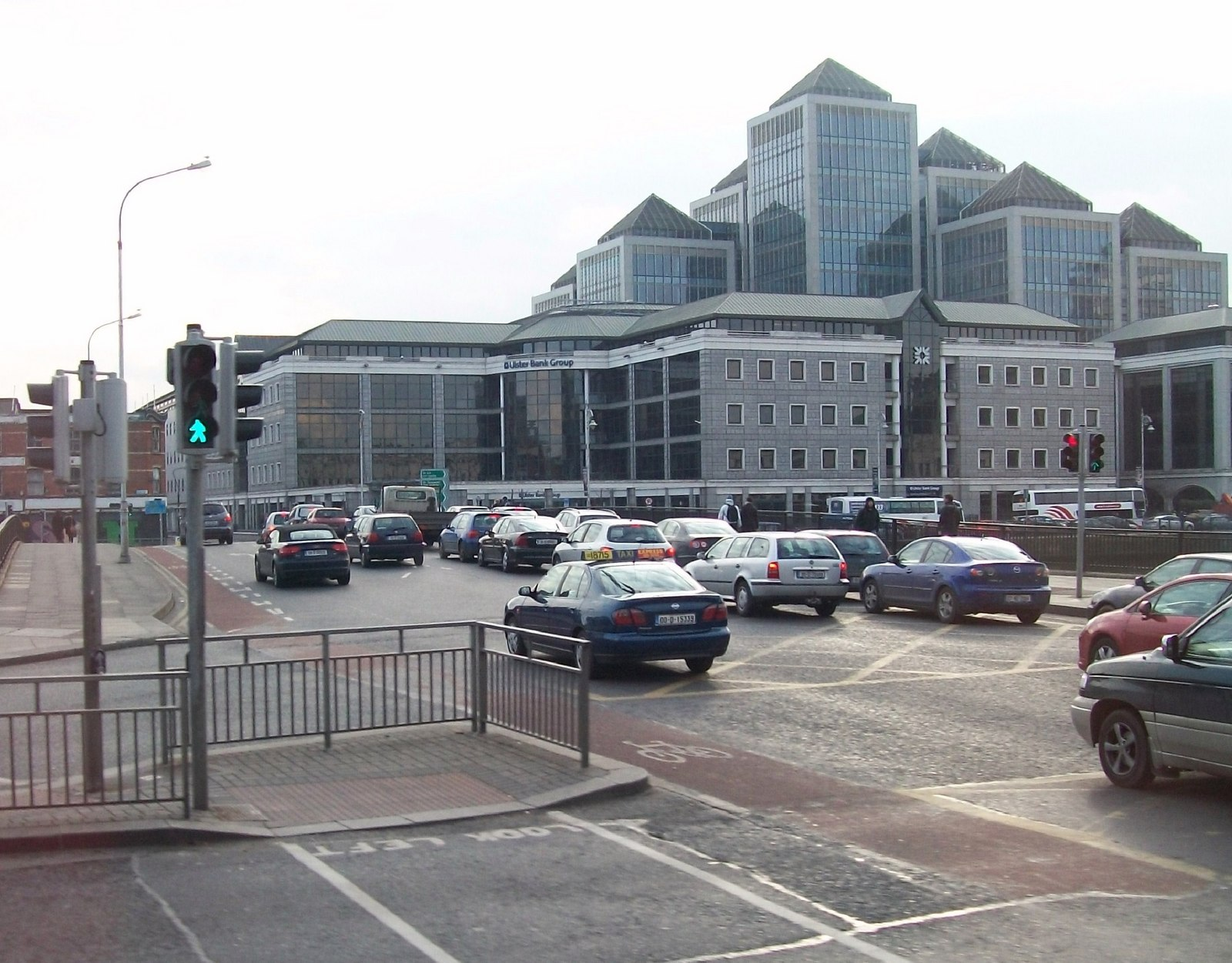
- The Talbot Memorial Bridge carries the R105 over the River Liffey

Route information
- Length: 23 km (14 mi)

Location
- Country: Ireland
- Primary destinations: Dublin; R138 (O'Connell Street); Eden Quay; Beresford Place; Memorial Road; Talbot Memorial Bridge; George's Quay; Burgh Quay; Amiens Street; North Strand Road; Crosses Royal Canal at Newcomen Bridge; Annesley Bridge Road; Fairview; Howth Road; Fingal; Dublin Road; Sutton Cross; Howth Road; Harbour Road; Abbey Street; Thormanby Road; Carrickbrack Road; Greenfield Road; R106 (Sutton Cross)

Highway system
- Roads in Ireland; Motorways; Primary; Secondary; Regional

The R105 road is a regional road in north Dublin, Ireland. It travels from the city centre to Howth, and loops at both ends; the road fully encircles Howth Head. Along the way, the road passes through Fairview, the western end of Clontarf, Killester, Raheny, the coastal edge of Kilbarrack and Sutton. Its biggest component is Howth Road.

The official description of the R105 from the Roads Act 1993 (Classification of Regional Roads) Order 2012 reads:

R105: Dublin - Howth, County Dublin

Between its junction with R138 at OConnell Street in the city of Dublin and its junction with R106 at Sutton Cross in the county of Fingal via Eden Quay, Beresford Place, Memorial Road (and via Talbot Memorial Bridge, Georges Quay and Burgh Quay), Amiens Street, North Strand Road, Annesley Bridge Road, Fairview and Howth Road in the city of Dublin: Dublin Road, Sutton; Sutton Cross, Howth Road; Harbour Road and Abbey Street at Howth; Thormanby Road, Carrickbrack Road and Greenfield Road in the county of Fingal.

The road is 23 kilometres (14 mi) long.

== See also ==
- Roads in Ireland
- National primary road
- National secondary road
- Regional road
