= Sutton Creek (Ireland) =

Part of Dublin Bay between Bull Island and Howth Head

Coordinates: 53°22′55″N 6°06′30″W

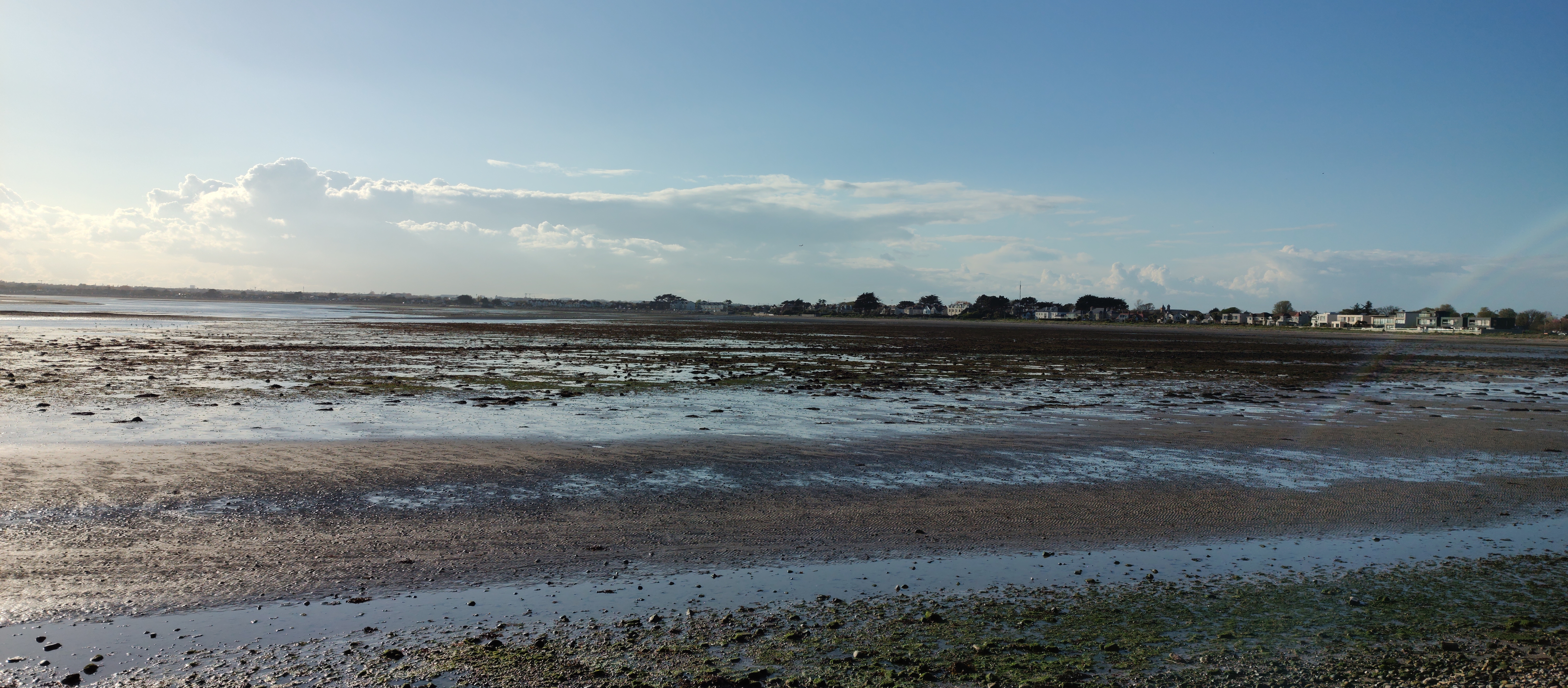
- View to south

- Location within Dublin
- Location: Dublin, Ireland
- Part of: Dublin Bay
- Settlements: Sutton, Dublin

Sutton Creek is part of Dublin Bay that lies between the southwestern part of Howth Head and the northeast end of Bull Island. It forms the southern coastline of Sutton and is bounded by Dublin Road, Greenfield Road and Strand Road.
