= Howth Head =

Peninsula northeast of Dublin, Ireland

Coordinates: 53.37923°N 6.07201°W

Ceann Bhinn Éadair
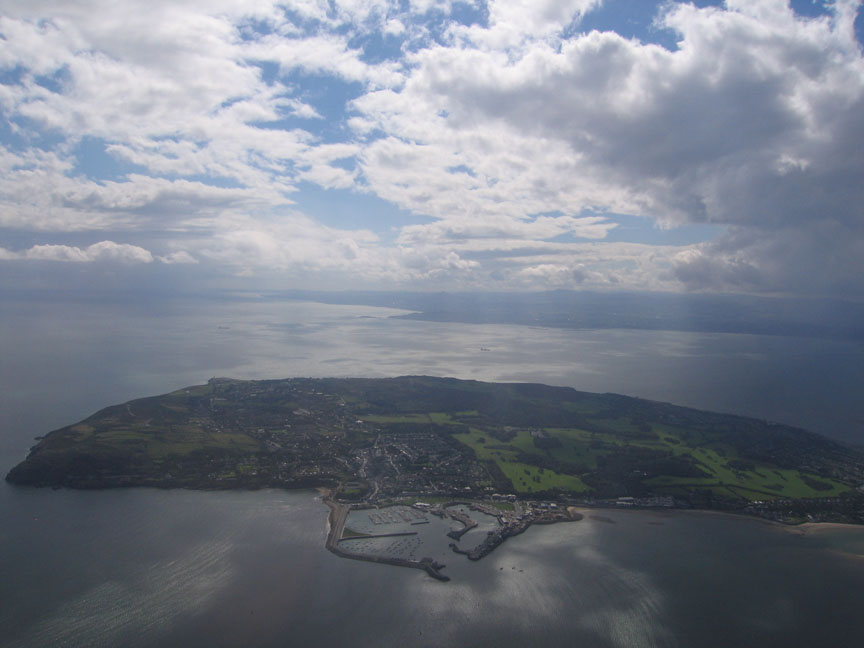
- Aerial view of Howth Head looking south.

- Location within Dublin Location within Ireland

Geography
- Location: Ireland
- Adjacent to: Irish Sea
- Area: 11 km^{2} (4.2 sq mi)
- Highest elevation: 171 m (561 ft)
- Highest point: Ben of Howth

Administration
- Ireland
- County: Dublin

Demographics
- Population: 8,294 (2016)
- Pop. density: 754/km^{2} (1953/sq mi)

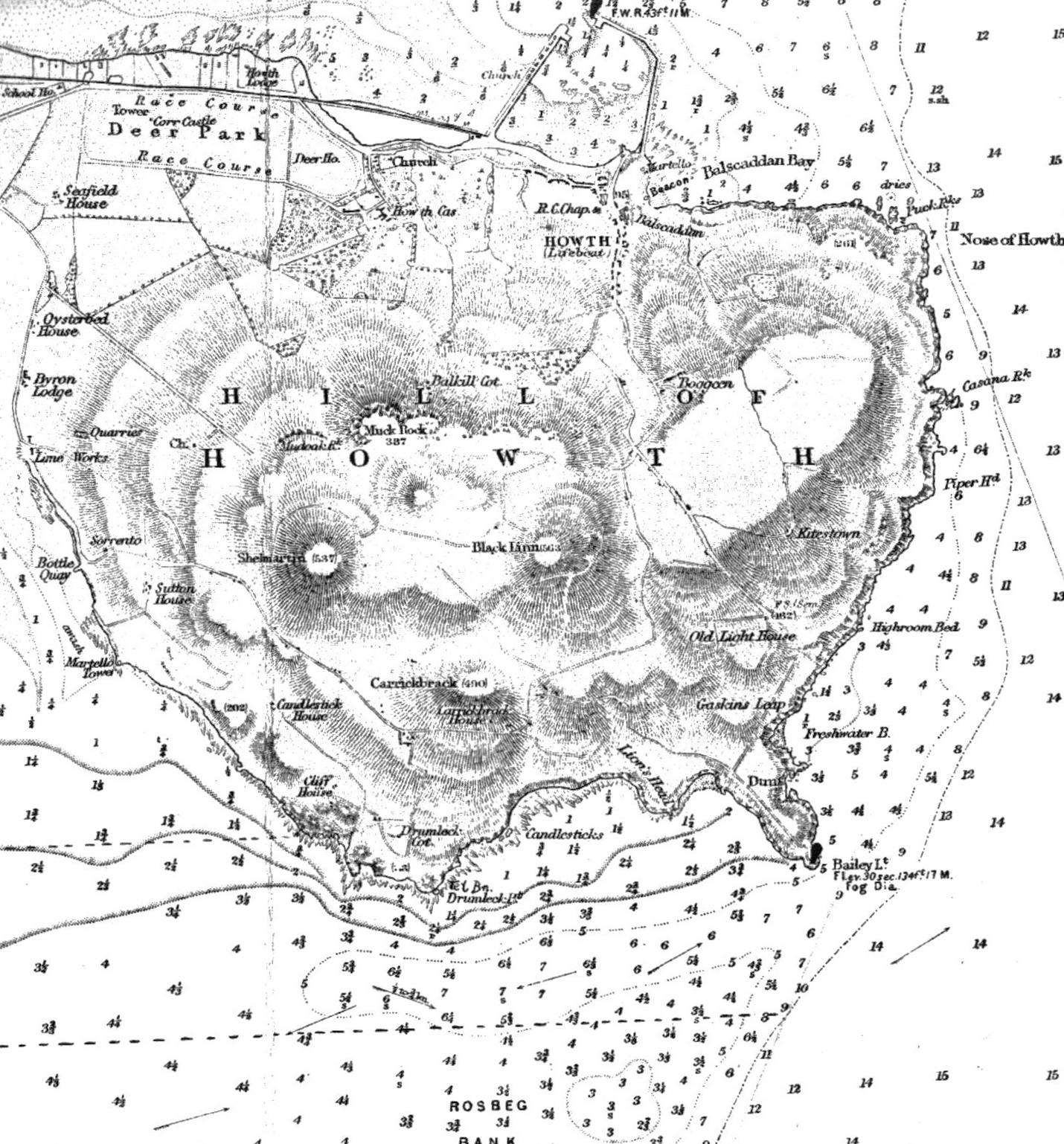
Map of Howth Head with peaks

Howth Head (/ˈhoʊθ/ HOHTH; Ceann Bhinn Éadair in Irish) is a peninsula northeast of the city of Dublin in Ireland, within the governance of Fingal County Council. Entry to the headland is at Sutton while the village of Howth and the harbour are on the north-eastern face. Most of Howth Head is occupied by the Hill of Howth, though there are other regions, such as the tombolo at Sutton, extensive beaches on the northern shores, and small ones in other parts. The Baily Lighthouse is on the southeastern part of Howth Head. Nearby are the districts of Baldoyle and Portmarnock, and adjacent is the nature reserve of North Bull Island.

== History ==
The earliest mention of the peninsula may be on a map attributed to Claudius Ptolemy, where it was called Edri Deserta or in Greek Εδρου ἐρῆμος (Edrou Heremos, Edar's isolated place). Here it was portrayed as an island, but it is not clear if this was due to actual separation from the headland or inaccurate information available to the cartographer. Other writers think that Edrou was actually Lambay Island, from Greek ἑδρα (hedra) "sitting place [for ships]".

The peninsula has been occupied since at least the 3rd millennium BC, with two middens found, and a dolmen dating back to around 2200 BC. It features in several Irish legends. A fishing settlement developed at Howth, and the area developed under the Norman St. Lawrence family, who owned most of Howth Head from the late 1100s until the 20th century, with the residual main estate sold in 2019. In the 19th century, electric tramlines to and over Howth Head made the whole hill more accessible.

== Location and topography ==
Originally an island, Howth Head is connected to the mainland via a narrow strip of land, or tombolo, and forms the northerly bound of the great crescent of Dublin Bay, roughly corresponding to Dalkey Hill and Killiney Hill in the south.

Most of the headland is hilly, with peaks such as the 171 m Black Linn, by the Ben of Howth, on a side road beyond the Green Hill Quarries at the Loughereen Hills, Shielmartin Hill (163 m) overlooking Carrickbrack Road and Carrickbrack and Dun Hill. There are also craggy areas such as Muck Rock (Carrickmore), and Kilrock.

Howth has an extensive and varied coastline, and there are steep sea cliffs around parts, especially on the north coast. Key points on the coast, clockwise from Sutton, include Cush Point, Claremont Strand, the small headland at Howth village, Balscadden Bay, Kilrock, the Great and Little Baily, Lion's Head, Doldrum Bay, the Needles, Drumleck Point, Red Rock and Sutton Strand.

Due to the shape of the landform, and its rocky nature, with thin soil covering, Howth features multiple streams and several fast-running streams, due to hard rock under a thin soil layer. These include the Bloody Stream, Coulcour Brook, the Boggeen Stream, the Offington Stream, the Whitewater Brook, the Balsaggart Stream, and the Carrickbrack and Santa Sabina Streams.

== Fauna and flora ==
The cliffs support a large colony of seabirds, notably razorbills, common guillemots, fulmars, kittiwakes and cormorants. The scrubland above supports several heathland species including skylarks, meadow pipits, common whitethroats, linnets, stonechats and whinchats. The most commonly seen birds of prey are kestrels, peregrine falcons and common buzzards.

Gorse grows in many places on the headland. Fires are frequent during dry summers. Thirty-one non-native plants were recorded in 2018 from Howth Head.

== Transport ==
There are two railway stations on or near the head. Sutton station is on the northern edge of the tombolo between Sutton and Baldoyle, and Howth station is on the head in the village of Howth. Both are served by Dublin Area Rapid Transit trains and have regular services to and from Dublin city centre. Historically the Hill of Howth Tramway ran between the stations around the head between 1901 and 1959. Additionally Dublin Bus routes serve the headland. A full road network accesses most parts, although some are only reachable by some of the many footpaths.

== Gallery ==
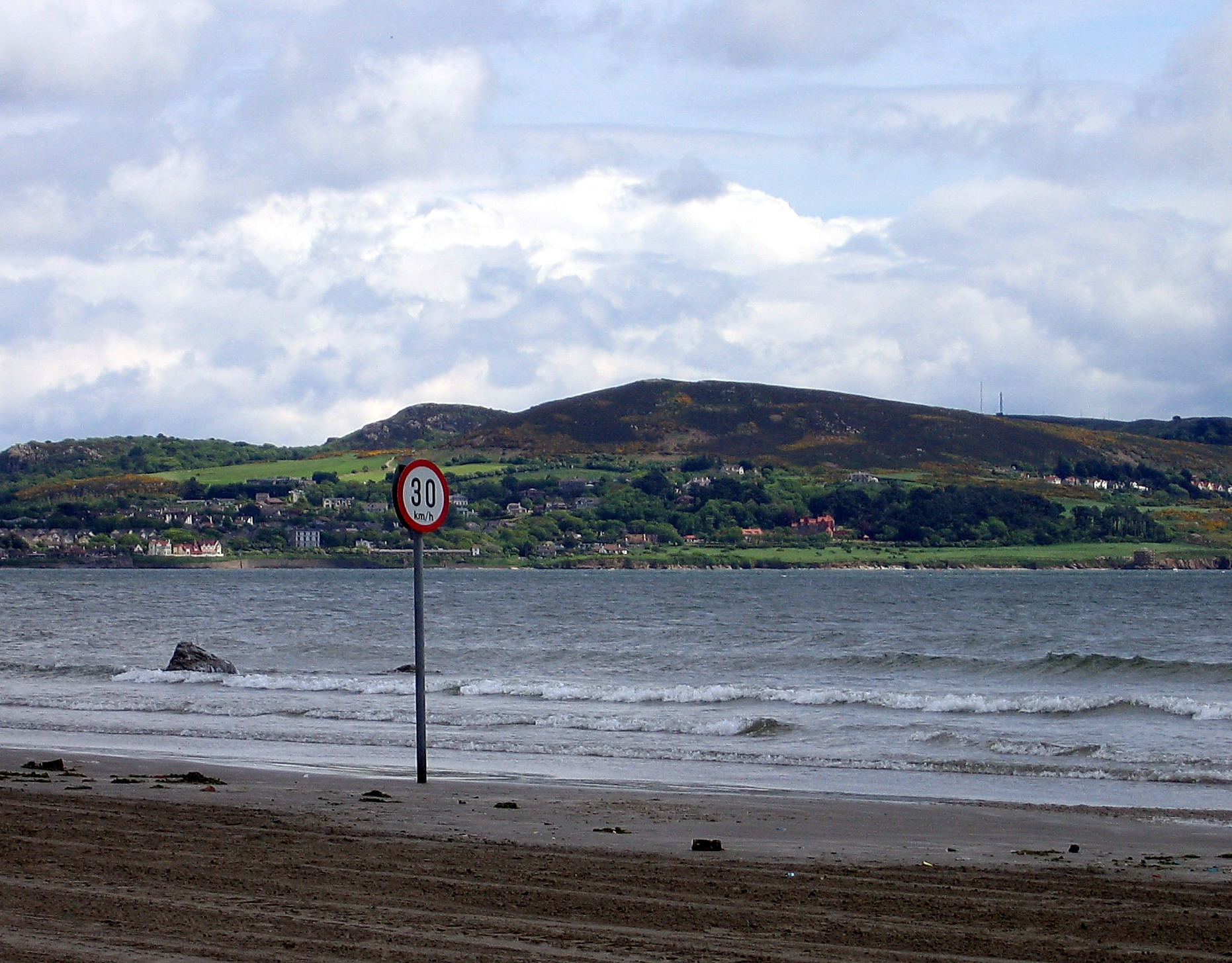
Howth Head viewed from on the North Bull Island in Dublin Bay

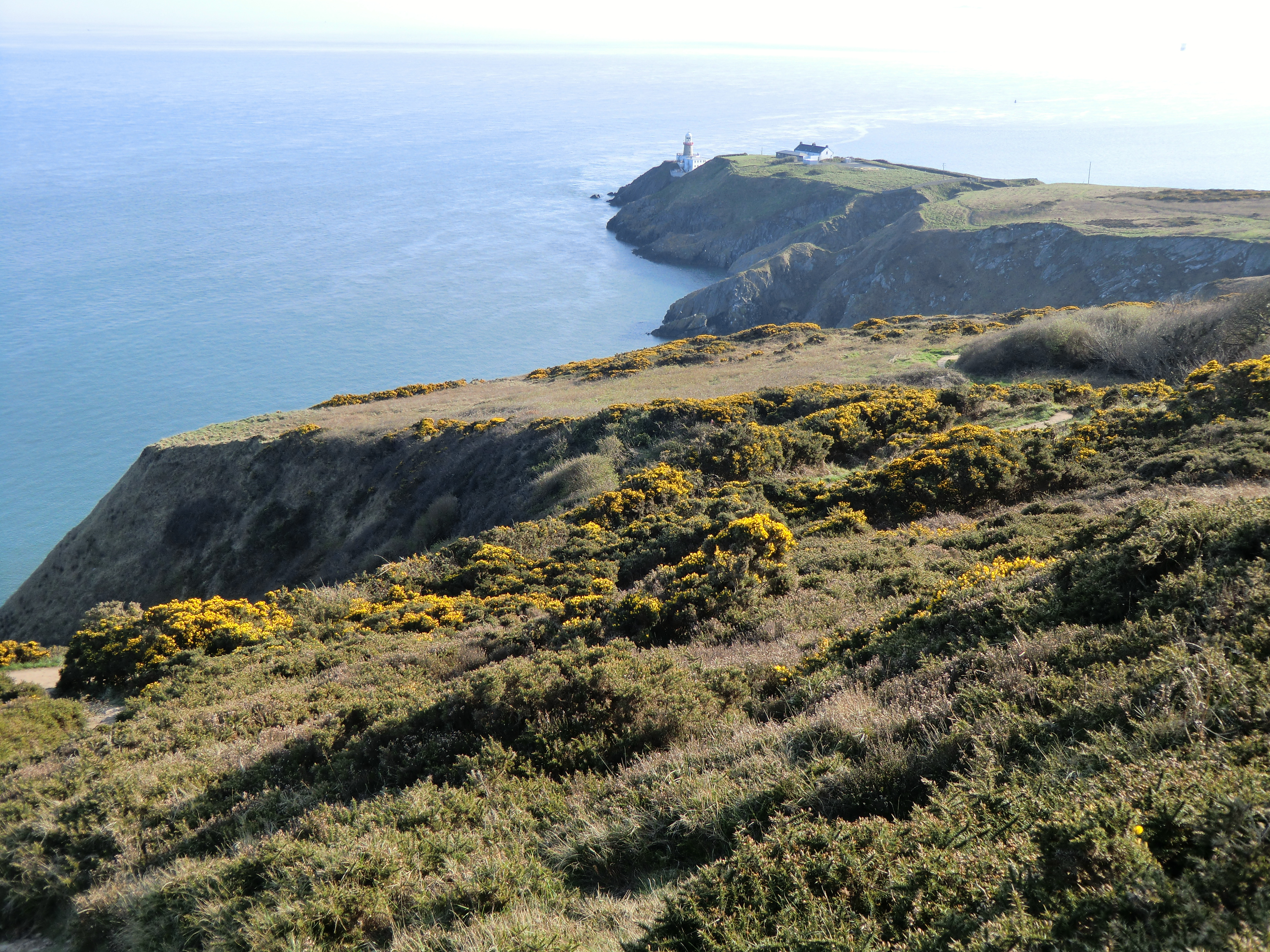
Cliffs at Howth Head with Baily Lighthouse in the distance

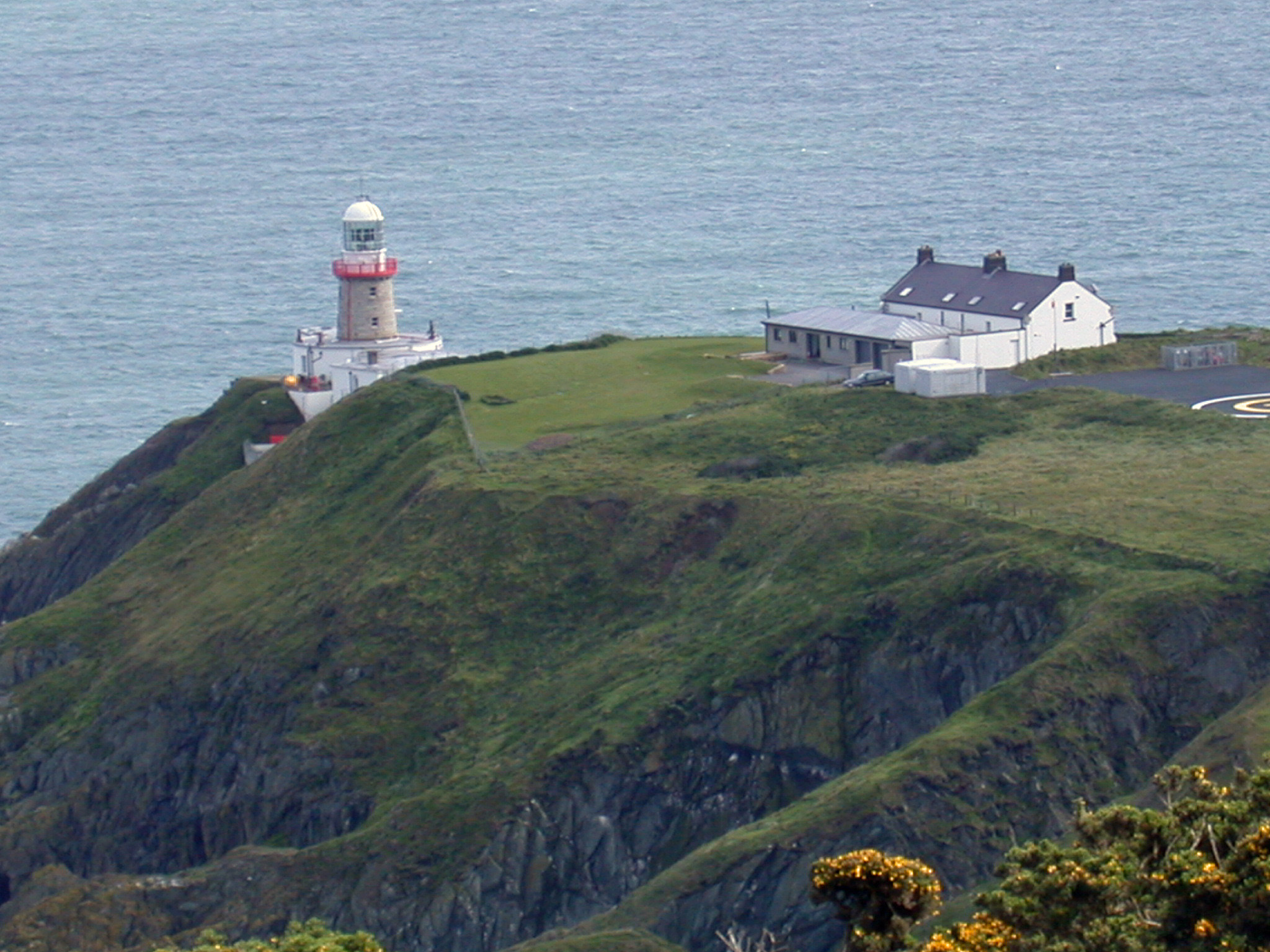
Baily Lighthouse at the southeast end of Howth Head

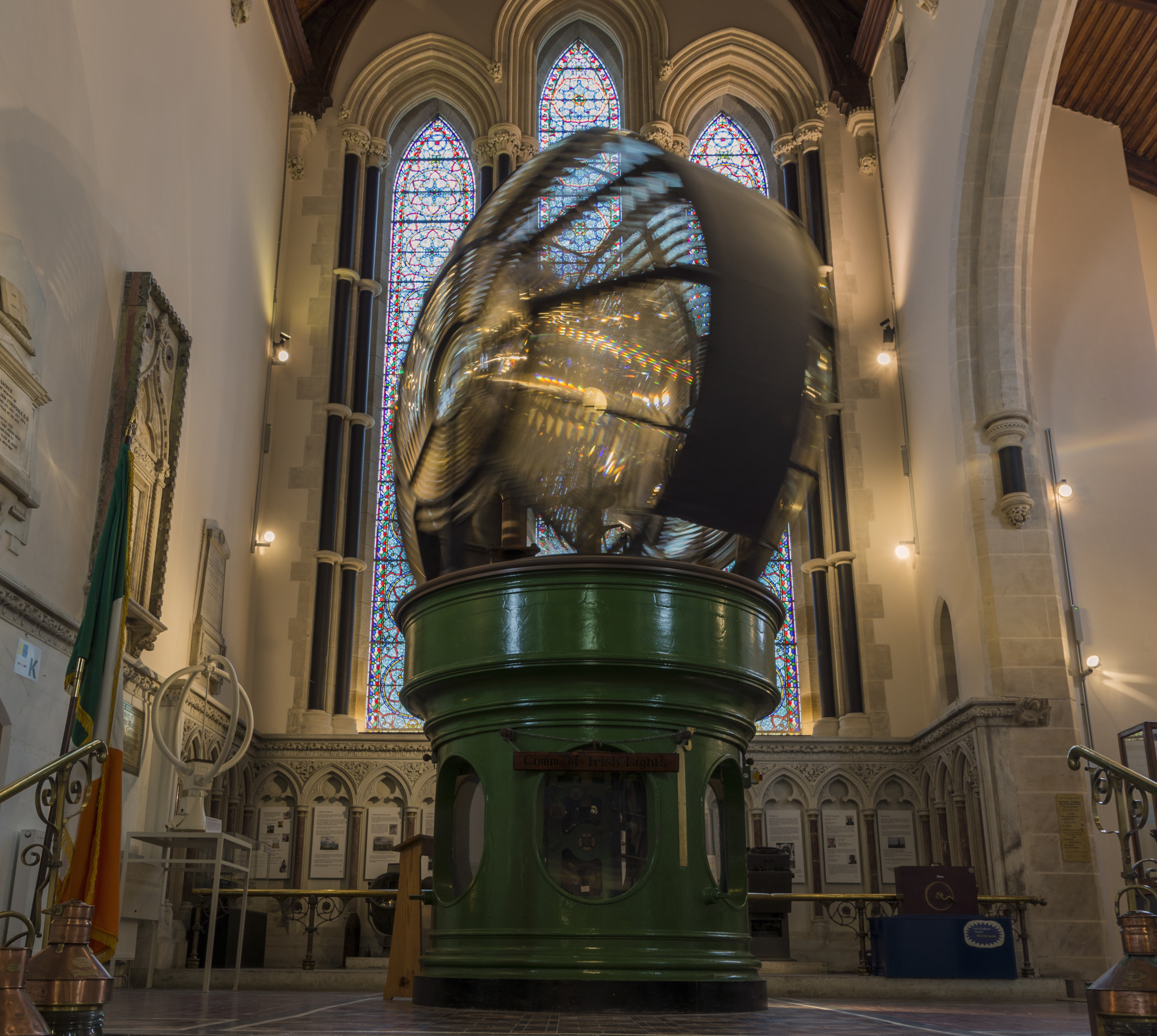
Optic from Baily lighthouse, installed in 1902 and removed in 1972 when the lighthouse was modernised

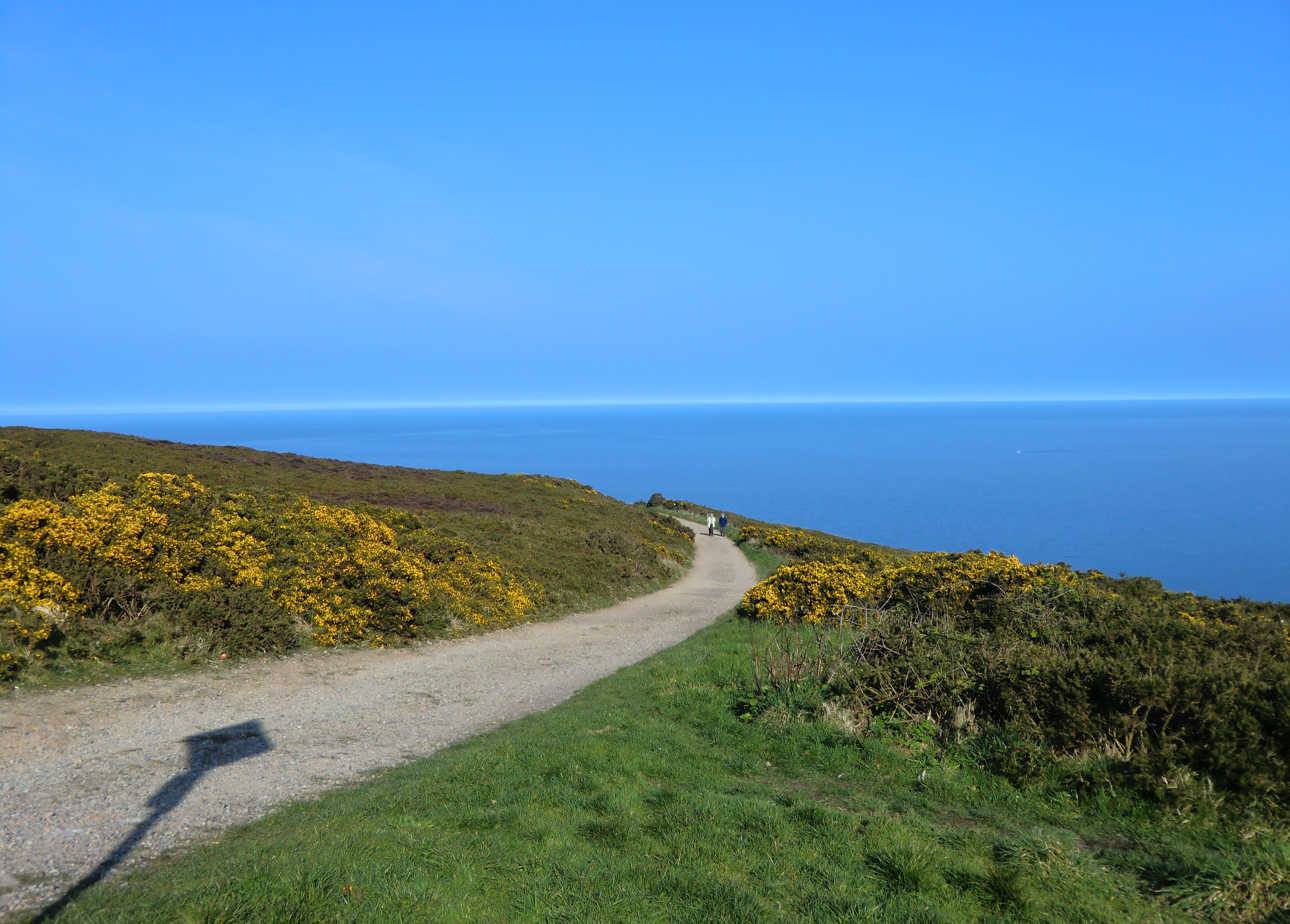
Walk on Howth Head

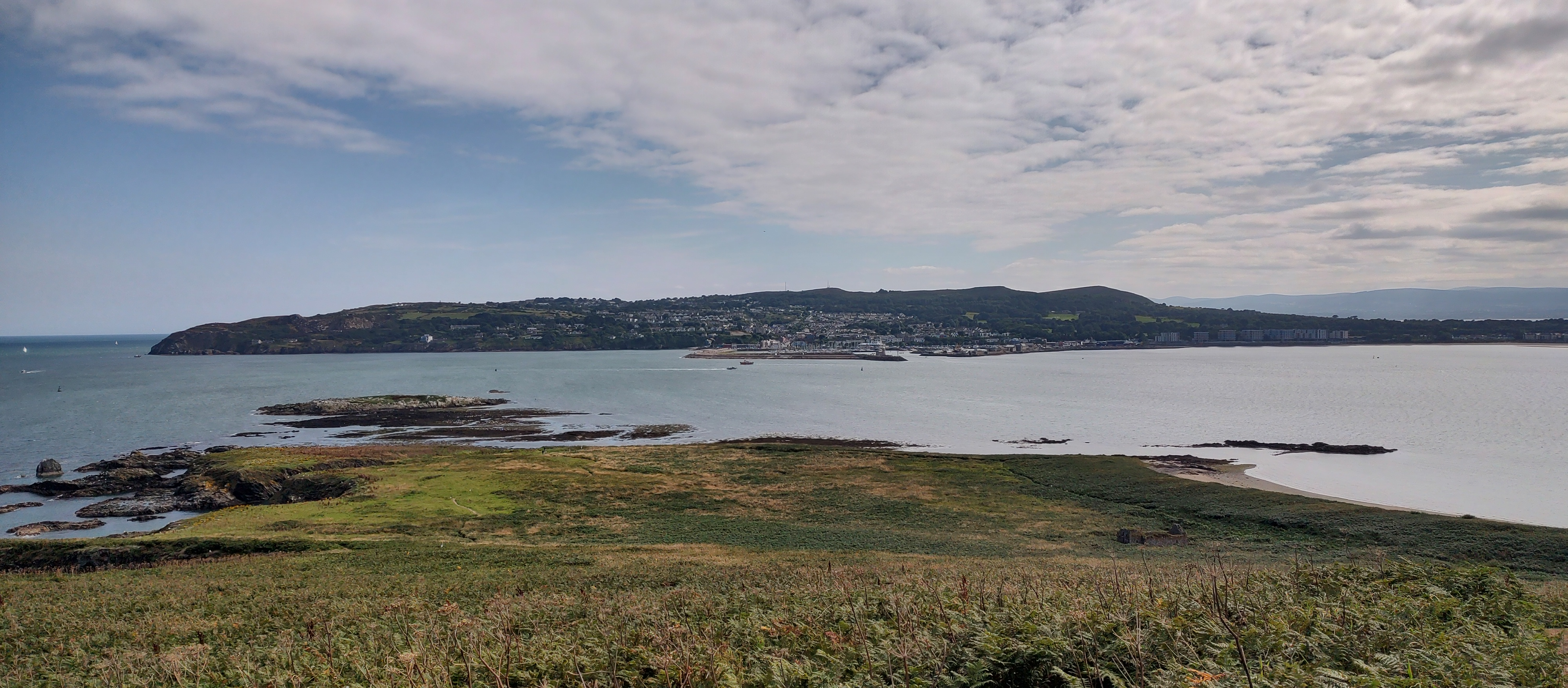
Howth Head as viewed from Ireland's Eye, near the summit

== Leisure ==
Howth is a popular destination for day-trippers from the capital, accessible by car, bus and one of the northern termini of the Dublin Area Rapid Transit train system (DART). Hikers can choose from a wide range of routes, including the Cliff Walk, the Cliff Path Closed Loop, or making for the ancient cairn on one of Howth's several summits. On clear days, the Wicklow Mountains can be seen, with Dublin city below. Slieve Donard, an 852-metre peak in Northern Ireland may also be visible - a distance of 90 km (56 mi). Quite frequently, Snowdon (1,085 m) in Snowdonia National Park in Wales can also be seen - a distance of 138 km (86 mi).

== Cultural references ==
Howth Head is the location where Leopold Bloom proposes to Molly in James Joyce's Ulysses. In the short story 'Eveline', another work by James Joyce from the collection Dubliners, it is mentioned that Eveline and her family once had a picnic on the Hill of Howth. Howth Head is also central to Joyce's final work, Finnegans Wake, in which one of the principal characters, HCE, is, among other things, representative of the mountain.

Howth Head is mentioned in the lyrics of the title track of Kate Bush's 1989 album, The Sensual World: '...took six big wheels and rolled our bodies / off of Howth Head and into the flesh, mmh, yes...'. The song is inspired by Molly Bloom's soliloquy in Joyce's Ulysses.

The peninsula also features in the backdrop of multiple paintings by Irish artist William Orpen (1878-1931) and by American artist James Whistler.

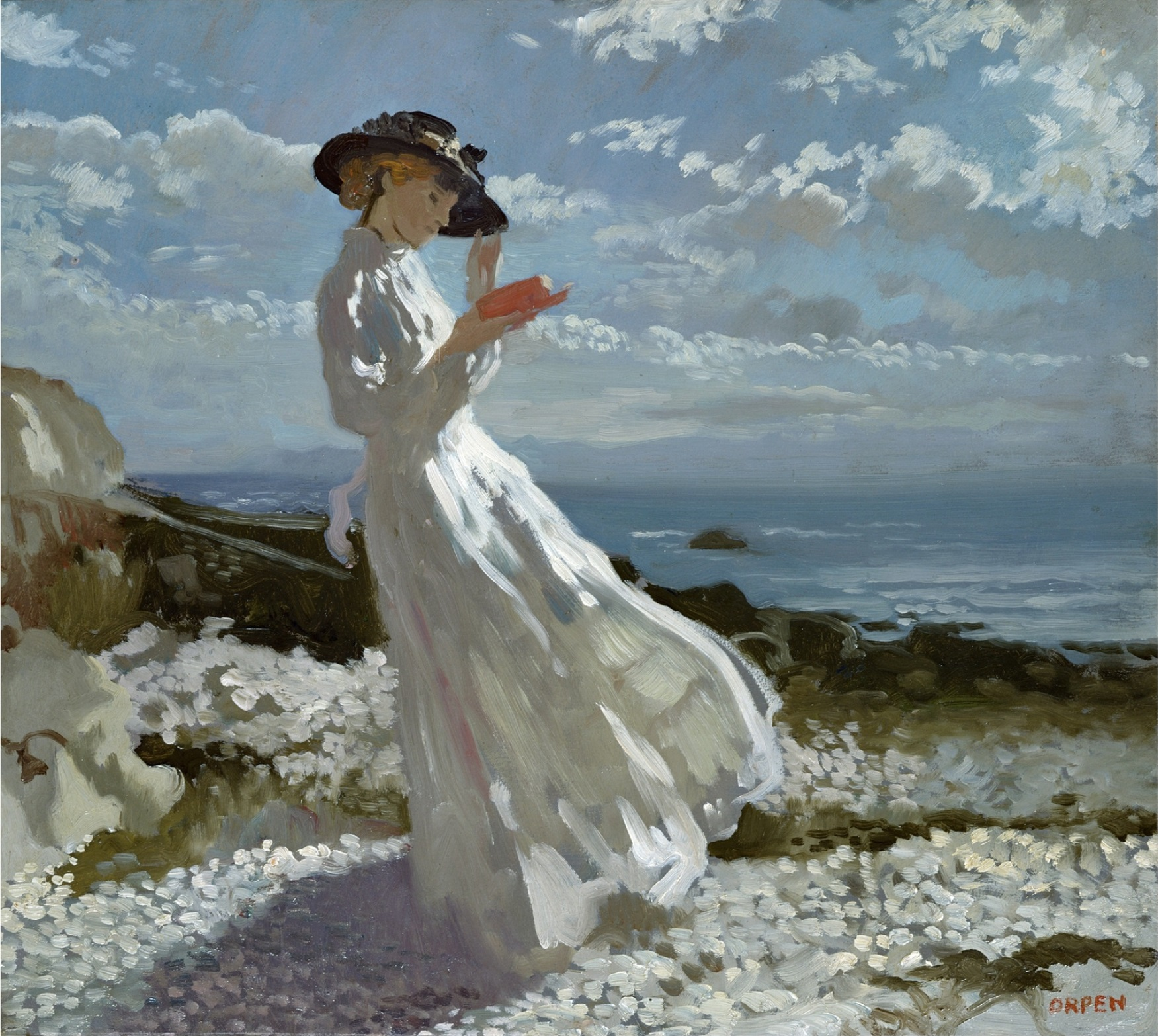
Grace Reading at Howth Bay (c. 1900) by Sir William Orpen

Howth Head is the setting of two scenes from the Tony Award-winning musical "Once."
