= Clontarf and Hill of Howth Tramroad =

Former light rail service from Dublin to Howth Harbour

The Clontarf and Hill of Howth Tramroad Company (C&HoHTCo) operated a tram service from central Dublin via Dollymount in Clontarf to Howth Harbour in the Dublin area of Ireland from 1900 to 1941. Formed in the 1880s, it was a separate entity from the other Dublin tramways, notably the Dublin United Tramways Company (DUTC), but worked closely with the latter, who owned the line as far as Dollymount, for most of its operating existence.

== History ==
=== Early stages ===
Tram service for the Howth area was first proposed in 1883, by the Great Northern Railway (Ireland) (GNR), to bring more passengers to Howth and / or Sutton railway stations. The Clontarf and Hill of Howth Tramroad Company (C&HofHTCo) raised the idea of a circular line around Howth Hill. Neither idea progressed, not least because the slopes of the hill were too steep to be safe for horses, or practical for steam power, though a line may have been considered using a viaduct over Balscadden Bay, just beyond Howth village, to keep gradients within the range of steam propulsion.

In 1890, the C&HofHTCo sought an Order in Council to allow it to build a tram line from Howth Harbour to Dublin's fish market. The formal application was made on 31 January 1890, for a gauge of 3 feet, with lines running from Mary's Lane past Halston Street to Capel Street, and then along Parnell Street and Summerhill, through Ballybough, Fairview, Killester and Raheny, then along the coast through the fields of Kilbarrack to Sutton and Howth. While this matter did not proceed, the company developed two new proposals after the DUTC received permission to electrify its lines. The proposed lines, at a gauge of 5 feet 3 inches, were from the DUTC's terminus in the Clontarf area, via the hamlet of Raheny-on-the-Strand and Sutton, to Howth Harbour, and from the Summit on Howth Hill down past Howth Station and the Howth Estate to the gates of Claremont. The GNR made a two-part counter proposal, seeking to electrify their railway line from Amiens Street Station to either Sutton or Howth, and to provide a circular tram line, with connections at Sutton Cross and Howth, and with the trams able to move all the way to Dublin's centre. The C&HofHTCo added a third element to their proposal, for a tram line from Sutton Cross to the Summit, and the GNR then objected to the whole package, and won. The GNR then received permission for its proposed circular line, which became the Hill of Howth Tramway, and dropped the idea of electrification from the peninsula to Amiens St., and so of trams through-running around Howth and to the city centre.

=== Service establishment ===
Clontarf and Hill of Howth Tramroad Act 1898
- Act of Parliament
- Parliament of the United Kingdom
- Long title: An Act for making a tramroad in the County of Dublin and for other purposes.
- Citation: 61 & 62 Vict. c. clxxxii

Dates
- Royal assent: 2 August 1898

Text of statute as originally enacted

Having considered both a coastal route to Howth, probably working with the DUTC, and an inland one, via Raheny, the Clontarf and Hill of Howth Tramway Company eventually secured permission for a line from the DUTC's depot at what had become Dollymount in Clontarf to Howth Harbour, and this was enshrined in the Clontarf and Hill of Howth Tramroad Act 1898 (61 & 62 Vict. c. clxxxii). The bill for this act had its second reading on 3 March, and on 18 July was the subject of debate about the possible insertion of a clause requiring the purchase of rolling stock from England, the promoters having expressed a preference for buying from the DUTC, or failing that, from the United States. The bill was returned to the House of Lords on 26 July, and later completed its passage.

Leading businessman, and key player in the DUTC, William Martin Murphy, was an active member of the board of the C&HofHTCo up to this time. He secured the contract to lay the new line, and having resigned from the board, proceeded with laying and equipping, which eventually cost £71,624.

Much of the line construction was straightforward, allowing for the challenges of building at the water's edge, but there were difficulties with Lord Ardilaun, the Guinness heir, whose estate of St. Anne's ran to the coast where the line was to be laid. At the time, there was no coastal road, and Lord Ardilaun sought multiple conditions in return for removing objections to the project. He received most of what he sought, including the provision that the trams would not stop along the margin of his property, and line construction proceeded. The line opened on 26 July 1900.

=== Operations ===
The company purchased twelve large cars (larger than those of the DUTC, for example) for its operations, each seating 74 passengers, 29 inside and 45 on the upper deck. The enclosed lower deck had a driver's cab, and separate areas for each of First, Second and Third Class. The journey from Nelson's Pillar to Howth took 45 minutes, and the price for much of the operating period was 2 shillings and 6 pence.

In 1918, the route number 31 was allocated to the line (the numbers were assigned clockwise from the No. 1 route to Ringsend), a number now used by Dublin Bus services to Howth, albeit on the original inland route via Raheny, rather than the final route.

=== Decline and winding-up ===
During the 1930s, the line became unprofitable, and when the GNR put forward a proposal to run a competing bus service on the Howth Road, and launch a bus to Malahide, the Board of the C&HofHTCo offered to end their service if the GNR agreed not to run a bus to Malahide. The line ceased operation on 29 March 1941, with the last tram to Howth, No. 294, departing Nelson's Pillar at 11.45 p.m, driven by Dick Ward. The company was wound-up on 1 July 1941, and the remaining tram cars were transferred to the DUTC's Dalkey route, where they served until that line closed in 1949.

== External sources ==
- Howth, County Dublin, North Dublin Round Table, 1981: McBrierty, Vincent J., "Howth" - specifically, Chapter 7, "Transport" by James M.C. Kilroy, and particularly pp. 93–97.
