= Dublin tramways =

Transport system in Dublin, 1871–1959

- The last DUTC tram to run in Dublin city, needed police protection from souvenir hunters on its final trip to the Blackrock Depot

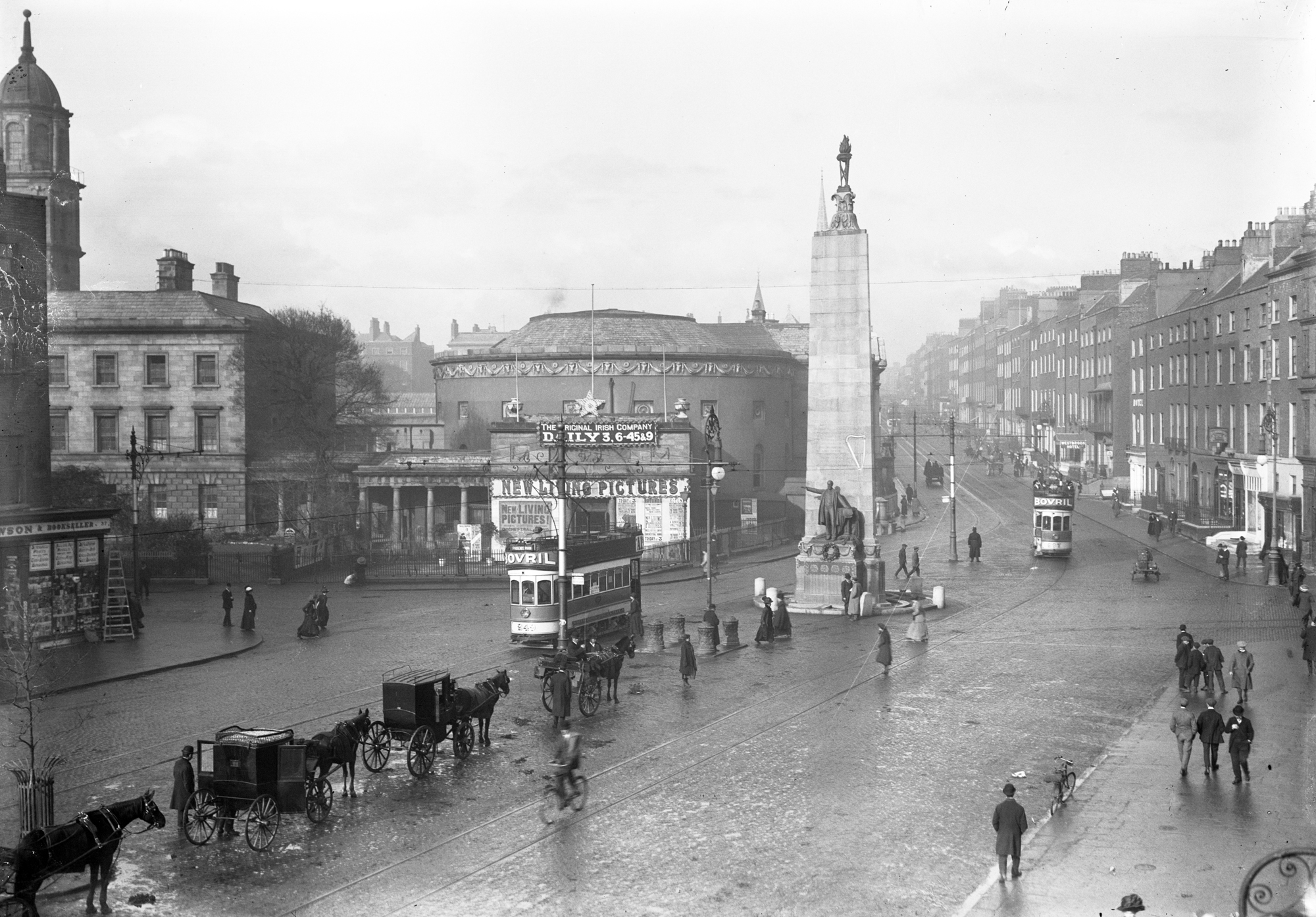
- Trams passing the Parnell Monument in 1913

Overview
- Locale: Dublin, Ireland
- Transit type: trams
- Number of lines: 23 (1928)
- Annual ridership: 88,530,737 (1937)

Operation
- Began operation: 1872; 154 years ago
- Ended operation: 1949; 77 years ago
- Operator: Dublin United Tramways Company

Technical
- System length: over 60 mi (97 km)
System map
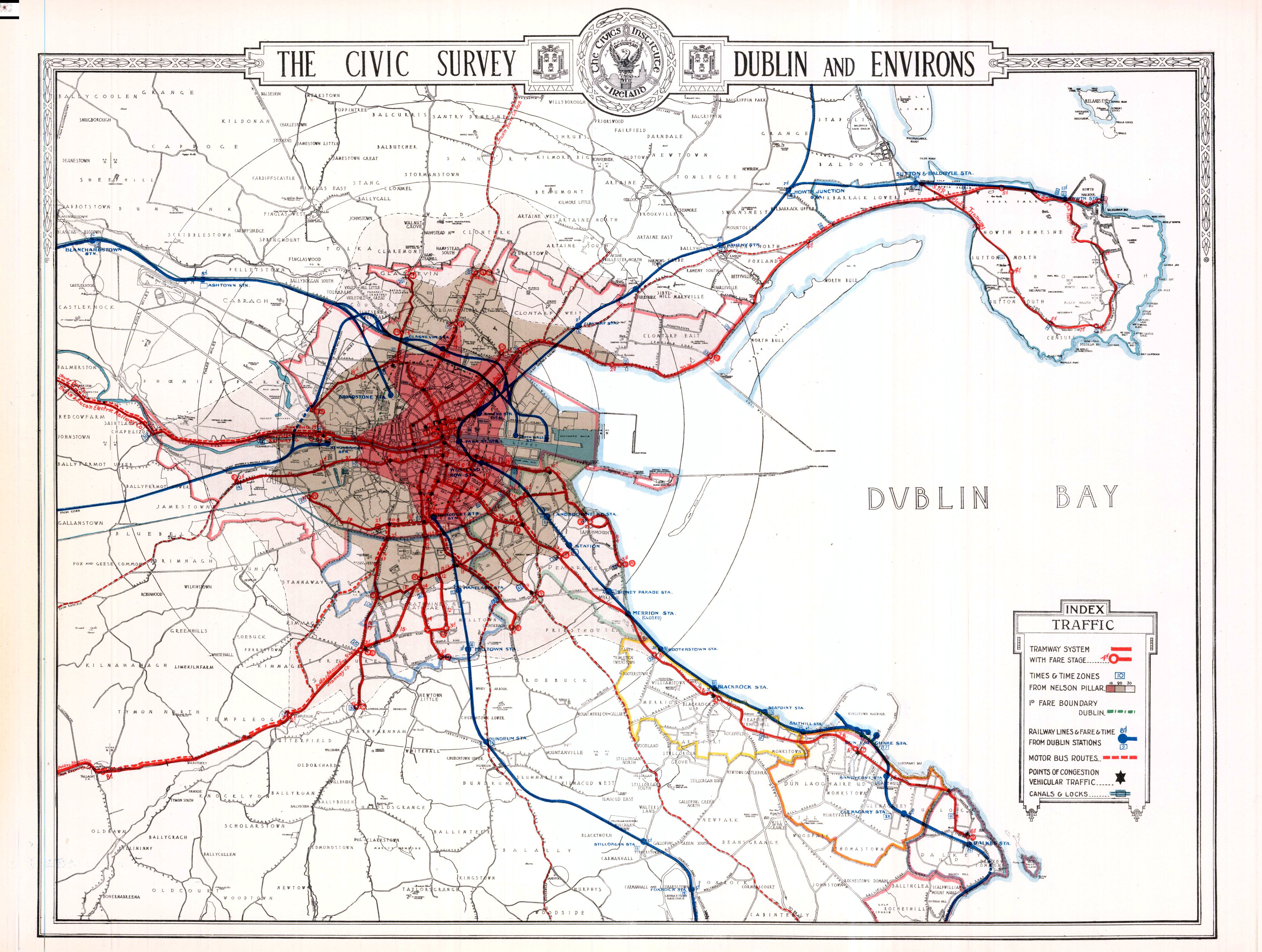
Trams as Dublin's main form of transport – early 1920s, with detail of all tram routes, fares and zones, times to stops, and the long-distance lines, several kilometres out from the city, as well as the very few bus routes, and the "heavy" rail system

Dublin tramways was a system of trams in Dublin, Ireland, which commenced line-laying in 1871, and began service in 1872, following trials in the mid-1860s. Established by a number of companies, the majority of the system was eventually operated by forms of the Dublin United Tramways Company (DUTC), dominated for many years by William Martin Murphy. Most of the services ran within the city centre and near suburbs, with the majority of major suburbs served (and many of the remainder handled by mainline rail). Additionally, there were two longer-range services, one reaching the "excursion" destination of Poulaphouca Falls, and two services concerning Howth.

At its peak, with over 60 miles (97 km) of active line, the system was heavily used, profitable and advanced in technology and passenger facilities, with near-full electrification complete from 1901. Heavy usage lasted from the late 19th century into the 1920s. The tram system was also central to the Dublin Lockout, which caused major distress within the city.

Elements of the system went out of service from the mid-1920s, in part overtaken by the bus. The decline of the trams accelerated in the 1940s and the last trams ran on 9 July 1949 in Dublin city and in 1959 on Howth Head, near Dublin.

== History ==
=== Background and legislation ===
The tram concept arrived in Ireland in the early years of railway development, and the first related projects concerned attempts to link major city train stations with a light railway. The legislation on this topic was the model for the first of the Irish Tramways Acts (which differed somewhat from those of England and Wales, or Scotland), the Tramways (Ireland) Act 1860 (23 & 24 Vict. c. 152). One feature of this law was that each establishment of a tramway operation required approvals including those of the Irish Privy Council, and an act of the Imperial Parliament, onerous and expensive provisions. This and other provisions argued to be impractical led to modification by the Tramways (Ireland) Amendment Act 1861 (24 & 25 Vict. c. 102).

Dublin Tramways Act 1871
- Act of Parliament
- Parliament of the United Kingdom
- Long title: An Act to authorise the construction of Tramways in and near the city of Dublin; and for other purposes.
- Citation: 34 & 35 Vict. c. lxxxviii
- Territorial extent: United Kingdom

Dates
- Royal assent: 29 June 1871
- Commencement: 29 June 1871 (Note: The Acts of Parliament (Commencement) Act 1793.)
Other legislation
Amended by	Dublin Tramways Act 1873; Dublin United Tramways Act 1905

Status: Partially repealed

Text of statute as originally enacted

Dublin Tramways Act 1873
- Act of Parliament
- Parliament of the United Kingdom
- Long title: An Act to empower the Dublin Tramways Company to construct new tramways; and for other purposes.
- Citation: 36 & 37 Vict. c. xci
- Territorial extent: United Kingdom

Dates
- Royal assent: 7 July 1873
- Commencement: 7 July 1873
Other legislation
Amended by	Dublin United Tramways Act 1905

Status: Partially repealed

Text of statute as originally enacted

Tramways (Ireland) Amendment (Dublin) Act 1876
- Act of Parliament
- Parliament of the United Kingdom
- Long title: An Act to amend the Tramways (Ireland) Act, 1860, and the Tramways (Ireland) Amendment Act, 1861, as regards the application of the same to the county and the county of the city of Dublin.
- Citation: 39 & 40 Vict. c. 65
- Territorial extent: United Kingdom

Dates
- Royal assent: 15 August 1876
- Commencement: 15 August 1876
Other legislation
Amended by	Statute Law Revision Act 1883; Local Government (Ireland) Act 1898

Status: Partially repealed

Text of statute as originally enacted

Dublin Tramways Act 1878
- Act of Parliament
- Parliament of the United Kingdom
- Long title: An Act to empower the Dublin Tramways Company to construct further new Tramways; and for other purposes.
- Citation: 41 & 42 Vict. c. cxlix
- Territorial extent: United Kingdom

Dates
- Royal assent: 4 July 1878
- Commencement: 4 July 1878
Other legislation
Amended by	Dublin United Tramways Act 1905

Status: Partially repealed

Text of statute as originally enacted

The next relevant legislation was the special act, the Dublin Tramways Act 1871 (34 & 35 Vict. c. lxxxviii), setting up the first company to actually deliver service, and the associated similarly named Dublin Tramways Act 1873 (36 & 37 Vict. c. xci), finalising initial routes and other rules. In parallel the main legislation was modified by the Tramways (Ireland) Amendment Act 1871 (34 & 35 Vict. c. 114). The Tramways (Ireland) Amendment (Dublin) Act 1876 (39 & 40 Vict. c. 65) – also known as the Dublin Tramways Act 1876 – followed, and the Tramways (Ireland) Amendment Act 1881 (44 & 45 Vict. c. 17) provided for the formation of tramway ventures by way of simplified procedures. In the meantime, the Relief of Distress (Ireland) Act 1880 (43 Vict. c. 4) allowed for local authority support of tramway ventures (previously some provisions existed for such support for railways only).

From 1889, a new focus came to legislation on this topic, beginning with the Light Railways (Ireland) Act 1889 (52 & 53 Vict. c. 66), also known as "Balfour's Act", which aimed to encourage tram-like or light rail systems in poorer areas, and increased the potential for government to support such projects. With more guarantees from local authorities, more light rail systems were developed, with Dublin's extensive network just part of a total of 581 miles (935 km) by 1906.

=== Formation ===
The first Dublin trams were horse-drawn. In the early years, there were several operators, including (with the abbreviations by which they were often known):

- The Dublin Tramways Company (DTC), which acquired the rights of the City of Dublin Tramways Co. and the Rathmines omnibuses, and started laying lines in 1871, commencing service to Terenure on 1 February 1872; notably, in the run-up to launch and for some time after, there were concerted objections to the placing of rails in or on the road, with fears about carriage accidents (a similar process occurred later when steam trams were proposed), and some of these objections were continued during and after construction
- The North Dublin Street Tramways Company (NDST), formed 1875, with a line from Nelson's Pillar to Drumcondra commencing in 1877
- The Dublin Central Tramways Company (DCT), formed 1878, with authority to build a line from College Green to Rathfarnham with branches to Ranelagh, Rathgar, Rathmines and Clonskeagh, and with a line commencing 22 June 1879, from Nelson's Pillar to Terenure via Harold's Cross

Dublin United Tramways Company Act 1881
- Act of Parliament
- Parliament of the United Kingdom
- Long title: An Act to dissolve and re-incorporate the Dublin United Tramways Company (Limited), and to amalgamate therewith the Dublin Tramways Company, the North Dublin Street Tramways Company, and the Dublin Central Tramways Company; and for other purposes.
- Citation: 44 & 45 Vict. c. cxl
- Territorial extent: United Kingdom

Dates
- Royal assent: 18 July 1881
- Commencement: 18 July 1881
Other legislation
Amended by	Dublin United Tramways Act 1905

Status: Partially repealed

Text of statute as originally enacted

By 1880, with many of the major districts of Dublin being served by the above three tram companies, William Martin Murphy, a founding shareholder of the Dublin Central Tramways Company, founded the Dublin United Tramways Company (DUTC) in January 1881, with himself as manager, and his father-in-law as chairman, and arranged the merger of the three companies under the Dublin United Tramways Company Act 1881 (44 & 45 Vict. c. cxl), uniting 32 "route miles" under DUTC control.

- The Dublin Southern Districts Tramways Company (DSDTC), formed by the Dublin Southern District Tramways Act 1878 (41 & 42 Vict. c. clix)
- The Blackrock and Kingstown Tramway (BKT), formed by the Blackrock and Kingstown Tramways Act 1883 (46 & 47 Vict. c. civ)

Dublin Southern District Tramways Act 1893
- Act of Parliament
- Parliament of the United Kingdom
- Long title: An Act to authorise the use of mechanical power upon the undertaking of the Dublin Southern District Tramways Company to enable that company to acquire the undertaking of the Blackrock and Kingstown Tramways Company and for other purposes.
- Citation: 56 & 57 Vict. c. ccxx
- Territorial extent: United Kingdom

Dates
- Royal assent: 24 August 1893
- Commencement: 24 August 1893
Other legislation
Amended by	Dublin United Tramways Act 1905

Status: Partially repealed

Text of statute as originally enacted

In 1878, the DSDTC was acquired by the Imperial Tramways Company, who secured the Dublin Southern District Tramways Act 1893 (56 & 57 Vict. c. ccxx) allowing them to purchase the BKT, and to use electrical and mechanical power. In mid-1896, the combined operation of these two companies, including the recently acquired legal authority to use electricity, was sold to the British Thomson-Houston Company, which almost immediately in turn sold it to the DUTC.

=== Electrification and peak operation ===
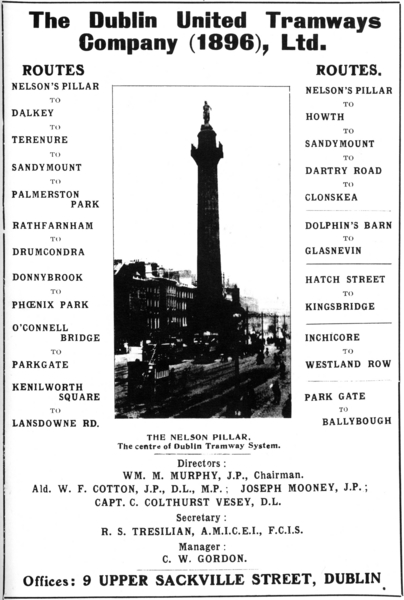
A DUTC advertisement, c. 1900

Discussions towards electrification began in the late 1890s, but this was opposed by Dublin Corporation, among others. An American panel also opposed the overhead line in densely populated areas.

The Dublin United Tramways Company, with the acquisition of the Dublin Southern Tramways, which had earlier the same year started the first electrical tram line in Ireland, reversed long-standing policy favouring horse-drawn trams, and, having reorganised as the Dublin United Tramways Company (1896) Ltd., proceeded with a rapid electrification. As part of a deal with Dublin Corporation, the DUTC agreed to pay them £500 per route mile for 40 years and a minimum of £10,000 per year when the system was fully electrified. Also included as part of the deal, the DUTC agreed not to charge more than one penny from the Pillar to any city boundary less than 1.5 miles (2.4 km) away.

By January 1901, the entire city system, which covered about 60 miles (97 km) to 66 miles (106 km), was electrified and the system has 280 trams, including a special directors' tram that was used by William Martin Murphy among others to inspect the system. In 1911 the system had 330 trams.

At its peak, the system was known as technically innovative and was described in 1904 as "one of the most impressive in the world", so that representatives of other cities from around the world came to inspect it and its electric operation.

=== The Lockout ===
In 1913, the Dublin tram system was central to the Dublin lock-out, when DUTC members walked off the job over the refusal of William Martin Murphy to allow some workers to join the Irish Transport and General Workers' Union

=== Decline and closure ===
The DUTC opened its first bus route in 1925, progressively replacing the trams until the closure of their last route, the No. 8 to Dalkey, on 10 July 1949. According to social historian Erika Hanna, "the last Dublin city tram made its way to the terminus at Nelson's Pillar with some nostalgia, but not much regret." According to the Minister for Justice Seán Mac Eoin, "A force of 60 guards, including 2 superintendents, 1 inspector, 8 sergeants and 3 motor-cyclists[,] were placed on duty over the route," but they were unable to protect the last tram from damage by souvenir hunters.

Following the Transport Act 1944, control of the DUTC was vested in the newly formed Córas Iompair Éireann (CIÉ). At the time the DUTC had 113 trams remaining.

The Hill of Howth Tramway was transferred to CIÉ in 1958 and closed on 31 May 1959. It was the last tram to run in Ireland until the Luas tram system opened in 2004.

=== Reasons for decline ===
A number of factors combined in the decline of Dublin's tram system. The advent of buses and large-scale competition meant that buses often ran the same routes as the trams and would jump in front to "grab" customers, and buses were able to move into Dublin's expanding hinterland more quickly and at less cost than the trams, and the belief that trams were outdated and old technology, leading to declining use. Meanwhile, the DUTC's takeover of many bus operators left the DUTC with a large number of buses, which were used and expanded to areas of Dublin with no tram service, and buses eventually became the DUTC's core business. There was a belief that buses were cheaper to run than trams and that the system was in a poor state of repair. Britain's 1930 Royal Commission on Transport similarly actively advised against trams and for their replacement with buses.

The rising affordability of the motorcar for the middle-classes also pre-empted the tram system's closure, as noted by Hanna:

As the trams were gradually stopping, Dublin was also witness to another profound shift in urban mobility with the arrival of mass motoring in the years after World War II. In 1924, there had only been 10,947 'mechanically propelled vehicles' registered in Dublin, rising to 23,364 in 1938. By 1960, there were 85,297 vehicles of all kinds registered in the city.

=== After closure ===
After closure, the system was still being discussed in the Dáil until at least 1960 when the issue of removal of the old tram tracks was raised.

== Lines and companies ==
The original tram-related legislation identified proposed lines by number, with a detailed route description, but these numbers were not widely used.

=== Dublin United Tramways Company ===
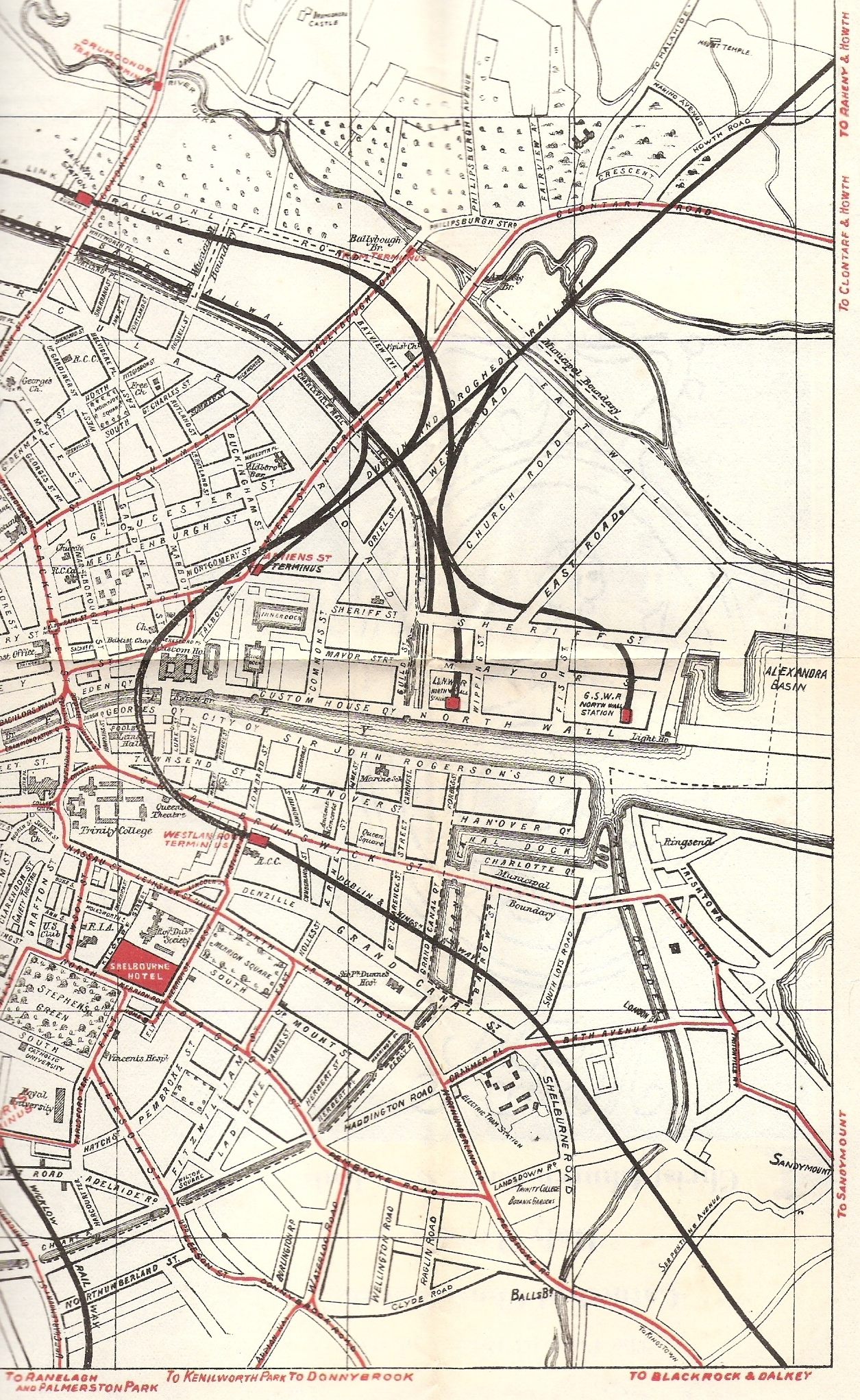
Map of central-eastern Dublin with the centre of the tram system and radiating lines in red and some termini, early 20th century

In 1910, there were seventeen Dublin United Tramways Company (DUTC) routes, each identified with a different symbol (since 1903), and named for their terminus stations. Route numbers replaced the symbols from 1918, rising from 1 at Ringsend to 30 for Dollymount (and 31 for Howth, shared with another company) in a circuit around the city. Both the original routes and their numbers were the basis of some of the later bus routes and numbers.

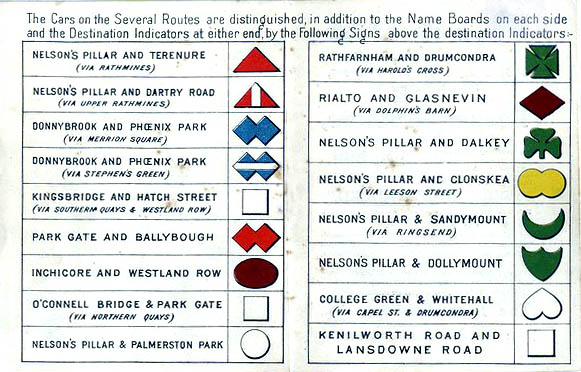
Routes in December 1910

Number	Route	Original operator	Opened	Electrified	Closed
1	Nelson's Pillar and Ringsend (Thomas St).	DUTC	18 March 1901	18 March 1901	26 March 1940
2	Nelson's Pillar and Sandymount (Sandymount Rd) via Ringsend	DUTC	18 March 1901	18 March 1901	26 March 1940
3	Nelson's Pillar and Sandymount (Strand Rd) via Ringsend	DUTC	18 March 1901	18 March 1901	26 March 1940
4	Nelson's Pillar and Sandymount (Strand Rd) via Bath Avenue	DTC	1 October 1872	14 January 1901	31 July 1932
5	Phoenix Park and Pembroke (Ballsbridge)		16 June 1919	16 June 1919	1 November 1928
6	Nelson's Pillar and Blackrock	DTC (Haddington Rd.), DSDT (Blackrock)	16 July 1879	16 May 1896 (from Haddington Rd.), 12 July 1898 (entire line)	9 July 1949
7	Nelson's Pillar and Kingstown	DTC (Haddington Rd.), DSDT (Blackrock), Kingstown (BKT)	August 1885	16 May 1896 (from Haddington Rd.), 12 July 1898 (entire line)	9 July 1949
8	Nelson's Pillar and Dalkey	DTC (Haddington Rd.), DSDT (Blackrock), Kingstown (BKT), Dalkey (DSDT)	19 March 1879 (originally 4 ft / 1,219 mm gauge Kingstown / Dalkey)	16 May 1896 (from Haddington Rd.), 12 July 1898 (entire line)	9 July 1949
9	Donnybrook and Phoenix Park via Merrion Square	DTC (Donnybrook), NDST (Phoenix Park)	14 March 1873 (Donnybrook), 10 December 1876 (Phoenix Park)	22 November 1898 (Phoenix Park), 23 January 1899 (Donnybrook)	6 June 1940
10	Donnybrook and Phoenix Park via Stephen's Green	DUTC	14 May 1906	14 May 1906	6 June 1940 (withdrawn on 21 March 1918, but reintroduced on 1 November 1928)
10	Finglas Road and Clonskea	DUTC	16 June 1919		1922
11	Whitehall and Clonskea via Leeson Street	DCT (Ranelagh to Clonskea), NDST (Drumcondra), DUTC (full route)	17 March 1879 (DCT), 1877 (NDST), 1903 (DUTC)	1 December 1899 (Clonskea), 9 November 1899 (Drumcondra), 7 September 1903 (Whitehall)	1939
12	Nelson's Pillar and Palmerston Park (Cnr Dartry Rd).	DCT (from College Green)	3 May 1879	24 October 1899	1 January 1939
13	Clontarf Rd. (cnr St. Lawrence's Rd.) and Westland Row railway station	DUTC	17 February 1918		21 March 1918
14	Nelson's Pillar and Dartry Road (Cnr Orwell Pk) via upper Rathmines	DUTC	27 January 1905	27 January 1905	31 October 1948
15	Nelson's Pillar and Terenure via Rathmines	DTC	1 February 1872	28 August 1899	31 October 1948
16 & 17	Rathfarnham and Drumcondra via Harold's Cross	Dublin Central Tramways Company (Rathfarnham), NDST (Drumcondra)	22 June 1879	9 November 1899	1 May 1939
18	Kenilworth Road and Lansdowne Road; Kenilworth Sq., Castlewood Ave., Belgrave Sq., Oakley Rd., Ranelagh, Leeson Pk., Appian Way, Waterloo Rd., Pembroke Rd., Lansdowne Rd.	DUTC	22 August 1898 (Rathmines to Ballsbridge horse tram)	12 October 1899	1 December 1940
19	Rialto and Glasnevin	NDST (Glasnevin), DUTC (Rialto)	10 December 1876 (Glasnevin), 20 May 1905 (Rialto)	4 December 1899	1939
20	Rialto and Glasnevin via Harcourt St.	NDST (Glasnevin), DUTC (Rialto)	10 December 1876 (Glasnevin), 20 May 1905 (Rialto)	4 December 1899	1939
21	Inchicore and Westland Row railway station	NDST	July 1878	4 September 1899	4 February 1940
22	Kingsbridge railway station and Harcourt St. railway station (corner of Hatch Street) via southern quays and Westland Row railway station	DTC	3 June 1872	16 January 1900	4 February 1940
23	Park Gate (the entrance to the Phoenix Park) and Ballybough	DUTC	1 October 1900	1 October 1900	16 April 1938
24	O'Connell Bridge and Park Gate via northern quays	DTC	16 April 1874	18 October 1899	16 April 1938
25	Bachelor's Walk and Lucan	DUTC	14 May 1928	14 May 1928	12 April 1940
26	Bachelor's Walk and Chapelizod	DUTC	27 May 1928	27 May 1928	12 April 1940
27	College Green and Drumcondra via Capel Street	NDST	1877	5 January 1900	21 March 1918, briefly reinstated in 1922 as route no. 27
28, 29, 30	Nelson's Pillar and Dollymount	DTC	1873	20 March 1898	1939
31	Nelson's Pillar and Howth	DTC (Dollymount), C&HoHT (Howth)	26 July 1900 (Howth)		29 March 1941

=== Non-DUTC operations ===
The Dublin region had six other tram companies in the early 20th century, two operating back-to-back lines to Lucan and Leixlip, and two similarly in the direction of Blessington and Poulaphouca. The remaining two operated lines relating to Howth, one circuiting Howth Head and one connecting the DUTC system to Howth village and harbour. The Lucan and Leixlip lines were absorbed by the DUTC in 1927, and the coastal service to Howth was part-DUTC for many years.

==== Clontarf and Hill of Howth Tramroad ====
The Clontarf and Hill of Howth Tramroad (C&HoHT), incorporated by a local act of Parliament, the Clontarf and Hill of Howth Tramroad Act 1898 (61 & 62 Vict. c. clxxxii), having considered both a coastal route and one via Raheny, had a single line, from Dollymount to Howth Harbour, which opened on 26 July 1900. It operated as an extension of the DUTC lines and shared operation with the DUTC, providing a route from Nelson's Pillar to Howth. It remained legally independent until closure, being wound up on 1 July 1941, but was operationally integrated with the DUTC, at least from the second decade of the century.

==== Dublin and Blessington Steam Tramway ====
The Dublin and Blessington Steam Tramway (DBST), (1888–1932), which ran from Terenure to Blessington, at a length of 15.5 miles (24.9 km) and with a total journey time of 1 hour and 25 minutes. Although the DBST connected with the DUTC system at Terenure, through-running was not allowed, as Dublin Corporation prohibited the operation of steam trams within the city.

The line was actually one of the first proposed in Ireland, as the Dublin and Baltinglass Tramway, but the costs of setting up operation under the early legislation were deemed prohibitive, and it was only after the Tramways (Ireland) Amendment Act 1881 (44 & 45 Vict. c. 17) that the promoters were prepared to develop the idea. The tramways was approved by the Dublin and Blessington Steam Tramway Order 1887.

Dublin and Wicklow county councils guaranteed this line, Kildare however, despite usage from the direction of Harristown (and Kilcullen and Ballymore Eustace) refused to be involved. It came under the administration of the Dublin County Surveyor in 1916, after years of profitable operation ended in 1914, and later under a committee of management. The potential inclusion of the line into the new Great Southern Railways entity was debated in the Dáil in 1924, but the government successfully opposed the idea. The DBST was closed by the Dublin and Blessington Steam Tramway (Abandonment) Act 1932 (No. 13), after years of being a burden on ratepayers, especially in the much more sparsely populated Wicklow.

===== Blessington and Poulaphouca Steam Tramway =====
The Blessington and Poulaphouca Steam Tramway (1895–1927), was a 4.5 miles (7.2 km) extension of the DBST from Blessington to Poulaphouca, built and operated by a separate company.

==== Dublin and Lucan Steam Tramway ====
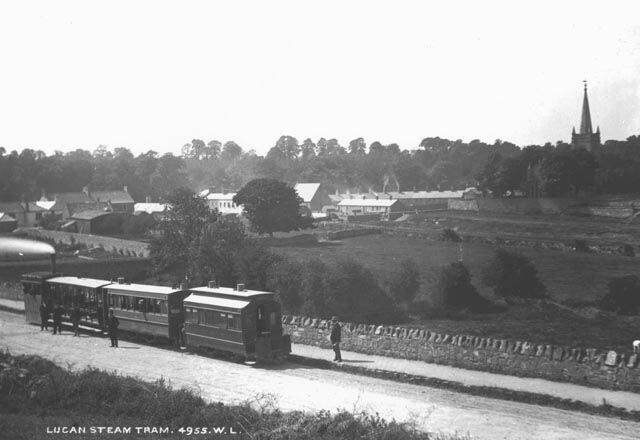
The Lucan steam tram, c. 1892

The Dublin and Lucan Steam Tramway (DLST), authorised by an Order in Council under the Tramways Act, which commenced in 1880, opened, mostly on a roadside reservation, to Chapelizod in June 1881, Palmerstown in November 1881, and to Lucan in 1883.

Under the Dublin and Lucan Electric Tramways Order 1900 (SR&O 1900/785), the DLST was electrified and regauged from 3 ft (914 mm) narrow gauge to 3 ft 6 in (1,067 mm) and renamed the Dublin and Lucan Electric Railway Company (D&LER).

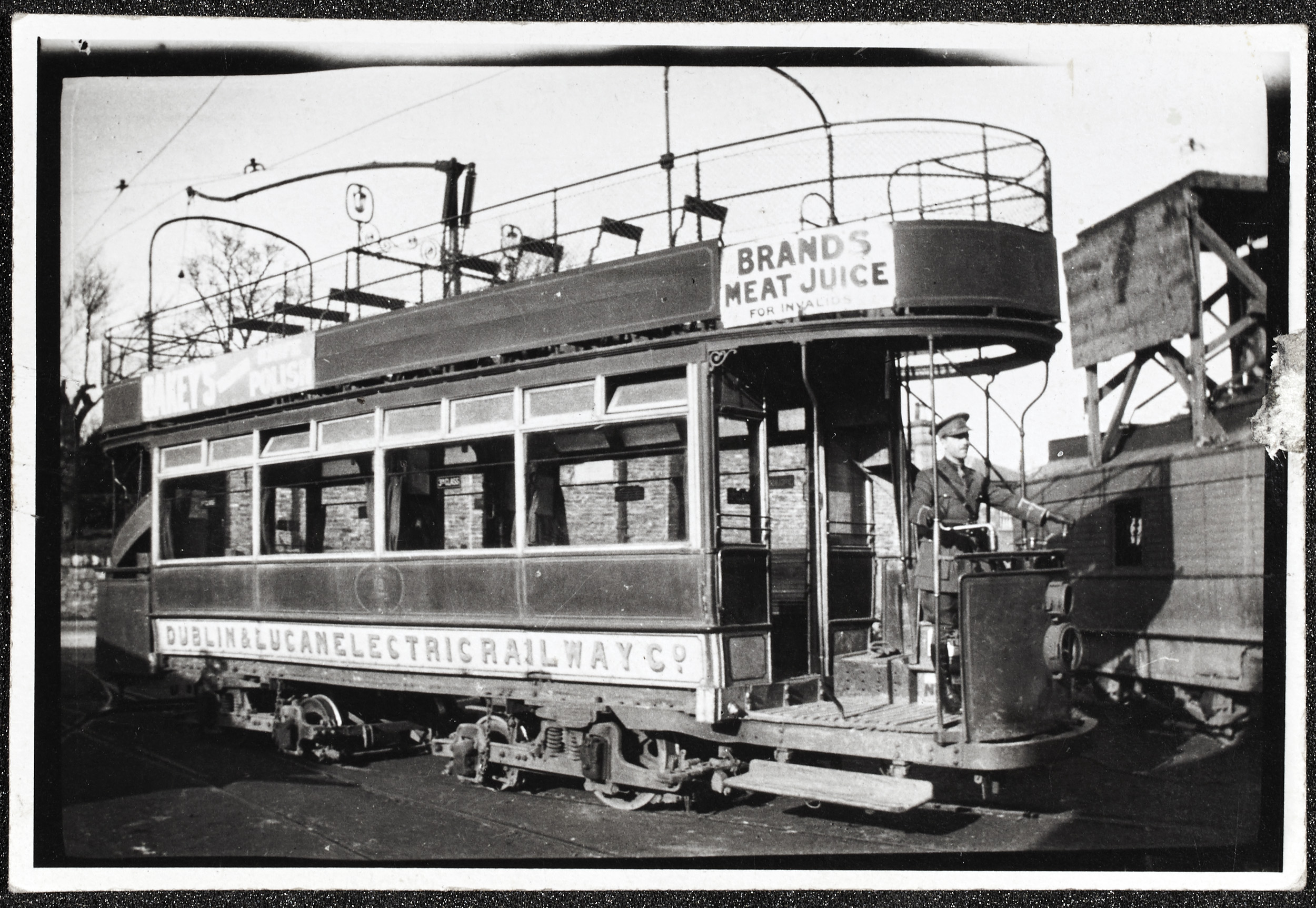
Dublin and Lucan Electric Railway tram

Legally a railway, it was taken over and supported by the government during World War I under the Defence of the Realm Act 1914 (DORA). However, this ended in 1921 and facing increasing competition from the Tower Bus Co., the D&LER's financial position deteriorated.

In 1925, after their failure to be amalgamated into the GSR under the Railways Act 1924, the line was closed, going into liquidation. Following discussions, and enabled by two acts of the Irish Free State, the D&LER was bought up by the DUTC. The lines were regauged to Dublin's 5 ft 3 in (1,600 mm) only as far as Lucan, a new line was fitted in Chapelizod, and it reopened as a DUTC route in 1928.

===== Extensions beyond Lucan =====
Lucan and Leixlip Steam Tramway

The Lucan, Leixlip and Celbridge Steam Tramway Company was established to build lines from the Lucan terminus to Leixlip and Celbridge (branching off just outside Leixlip). The Lucan and Leixlip Steam Tramway (L&LST) extension was built, and operated between 1890 and 1898. After it went into liquidation, its assets were sold at auction on 1 August 1899, including around 6,160 yards (5,630 m) of rails, two bogie passenger carriages, two other passenger carriages, two goods wagons, a locomotive engine, a water ram in the River Liffey and much other material

Lucan and Leixlip Electric Railway

A new line was laid close to the original steam line, over a decade later, under an Order in Council, the Lucan and Leixlip Electric Railway Order 1910 (SR&O 1910/1316), by a completely new company. Despite the name, this does not seem to have followed the full distance to Leixlip but rather only the 0.5 miles (0.80 km) to the Spa Hotel at Doddsborough. This was opened as an electric line in 1910, and was leased to the (D&LER) in August 1911.

When the DUTC bought up the insolvent D&LER, they also purchased the L&LER from its shareholders, and although required to refit and reopen it in like manner, following objections from Dublin County Council the extension beyond Lucan was not reopened.

===== Interconnection of the Lucan / Leixlip and city trams =====
The Lucan tram & terminus (left) & DUTC tram & terminus (right), Phoenix Park Gate

While not originally connected, the Dublin terminus of the Lucan line was 12 yards from the Park Gate terminus of the DUTC lines, on Conyngham Road, and the two were connected after the purchase by the DUTC.

==== Hill of Howth Tramway ====
Operated by the Great Northern Railway (GNR), the Hill of Howth Tramway comprised a single route, from Sutton railway station to Howth railway station over Howth Head by way of the Summit. The tramway was opened under the Great Northern Railway (Ireland) Act 1897 (60 & 61 Vict. c. ccviii) (and the Tramways Acts), the first line segment, from Sutton to the Summit, on 17 July 1901, the remainder to Howth on 1 August 1901.

=== Industrial services ===
==== Guinness Brewery tramways ====
Saint James's Gate Brewery (Dublin) Tramways Act 1878
- Act of Parliament
- Parliament of the United Kingdom
- Long title: An Act to authorise Edward Cecil Guinness to construct certain Tramways in the City of Dublin; and for other purposes.
- Citation: 41 & 42 Vict. c. xxix
- Territorial extent: United Kingdom

Dates
- Royal assent: 16 April 1878
- Commencement: 16 April 1878
Other legislation
Relates to	Dublin St. James's Gate Brewery Tramways Act 1901

Text of statute as originally enacted

Dublin St. James's Gate Brewery Tramways Act 1901
- Act of Parliament
- Parliament of the United Kingdom
- Long title: An Act to authorise Arthur Guinness Son and Company (Limited) to construct tramways in the city of Dublin in connexion with St. James’s Gate Brewery and to work the same and their existing tramways by mechanical or other power to construct certain street improvements and for other purposes.
- Citation: 1 Edw. 7. c. lxviii
- Territorial extent: United Kingdom

Dates
- Royal assent: 2 July 1901
- Commencement: 2 July 1901

Guinness Brewery Locos nos. 2 & 3, "Hops" & "Malt", built 1876

The Guinness Brewery tramways was a system of industrial tramways that operated on and around the site of St. James's Gate Brewery. Two different gauges were used; a narrow gauge tramway and a broad gauge line. Neither were for public use.

===== The narrow gauge tramway =====
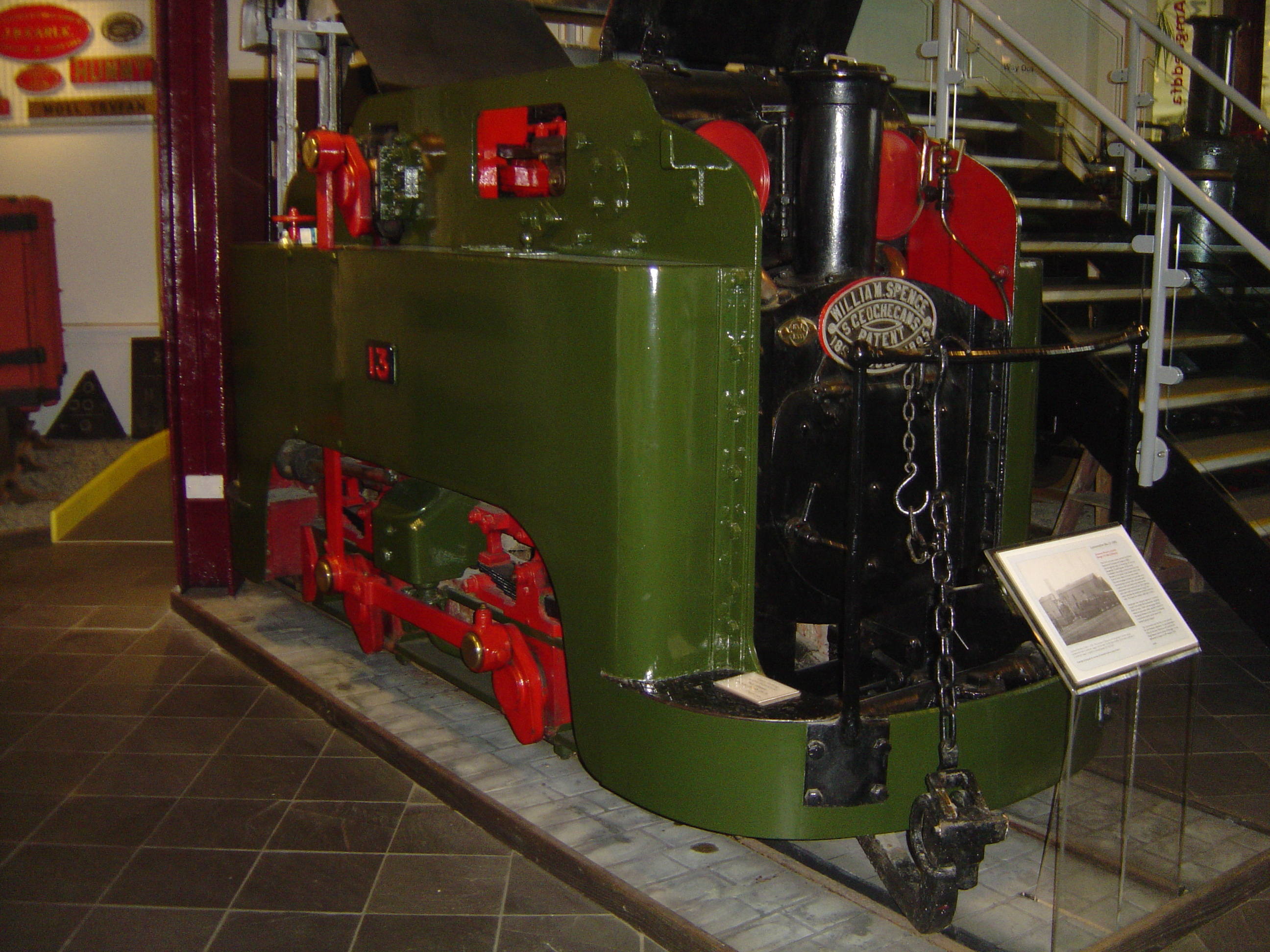
No. 13, Talyllyn Museum

The narrow gauge tramway operated on and around the site of St. James's Gate Brewery. The system was laid between 1873 and 1879 and had a gauge of 1 ft 10 in (559 mm). The tramway had direct access to the Liffey via a specially constructed quay and made use of a spiral tunnel to overcome a height difference on the brewery site. The tunnel cost £3,000 and construction spanned 1877–1878.

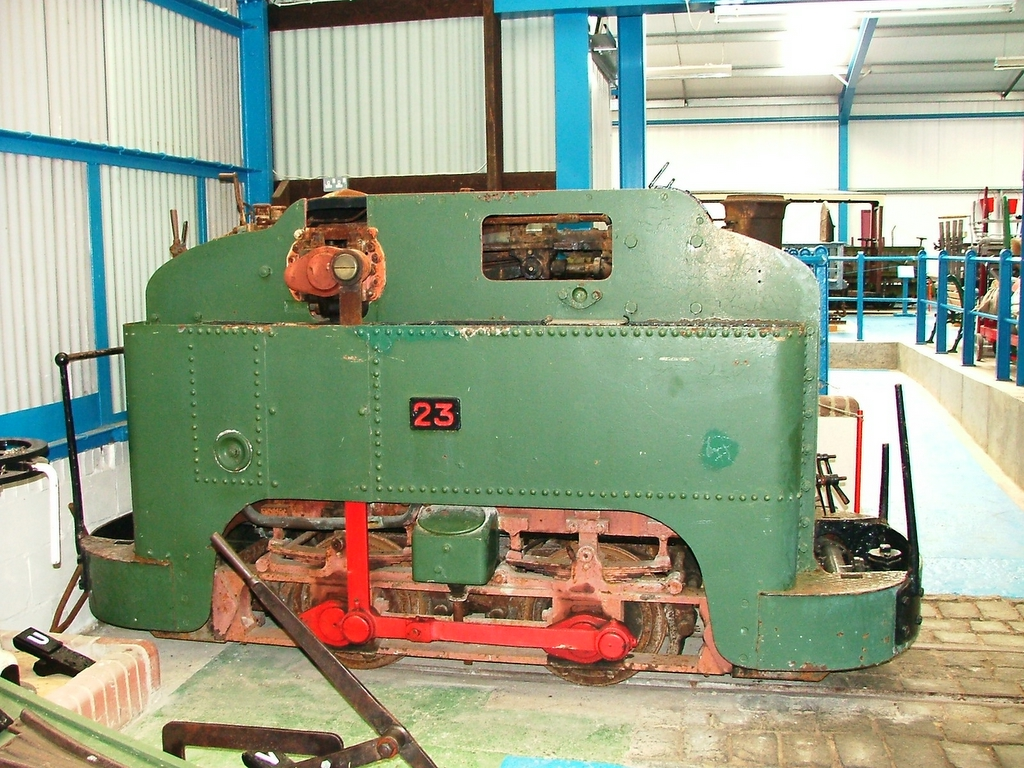
A Guinness narrow gauge loco, No. 23, one of the last built by W. Spence of the Cork Street Foundry and Engineering Works, Dublin in 1921

===== The broad gauge tramway =====
The broad gauge tramway connected the brewery with the goods yards of Heuston Station. The system began circa 1880, had a gauge of 5 ft 3 in (1,600 mm) and was horse drawn but they were replaced by the narrow gauge tramway's locomotives on a special haulage wagon. The broad gauge system closed on 15 May 1965.

== In literature ==
Dublin tramways, routes, tracks and the DUTC are mentioned several times in Ulysses by James Joyce

== Today ==
Around the city it is still possible to see buildings associated with the system such as the Dartry Depot, Clonskeagh Depot, Donnybrook Depot (now part of Donnybrook Bus Garage), Dalkey Yard (some track still in-situ), the Sandymount Depot, the Marlborough Street Depot which still features the lettering DUTC and elements in Clontarf, as well as the Power House in Ringsend, and other reminders of the system also exist. Meanwhile some trams are preserved in the National Museum of Ireland and the National Transport Museum of Ireland (at Howth Castle) and at the National Tramway Museum in the UK. A modern tram system, Luas, opened in 2004.

== Gallery ==
=== Historic ===
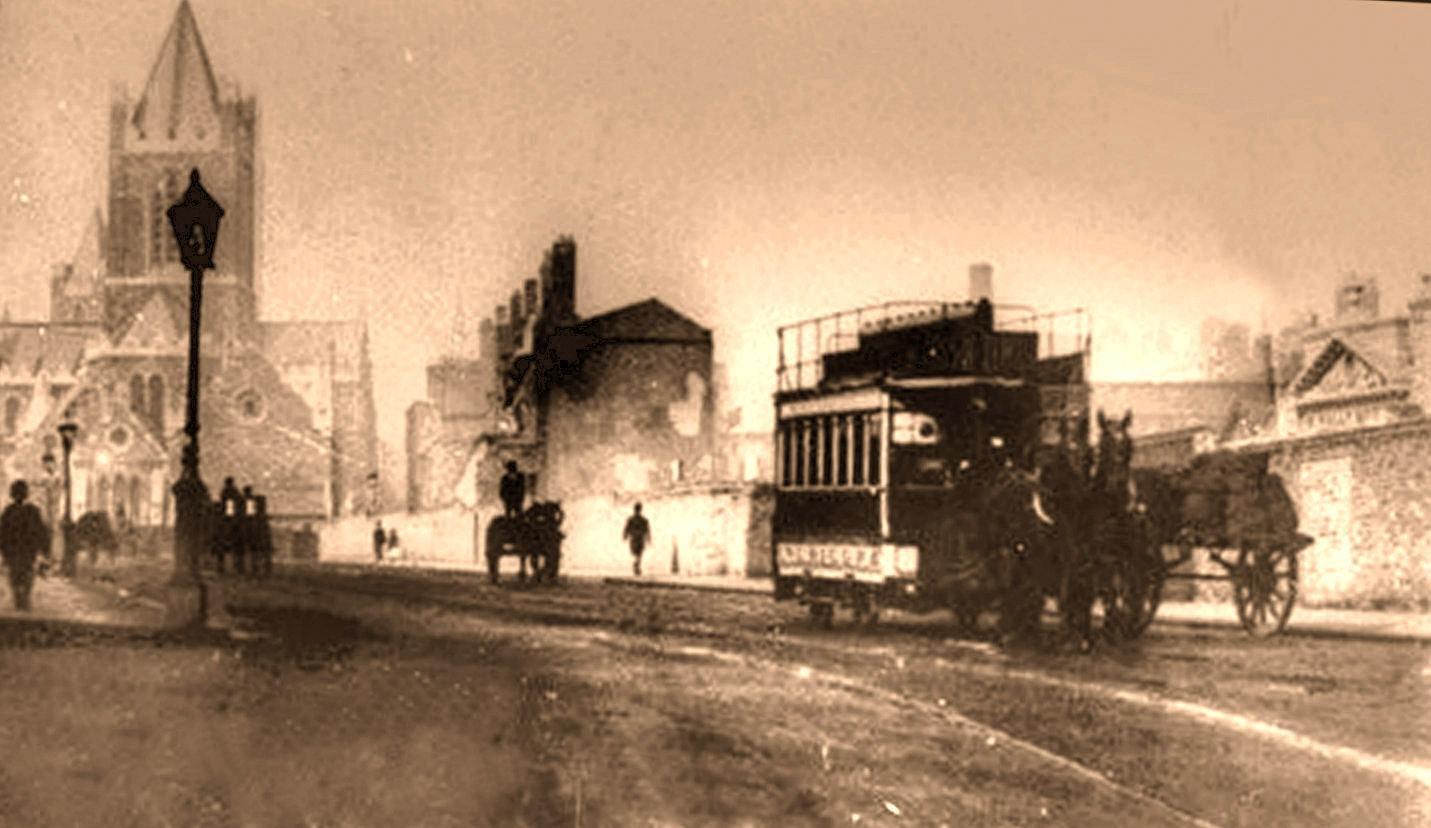
Horse tram, Lord Edward St.

Horse trams on Sackville Street (modern-day O'Connell St), 1896

Electric trams, Dame Street, 1910

Former horse tram, No. 80, converted to electric, Sackville St., ca. 1900

The Leixlip extension, 1892

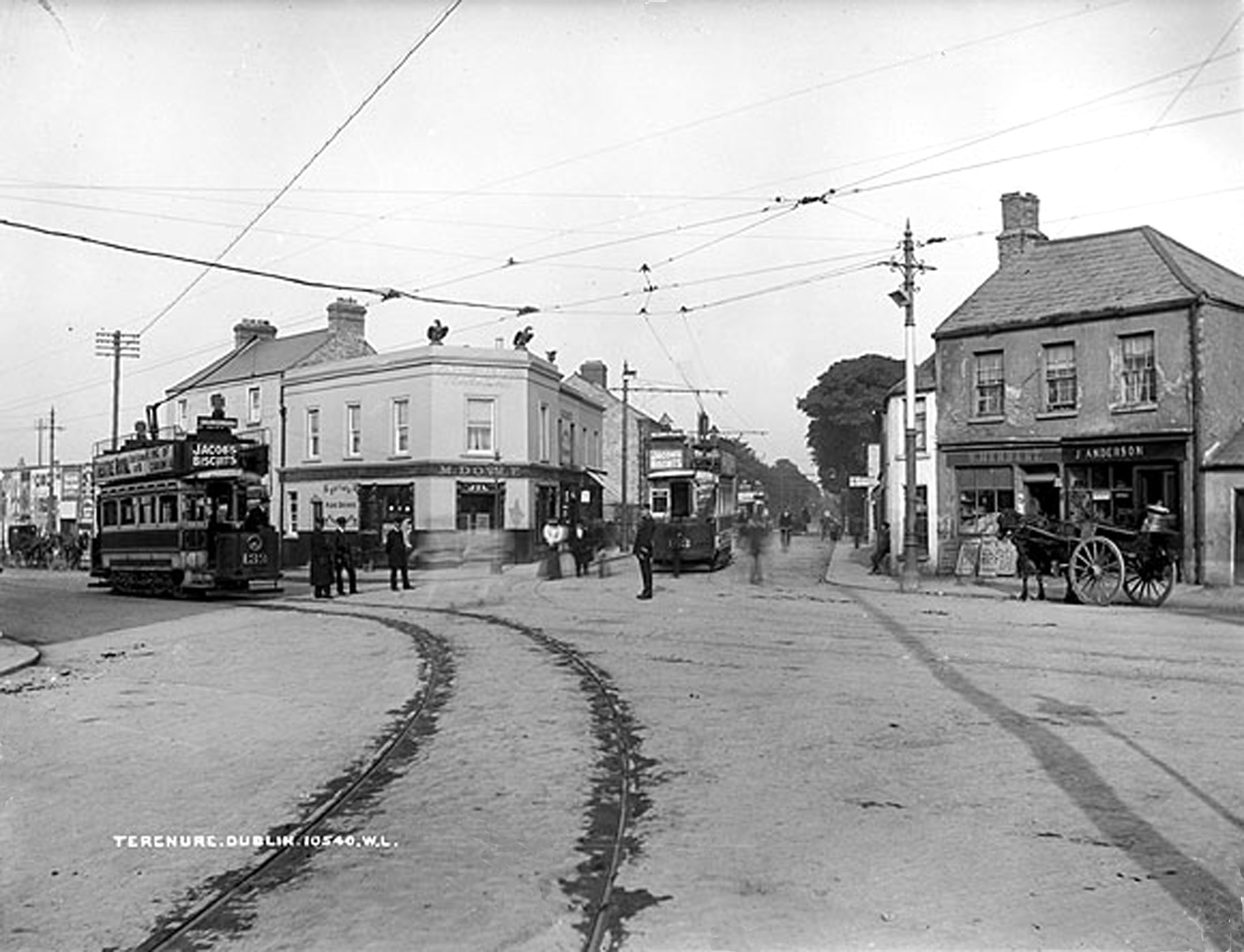
The route 16 tram (left) & the route 15 tram (centre) at Terenure Cross, c. 1900. The line in the foreground connected with the D&BST's Terenure depot. It was used at night to transfer goods between the two systems.

Hill of Howth Tramway trams at Howth railway station

The Hill of Howth Tramway, 1907

The D&LER terminus, Lucan, 1907

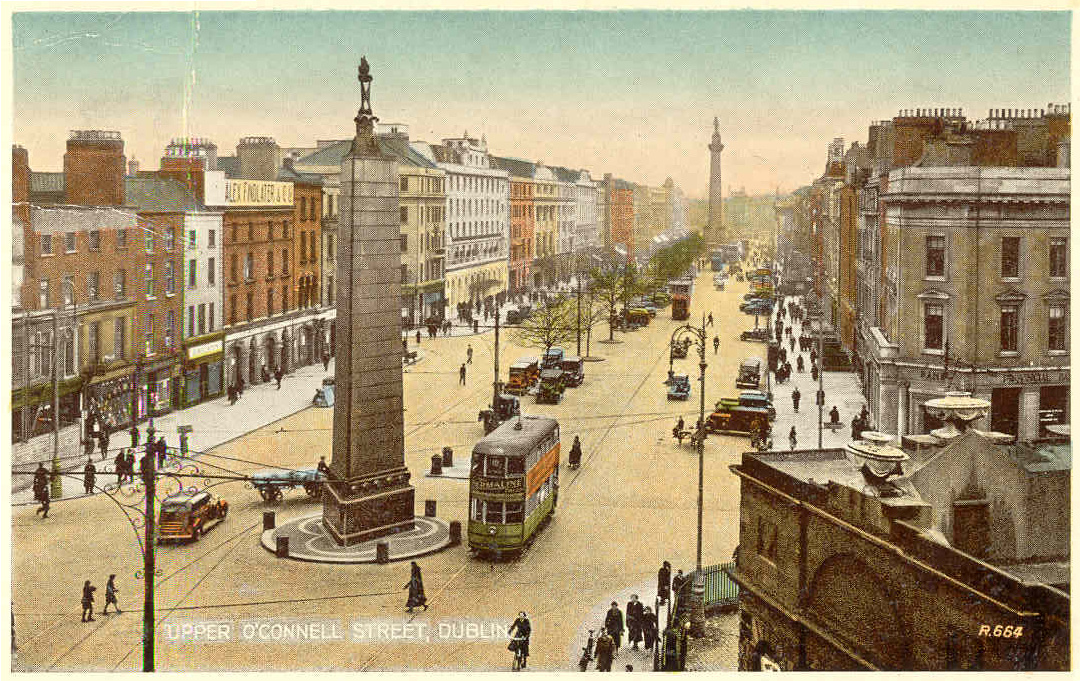
Electric trams in Sackville Street in the early 20th century.

=== Modern day ===
The former DUTC Power House, Ringsend

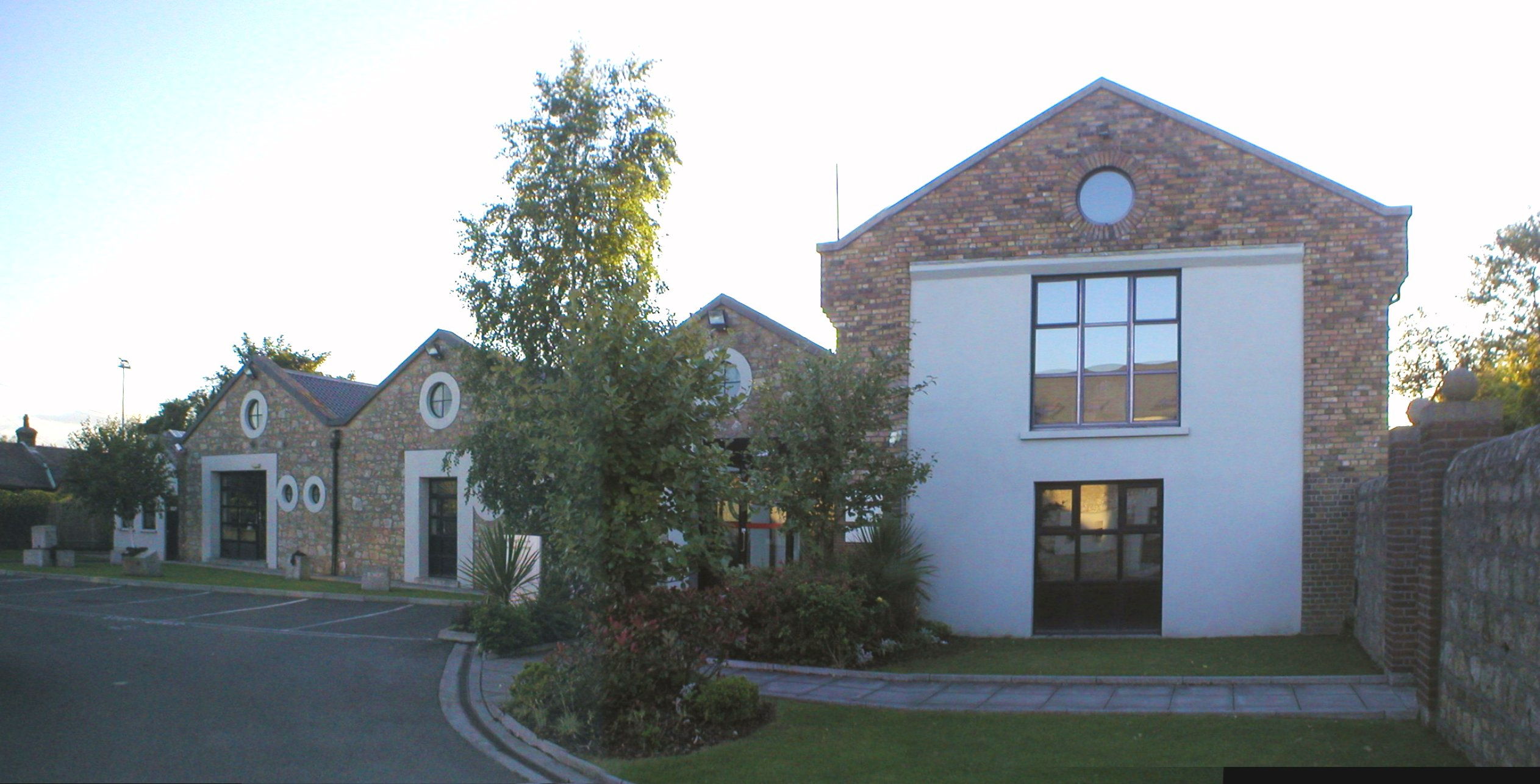
The original 1872 Sandymount horse tram sheds, for the single-decker trams of the No. 4 route

The later Sandymount electric tram shed

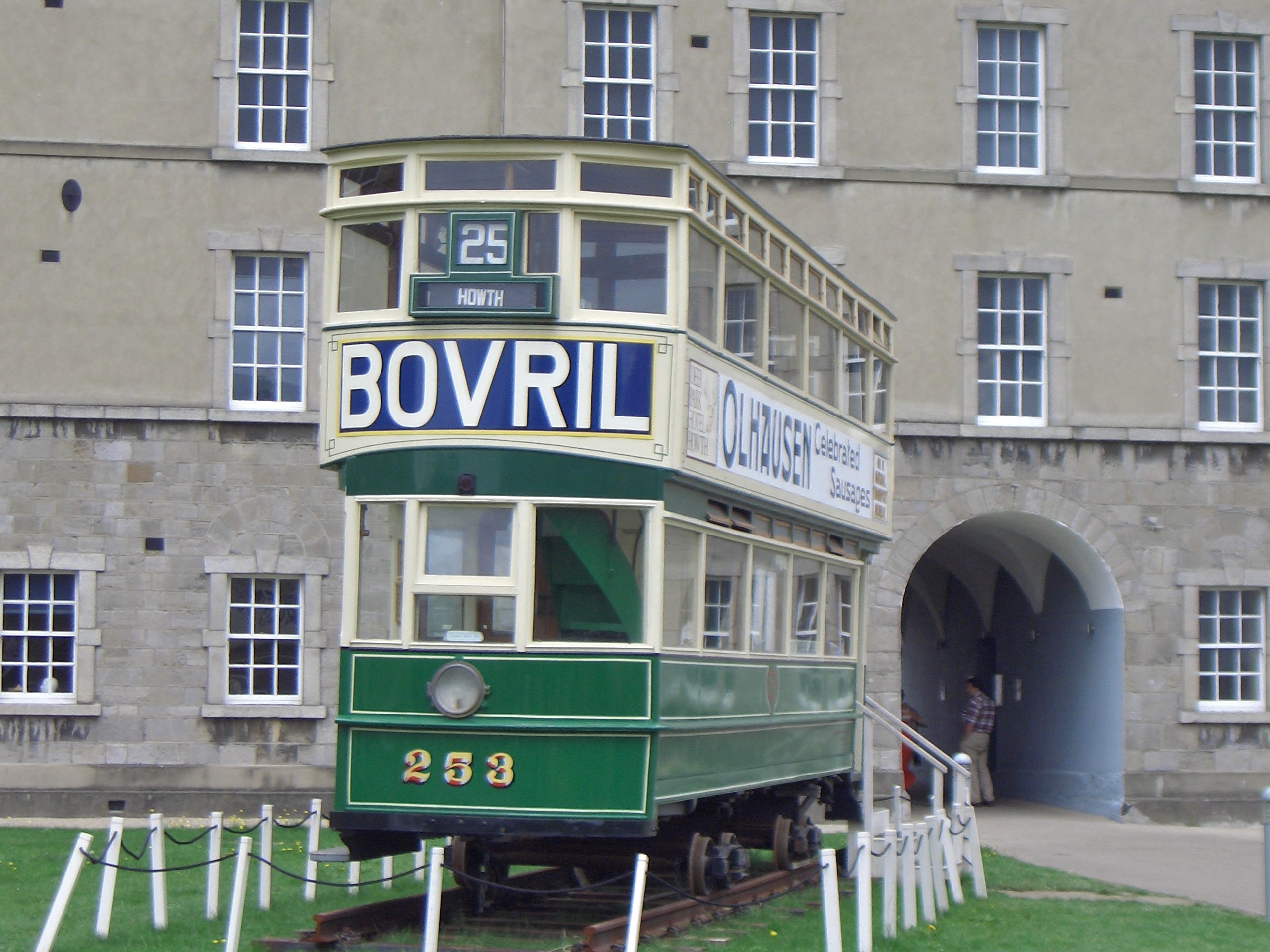
Restored No. 253 on temporary bogies

== See also ==
- Dublin United Transport Company
- Hill of Howth Tramway
- Dublin and Blessington Steam Tramway
