= Trams in Dublin =

Trams in Dublin may refer to:

- Dublin tramways (a system of trams that operated in Dublin between 1872 and 1949)
- Luas (a system of trams that has operated in Dublin since 2004)
