= Hill of Howth Tramway =

Tram which served Howth Head, Ireland

Trams at Howth railway station

The Howth Tram on the Hill of Howth Tramway was a tram which served Howth Head, near Dublin, Ireland. The termini were at Sutton railway station, by the entrance to the peninsula, and Howth railway station by the village and harbour of Howth.

== Design ==
The line of the route was designed in-house by the Great Northern Rail staff at their Dublin office, under William Hemingway Mills, chief engineer. The engineer responsible for the detailed design was Joshua Harrison Hargrave, the famous Cork-born photographer/engineer.

== History ==
The service operated from June 1901 to 31 May 1959 and was run by the Great Northern Railway (Ireland) (GNR(I)), which viewed it as a way to bring more customers to its railway stations at Sutton and Howth. The tramway replaced a horse-drawn omnibus service, which had run since 1867.

=== Closure and replacement ===
The Hill of Howth Tramway, 1907

On 1 October 1958, Córas Iompair Éireann (CIÉ) took over GNR(I)'s operations in the Republic of Ireland, including the Howth Tram. A year later, the tramway was closed down. It was initially replaced by two CIÉ bus routes – numbers 87 (Sutton to Ceanchor Road) and 88 (Howth to Windgate Road). Two routes were necessary, as several narrow hill curves were not passable by the buses used. Eventually, sections of the disused tram route between the Baily post office and the Summit were expanded to form an extension of Carrickbrack Road; this enabled a single bus route (number 88) to be used.

The area was then served by the 31, 31a and 31b bus routes, which operated from Abbey Street in the city centre. In winter, icy roads on the hill occasionally cause the bus service to be suspended, unlike the tram, which ran in all weather conditions. A public footpath now follows the tram route between Howth station and the Summit.

== Preservation ==
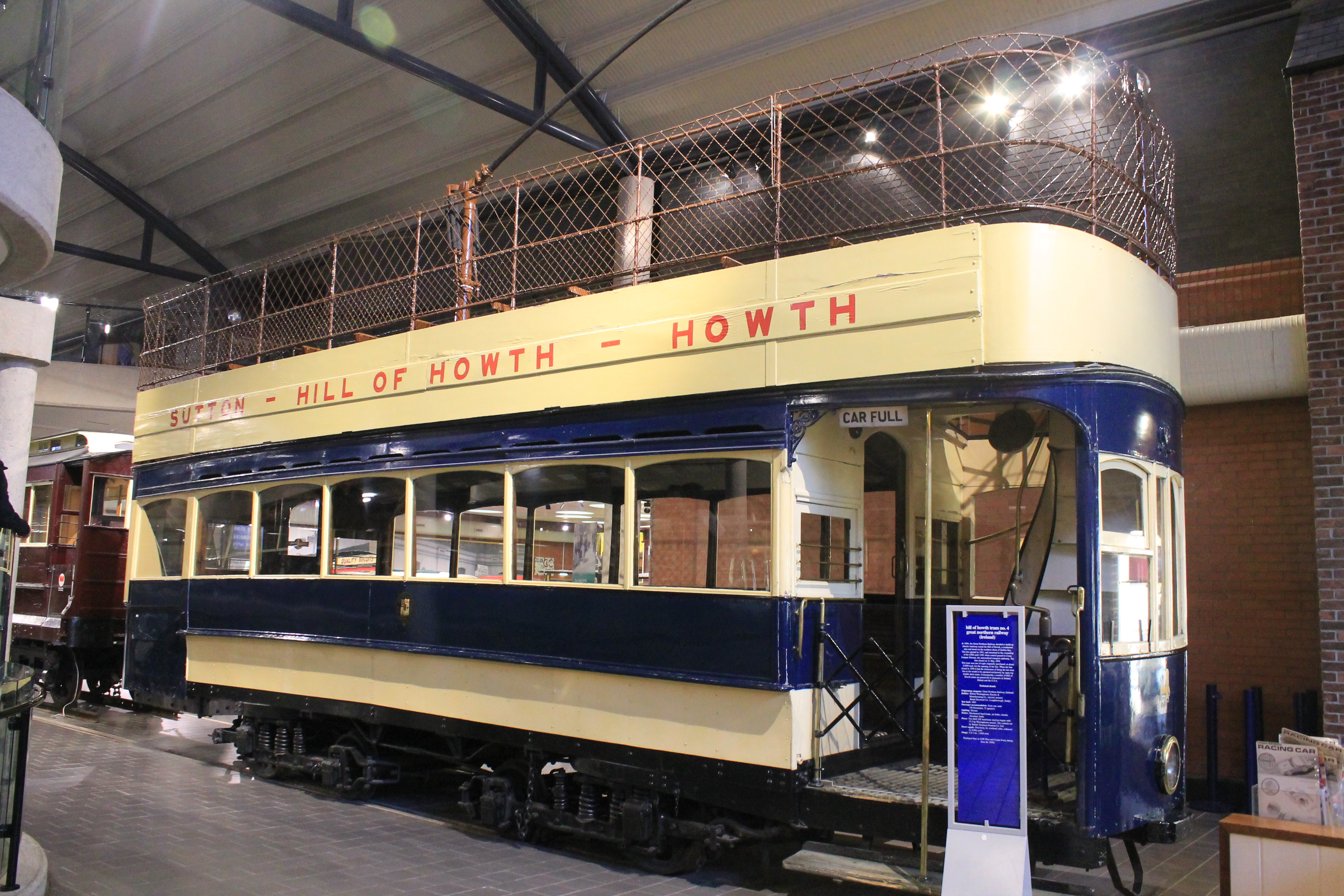
No. 4 at Cultra

Four of the trams survive in preservation. No. 9 is now exhibited at the National Transport Museum of Ireland, which is located at Howth Castle, near the former terminus of the tramway at Howth railway station. No. 4 is on display the Ulster Folk and Transport Museum at Cultra. No. 10 is preserved at the National Tramway Museum in Derbyshire, England; it has been converted to 4' 8.5" gauge and had previously run on the Blackpool Tramway from 1985-89. No. 2 is at the Southern California Railway Museum, California, USA, in operating condition; it has also been converted to 4' 8.5" gauge.

== Possible plans to reinstate the tramway ==
In 2016 Fingal County Council announced that it was issuing an invitation to tender for options for potential reinstatement of the Howth Tramway or part of it, as a possible tourist attraction. Proposals which have been considered included the option of a horse-drawn tram on tracks along the seafront.

== Route ==
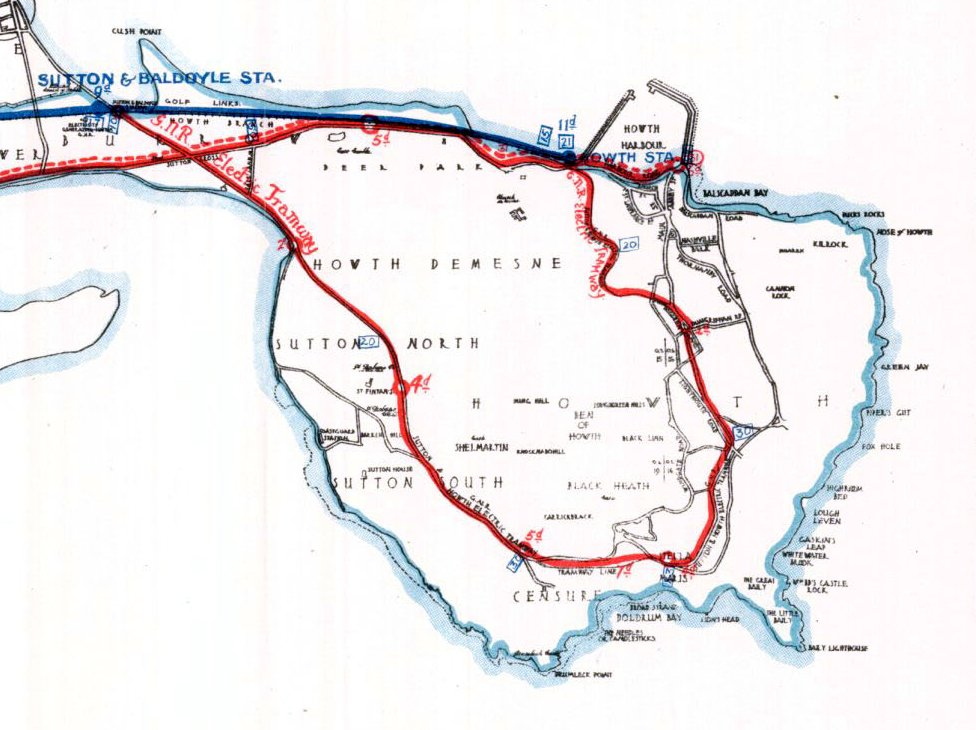
Route map, c. 1922

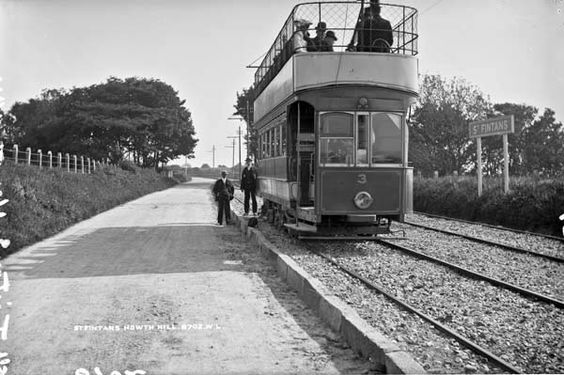
St Fintans stop on the Hill of Howth tram.

Electric double-decker tramcars ran the five-mile route, which went from Sutton station along Greenfield Road and Carrickbrack Road to St. Fintan's Cemetery, then past the Baily post office and Stella Maris convent to Howth Summit. From there, the tramway ran down into Howth, terminating at the railway station. Most of the route was single track, with passing points at the main stopping places. The track gauge was 1,600 mm (5 ft 3 in), the same standard as railways in Ireland.

=== Stops ===
Stop	Year opened	Year closed	Note
Sutton Station	1901	1959	Sutton tramcar shed (connected to mainline in 1951)
Sutton Cross	1901	1959	
Marine Hotel	1901	1959	Request stop
Church Road	1901	1959	Request stop. Formerly called Saxe (or Sax or Sacks) Lane
Strand Road	1901	1959	
Howth Desmesne	1901	1959	
St Fintans' Cemetery	1901	1959	Request stop
St Fintans	1901	1959	
St Fintans' Road	1901	1959	Request stop
Barren Hill	1901	1959	
Red Rock	1901	1959	Request stop
Somali Village	1901	1959	Request stop (also called Bellinghams')
Ceanchor Road	1901	1959	Request stop
Baily Post Office	1901	1959	
Convent Gate	1901	1959	Request stop
Stella Maris	1901	1959	Formerly called Bay View or Baily View
Ravensdale	1901	1959	Request stop
Tweedys' Lane	1901	1959	Request stop
Hill of Howth	1901	1959	Formerly called Howth Summit, renamed 1912
Kitestown Road	1901	1959	Request stop (formerly called Bakers' Lane)
Greys' Lane	1901	1959	Request stop
Dungriffen Road	1901	1959	
Balkill Road	1901	1959	Request stop (also called Balglass)
Island View	1901	1959	Request stop
'Korea'	circa 1950s	1959	Unofficial stopping place
Howth Station	1901	1959	Connection to mainline

== See also ==
- Dublin United Transport Company - The largest tramway operator in Dublin (pre-1945)
- Clontarf and Hill of Howth Tramroad
- Dublin and Blessington Steam Tramway
- Dublin tram system
