= National Transport Museum of Ireland =

Transport museum in Howth near Dublin, Ireland

- Iarsmalann Náisiunta Iompair na hÉireann
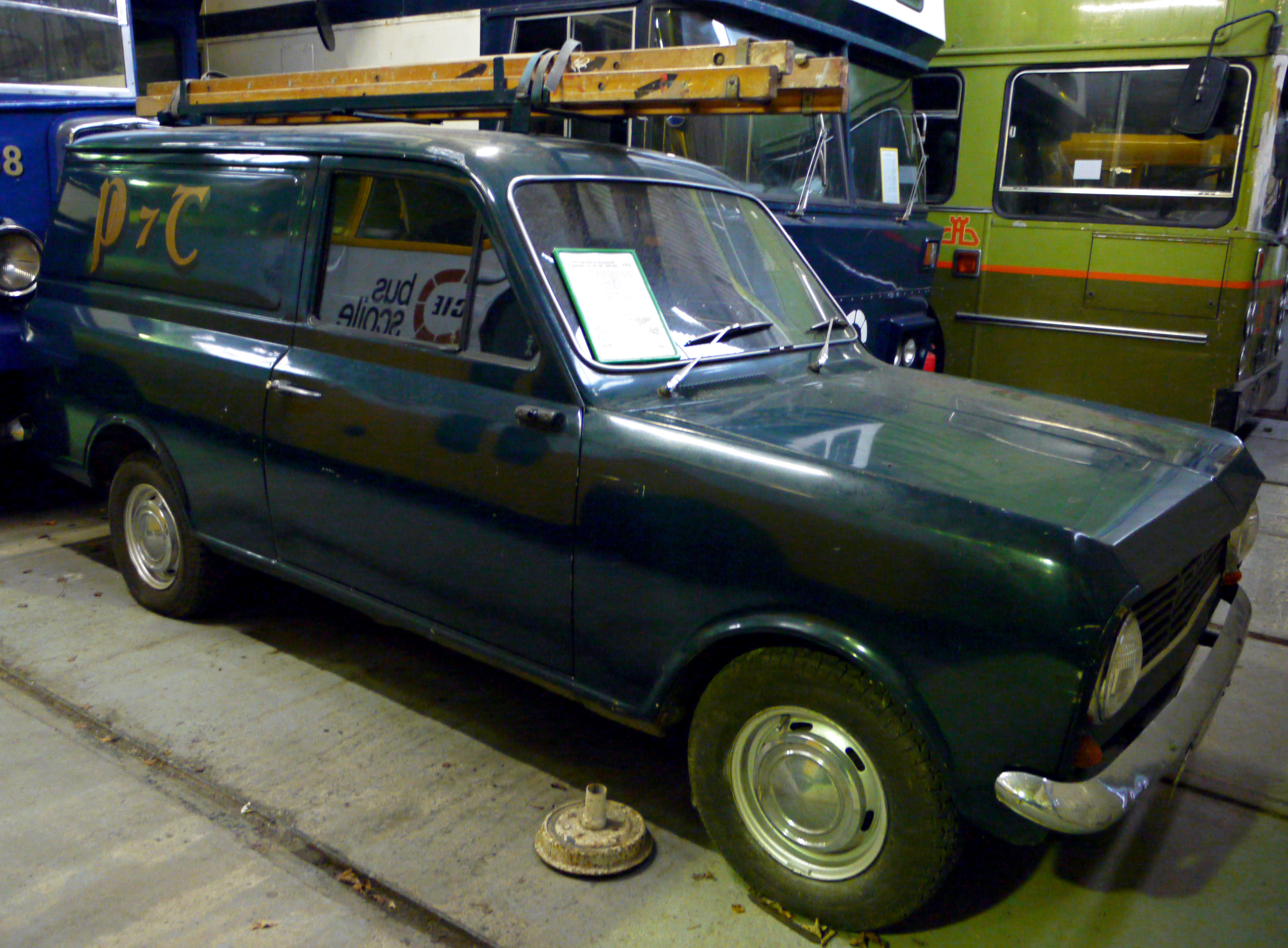
- 1969 Posts & Telegraphs Bedford HA Van

- Location within Dublin
- Established: 1949
- Location: Heritage Depot, Howth Demesne, Ireland
- Coordinates: 53.386807°N 6.081035°W
- Type: Transport museum
- Collection size: >180 vehicles
- Owner: Transport Museum Society of Ireland
- Public transit access: Howth railway station Dublin Bus
- Parking: Parking available at museum
- Website: nationaltransportmuseum.ie

The National Transport Museum of Ireland (Irish: Iarsmalann Náisiunta Iompair na hÉireann), the main project of the Transport Museum Society of Ireland, is based in the grounds of Howth Castle in Ireland. It is the current form of a project begun in the 1940s and restructured in the early 1970s. It operated the Castleruddery Transport Museum from 1974 to 1985, opening in Howth in 1986. It has a collection of more than 180 vehicles in all.

== Location and access ==
The museum is located in the Heritage Depot, Howth Demesne, Howth, Ireland, in former farm buildings, which are accessed via the main gates for Howth Castle. The museum is run on a voluntary basis, and is funded by an entry fee, sales of posters, and donations.

== Collection ==
Sixty vehicles are currently in Howth on display, out of over 180 held. The oldest items date from the second half of the 19th century, the newest in 1984. The collection features buses, lorries, trucks, fire engines, trams and tractors, and also exhibited is the restored Hill of Howth No.9 Tram. At one point in the early 2000s, the collection was increasing at an annual average rate of five, and had already reached a total of 170 vehicles (with an average age of 46 years). Sixty out of the 100 vehicles currently in Howth are on display, and others can be inspected by prior arrangement, while the remaining vehicles are held at a reserve depot at Castleruddery / Donoughmore, between Donard, Stratford-on-Slaney and the Glen of Imaal in County Wicklow.
