= Bayside railway station =

Railway station in Fingal, Ireland

Bayside Cois Bá
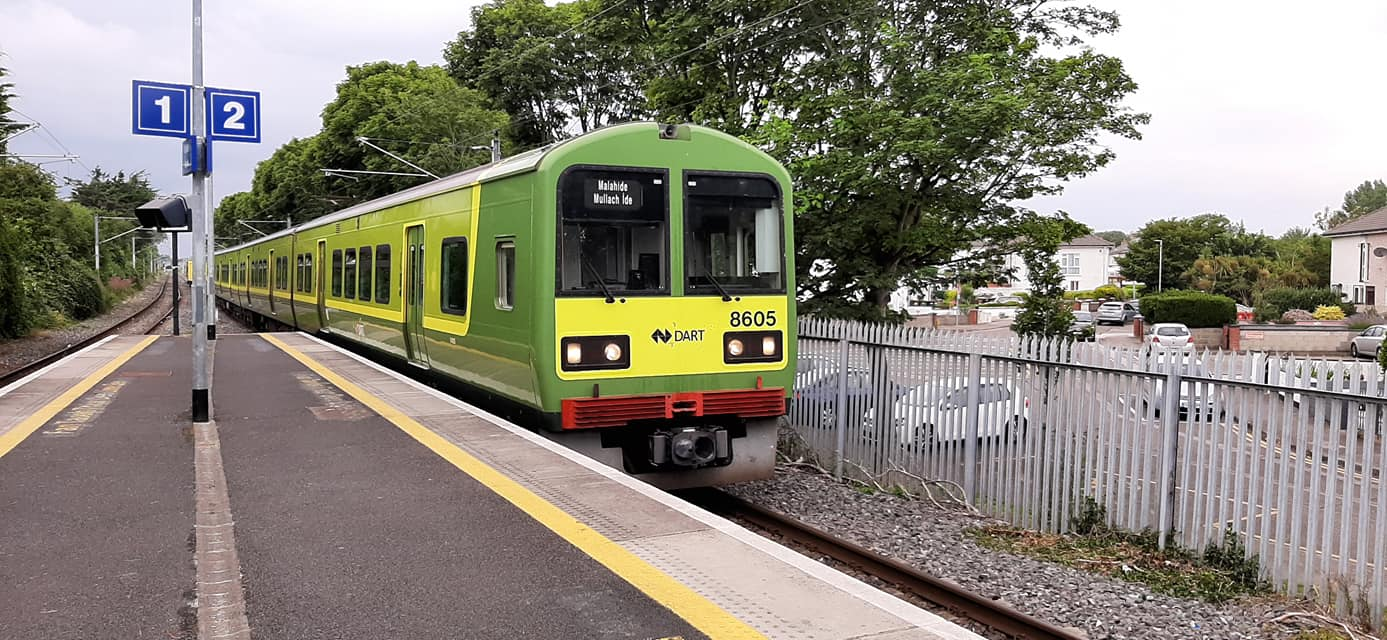
- DART train arriving at Platform 2

General information
- Location: Sutton, Dublin; Ireland
- Coordinates: 53°23′29″N 6°08′13″W
- Owner: Iarnród Éireann
- Transit authority: TFI
- Line: Howth branch line
- Platforms: singular island with 2 platforms
- Tracks: 2

Construction
- Structure type: At-grade
- Parking: 9 free 24hr spaces
- Cycle facilities: 10 bike spaces

Other information
- Station code: BYSDE
- Fare zone: Suburban 2

History
- Opened: 11 June 1973

Key dates
- 24 July 1984: Station upgraded

Services
Preceding station	Iarnród Éireann	Following station
Howth Junction towards Greystones	DART (Howth Branch)	Sutton towards Howth
Route map
Location

Bayside DART station is a railway station in Fingal, Ireland that serves the district of Bayside and Baldoyle. It is a 5 minute walk from Bayside. It has an island platform accessible by pedestrian subways. The ticket office is open between 05:45-00:30 AM, Monday to Sunday.

== History ==
The station opened on 11 June 1973.

== Services ==
=== Train Services ===
From Monday to Friday, trains run every 20-30 minutes in both directions. On Saturdays, trains run every 25-35 minutes, and on Sundays, every 30-40 minutes. Trains to Howth depart from Platform 2, while trains bound for the City Centre depart from Platform 1.

=== Bus Services ===
As of July 2024 no bus routes serve the station.

== See also ==
- List of railway stations in Ireland
- Dublin Area Rapid Transit
- Bayside
- Iarnród Éireann
