= Dublin and Blessington Steam Tramway =

Former steam tram in County Wicklow, Ireland

- Dublin and Blessington Steam Tramway; Blessington and Poulaphouca Steam Tramway (worked by DBST)

Overview
- Dates of operation: 1 August 1888–31 December 1932

Technical
- Track gauge: 5 ft 3 in (1,600 mm)
- Length: 20 1/4 miles (32.6 km)

The Dublin and Blessington Steam Tramway (DBST), operated steam-powered trams between Terenure in Dublin and Blessington in County Wicklow, Ireland from 1888 until 1932. An extension, named the Blessington and Poulaphouca Steam Tramway, opened in 1895.

== History ==
The tramway was approved by the Dublin and Blessington Steam Tramway Order 1887.

On Wednesday, 1 August 1888, the Dublin and Blessington Steam Tramway (the DBST) opened for business. The first train was the 8:35 a.m. mail train leaving Terenure for Blessington. The tramway used the Irish standard gauge of 5 ft 3 in (1,600 mm). The tramway connected with the horse-drawn trams from the city.

An extension of the line to Poulaphouca was opened in 1895, and the Blessington and Poulaphouca Steam Tramway was incorporated, with through-running from Terenure from 1896 until the extension was closed in 1927.

In an instalment of the Thorough Guides travel book series in 1895, Charles Slegg Ward noted that passengers could opt to pay more in order to journey from Blessington to Poulaphouca and onwards to Harristown station where they could connect in with the Sallins to Tullow railway line. This Sallins-Tullow line operated a passenger service from 1885 to 1947.

In September 1898, extra tram services were put on for passengers travelling to a brass band festival at Poulaphouca, at which a number of Irish bands participated including the Protestant Row Band, the Dublin Bricklayers Band, and the local Ballyknockan Brass Band.

In 1911, a major proposal was put forward for the electrification of the line as far as Crooksling, but the intervention of World War I meant that this was never put into effect.

In 1929, the Paragon Omnibus Company began operating a through bus service between Blessington and the city centre, eliminating the requirement for passengers to transfer between the DBST and the Dublin tram at Terenure. This struck a fatal blow to the DBST.

Last-ditch efforts were made in 1931 to have the DBST taken over by either the Dublin United Tramway Company, or by the Great Southern Railways. This did not come to pass, and so it was, that on 31 December 1932, a wet Saturday night, the last trains ran on the DBST lines, the 6:15 p.m. from Terenure to Blessington, and the 10:30 p.m. from Terenure to Tallaght. The tramway was abandoned by the Dublin and Blessington Steam Tramway (Abandonment) Act 1932 (No. 13).

Many people were killed on the tramway, including many who were intoxicated and run over by trams which was known to appear silently from around a turn in the road, or behind a hedge. In one case, a conductor was thrown to his death from the swaying trailer car. In Templeogue the bodies of the dead were taken to the Templeogue Inn, a local pub. This occurred so often the pub was nicknamed The Morgue.

== Sources ==
Fayle, H. & Newham, A. T., The Dublin & Blessington Steam Tramway, 1963.

== Sources ==
- Ward, Charles Slegg (1895). Thorough Guide Series. Ireland (Part II.) East, West and South including Dublin and Howth by C.S. Ward, M.A., Author of "North Devon and North Cornwall," Etc. London: Dulau & Co., 37, Soho Square, W.
