= Poulaphouca =

Location with waterfall, bridge and reservoir in County Wicklow, Ireland

Poulaphouca / Pollaphuca
- Poll an Phúca (Irish)
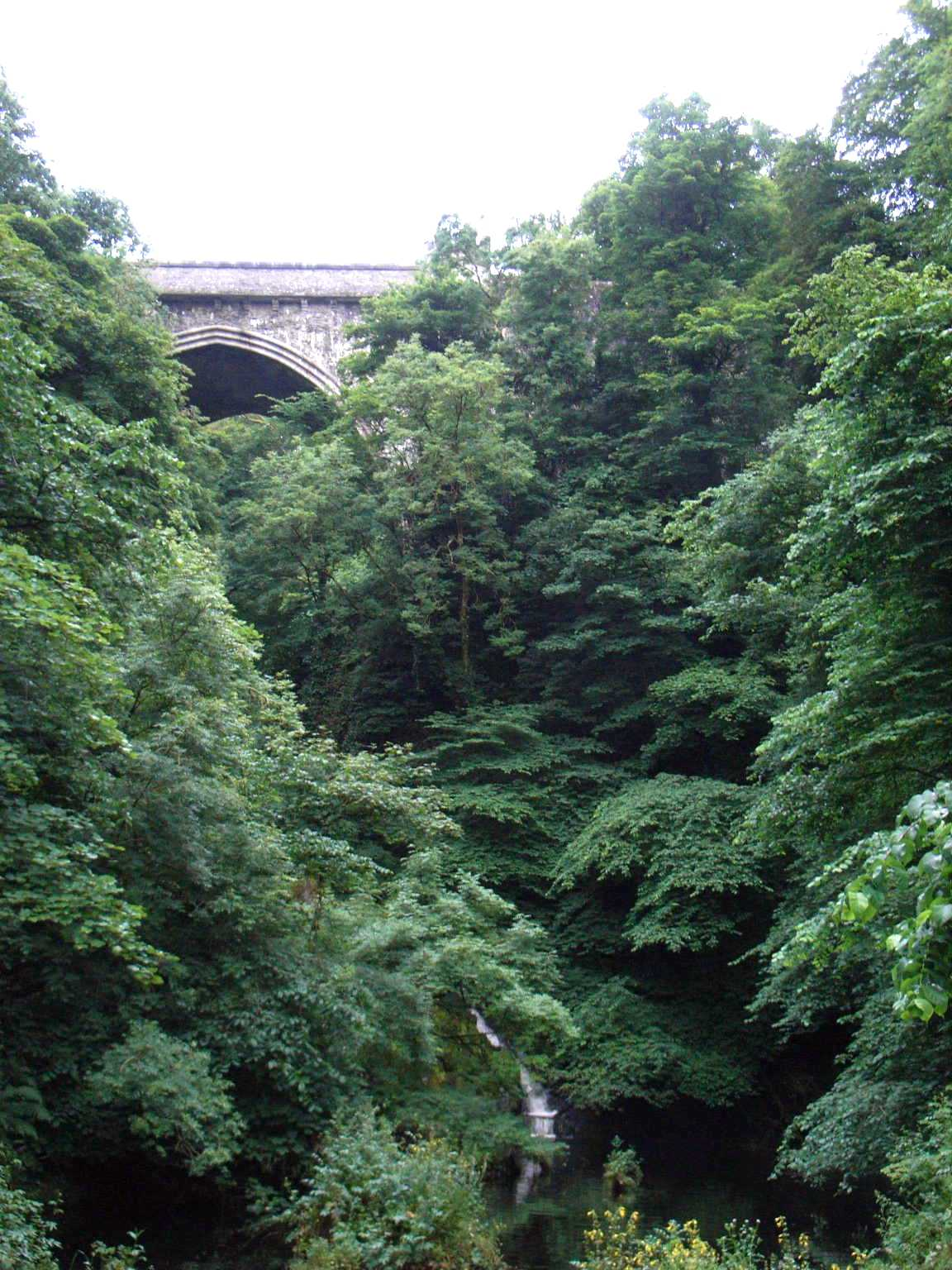
- Poulaphouca / Pollaphuca bridge

- Location in Ireland
- Location: County Wicklow
- Coordinates: 53°8′N 6°31′W
- Type: Reservoir
- Primary outflows: River Liffey
- Basin countries: Ireland

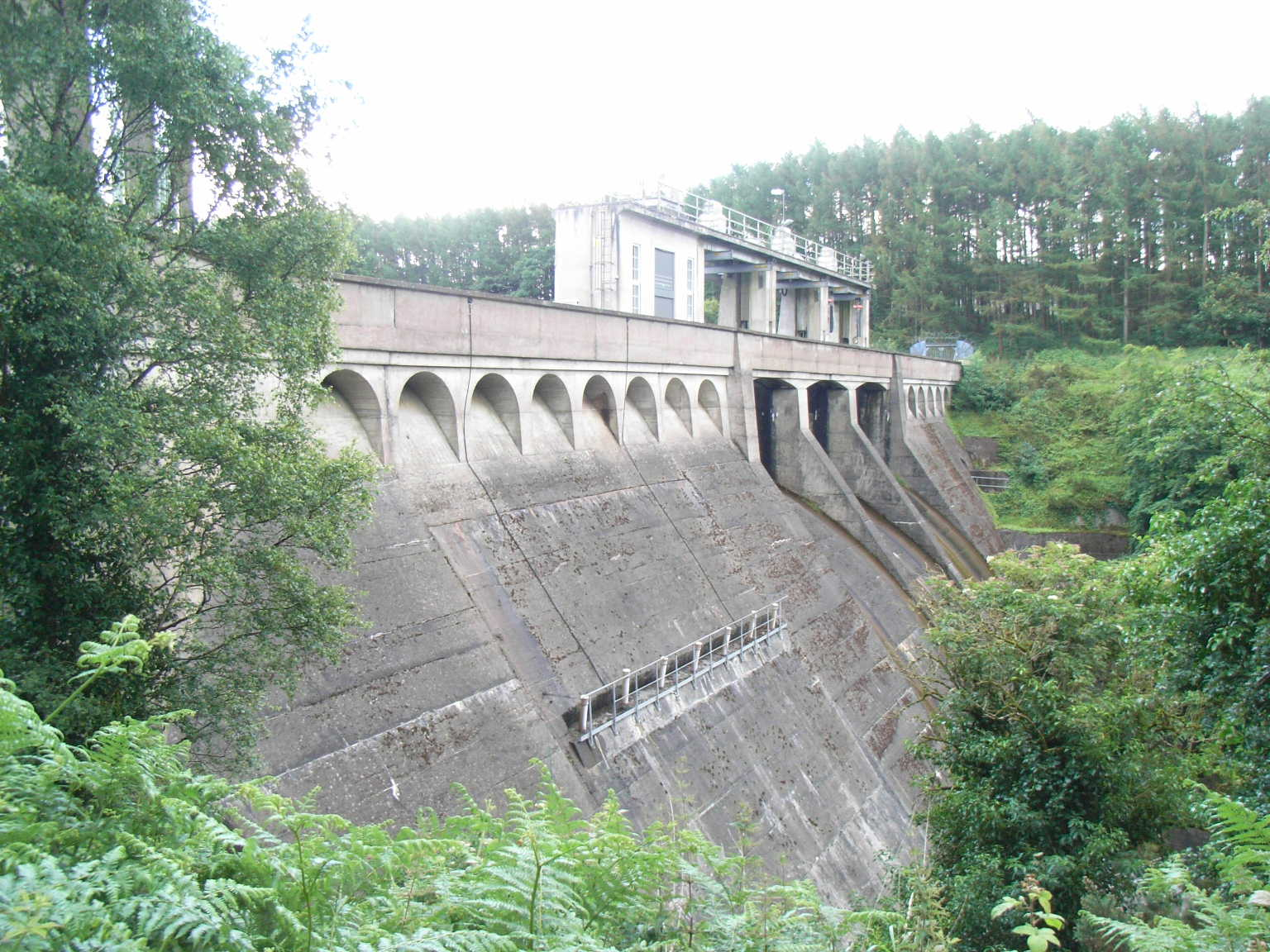
Pollaphuca dam

Poulaphouca, officially Pollaphuca (Irish: Poll an Phúca, meaning 'the Púca's hole'), is the name of a waterfall and bridge on the River Liffey between County Wicklow and County Kildare. It is primarily known for its hydroelectric generating station and the associated artificial lake, known as Poulaphouca Reservoir, Poulaphouca Lake, or Blessington Lakes. The once-famous Poulaphouca Waterfall has little water running over it any longer because of the hydroelectric project.

== Poulaphouca waterfall and bridge ==
A waterfall immediately west of the bridge, renowned as a beauty spot from at least the 18th century, was lost with the construction of the Poulaphouca Reservoir. The waterfall, marked as 'Poolapooka - a remarkable cataract' on Noble & Keenan's map of 1752, is depicted and described in the Post-Chaise Companion of 1786, when Ballymore parish was still within Dublin:

Poll-A-Phuca or the Daemon's Hole, being a grand waterfall formed from the head of the Liffey, that rises from the Wicklow Mountains, and here divides the counties of Wicklow and Dublin. It belongs to the Earl of Milltown; where his lordship has displayed great taste and judgement in forming and improving the several walks leading to this beautiful waterfall

Both Pollaphuca Bridge and a second bridge, crossing a dry gorge 150m to the southwest, were designed by Alexander Nimmo in Gothic style and built between 1822 and 1827 for a total cost of £4,704. Poulaphouca Bridge replaced Horsepass Bridge to the northeast, now under Poulaphouca Reservoir. Wright's Guide to the County of Wicklow describes the bridge and waterfall in 1827:

The celebrated fall of the River Liffey, called Pol-a-Phuca or the Daemon's Hole, is about one mile from the village of Ballymore Eustace. In rainy seasons, when the river is much swollen, the fall is calculated at 150 feet in height. This is to be understood as combining the altitudes of the three stages constituting the cascade. The chasm through which the water rushes is only forty feet wide, lined on each side with perpendicular masses of Greywacke rock. The centre fall is an extraordinary and terrific object. Here the whole body of water composing the stream of the Liffey, rushes down with the utmost impetuosity into a circular basin of stone, worn perfectly smooth, the form of which imparts to the water a rotatory motion...across this chasm a bridge has been thrown, to continue the new line of road to New Ross, the span of the arch is 65 feet, the altitude of the chord above the upper fall is 47, and the height of the keystone of the arch above the river's bed 150 feet; from the battlements there is a direct perpendicular view into the whirlpool just now described, and which gives name to the waterfall. This beautiful object and bold conception, the bridge of Pol-a-Phuca, is built from the design of Alexander Nimmo, Esq.

== Rail connection ==
A four-and-a-half-mile extension of the Dublin and Blessington Steam Tramway terminated at Poulaphouca. It was built by the Blessington and Poulaphouca Steam Tramway and opened on 1 May 1895. Service ended in 1932. The ticket office survives as a private residence immediately northeast of the bridge on the N81 road.

== References in media ==
- In James Joyce's novel Ulysses, Poulaphouca is the site of a childhood indiscretion (masturbation) by protagonist Leopold Bloom, who hallucinates the waterfall as a speaking character in the chapter "Circe".

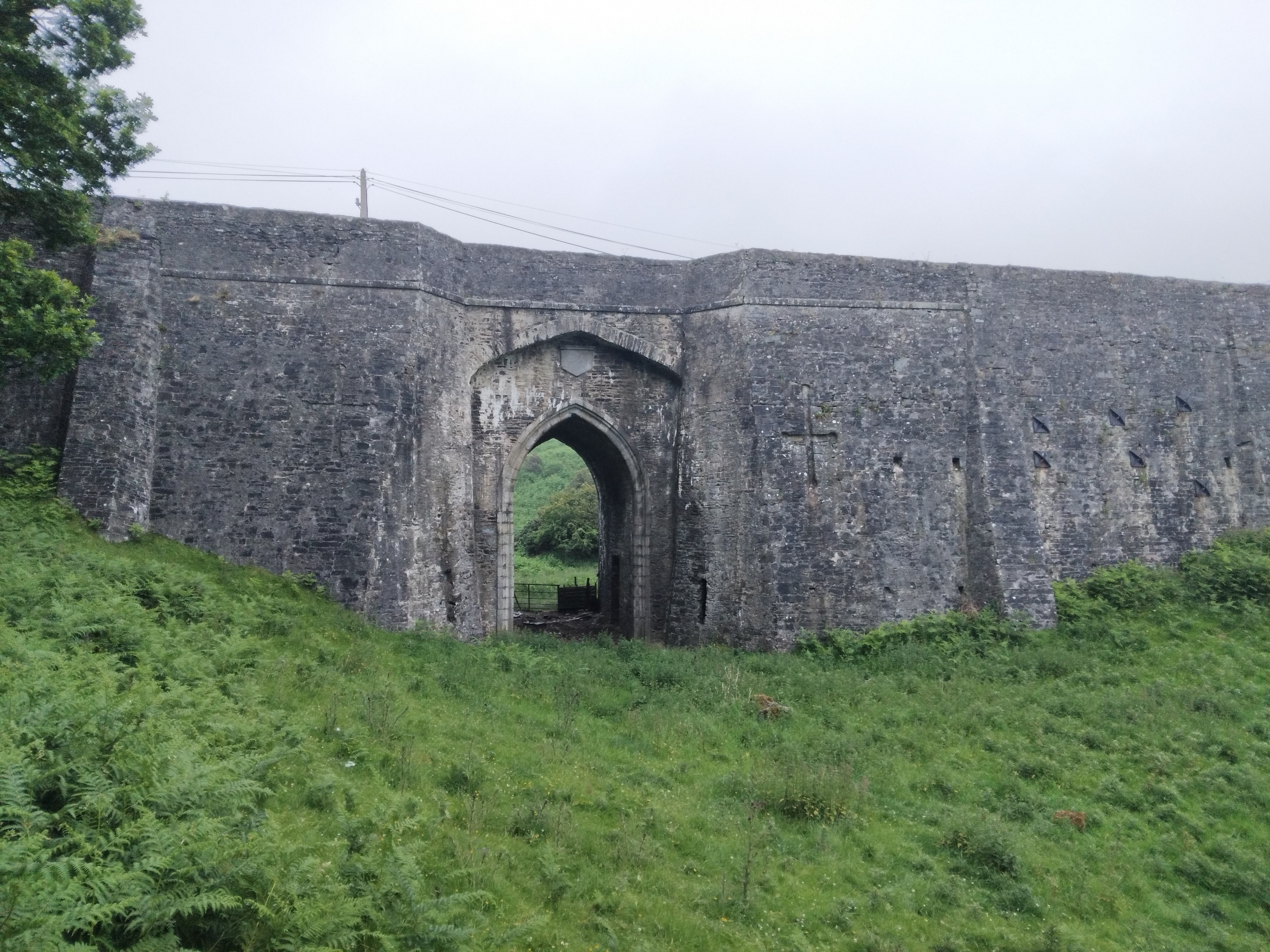
The Dry Bridge at Poulaphouca

== See also ==
- List of towns and villages in Ireland
