= Sutton railway station (Ireland) =

DART (rail) station in Dublin

Sutton Cill Fhionntain
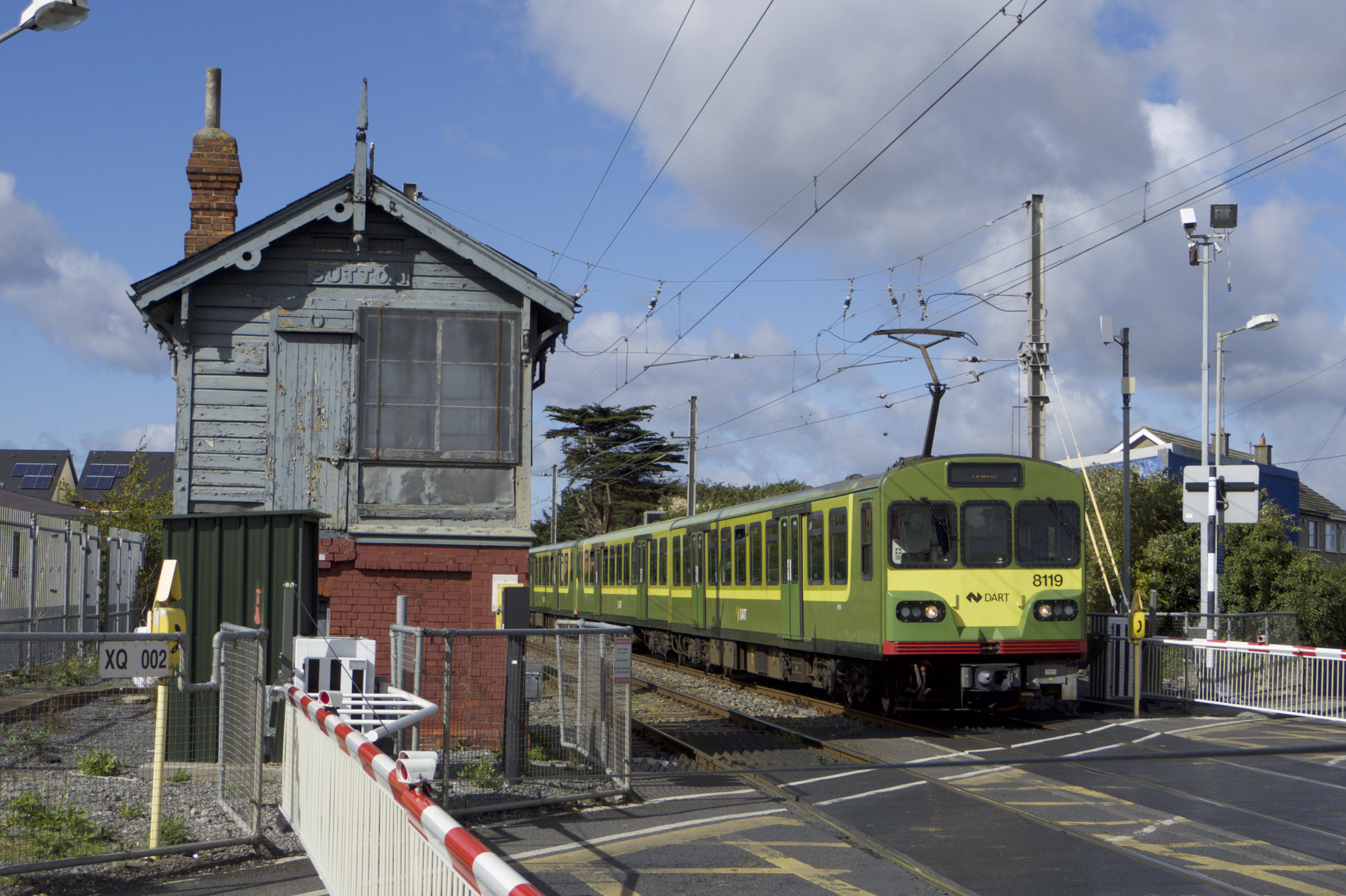
- A DART train at the level crossing at Sutton

General information
- Other names: Baldoyle and Sutton
- Location: Station Road, Sutton; Dublin; Ireland
- Coordinates: 53°23′31″N 6°06′58″W
- Owner: Iarnród Éireann
- Line: Howth branch line
- Platforms: 2
- Tracks: 2
- Bus operators: Go-Ahead Ireland
- Connections: 102; 102A; 102C; 102T

Construction
- Structure type: At-grade

Other information
- Station code: SUTTN
- Fare zone: Suburban 2

History
- Opened: 30 July 1846
- Original company: Dublin and Drogheda Railway
- Pre-grouping: Northern Railway of Ireland
- Post-grouping: Great Northern Railway (Ireland)

Key dates
- 1901: Renamed Sutton
- 1916: Renamed Sutton & Baldoyle
- 1935: Renamed Sutton
- 1959: Howth Tram service terminated
- 24 July 1984: Station upgraded

Services
Preceding station	Iarnród Éireann	Following station
Bayside towards Greystones	DART (Howth Branch)	Howth Terminus
Route map
Location

Sutton railway station (Irish: Cill Fhionntáin) is a railway station in County Dublin, Ireland that serves the village and district of Sutton, and is also accessible from Baldoyle. The station is on the coastal road from Sutton to Baldoyle, near Sutton Golf Club. The ticket office is open from 05:45 to 20:00, Monday to Sunday.

== History ==
The station opened on 30 July 1846. The Howth tram ran between here and Howth railway station until 1959.

== Services ==
=== Train Services ===
From Monday to Friday, trains run every 20-30 minutes in both directions. On Saturdays, trains run every 25-35 minutes, and on Sundays, every 30-40 minutes. Trains to Howth depart from Platform 2, while trains bound for the City Centre depart from Platform 1.

=== Bus Services ===
All bus services operate from Monday to Friday, except for the Airport Connector Bus (102), which runs on weekends, linking the DART station to the airport. These services are managed by the private operator Go-Ahead Ireland under the Transport for Ireland brand.

== See also ==
- List of railway stations in Ireland
