= Dublin United Transport Company =

Dublin United Transport Company DUTC
- Company type: Private
- Industry: Public transport
- Predecessor: The Dublin Tramways Company; The North Dublin Street Tramways Company; The Dublin Central Tramways Company
- Founded: 1891
- Defunct: 31 December 1944
- Successor: Córas Iompair Éireann
- Headquarters: Dublin, Ireland
- Area served: Dublin, Ireland

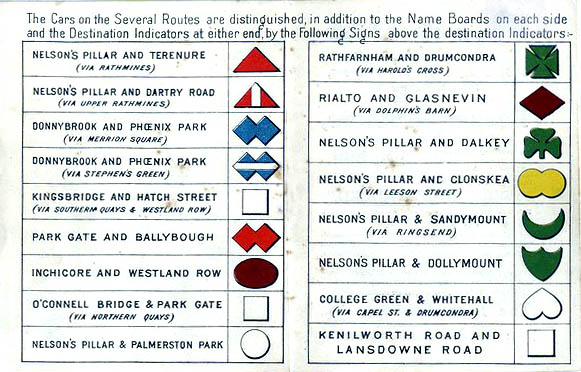
The routes in 1910

The Dublin United Transport Company (DUTC) operated trams and buses in Dublin, Ireland until 1945. Following legislation in the Oireachtas, the Transport Act, 1944, the DUTC and the Great Southern Railways were vested in the newly formed Córas Iompair Éireann on 1 January 1945.

== History ==
=== Formation ===
The DUTC was formed by the merging of several of Dublin's existing tram operators in 1881, that is:

- The Dublin Tramways Company
- The North Dublin Street Tramways Company
- The Dublin Central Tramways Company

=== Expansion and electrification ===
Electric trams, Dame Street, 1910

Dublin's first electric trams were run between Haddington Road and Dalkey in 1896, initially by the Dublin Southern Tramways Company, but soon incorporated into the DUTC, as it purchased from the Imperial Tramways Company and integrated that company, itself comprising:

- The Dublin Southern Districts Tramways Company
- The Blackrock and Kingstown Tramway

The DUTC subsequently changed its name to the Dublin United Tramways Company (1896) Limited, and later again changed the "Tramways" part of its name to "Transport" in 1941, reflecting the increasing use of buses and a reduction of the tram fleet.

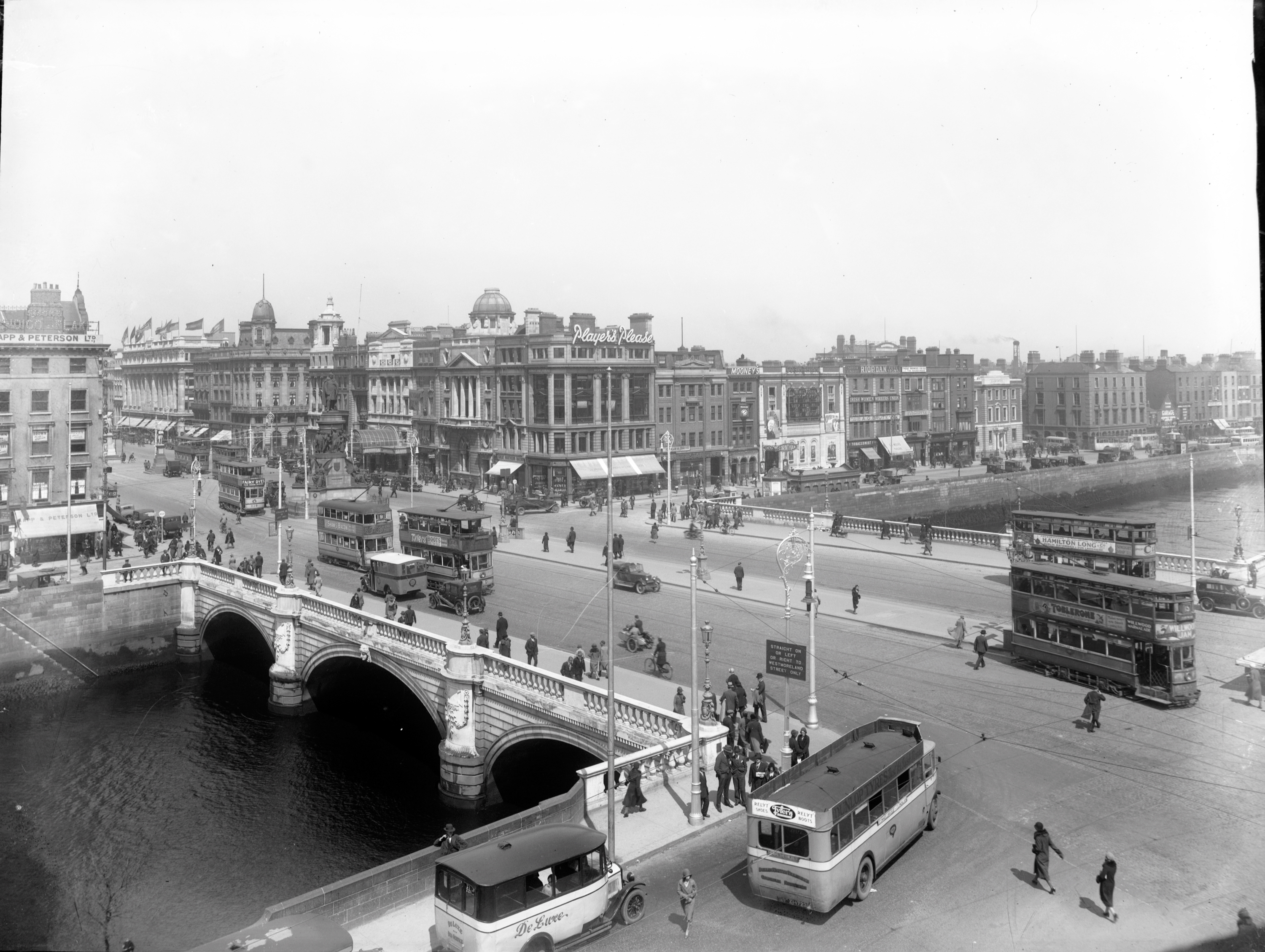
Straight on or left or right to Westmoreland Street only, with a busy O'Connell Bridge in the 1930s with double decker trams.

The DUTC's logo (sometimes known as "the Flying Snail") was adopted as the logo of CIÉ and continued to be painted on the sides of Ireland's buses and trains until the 1960s.

The company's Sandymount depot was on Gilford Road.

== Other tram companies in Dublin ==
The Hill of Howth Tramway (which closed in 1959) was never part of the DUTC, instead being operated by the Great Northern Railway (Ireland) prior to that company's incorporation into CIÉ (and the UTA) in 1958.

== Rail gauge ==
Unlike the 1,435 mm (4 ft 8 1/2 in) gauge being used by the Luas tram system (opened in 2004), the DUTC trams used two different gauges: the 5 ft 2 3/16 in (1,580 mm) gauge and 4 ft (1219.2mm).

== See also ==
- CIÉ
- Dublin Bus (a division of CIÉ and direct successor to the DUTC)
- Dublin tram system
- Luas (current tramway system operating in Dublin opened in 2004)
