= Howth railway station =

Railway station in Howth, Ireland

Howth Binn Éadair
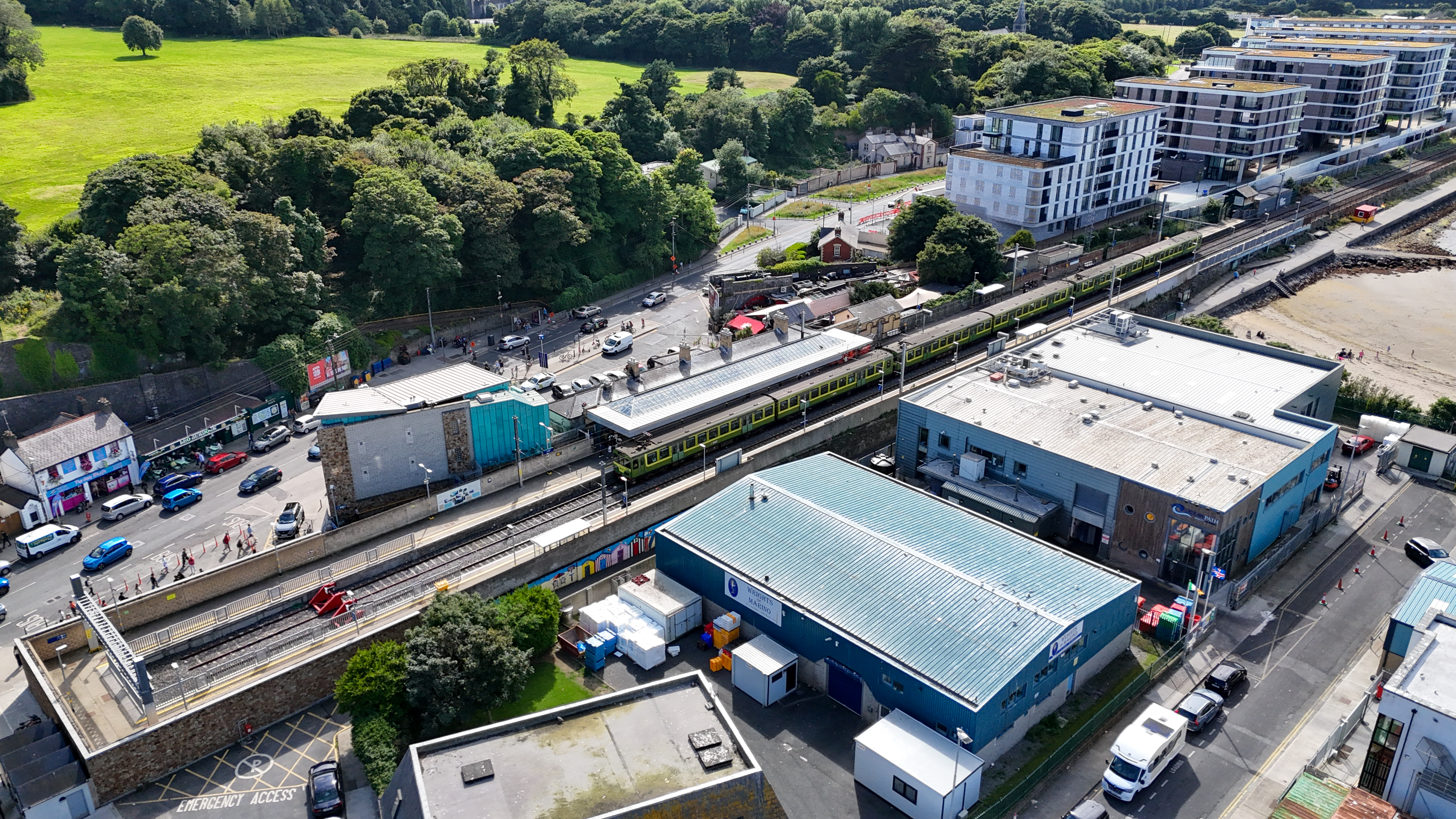
- Howth Station in 2025

General information
- Location: Howth Road, Howth; County Dublin; Ireland
- Coordinates: 53°23′21″N 6°04′27″W
- Owner: Iarnród Éireann
- Line: Howth branch line
- Platforms: 2
- Tracks: 2
- Bus operators: Dublin Bus
- Connections: 6; H3

Construction
- Structure type: At-grade

Other information
- Station code: HOWTH
- Fare zone: Suburban 2

History
- Opened: 30 May 1847
- Original company: Dublin and Drogheda Railway
- Pre-grouping: Northern Railway of Ireland
- Post-grouping: Great Northern Railway (Ireland)

Key dates
- 1959: Howth Tram service terminated
- 1983: Station upgraded
- 24 July 1984: DART services commence

Services
Preceding station	Iarnród Éireann	Following station
Sutton towards Greystones	DART (Howth Branch)	Terminus
Route map
Location

Howth station (/ˈhoʊθ/ HOHTH; Irish: Stáisiún Bhinn Éadair) is a railway station in Fingal, Ireland that serves Howth village and one side of Howth Head.

== History ==
The station opened on 30 May 1847. The Howth tram ran between here and Sutton railway station (all the way around Howth Head) until 1959. Within the station buildings (although not accessible from the platforms) are a bar and restaurant and a convenience store.

== Operations ==
Howth is a two-platform terminal station. Due to the lack of a run-round or turntable facility, on the rare occasion that a locomotive-hauled train arrives (such as on a railtour), a second locomotive must follow the train light engine from Dublin to haul the train back from Howth.

The ticket office is open from 05:45-00:30, Monday to Sunday.

=== Train services ===
From Monday to Saturday, a DART train leaves the station towards the City Centre via Dublin Connolly every 15 to 40 minutes, with the last train departing Howth at 23:55. On Sundays, the intervals between trains increase to 20 to 45 minutes.

=== Bus services ===
Both the H3 and Route 6 buses are operated by Dublin Bus. The H3 bus visits the station on average twice an hour in each direction, except on Sundays. The Route 6 bus runs hourly from the station, connecting Howth to the city centre.

== Gallery ==
Station sign (Irish: Binn Éadair)

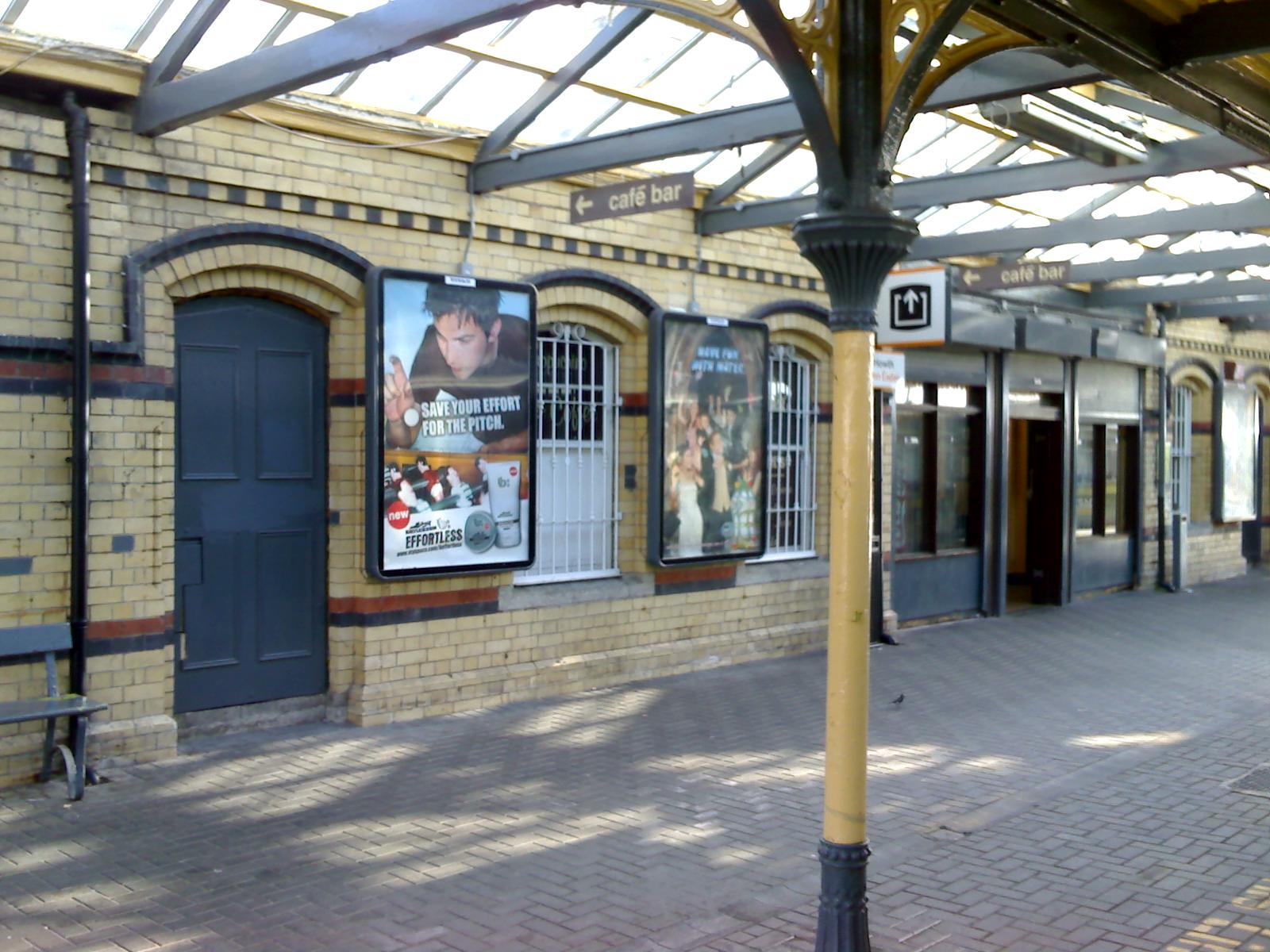
Station platform features

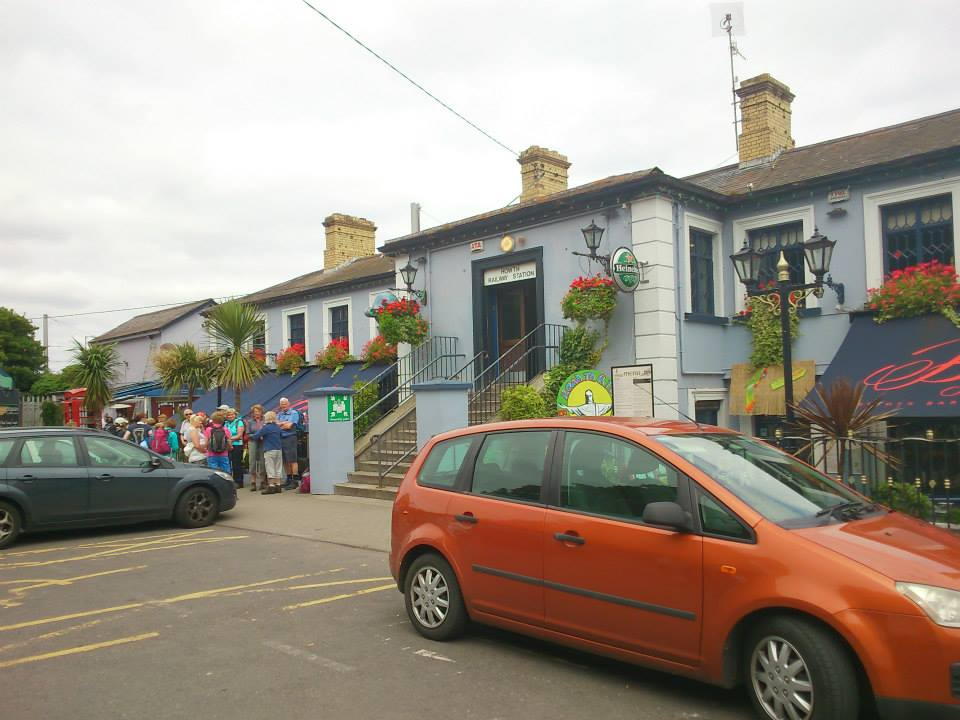
Station front in June 2014

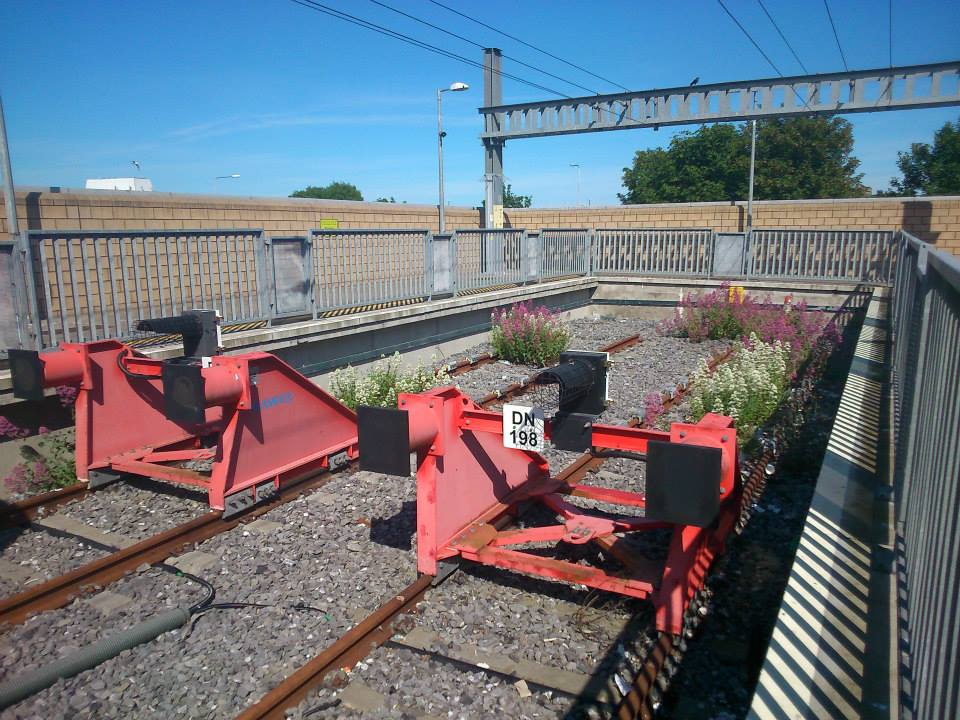
The end of the line in June 2014

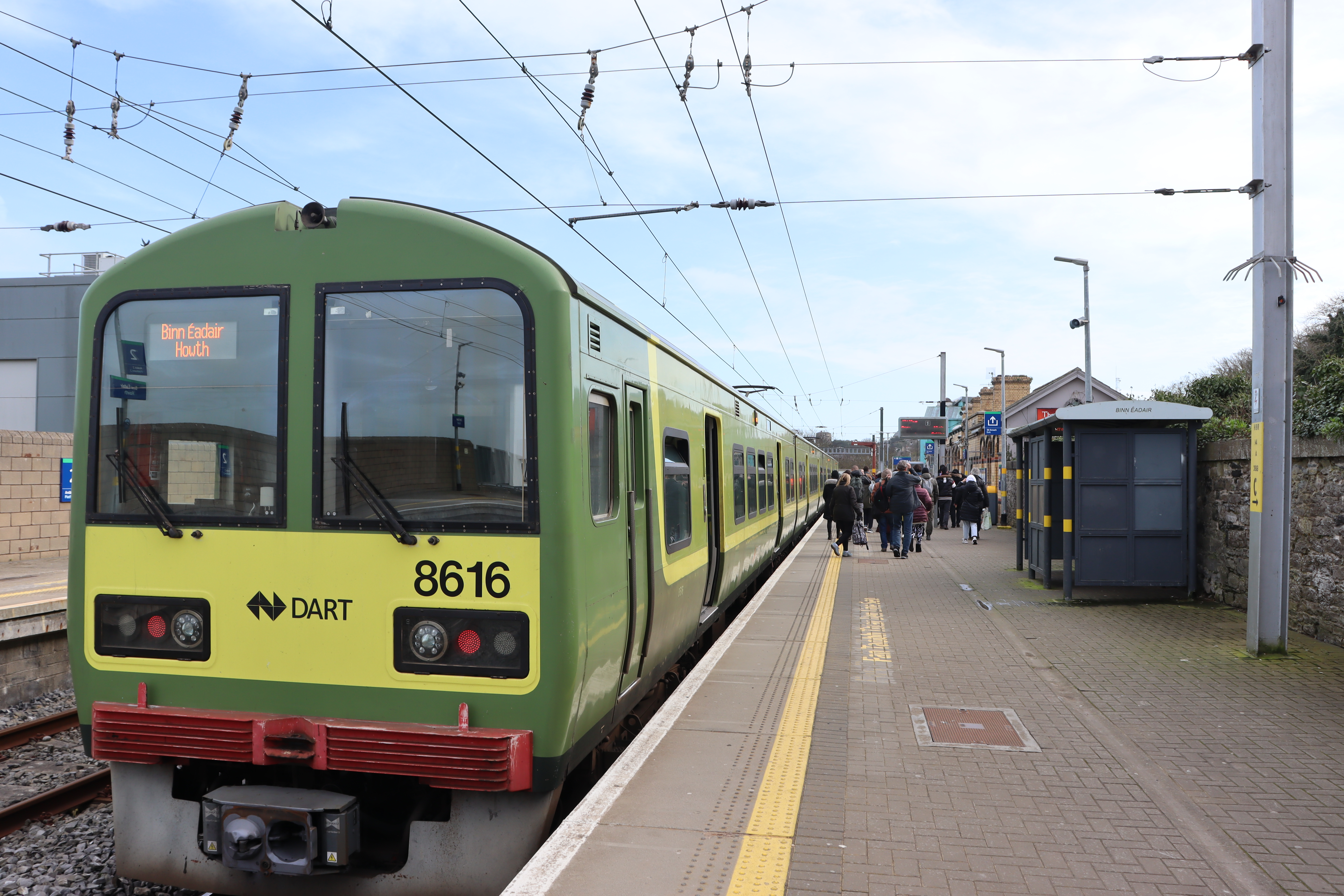
A train at Howth in March 2024

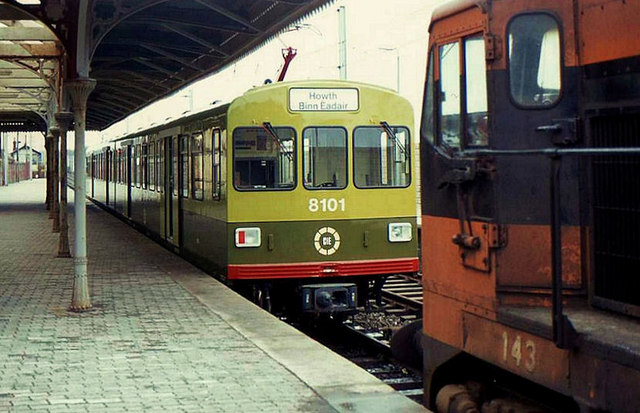
A two-car set (8301 and 8101) awaiting departure from Howth station, May 1983

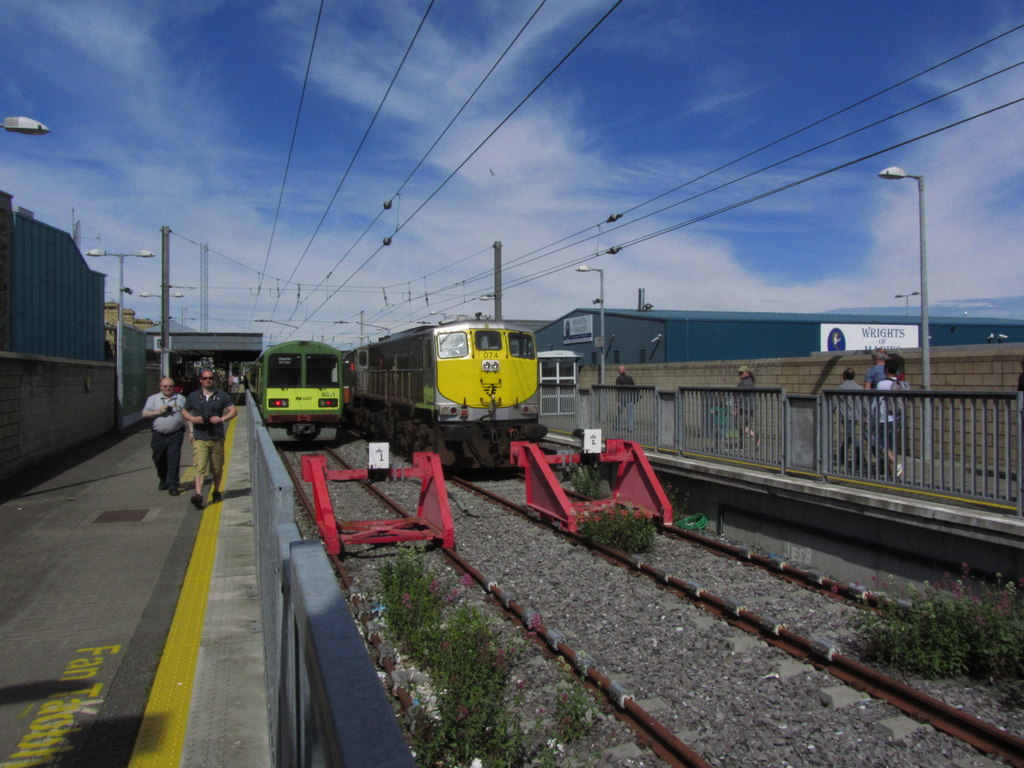
Buffer stops, May 2014

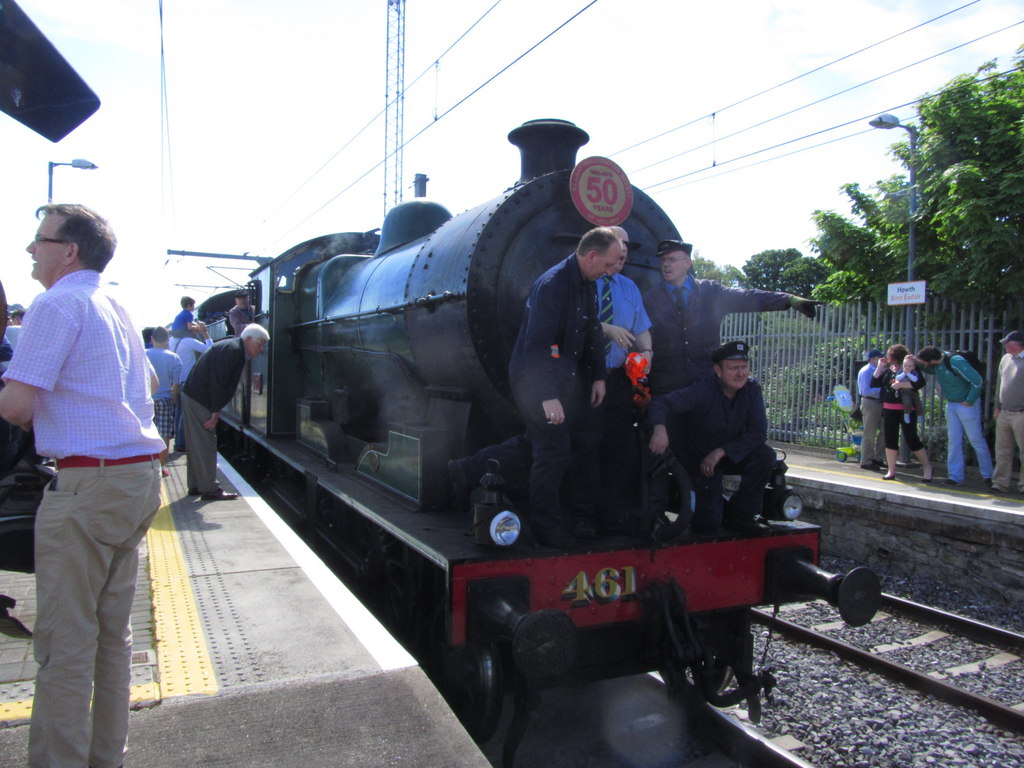
Steam excursion at Howth Station, May 2014

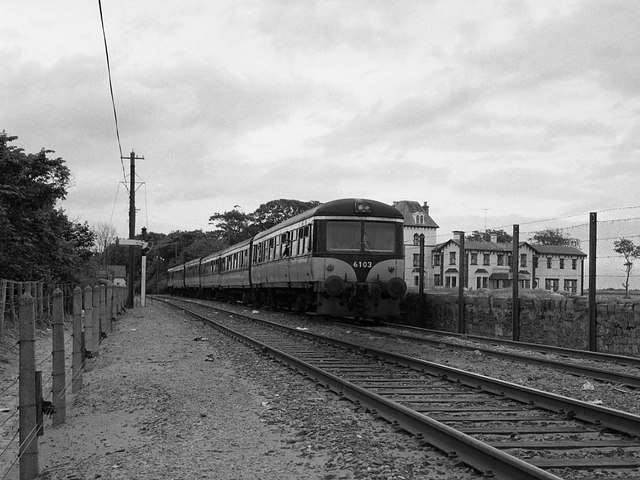
One of CIE's 201 class diesel locomotives approaching Howth Station, August 1980

== See also ==
- List of railway stations in Ireland
- Howth
