= Galloway (surname) =

Galloway is a Scottish surname. It is a toponym taken from the Galloway region of southern Scotland. Notable people with the surname include:

- Alexander Galloway (1895–1977), British Army officer
- Alexander R. Galloway (born 1974), American author
- Beverly Thomas Galloway (1863–1936), American plant pathologist
- Brent Galloway (1944–2014), American linguist
- C. M. Galloway (1875–1954), head of the United States Civil Service Commission
- Chick Galloway (1896–1969), baseball player
- David Galloway (disambiguation), multiple people
- Don Galloway (1937–2009), American actor
- Drew McIntyre, ring name of Andrew "Drew" Galloway (born 1985), Scottish wrestler
- Eilene Galloway (1906–2009), American space law researcher and editor
- George Galloway (cricketer) (1803–1867), English cricketer
- George Galloway (born 1954), British politician
- Gerald Edward Galloway Jr., American engineer and brigadier general
- Janice Galloway (born 1955), writer
- Jeff Galloway (1945–2026), American athlete and author
- Jenny Galloway, British actress
- Jim Galloway (baseball) (1887–1950), baseball player
- Joey Galloway (born 1971), American football player
- John Galloway (disambiguation), multiple people
- Jonathan Galloway (born 1996), Guamanian basketball player
- Joseph Galloway (1731–1803), Loyalist during the American Revolutionary War
- Joseph L. Galloway (1941–2021), American journalist
- Keith Galloway (born 1985), Australian rugby player
- Kevin Galloway (born 1988), American-Iraqi basketball player
- LaDarius Galloway (born 1997), American football player
- Lee Galloway (1871–1962), American educator, publisher, and organizational theorist
- Langston Galloway (born 1991), basketball player
- Manning Galloway (born 1960), American boxer
- Matt Galloway, Canadian radio personality and journalist
- Michael Galloway (disambiguation), multiple people
- Nicole Galloway, American politician from Missouri
- Pat Galloway (1957–2024), American engineer
- Paul Galloway (1934–2009), American newspaper reporter
- Paul Vernon Galloway (died 1990), Methodist bishop
- Peter Galloway (born 1954), British Anglican priest and historian
- Robert Galloway (mining engineer) (1844–1908) Scottish mining engineer and author
- Robert Galloway (tennis) (born 1992), American tennis player
- Samuel Galloway (1811–1872), American politician from Ohio
- Scott Galloway (soccer) (born 1995), Australian footballer
- Scott Galloway (professor), American entrepreneur, academic and author
- Steve Galloway (born 1963), English football player and coach
- Steven Galloway (writer) (born 1975), Canadian novelist
- Sue Galloway, American actress and comedian
- Tamara Galloway, British marine scientist
- Trey Galloway (born 2001), American basketball player
- William Galloway (disambiguation), multiple people

== See also ==
- Galloway (disambiguation)
