= Galloways =

Galloways may refer to:

- Galloway's Society for the Blind, charity in Lancashire, England
- Galloways Bakers, chain of pie shops in North West England
- W & J Galloway & Sons, known from 1931 as Galloways Ltd, maker of steam engines and boilers based in Manchester, England

== See also ==
- Galloway (disambiguation)
