= William Galloway =

William Galloway may refer to:

- Sir William Galloway (mining engineer) (1840–1927), British mining engineer and professor of mining
- William McNaughton Galloway (1840–1895), mayor of Brisbane, Queensland, Australia
- William Wilding Galloway (1854–1936), English businessman in the cotton industry
- William Johnson Galloway (1868–1931), British businessman and Conservative politician
- Hippo Galloway (William Hipple Galloway, fl. 1900), American baseball player
