= Cedric Robinson (guide) =

British walking guide (1933–2021)

Cedric Robinson MBE
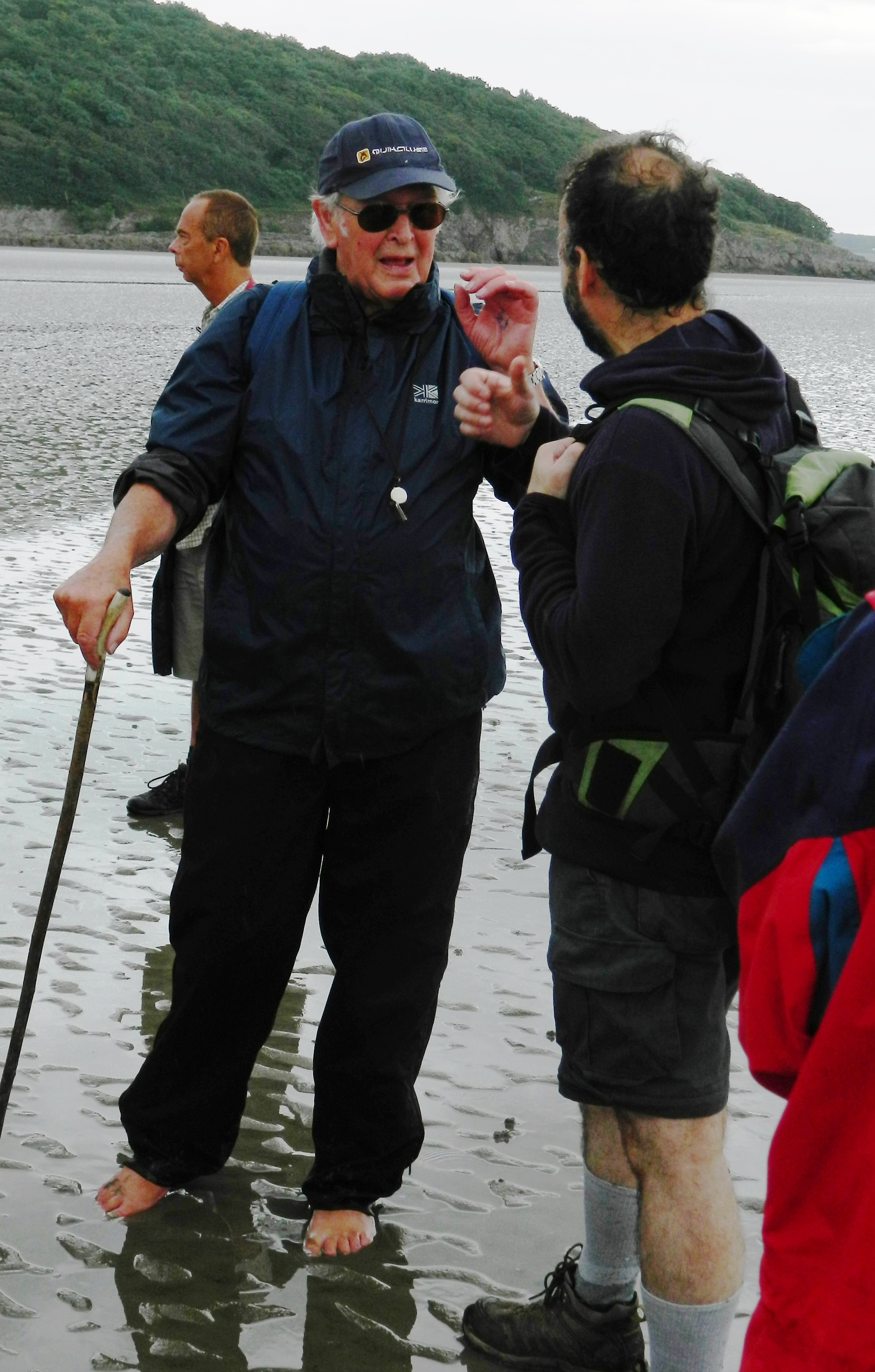
- Leading a walk across the sands in 2014
- Born: 17 February 1933; Flookburgh, Lancashire, England
- Died: 19 November 2021 (aged 88)
- Occupations: Guide; author
- Title: Queen's Guide to the Sands
- Term: 1963–2019

Cedric Robinson MBE (17 February 1933 – 19 November 2021) was a British guide who held the position of Queen's Guide to the Sands, the recognised escort for travellers across the dangerous tidal sands of Morecambe Bay in north west England, for 56 years.

== Early life and appointment ==
Robinson was born on 17 February 1933 at 4, Market Cross, in Flookburgh, Cumbria (at that time in Lancashire). His family were fishermen, and he spent much of his time out on the sands picking cockles with his father. He was appointed in October 1963, as the 25th Guide. He later reminisced: "It was the officer of the sands that mentioned the former guide was retiring – I had never thought of it before but after he had called round with the details I decided to go for it".

== Queen's Guide to the Sands ==
The shifting course of the River Kent and the fast moving tides make the task of leading a safe crossing of Morecambe Bay a challenge. Robinson would set out a safe route the day before a crossing, marking it out with laurel "brobs", branches stuck in the sand as markers which would survive being underwater at high tide. On some occasions walks had to be cancelled because of heavy rain in the previous days leading to a dangerous flow of water, or because of severe weather on the day of the walk. As an example, in 2017 the charity Galloway's Society for the Blind had to cancel two walks planned for a weekend in September which were rescheduled from an earlier weekend in the year when they had also been cancelled.

Robinson led many parties across the sands, most commonly from Arnside to Kents Bank, often with a large group of up to 600 people raising money for charities. During his time as guide the walks he led raised over £1 million for charity. In 1985 he guided Prince Philip across the sands in a horse-drawn carriage, and on a later occasion took Rick Stein across the sands while being filmed for television.

He published several books about his life and work, some of them illustrated by his wife Olive (1925–2021).

== Retirement, successor and death ==
Robinson's retirement was announced in April 2019. It was Lord Cavendish in his role as chair of the Guide Over Sands Trust who visited the 86-year-old Robinson and suggested that it was time to retire: "'At the age you've got to, Mr Robinson – Cedric,' he said, 'we'd like to take the responsibility away from you and we would like you to choose a new guide'". He chose his successor, Michael Wilson, a 46-year-old fisherman from Flookburgh, and would have a continuing ambassadorial and advisory role.

Cedric Robinson died on 19 November 2021. His wife Olive had died in August 2021. The Guide Over Sands Trust's announcement of the news of Robinson's death ended with the words: "Now Cedric it is time to rest your sandy feet and keep an eye on us from up there." A longer tribute was published by Dickon Knight, Clerk and Agent of the trust, on 1 December 2021.

== Recognition ==
Robinson was appointed MBE in the 1999 Birthday Honours, "for services to the community in Cumbria". The University of Cumbria awarded him an honorary fellowship in November 2013, "In recognition of his outstanding service to the community and significant contribution to supporting charitable causes, both locally and globally."

A street in Grange-over-Sands is named Cedric Walk in Robinson's honour, and in 2016 a bronze plaque with an impression of his feet was installed there and dedicated by Patrick Kelly, the Archbishop of Liverpool.

== Publications ==
- Robinson, Cedric; Robinson, Olive (1980). Sand Pilot of Morecambe Bay. David & Charles. ISBN 978-0715379158.
- Robinson, Cedric; Mitchell, W.R. (1986). Life Around Morecambe Bay. Dalesman. ISBN 978-0852068656.
- Robinson, Cedric (2003). 40 Years on Morecambe Bay. Great Northern Books. ISBN 0-9544002-2-4.
- Robinson, Cedric (2007). Between the Tides: The Perilous Beauty of Morecambe Bay. Great Northern Books. ISBN 978-1905080335.
- Robinson, Cedric (2009). Sandman: The Autobiography of Cedric Robinson - The Queen's Guide to the Sands. Great Northern Books. ISBN 978-1905080625.
- Robinson, Cedric (2013). Time and Tide: 50 Golden Years on Morecambe Bay. Great Northern Books. ISBN 978-0957295162.

== See also ==
- Cross Bay Walk
