= Thomas Kirkwood =

Thomas Kirkwood may refer to:

- Tom Kirkwood (born 1951), English biologist
- Thomas William Kirkwood (1884–?), Scottish polo player
