= Sutton Castle =

Castellated mansion house

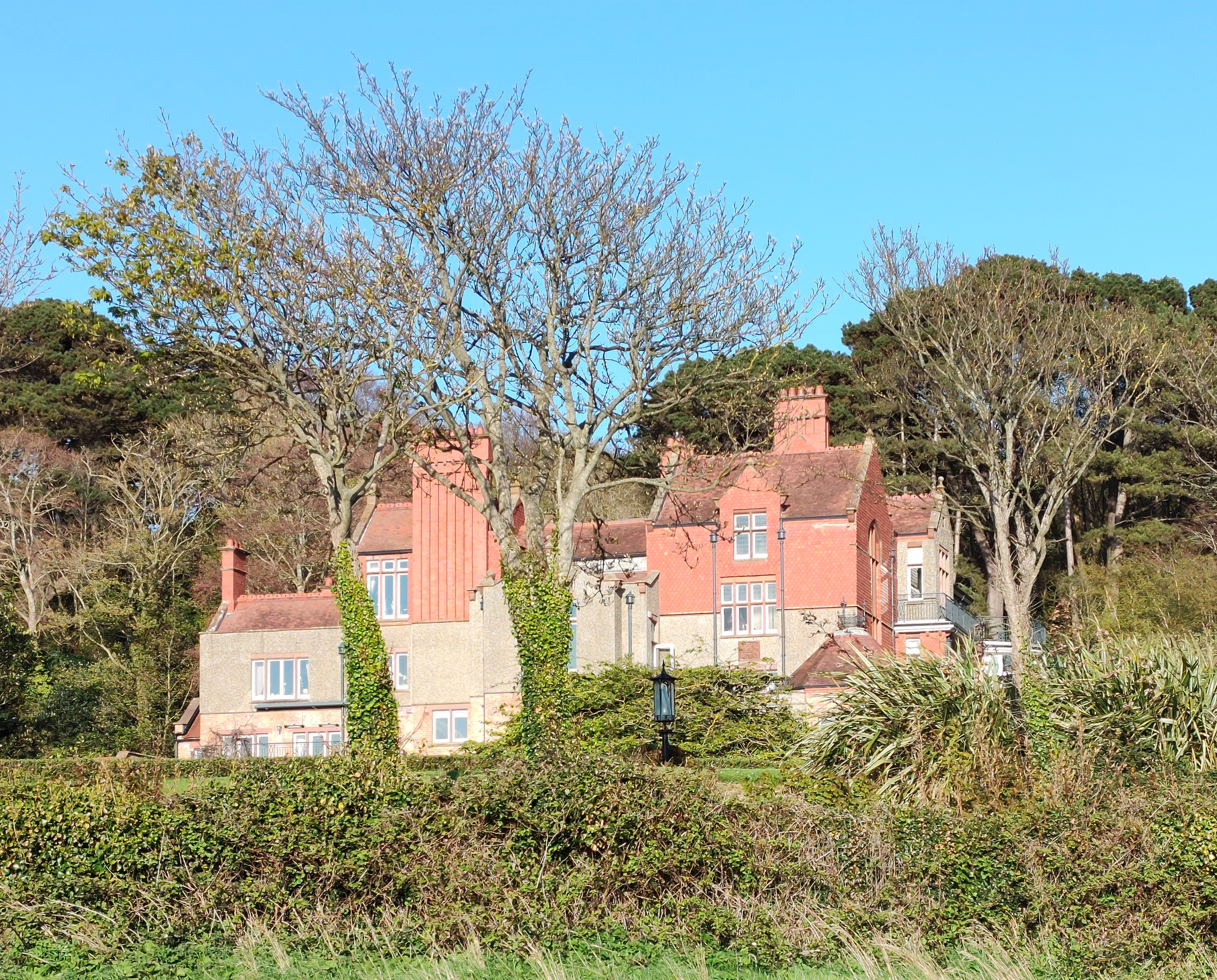
- A view of the main house in April 2022

- Location within Dublin
- Former names: Sutton House

General information
- Architectural style: Tudor revival
- Classification: Privately owned and rental apartments
- Location: Sutton, Dublin, Dublin, Ireland
- Coordinates: 53.37140540048282°N 6.093819719412983°W
- Construction started: 1892
- Completed: 1895
- Renovated: 2001

Design and construction
- Architect: Alfred Darbyshire

Website
- http://mknpropertygroup.com/portfolio/sutton-castle-sutton-dublin-13/

Sutton Castle or Sutton House is a Victorian Tudor-style castellated mansion house with terraced gardens on the southern coast of Howth Head, overlooking Dublin Bay, in County Dublin, Ireland.

== History ==
The current house replaced an earlier Sutton House which was demolished and had previously been occupied by the senior judge Joseph Devonsher Jackson and later by Alice Lawrenson and Rev William Lawrenson, prebendary of Howth. Prior to the construction of the earlier Sutton House the land was owned by the Hackett Family and a substantial 16th century castle house stood on its grounds roughly near the location of the current castle gates. It was said to be an English-like stone house and was rated for six hearths.

=== Modern house ===
The current house was designed for industrialist and politician Andrew Jameson, great-grandson of John Jameson, by Manchester-based architect Alfred Darbyshire, who had previously worked on some of the Jameson distilleries. Located in the townland of Sutton South, it was constructed around the year 1880 on lands spanning the Bailey area of Howth and neighbouring Sutton.

=== Hotel ===
The house was converted into a 19-bedroom hotel in the 1970s called Sutton House Hotel and later Sutton Castle Hotel. It was sold, along with 7 acres of gardens and woodland, for IR£2.55m in September 1997.

The building continued to operate as a hotel for a period. It later operated as a temporary centre for asylum seekers and specifically unaccompanied minors until 2001.

The hotel was converted into 17 luxury apartments by the McKeown Group and Paddy Doyle between 2003 and 2005.

== Notable residents ==
- The judge Joseph Devonsher Jackson
- The politician Andrew Jameson and later his daughter Harriet Kirkwood
- The Flemish businessman Albert Luykx

== Status and features ==
The house is recorded in the Fingal County Council Record of Protected Structures (RPS 0578) with the description Late 19th century four-storey Victorian Tudor-style house & gates, extended and converted into apartment complex.

The main house, situated on terraces, has four storeys, and overlooks Dublin Bay. It has a Gothic porch, terracotta tiling, and art deco-style chimneys, and the original bay and window structure is retained. A modern one- and two-storey extension to the west was added around 1990. The lobby and some of the original reception rooms remain, the latter now incorporated into some of the modern apartments. The main stairway was retained and restored, and a lift was added prior to the sale as apartments. Eight apartments were formed in the main house, and nine in the western extension.

The house was damaged by fire in 1925 while newlywed Jameson and Ruth Hart were on honeymoon in New York but was later restored to its original condition.

== Popular culture ==
The hotel and grounds were used as the background for the cover of the Van Morrisson album Veedon Fleece, in a photograph which was taken while he was staying at the hotel in 1974.

Bono and Ali Hewson had their wedding reception at the hotel in 1982.

== Martello Tower ==
A nearby Martello Tower, right on the coast, in the area known as Red Rock, and constructed in 1804, is also listed on the Record of Protected Structures for Fingal (RPS 0579). It was the first of around 29 Martello Towers to be constructed in the Greater Dublin area and was referred to as Tower Number 1. The tower previously formed part of the grounds of Sutton Castle, at various times being leased and owned by Andrew Jameson and accessed via the same gate at Sutton House, but has since been detached, and converted into holiday rental accommodation.

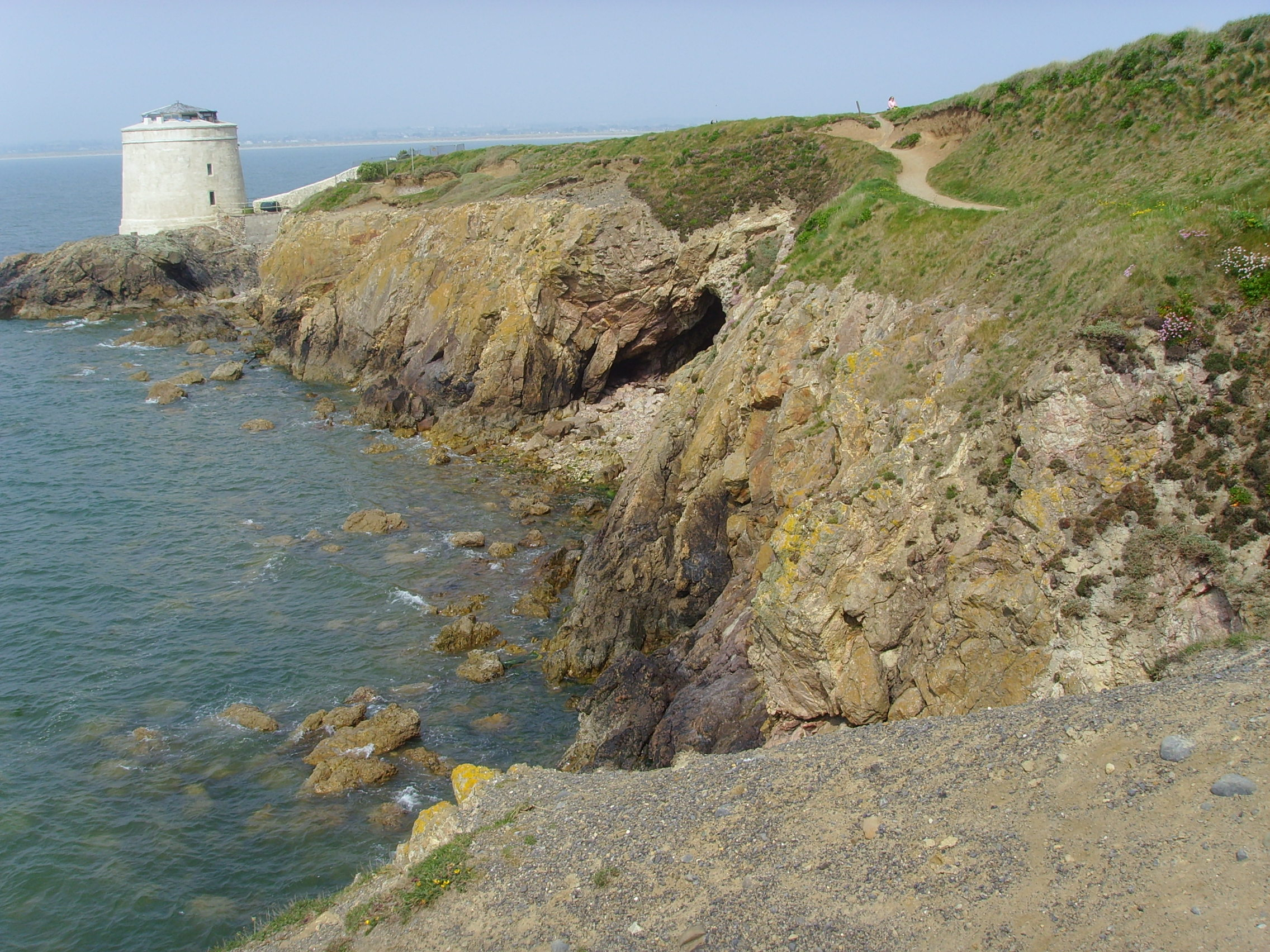
The Martello Tower at Red Rock in 2007

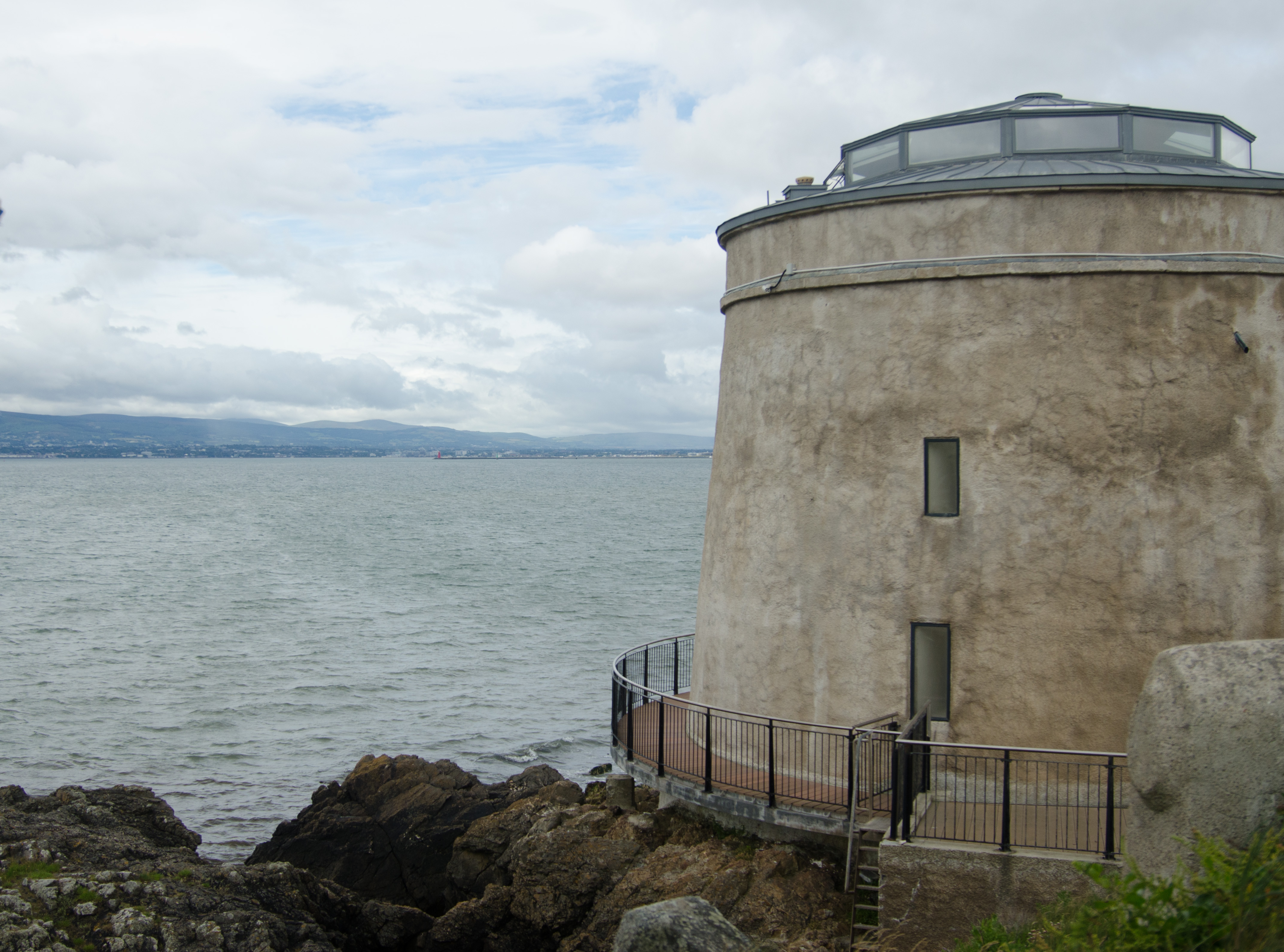
A view across Dublin bay from the tower in 2017

== See also ==
- Bettyglen House, Raheny - a sister house in the Arts and Crafts style built in 1910 by George Jameson which was converted into 10 luxury apartments in 2020
- St. Marnocks - a nearby Jameson family house in Portmarnock, owned by John Jameson and now a hotel
