= Robert Galloway =

Robert Galloway may refer to:

- Robert Galloway (mining engineer) (1844–1908), Scottish mining engineer and author
- Robert Galloway (tennis) (born 1992), American tennis player
