= Alfred Darbyshire =

British architect (1839–1908)

Alfred Darbyshire FRIBA
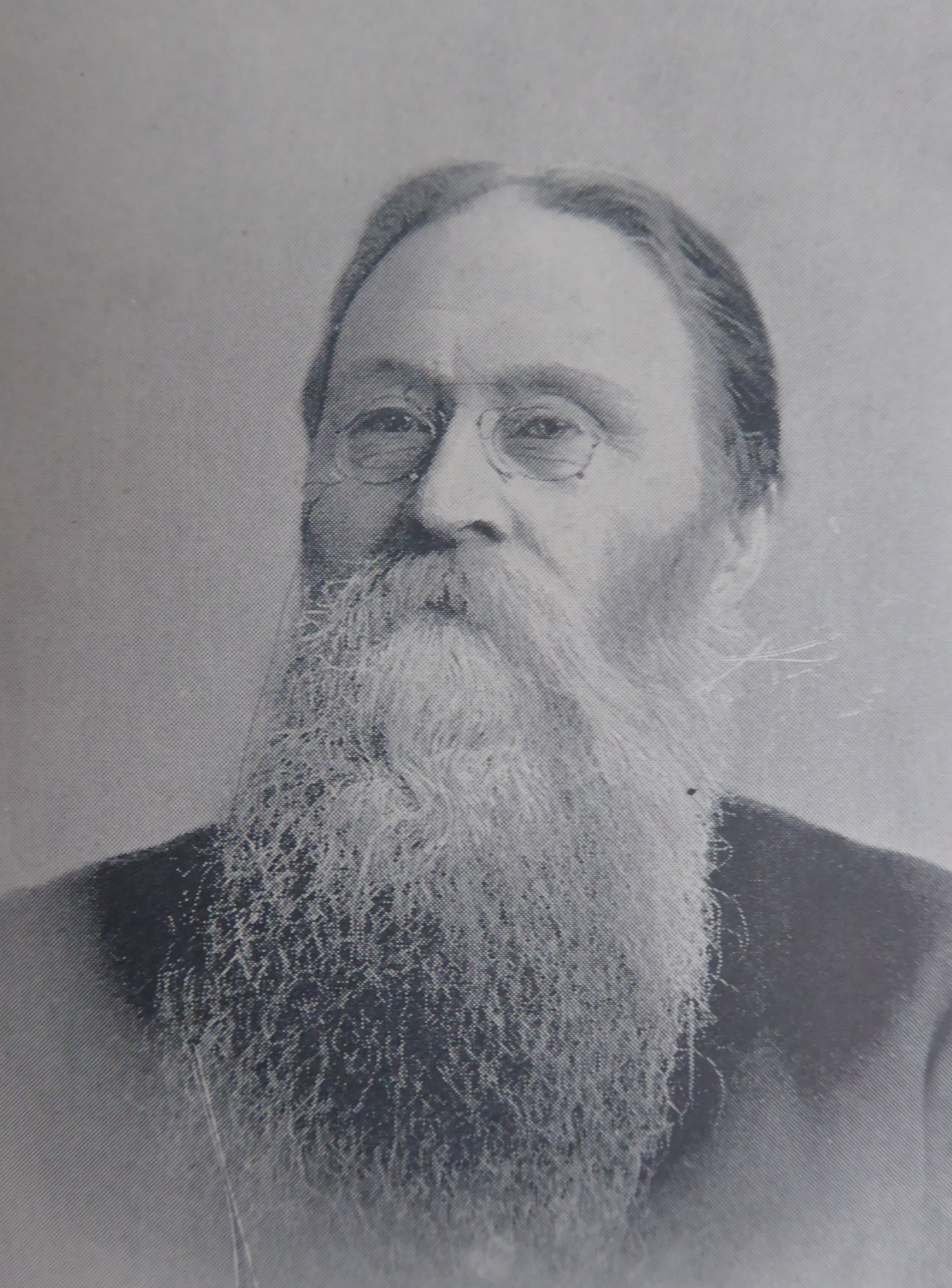
- Darbyshire, c. 1894
- Born: 20 June 1839; Salford, Lancashire
- Died: 5 July 1908 (aged 69); Manchester, Lancashire
- Education: Ackworth School; Manchester School of Art
- Occupations: Architect; author; painter
- Spouse: Sarah Marshall
- Children: 4

Alfred Darbyshire (20 June 1839 – 5 July 1908) was a British architect.

== Education and career ==
Alfred Darbyshire was born on 20 June 1839 in Salford, Lancashire, to William Darbyshire, the manager of a dyeworks, and his wife Mary née Bancroft. He was a nephew of George Bradshaw, the compiler of railway guides. His education began at the Quaker school in Manchester and continued from 1852 at the Quaker Ackworth School where his artistic abilities were recognised and encouraged by Henry Sparkes. He completed his education at Lindow Grove Academy, Alderley.

On leaving school, Darbyshire was articled to P. B. Alley of the architects' firm of Lane and Alley in Manchester and enrolled in the Manchester School of Art. In 1862, he established his own architectural practice at St James's Square, Manchester. Early commissions included additions to Lyme Hall and a house in Newton-le-Willows. He was one of the founders of the first Manchester Architectural Association.

Frederick Bennett Smith joined him as a partner from about 1885 to 1905. Darbyshire died in Manchester in 1908 and was buried at Flixton Church.

== Works ==
Darbyshire admired the Gothic Revival style of Alfred Waterhouse but also designed in the neoclassical style. He is best known for his theatrical architecture. He designed Manchester's Gaiety Theatre and a theatre at Rawtenstall, and carried out alterations at Manchester's Theatre Royal and the Prince's theatres. In London he altered and decorated the Lyceum Theatre.

Concerned by the danger of fire in theatres, he worked with the actor Henry Irving to develop the Irving-Darbyshire safety plan which consisted of isolating separate parts of the theatre and providing fireproof escape routes. He first implemented this plan when he rebuilt the Theatre Royal, Exeter which had been destroyed in the Exeter Theatre Royal fire in 1887, killing 186 people. His last major theatre was the Palace of Varieties in Manchester.

Other buildings designed by Darbyshire include Pendleton Town Hall, Manchester Corporation Abattoir, Alston Hall in Lancashire, the Carnegie Library in Knutsford and the churches of St Cyprian and St Ignatius in Salford. He made designs for temporary exhibitions, including a military bazaar in Manchester in 1884, a Shakespearean show in the Royal Albert Hall the same year and in the Royal Jubilee Exhibition in Manchester in 1887.

Darbyshire was also involved in the design of several distilleries and factories for the Jameson family and was later engaged by Andrew Jameson to design a Tudor revival style mansion house for the family on Howth Head in the Northern suburbs of Dublin called Sutton House.

== Theatre ==
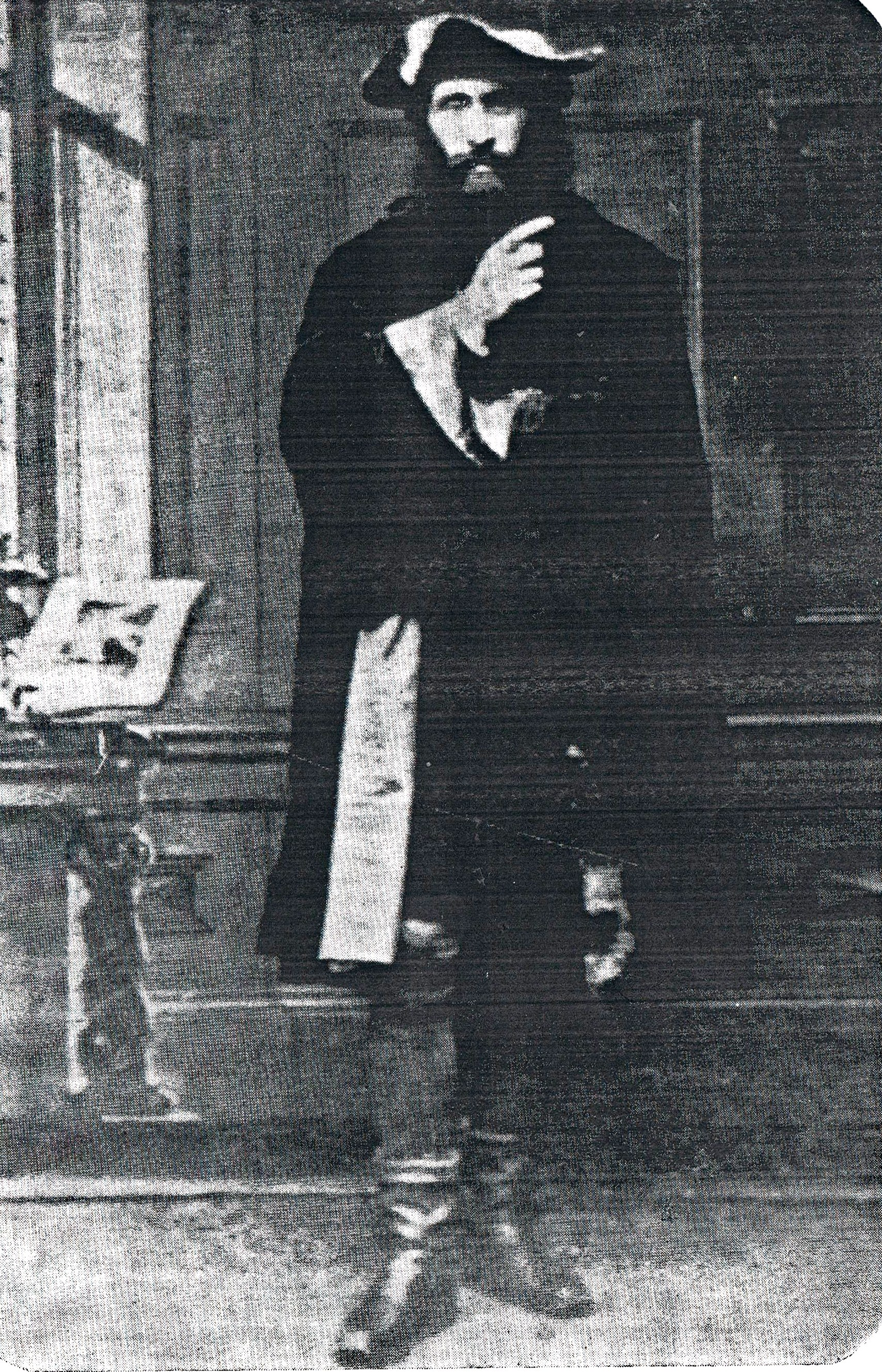
Darbyshire as Jacques in As You Like It

Alfred Darbyshire was a man of many talents, which centred on the theatre. As well as building them, he acted in them and became famous for his extravagant stage productions.

In 1869, Charles Calvert, actor-manager of the Prince's Theatre, Manchester, employed Alfred to redecorate the theatre. They became good friends and Alfred assisted Calvert with the staging of some of his great 'revivals' of Shakespeare's plays.

In 1872, he built a spectacular set for the triumphal entry of the King into London in Henry V. He reproduced the streets of London, the seaport of Southampton, the walled town of Harfleur, the battlefield of Agincourt, the palaces of Westminster and Rouen, and the cathedral of Troyes. It contained between two and three hundred persons. The production was carried through the United States and into Australia. In New York, more than 100,000 people visited Booth's Theatre to see the play.

=== Paintings ===
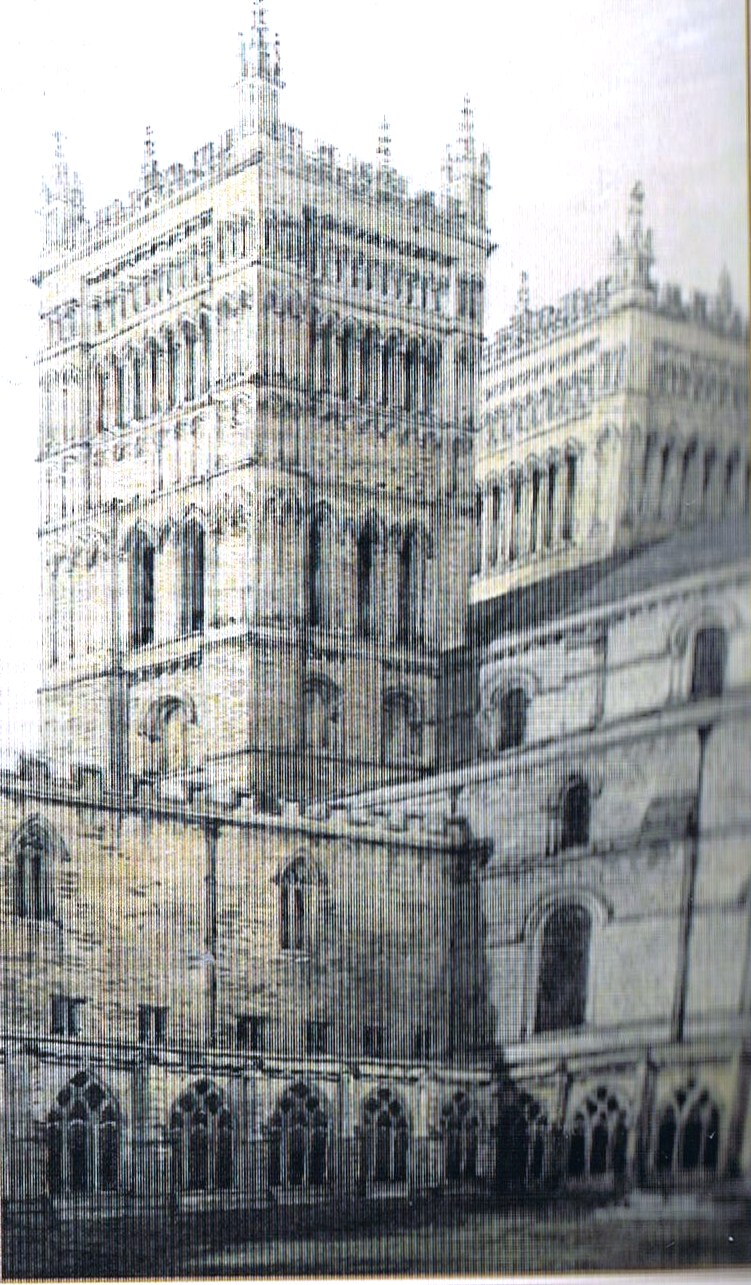

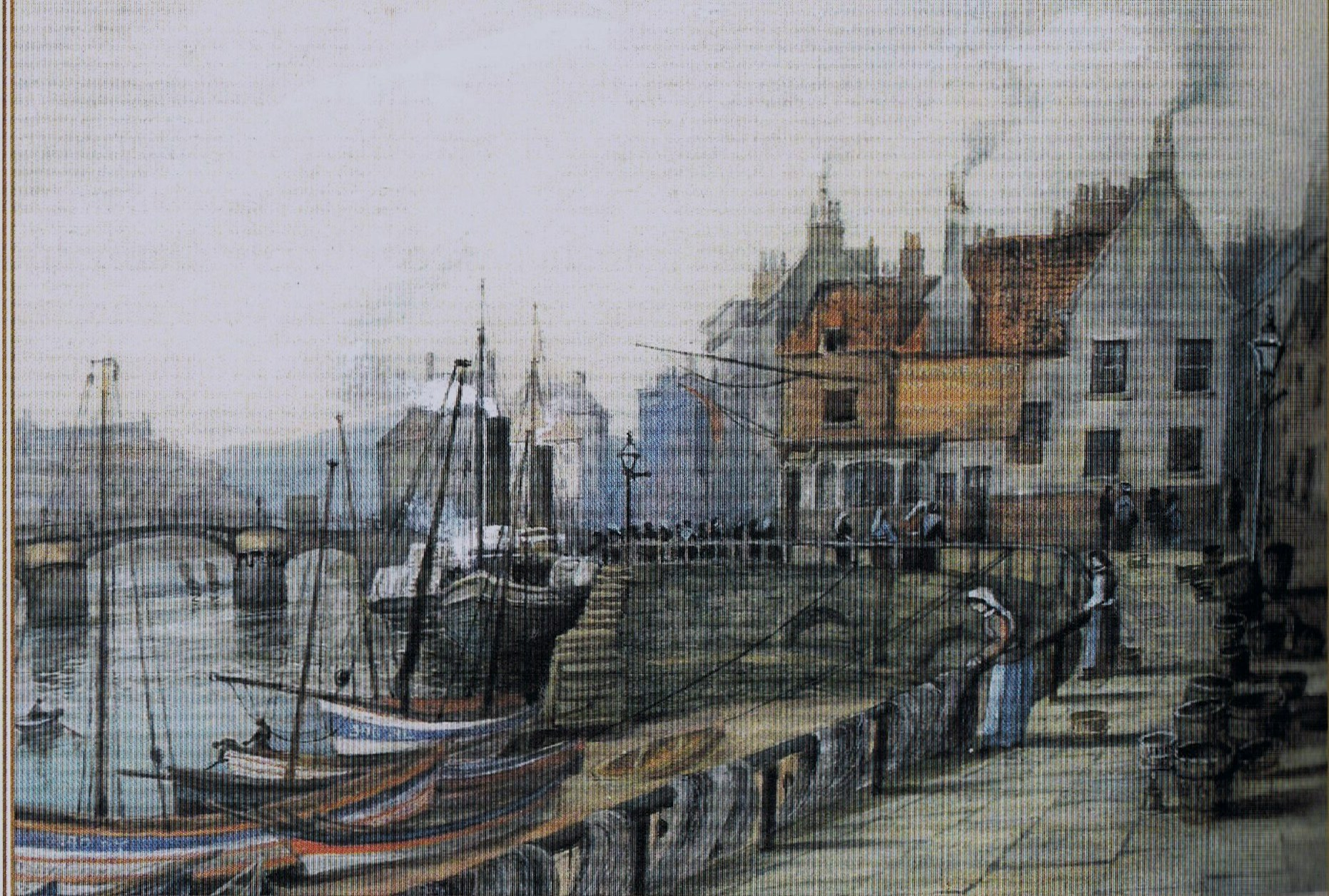

As a landscape painter, Darbyshire sketched and painted in Italy, France, Belgium, and Germany. He was friendly with Dante Gabriel Rossetti, Ford Madox Brown, and Walter Crane. Alfred could produce an intricate architectural watercolour depicting Durham Cathedral, or a busy colourful picture of a harbour in Whitby, now both in Stockport Art Gallery.

=== Writing ===
Darbyshire was an art critic for the Manchester Guardian from 1868 to 1874 and thereafter, until 1905, he was an art critic for the Manchester Courier. He wrote a number of books on architecture, heraldry, and art – including A Booke of Olde Manchester and Salford containing about 70 illustrations of ancient buildings, which he compiled for the Jubilee celebrations of 1887.

He published a volume The Art of the Victorian Stage, and innumerable pamphlets and brochures for occasions such as the Old Manchester and Salford Exhibition. He also wrote an autobiography.

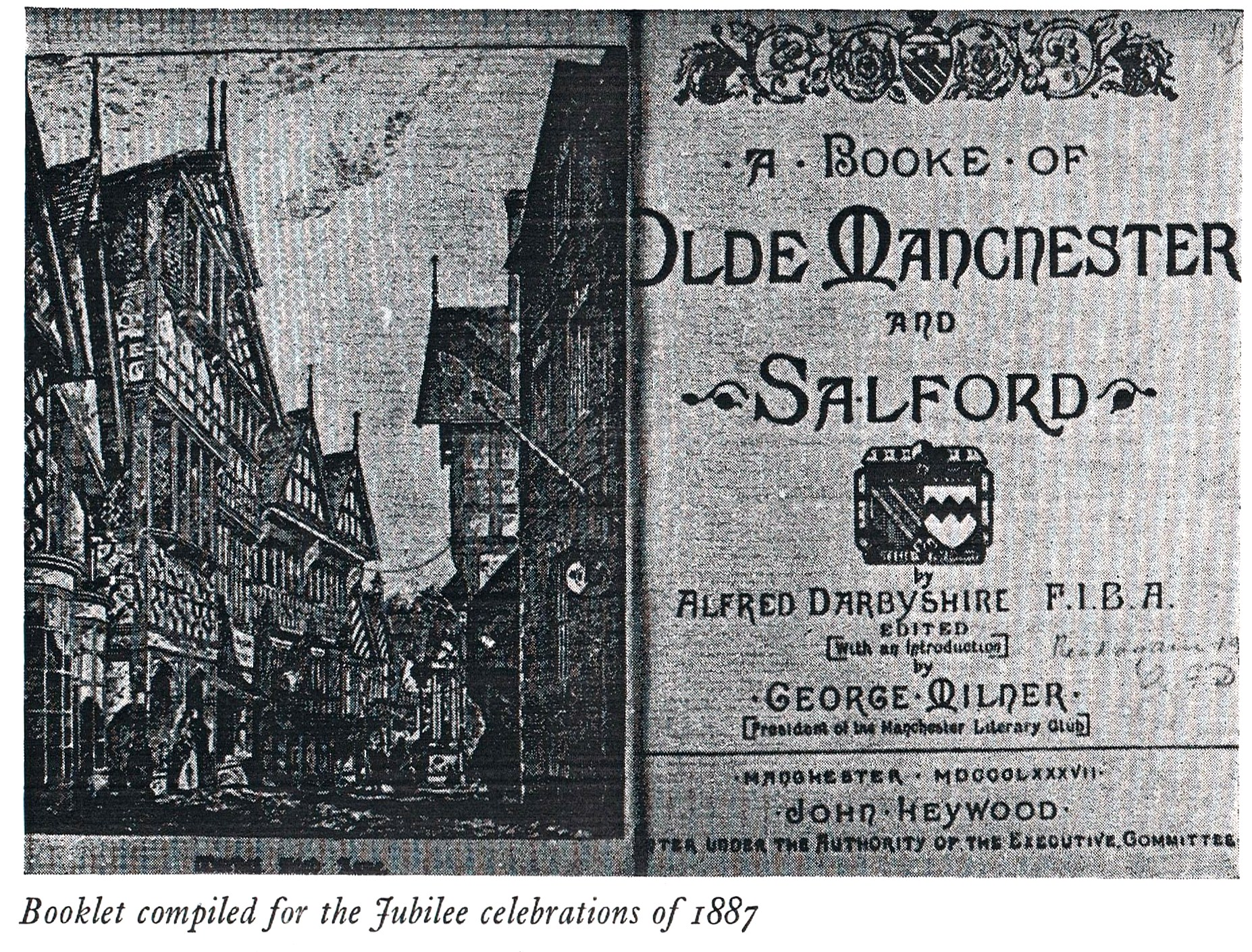

== Publications ==
- A Booke of Olde Manchester and Salford (1887)
- A Chronicle of the Brasenose Club, Manchester (in two volumes, 1892–1900)
- An Architect's Experiences: Professional, Artistic and Theatrical (1897)
- The Art of the Victorian Stage (1907)

== Personal life ==
In 1870, Darbyshire married Sarah Marshall with whom he had a son and three daughters. Darbyshire was an amateur actor and a friend of many actors, in particular Charles Calvert and Henry Irving. He continued to be a member of the Society of Friends. He became a fellow of the Institute of British Architects in 1870 and was its vice-president from 1902 to 1905. He was president of the Manchester Society of Architects from 1901 to 1903. He collected books on heraldry and these are now in the John Rylands Library, Manchester.

Alfred Darbyshire lectured to many societies. He was a member of the Manchester Academy of Fine Arts (1867), Manchester Arts Club (1870) and the Brasenose Club. He was a council member of the Lancashire and Cheshire Antiquarian Society and was a founder member of the Manchester Numismatic Society and served as Treasurer from 1866 to 1868 then Secretary from 1868 to 1869. He was cousin to the American industrialists and philanthropists William Poole Bancroft and Samuel Bancroft, the latter of whom corresponded extensively with Darbyshire about artwork.

Professional and academic associations
Preceded by	President of the Manchester Society of Architects; 1901–03	Succeeded by
Preceded by David Thornbury Batty	Secretary of the Manchester Numismatic Society; 1868–69	Succeeded by Rev. John Smith Doxey
Preceded by Alfred Pickard	Treasurer of the Manchester Numismatic Society; 1866–68	Succeeded by Maurice Delmard

== Bibliography ==
- Susan W Thomson, Manchester's Victorian Art Scene And Its Unrecognised Artists, Manchester Art Press, Warrington, 2007. ISBN 978-0-9554619-0-3. Chapter 10, Alfred Darbyshire 1839–1908 – Architect, Theatrical Designer and Landscape Painter, pp 110–119.
- Alfred Darbyshire, "An architect's experiences: professional, artistic, and theatrical" (1897) – autobiography

== External Resources ==
- Alfred Darbyshire Papers, University of Manchester Library.
