= Charles Galloway =

Charles Galloway may refer to:

- Charles Betts Galloway (1849–1909), American bishop of the Methodist Episcopal Church, South
- Charles Mills Galloway (1875–1954), general counsel to the Controller General of the United States
- Charles Henry Galloway (1871–1931), St. Louis organist, choral conductor, educator, and composer
