= King's Guide =

King's Guide may refer to:

- King's Guide, an undocumented name for Queen's Guide, the highest award for members of Girlguiding.
- King's Guide to the Sands, sand pilot over Morecambe Bay, England
