= Galloway's Society for the Blind =

UK sight loss support charity

- Type: Charity
- Industry: Supporting people with visual impairment
- Founded: 1867
- Headquarters: Lancashire, England
- Key people: Simon Booth, Chairman; Iain Pearson, Chief Executive Officer
- Revenue: 840,030 pound sterling (2021)
- Number of employees: 46 (2021)
- Website: www.galloways.org.uk

Galloway's Society for the Blind, also known as Galloways, is a charity based in Lancashire, England, which supports people with sight loss. It is one of Lancashire's oldest charities, established in 1867 following a public meeting in the Corn Exchange, Preston. It was originally the Preston Industrial Institute for the Blind, then the Institute for Blind Welfare and until 2000 the Preston and North Lancashire Blind Welfare Society. It is now named after William Wilding Galloway, a cotton merchant from Preston who left £40,000 to local charities including £10,000 to the society when he died in 1936. The Society renamed itself in July 2000, to avoid its cumbersome previous name which was commonly abbreviated to the ambiguous "The Blind Society" and to honour its greatest benefactor.

The charity now provides many services to over 7000 blind and visually impaired people across the county from its headquarters in Penwortham near Preston and its offices in Chorley, Morecambe and Southport. The charity has developed an extensive programme of adult education and works in partnership with Lancashire College, The Adult College, Lancaster, and Lancashire County Council.

The provision of Talking Newspapers and Magazines is another one of its services producing over 3500 USB memory sticks and CDs each week. Current titles include Lancashire Evening Post, Ormskirk Advertiser, Lancaster Guardian & Morecambe Visitor, Longridge News, Garstang Courier, Farmers Guardian, Methodist Recorder, The Catholic Voice, Salvation Army War Cry, and Asian Awaz in Urdu.

The charity provides Blind Awareness training to local organisations and undertakes Braille and CD transcription services.

Galloways operates four Sight Advice Centres across Lancashire at Chorley, Preston, Southport and Morecambe from where a range of specialist equipment is available.

The Society relies on legacies and donations to fund its activities and needs to raise over £1 million each year. A regular fund-raising event is the annual walk across Morecambe Bay, which in 2017 had to be cancelled twice because Queen's Guide to the Sands Cedric Robinson could not find a safe route because of high water levels.

The social enterprise cafe "Brew Me Sunshine" in Morecambe, operated in association with Galloways, won the 2021 award for "Work and Training Social Enterprise of the Year" from Selnet, the Social Enterprise Lancashire Network. Its name derives from the Morecambe and Wise song "Bring Me Sunshine".
