= Cross Bay Walk =

Historic hiking route in Northwest England

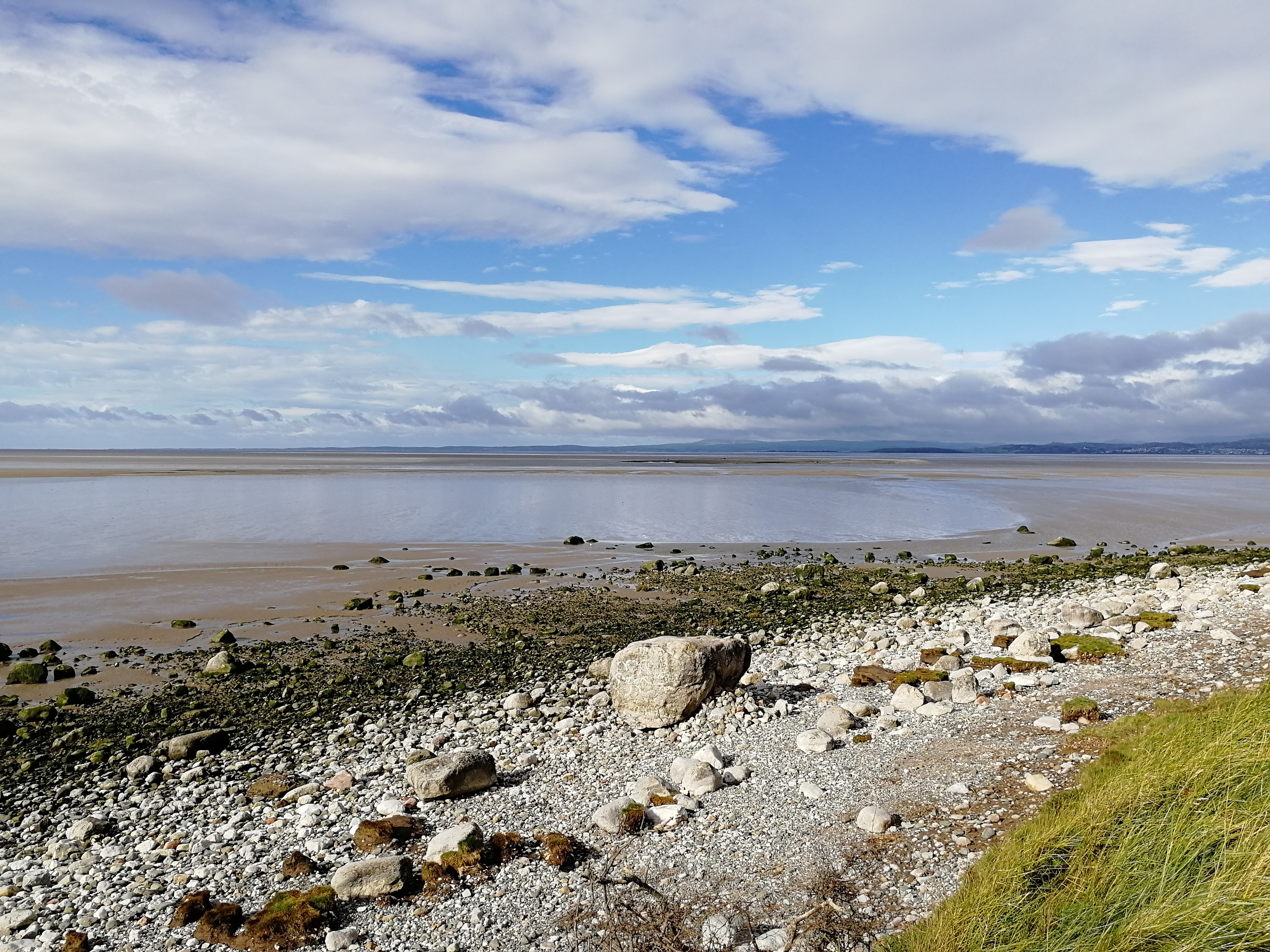
- View from Lancashire side of the Cross Bay Walk, overlooking Morecambe Bay
- Location: North West England
- Designation: Public Byway
- Use: Hiking

The Cross Bay Walk is a historical hiking route in Northwest England that crosses Morecambe Bay. It traditionally connected Hest Bank, Lancashire with Kents Bank, Cumbria. The exact route of the walk varies depending upon local conditions, but is usually between 6 and 8 mi (9.7 and 12.9 km) in length.

== History and guides ==
Alternative ends of the walk on a map of the Bay

A route across Morecambe Bay has existed for centuries, with passage by foot and even, at least until the local railway opened in 1857, mail coaches. Due to the hazardous nature of the bay, particularly its areas of quick sand and unpredictable water channels, guides have assisted travellers throughout history. Prior to the dissolution of the monasteries, monks of Furness at Cartmel Priory provided guides for travellers across Morecambe Bay. After the dissolution, the Duchy of Lancaster assumed responsibility for appointing the guides, with the first appointment made in 1538. The first two appointments were made by letters patent, with subsequent appointments made by the Chancellor of the Duchy of Lancaster. In 2012, the duty to appoint the Queen's Guide to the Sands was transferred to the Guide Over Sands Trust, whose trustees include local aristocrat Lord Cavendish.

== Route ==
The exact route of the crossing has always varied depending upon local conditions, such as tidal conditions and the location of the sand flats that make up the route. The walk originally connected Hest Bank in Lancashire with Kents Bank in Cumbria. More recently, the route has instead crossed Morecambe Bay between Arnside, Cumbria and Kents Bank due to safety concerns.

=== Public Right of Way ===
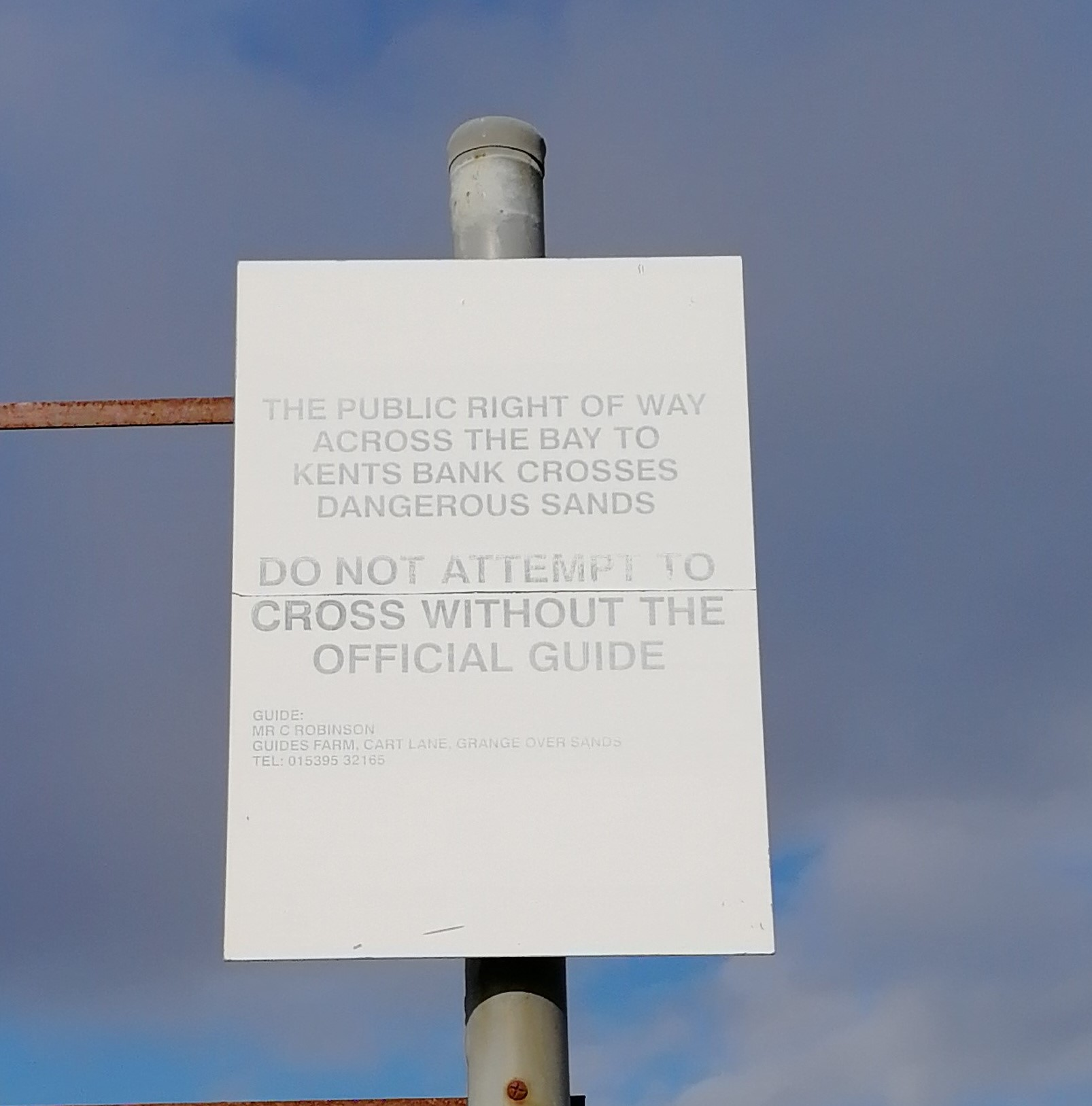
Cross Bay public byway warning sign.

A public byway open to all traffic exists across Morecambe Bay, ensuring permanent public access to the route. However, the route of public right of way, which connects Hest Bank and Kents Bank, should not be taken as the exact crossing route. Indeed, the Queen's Guide to the Sands of the time, Cedric Robinson MBE, described the notion of a designated public right of way as "foolhardy" and stated that it was "impossible to draw the path on the map because it would be obsolete from day one".

The Cross bay working group, made up of Lancaster City Council, South Lakeland District Council, HM Coastguard, Lancashire Constabulary, Lancashire Fire and Rescue Service and Walk Guides, strongly advises that crossings should only be undertaken by well organised groups. Current signage located at the Hest Bank start of the public byway, warns hikers to only cross the bay with the official guide.

== Charity events and culture ==
Taking part in an organised Cross Bay Walk is a popular charity fund raising event, with frequent events raising thousands of pounds for local charities. Such events have always risked cancellation if the weather in the preceding days leads to unsafe conditions, and in 2020 events were cancelled because of the COVID-19 pandemic.

In 2021, guided crossings by 8,365 walkers, 860 runners and 61 horses raised over £300,000 for 35 charities. This included the first recorded naturist walk, in which about 60 participants disrobed half a mile offshore until within half a mile of the far shore.
