= Thomas William Kirkwood =

Scottish polo player

Thomas William Kirkwood, OBE (1884–1971) was a Scottish champion polo player. He competed in the 1924 International Polo Cup.

== Biography ==
Kirkwood was born 17 February 1884, the younger of the two sons of Col. James Nicholson Sodon Kirkwood (1846–1926) and Minnie Charlotte Fergusson (d. 1924), daughter of Major Home Fergusson of The Park, Elie, Fife. The family lived at Woodbrook, County Roscommon. Kirkwood was educated at Blairlodge School and the Royal Military College, Sandhurst, where he was a member of the 1901 cricket team.

He was commissioned a second lieutenant in the Indian army on 21 January 1903, and attached to the 17th Bengal Lancers. Gifted in languages, Kirkwood was sent to Moscow (from 1905) and St Petersburg to study Russian, and in 1919 he commanded an officers’ training camp at Omsk. He later served as an intelligence officer in Japan and was awarded the Order of the Rising Sun and appointed and Officer of the Order of the British Empire (OBE) in 1919.

Kirkwood retired with the rank of major and returned to Ireland, where he entered the Jameson distillery, where his father-in-law, Andrew Jameson, was chairman and managing director.

He regularly played polo wherever he stayed, playing on the winning teams in the Indian cavalry tournament (c.1907) and the British cavalry inter-regimental tournament (1920). After his return to Ireland, he continued to play polo and became treasurer and president of the All Ireland Polo Association and the Irish representative to the Hurlingham Polo Association, the international polo association. In 1924 he competed for the British Isles against the USA in the Westchester cup matches and he also played for Ireland on several occasions. However, his greatest contribution to polo was undoubtedly his tireless efforts to keep the game alive in Ireland after the second world war.

Kirkwood married on 4 May 1910 Harriet Jameson (1880–1953), daughter of Irish politician and businessman Andrew Jameson. She was a celebrated artist, known as Harriet Kirkwood. They lived at Collinstown Park, Clondalkin, Dublin.

He died 22 December 1971 in Dublin.
