= Denis Galloway =

British ethnographer and photographer

William Albert Denis Galloway (5 March 1878 – 7 May 1957) was a Scottish ethnographic artist and photographer. The elder son of Sir William Galloway (1840–1927), Mining Professor at University College of Wales in Cardiff, and Christiana Maud Mary Gordon (1853–1880). His younger brother was Christian Francis John Galloway (1880–1969). Galloway was a renowned ethnographic artist and photographer who travelled extensively in Europe, whilst living firstly in Zeeland and later in Romania, recording the customs and costumes of the local people, from about 1914 until he returned to England in 1950.

== Early years ==
Galloway was born in Cardiff, where his father was a mining engineer. He was educated at home with his brother and later attained his BSc in Mining Engineering at the University of Wales.

Galloway joined the Royal Monmouthshire Royal Engineers, being appointed a 2nd Lieutenant on 10 March 1897, a Lieutenant on 7 December 1898, a Captain on 6 June 1903. He then resigned his commission on 30 April 1907. In 1901 his occupation was Artist Lieutenant in the Royal Monmouthshire Royal Engineers.

In 1904, at the age of 26, Galloway joined the Slade School of Fine Arts in London.

== Life in Europe ==
In 1914 Galloway settled in Westkapelle, Netherlands. While living there, he joined Jan Toorop's artist group in Domburg. He spent the next ten years painting, etching, sketching and photographing the village, the dike, the people and their traditional way of life. Following the destruction of the area in the bombing of October 1944, Galloway's work became an invaluable record of life in the pre-war era, and, as such, has been kept by the Polderhuis (Dyke and Polder War Museum of Westkapelle). Examples of Galloway's work are also held in the Royal Archives of Queen Juliana of the Netherlands.

The Wooden church in Stana, as photographed by Denis Galloway in 1926. Kept in a collection by the Ethnographic Museum of Transylvania.

Between 1926 and 1950, Galloway lived mainly in the town of Cluj, Romania. He worked for the Ethnographic Museum of Transylvania in Cluj between 1927 and 1929, spending periods of 5 to 6 months in different ethnographic areas of Transylvania. He painted watercolours of traditional rural holidays, paying particular attention to the finer details of traditional folk costumes. He collected ethnic objects and took photographs in the Kalotaszeg region, in Piladureni, Hațeg and in the Banat region. which were donated to the museum in 1927.

Between 1930 and 1938, Galloway's connections with the Museum loosened, but there are a large number of his negatives from that time taken in the Nasaud county, and in the Tara Barsei, Osa and Bucovina regions which, in 1950 at the age of 72, Galloway donated to the Ethnographic Museum for their archives. They now hold about 450 negatives of his taken in the Netherlands, Germany, Poland and the Czech Republic, 647 negatives of pictures taken in Romania, and 27 autochrome glass plaques.

Exhibitions of his artwork and photography are still being displayed, for example in Erdelyt Museum in July 2008 and at Polderhuis, Westkapelle from 2008 to mid 2009.

== Camera and pictures ==
Galloway used a Goertz camera on 8x11cm, 9x12cm and later 13x18cm glass plaques.

Galloway's pictures are generally characterised by a harmony of composition and aesthetics. He aimed to produce a faithful documentation of the finest details, as can be seen in his paintings displayed at Westkapelle.

Galloway's photographs fall mainly into three categories:

1. Pictures taken under the direction of ethnographical professor Romulus Vuia. These had a clear "ethnographic importance", registering information related to dwellings, households, specific activities, clothes and customs. These were also taken in both geographically and ethnically diverse communities (Romanian, Hungarian, Saxon and Slavic), with distinctive historical statuses. His pictures kept a colourful and detailed image of traditional Transylvanian rural life in the years 1920–1930.
2. Pictures based on his own ideas, the common element in this group is aesthesis. These landscapes and snapshots, with their blurred characters immortalize ordinary people through skilfully captured aesthetic moments.
3. Pictures made for the village people, his models, are the most numerous. Here Galloway's negatives became a means of bonding, a way of strengthening his position within the community.

== Final years ==
In 1950, Galloway returned to Britain and settled in London with his brother, Christian. He donated his Dutch art to the Museum at Westkapelle, and his Transylvanian negatives to the Ethnographic Museum of Transylvania.

In 1953, Galloway joined the Folk-Lore Society and in his will he bequeathed his remaining collection of ethnographic photographs to the Folk-Lore Society at University College, London.

Denis Galloway died, aged 79, at St Mary's Hospital, Paddington, London.

== Bibliography ==
- Dingemanse-Dieleman, Ans. & Hengst, Daan "Schetsplezier : Denis Galloway (1878-1957): schilder, etser, tekenaar, fotograaf". Westkapelle: Kijk-en Oorlogsmuseum Polderhuis, 2009 ISBN 978-9-07921-003-9
- Napoca, 2008TOTSZEGI Tekla – Traditional Village Viewed by Denis Galloway, Ed. Argonaut, Cluj. The Ethnographical Museum of Transylvania publication
- "The Compact Edition of the Dictionary of National Biography" Vol. II, Oxford University Press 1975 ISBN 0-19-865102-3. Sir William Galloway (1840–1927)
