= Galloway (disambiguation) =

Galloway is a region of Scotland.

Galloway may also refer to:

- Galloway (surname), surname

== Places ==
=== United States ===
- Galloway, Michigan, an unincorporated community
- Galloway, Springfield, Missouri, a neighborhood
- Galloway, Ohio, an unincorporated community
- Galloway, Texas, an unincorporated community
- Galloway, West Virginia, an unincorporated community
- Galloway, Wisconsin, an unincorporated community
- Galloway Road, Miami, Florida
- Galloway Township, New Jersey

=== Elsewhere ===
- Galloway, Alberta, Canada
- Galloway, New Zealand
- Galloway Hills, Scotland

== Animals ==
- Galloway cattle
  - Belted Galloway, a heritage beef breed of cattle
- Galloway pony, an extinct horse breed

== Dioceses ==
- Diocese of Galloway
- Roman Catholic Diocese of Galloway

== Other uses ==
- Galloway (car), made in Scotland between 1920 and 1928
- Galloway (UK Parliament constituency), a former constituency
- Dr. Ruth Galloway, a fictional forensic anthropologist and the protagonist of Elly Griffiths' novels
- Galloway tube, a component of certain designs of steam boiler
- Galloway's Society for the Blind, an English charity
- The Galloway School, Atlanta, Georgia, USA
- W & J Galloway & Sons, a former British engineering company
- Galloways Bakers, chain of pie shops in NW England

== See also ==
- Galway, a city in Ireland
