= T. Lindsay Galloway =

British engineer (1854–1921)

- Born: 1854; Paisley, Renfrewshire, Scotland
- Died: 22 September 1921 (aged 66–67); Campbeltown, Kintyre, Scotland
- Other names: Galloway, Thomas Lindsay
- Occupation: British engineer

Thomas Lindsay Galloway MA, FRSE. FGS, AMInst, MInstME (1854 – 22 September 1921). He was a civil and mining engineer, the coal master of Argyll Colliery, Campbeltown, Kintyre, and the author of several papers, lectures, designs and books.

== Life ==
Thomas was born in Paisley, Renfrewshire; he was the youngest son of William Galloway (1799–1854), a shawl manufacturer and coal master of Paisley and Margaret Lindsay (1818–1902). He was educated at Glasgow University where he studied under Lord Kelvin and was selected by him to travel to the sea off of Brazil to carry out the 'piano wire method' of deep sea soundings. The measuring equipment used by him is kept in the 'Kelvin Room' of the Royal Society of Edinburgh.

On his return from Brazil he concentrated on his studies of mining becoming a mining manager in East Scotland on 10 July 1876, and a member of the North of England Institute of Mining Engineers (NEIMME) on 2 Sept 1876, when he was aged 31, at the Argyll Colliery, Campbeltown, Kintyre.

He was also elected a Fellow of the Kintyre Archaeological Society in 1876, an interest he later shared with his wife. H was also a founder member and elected Vice Chairman at the inaugural meeting of the Kintyre Scientific Association on 24 October 1890.

While in Kintyre he became involved as chief engineer for the Campbeltown and Machrihanish Light Railway which served his colliery.

He died on 22 September 1921 at Kilchrist, Campbeltown, Kintyre. His obituary was placed in the Proceedings of the Royal Society of Edinburgh, and The Geological Society of 1922.

== Literary career and inventions ==
In 1878, Galloway wrote 'On the Present Condition of Mining in Some of the Principal Coal Producing Districts of the Continent'. That same year he also presented a paper, with C.Z. Bunning, entitled 'A Description of an Instrument for Levelling Underground' to the NEIMME. His mining surveys of 1881 are kept by the NEIMME.

In 1902 he read a paper entitled 'The Campbeltown Colliery and Light Railway' to the Glasgow Association of Students of the Institution of Civil Engineers, and his notes were reported in the 'Transactions of the Institution of Mining Engineers'.

In 1903 he read before the Glasgow University Engineering Society papers describing various methods of supplying power to mines, and indicating why different methods have found suitable spheres of application. In 1905 he informed the Institution of Mining Engineers that he had recently installed an electric plant at Campbeltown colliery.

His papers on 'Experiments with two electrically driven pumps' were discussed by the Institution of Mining Engineers at Kilmarnock on 8 August 1908.

In 1918 Galloway read a paper to the Institution of Mining Engineers entitled 'A method of determining the magnetic meridian as a basis for mining surveys'. He had also invented a portable mining magnetometer, to assist in surveys. This was described in 'The Mining Magazine' of 1920, the 'Engineering and Mining Journal' and 'Nature'.

In a paper of 1919 he drew attention to the advantage of using a theodolite and this was reported in 'Transactions of the Institution of Mining Engineers'. He wrote several papers which were referred to in 'The Mining Engineer'.

== Family ==
Galloway's brothers, Sir William Galloway and Robert Lindsay Galloway were also mining engineers. Thomas Lindsay Galloway married Margaret Maria Christina MacNab, daughter of Duncan MacNab and Margaret McCullock of Kintyre, and widow of Cyril Leslie Johnson, in Paddington, London 1902. She had a son by her previous marriage.

== Bibliography ==
- Galloway T. Lindsay. 'The Campbeltown Colliery and Light Railway' Aird & Coghill, Glasgow. 1902

== Honours ==
- Fellow of the Royal Society of Edinburgh
- Fellow of the Geological Society 1876
