= Pat Galloway =

American engineer (born 1957)

Patricia D. Galloway (1957 – September 26, 2024) was an American engineer. She received a bachelor's degree in civil engineering from Purdue University in 1978, an MBA from the New York Institute of Technology, and a Ph.D. from Kochi University of Technology in 2005. She was a PE (Professional Engineer).

== Career ==
Galloway was the CEO of Nielsen-Wurster Group. In 2013, she created a proposal for engineering education reform for the American Society of Civil Engineers that has been hailed as "groundbreaking" by the president of the Georgia Institute of Technology, G. Wayne Clough. Galloway served on the US National Science Board from 2006 to 2012, was inducted into the National Academy of Construction, and was the first female president of ASCE (American Society of Civil Engineers) from 2003 to 2004.
