= Manchester Society of Architects =

Professional society for architects in Manchester, England

- Abbreviation: MSA
- Named after: Manchester
- Formation: 1865
- Founded at: Manchester, England
- Type: Nonprofit
- Legal status: Charitable organization
- Purpose: Professional society for architects
- Location: Manchester, United Kingdom
- Region served: Greater Manchester
- Services: Membership organization; library
- Methods: Awards; events; lectures
- Field: Architecture
- Official language: English
- President: Jenny Etheridge
- Vice President: Paul Iddon
- Treasurer: Simina Ionescu
- Secretary: Shadath Chowdhury
- Main organ: MSA Council
- Affiliations: Royal Institute of British Architects
- Funding: Subscription fees
- Website: manchestersocietyofarchitects.com

The Manchester Society of Architects (MSA) is a professional society for architects in the Greater Manchester area, England.

The society is led by an elected President. The society organises activities such as lecture series. It also presents awards, including exhibitions, in locations such as the Albert Hall, Manchester.

== Archives ==
The University of Manchester Library holds a Manchester Society of Architects Archive with material dating from 1859–1992. The Manchester Society of Architects Library holds important and rare books about the history of architecture.

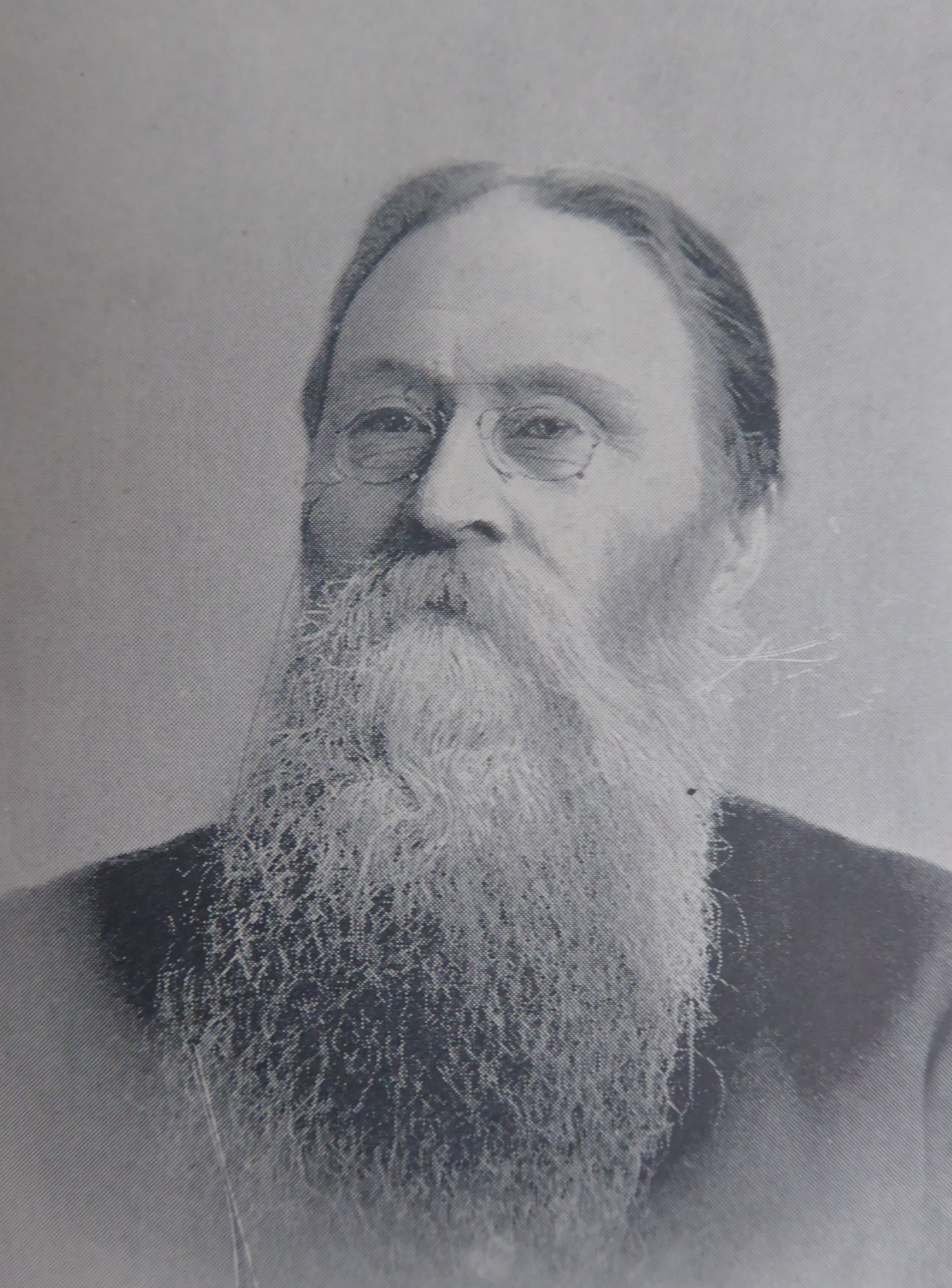
Alfred Darbyshire, President of the Manchester Society of Architects during 1901–03

== Selected presidents ==
- Alfred Darbyshire
- Harry S. Fairhurst
- Richard Knill Freeman
- Arthur John Hope
- Leonard Cecil Howitt
- Richard Lane
- George Tunstal Redmayne
- Edgar Wood

== See also ==
- Royal Institute of British Architects (RIBA)
