= Gerald Edward Galloway Jr. =

American civil engineer and U.S. Army brigadier general

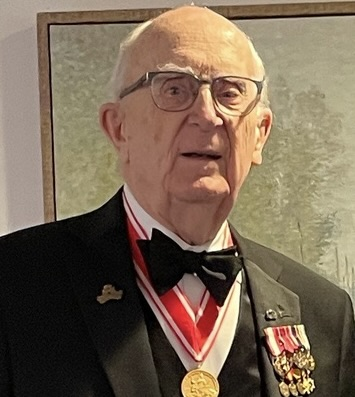
Gerald E. Galloway, 2025

Gerald Edward Galloway Jr. (born November 27, 1935) is an American civil engineer, public administrator, and retired brigadier general in the United States Army. He is professor emeritus and former Glenn L. Martin Institute Professor of Engineering in the Department of Civil and Environmental Engineering at the University of Maryland, College Park. He was the ninth Dean of the Academic Board at the United States Military Academy at West Point and led the federal review of the Great Flood of 1993, producing Sharing the Challenge: Floodplain Management into the 21st Century (the "Galloway Report").

== Early life and education ==
Galloway was born in Mobile, Alabama. He graduated from the United States Military Academy in 1957, and in that same year married Diane Messinger, in Honolulu, Hawaii. They had six children. He earned graduate degrees from Princeton University (M.S.E., 1962), the United States Army Command and General Staff College (M.M.A.S., 1968), Pennsylvania State University (M.P.A., 1974), and the University of North Carolina (Ph.D., 1979).

== Military career ==
A career engineer officer in the United States Army Corps of Engineers, Galloway commanded the Vicksburg District from 1977 to 1979. In 1990 he was promoted to brigadier general and appointed the ninth Dean of the Academic Board (chief academic officer) at West Point, serving until 1995.

== Government and public service ==
In 1988 he was nominated and later confirmed to the seven-member Mississippi River Commission, serving until 1995. Following the 1993 Midwest floods, the White House appointed him to lead the Interagency Floodplain Management Review Committee, which produced Sharing the Challenge: Floodplain Management into the 21st Century and recommended a comprehensive, risk-based approach to U.S. floodplain management. Contemporary reporting highlighted the report’s “innovative” direction and quoted Galloway on the limits of levee-only strategies and the need for combined approaches.

In 1998 he became Secretary of the U.S. Section of the International Joint Commission.

== Academic career ==
After military service, Galloway joined the University of Maryland faculty as the Glenn L. Martin Institute Professor of Engineering, focusing on water resources policy, disaster resilience, and infrastructure.

== Honors ==
Galloway was elected to the National Academy of Engineering in 2004 "for distinguished leadership in the management of sustainable water resources and education in environmental engineering." He is also a member of the National Academy of Construction. Engineering News-Record named him a **Top 25 Newsmaker of 2018** and profiled his contributions to national urban-flooding studies.

== Selected works ==
- Interagency Floodplain Management Review Committee (1994). Sharing the Challenge: Floodplain Management into the 21st Century. Washington, D.C.: U.S. Government Printing Office.
- Winters, Harold A.; Galloway, Gerald E. Jr.; Reynolds, William J.; Rhyne, David W. (2001). Battling the Elements: Weather and Terrain in the Conduct of War. Johns Hopkins University Press.
