= Alice Lawrenson =

Irish gardener

- Born: Alice Louisa Jane Bland; 2 October 1841; County Antrim, Northern Ireland
- Died: 14 March 1900 (aged 58); Ballybrack, County Dublin
- Other name: 'St Brigid'
- Occupation: Gardener
- Spouse: Edward Lawrenson
- Children: 1

Alice Louisa Lawrenson (2 October 1841– 14 March 1900), often writing as St. Brigid, was an Irish botanical writer and gardener.

== Biography ==
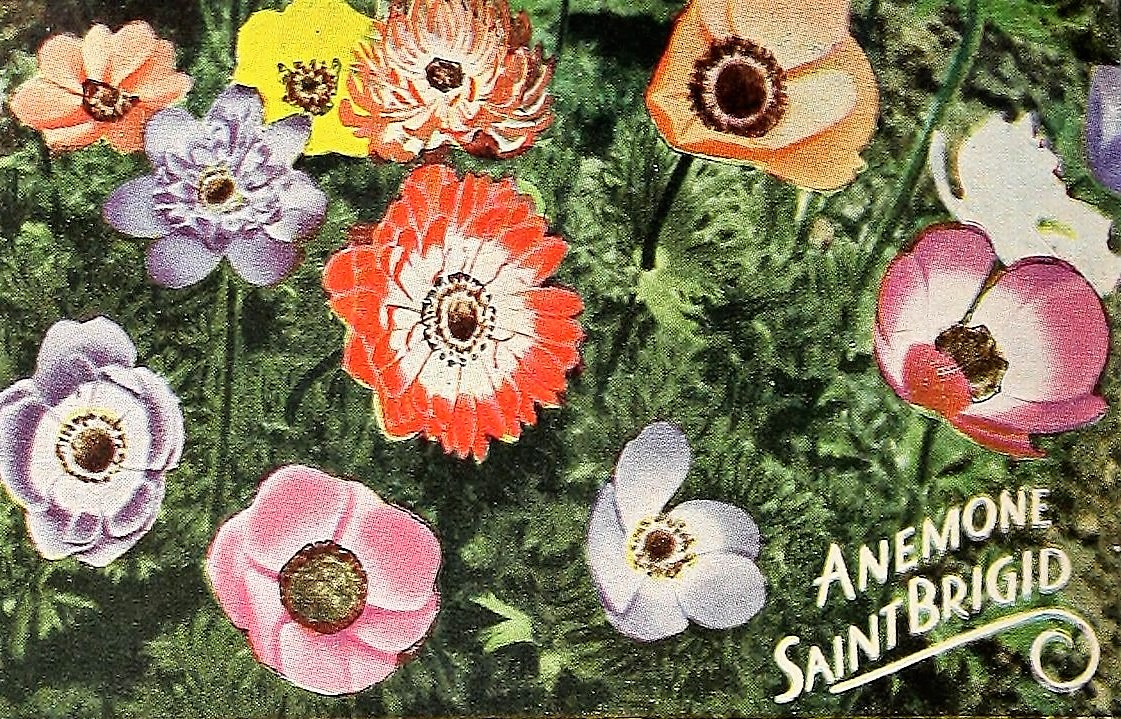
St Brigid's Anemone

Alice Lawrenson was born Alice Louisa Jane Bland, to Reverend Robert Wintringham Bland and Alicia Evans, on 2 October 1841. Her father was a Justice of the Peace and they lived in Abbeyville, County Antrim.

Lawrenson was a gardener who wrote a column as well as other articles for various gardening periodicals including Gardener's Chronicle under the pseudonym of St Brigid. She was a friend of Frederick William Burbidge. who named a species of white rose after her. The anemone coronaria St. Brigid was also named after her. She was also responsible for introducing a number of flowers to Ireland including a version of daffodil called Lucifer.

She had lived in Sutton House on Howth Head in northern County Dublin, and died while living in Salerno, Killiney in southern County Dublin on 14 March 1900. She married Edward Lawrenson on 26 October 1865. He died 15 December 1886. She had at least one son, the artist Edward Louis Lawrenson (1868–1940).
