= Alston Hall =

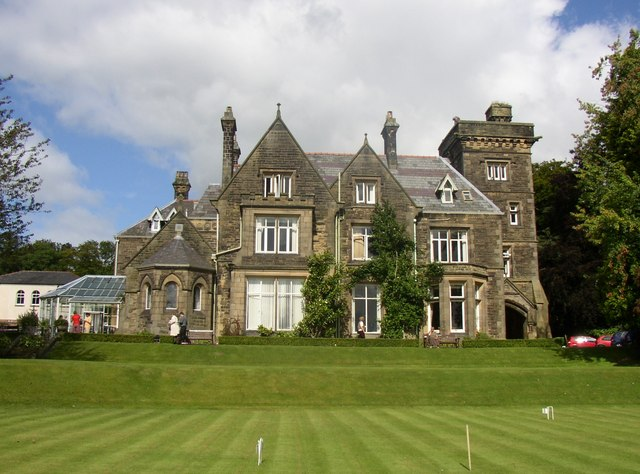

- Location within the Borough of Ribble Valley

General information
- Type: Country house
- Architectural style: Victorian gothic
- Location: Longridge, Lancashire, England
- Coordinates: 53.8000°N 2.5960°W
- Completed: c.1876
- Owner: Lancashire County Council

Design and construction
- Architect: Alfred Darbyshire

Website
- www.alstonhall.com

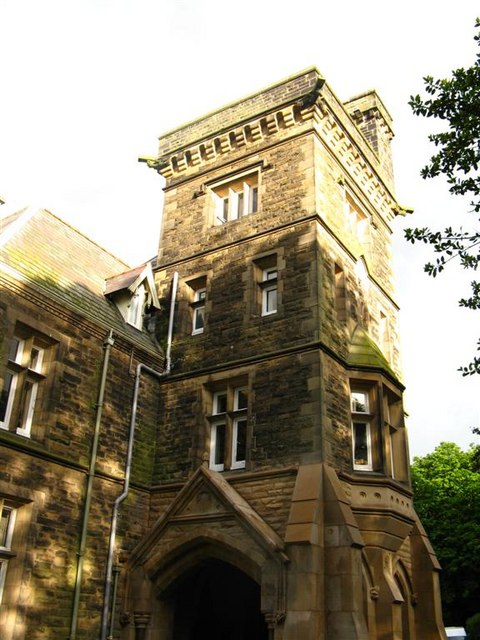
The entrance tower of Alston Hall

Alston Hall is a 19th-century Victorian gothic style country mansion located in Longridge (near Preston) in Lancashire, England. It is not to be confused with the 15th-century Alston Old Hall nearby.

== History ==
Alston Hall, designed by the architect Alfred Darbyshire, was built c.1876 for John Mercer, a Newton-le-Willows colliery owner. It passed down to his grand-daughter, who was a nun, and was then sold to the Eccles cotton manufacturing family who sold it in turn to William Birtwistle, another wealthy cotton industrialist. In 1949 the Birtwistles sold most of the land to the Church Commissioners and the hall itself, together with the remaining three acres of land, to Preston Borough Council as a Day Continuation College. In 1974 it was purchased by Lancashire County Council and converted to a residential training centre.

Alston Hall is no longer owned and operated by Lancashire Adult Learning. It is now owned by a private individual as a family home.

The hall is recorded in the National Heritage List for England as a designated Grade II listed building.

== See also ==
- Listed buildings in Longridge
- Lancashire College
- The Adult College, Lancaster
