= William Galloway (mining engineer) =

Scottish mining engineer, professor and industrialist

Sir William Galloway (12 February 1840 – 2 November 1927) was a Scottish mining engineer, professor and industrialist.

He spent much of his life as an Inspector of Mines, before being offered the post of Professor of Mining at the University College of Wales. His life was spent improving the lot of miners and working to determine the causes of explosions and accidents in mines and finding ways of preventing them or alleviating their impact. His efforts were recognised in 1924, when, at the age of 83, he was knighted.

== Early life and education ==
William Galloway was born in Paisley, the eldest son of William Galloway (1799–1854), JP, a Paisley shawl manufacturer and coal and iron master from Paisley in Scotland and his second wife, Margaret Lindsay (1818–1902), daughter of Thomas Lindsay, a brewer from Glasgow.

Galloway attended a private school in Scotland before going to Germany where he studied at the University of Giessen and the Technische Universitat Bergakademie Freiberg. He also studied at University College, London. He was proficient in six languages, and in later life received an honorary degree D.Sc. from the University of Wales, where he was employed as a Professor of Mining.

== Mining career ==
In 1861, at the age of 21, Galloway was employed as the colliery manager at Cambusnethan, in Lanarkshire, Scotland. He held a first class certificate under the Coal Mines Regulation Act, 1872 after being examined in June 1873 and June 1879. As a mining inspector in Scotland he investigated the causes of between 60 and 80 accidents before moving to Wales.

On 3 December 1875 at Old Pit in New Tredegar, after a minor explosion the previous day where no gas had been detected, the men entered the pit against orders and at 8:00 a.m. there was a tremendous explosion killing 20 men and boys instantly and two more died from their injuries. Three days later, on 6 December 1875, at Llan Colliery, Pentyrch, another explosion killed 12 men and boys. Galloway as mining inspector reported his findings at the inquest. He found that both the timbers and miners furthest from the point of ignition were the most severely burned, reinforcing his theory that in dry mines coal dust spreads the explosion. His conclusions were accepted by the coroner and 'watering' and spreading stone dust were introduced as a result of his observations at Llan. In 1876 he delivered lectures in Paris, France with Jules Pierre Callon and Sir Clement le Neve Foster, which have been translated and printed in 'Lectures on mining delivered at the School of Mines, Paris' By the start of the 1880s his theories on the dangers of coal dust were being taken more seriously and have been discussed in many books and articles from then to the present day.

In 1884, he was called on to give evidence at the Penycraig disaster and his evidence, as printed in the Cardiff Western Mail 1884, is held by the North of England Institute of Mining and Mechanical Engineers NEIMME, along with a course of lectures on mining given by him for the South Wales Institute of Engineers in 1900. On 23 April 1887 he was elected as a member of the NEIMME. and from 1896 to 1903 and 1907 to 1910 he was a council member of the Institute of Mining Engineers for Cardiff. In January 1907 he was called before the Royal Commission on Mines to give evidence with regard to 'watering' the mine floor and its effectiveness, and in 1910 his evidence was given to the Miners' Federation of Great Britain after the Wellington Pit Disaster.

Not all the loss of life in the mines was caused by explosions. Some like the Troehydriw disaster of 1877 and the Townhead disaster of 1913 involved extensive flooding in which some men survived after air and supplies were passed to them through bore holes while they awaited rescue. The rescue took ten days in Troehydriw and the country including Queen Victoria expressed concern for the men and she requested photographic proof of their safe rescue. The survivors at Townhead had to wait for five days before rescue in 1913. Both of these were incidents that William Galloway had to attend as mining inspector.

By 1923, he followed his family tradition by becoming an owner/director of collieries. He became the chairman and a director of the East Kent Colliery Company and director of the Snowdown Colliery.

== Inventions and research ==
In 1870, Galloway began investigations into the cause of explosions in dry mines, and became convinced that the cause was coal dust as well as fire damp. He was called on, as a mining inspector, to investigate the causes of between 60 and 80 explosions in Scottish mines and it became his life's work to find ways to reduce the risk to the lives on miners underground. He carried out tests with safety lamps, finding that the flame was deflected through the gauze when shots were fired, measured the varying size and colour of flame depending on the atmospheric conditions and composition. He wrote papers on his findings and presented them to the Institute of Mining, the Royal Society, the Athenaeum Club, London and anyone else who would listen.

In 1872 he wrote an article together with Robert H. Scott F.R.S., Director of the Meteorological Office entitled 'On the connection between colliery explosions and the weather in 1872' showing there was more likelihood of explosions in dry weather than wet in shallow mines. The article was published by the Royal Meteorological Society in its Quarterly Journal of 1875, Vol. 2, Issue 12, pp 195–205.

He undertook numerous experiments to determine the size of the flame in lamps that determined the percentage of fire damp in the atmosphere, but details that were ridiculed at the time have since been found to be extremely accurate.

Galloway devised an improved walling cradle enabling two teams of workers to operate on different levels at the same time. He also devised a means of substituting the cages with water tanks to remove large quantities of water from flooded mines quickly. They became known as Galloway pneumatic tanks In 1875, he patented the idea of using twin guides or guide ropes for the kibble, allowing two kibbles to be used to sink a shaft. He also devised improved counterbalanced doors to cover the shaft top, speeding up operations and reducing the danger of injury to men, and damage to the shaft. He designed a steel bucket to carry the coal underground with wheels lubricated from hollow axle boxes and buffers, giving a smoother ride and lessening the amount of coal dust dropped on the road, and he also devised an engine small enough to be taken down in a cage and which could run along the tracks and be operated by compressed air, removing the need for pit ponies for hauling coal trucks. He installed a compressed air system using two engines to raise and lower equipment at Llanbradach colliery.

== Later life ==
Being unable to gain promotion in to senior inspector, possibly because he was a Scotsman in Wales, Galloway resigned his post as assistant Inspector of Mines. He became the first Professor of Mining at the University College of Wales in Cardiff. Resigning from there in 1902. He became a consultant engineer and took on work in Britain and abroad, for example, Assam, and the Cape of Good Hope.

On 22 February 1917 he presented a paper to the Commission on Mines at the Houses of Parliament with regard to his findings on the explosive properties of coal dust.

Galloway was knighted in the 1924 Birthday Honours for public services.

Sir William Galloway died 2 November 1927 at his home in Park Place, Cardiff, where he is buried in Cathay Cemetery. His grave is marked by a very distinctive memorial.

== Honours ==
Galloway was awarded an honorary degree, D.Sc from the University College of Wales. He was knighted in the New Year's Honours List of 1924, becoming Sir William Galloway

Galloway was awarded the Shaw Gold Medal by the Royal Society of Arts, a Medal by the Institution of Mining Engineers and a special Gold Medal by the South Wales Institute of Engineers in 1925.

His portrait was presented by the Monmouthshire and South Wales Coalowners Association, and he was also presented with a gold watch.

== Family ==
Galloway's father William married Agnes Muir (1803–1830) by whom he had three children: John Galloway (1825–1899), coal master of Kilmarnock, Ayrshire, and Margaret (born 1827) and William (born 1830) who both died young.

In 1837 William Galloway snr. married Margaret Lindsay (1818–1902) in Paisley and they had six children:

- Margaret Galloway (1838–1912) who married John Corry, son of Robert Corry founder of James P. Corry & Co. shipping company, later the Port Line.
- William Galloway (1840–1927) mining engineer, university professor and inventor;
- Thomas Lindsay Galloway (1842–1850);
- Robert Lindsay Galloway (1844–1908) coal master and author;
- James Jack Galloway (1847–1928) civil engineer and coalmaster;
- Thomas or T. Lindsay Galloway (1854–1921) civil and mining engineer and author.

William Galloway junior married Christiana Maud Mary Gordon (1853–1880) by whom he had four children: Sarah Christiana W Galloway (1877–1878); William Albert Denis Galloway (1878–1957); Christiana Margaret Gordon Galloway (1879–1880) and Christian Francis John Galloway (1880–1960)

He had two daughters by Ada Rose Cliffe (1867–1949): Marjorie Galloway Cliffe (1894–1976) and Gertrude Galloway Cliffe (1896–1957)

His second marriage was to Mary Gwennap Douglas Killick, formerly Wood, who had three children from her former marriage to Richard Killick (1850–1930).

Finally with Charlotte Jane Sparkes (1887–1977), he had two daughters Constance Olivia Galloway (1914–2004) and Ruth Viola Galloway (1919–1991)

== Bibliography ==
- 'The Compact Edition of the Dictionary of National Biography' Vol. II The Oxford University Press 1975
- Creswick William, Galloway William, Hopton William, 'Essays on the prevention of explosions and accidents in Coal Mines, 1874' Kessinger Publishing LLC 2010 ISBN 1-169-02083-6
- 'Proceedings of the Royal Society of London' Vol. 22 Taylor & Francis 1874
- Galloway William 'Course of Lectures on Mining delivered in the lecture theatre of the South Wales Institute of Engineers' Vol. 1–8. The Institute of Engineers 1900
- Callon Jules Pierre, Foster Sir Clement le Neve, Galloway William 'Lectures on mining delivered at the School of Mines, Paris' Dulau 1876
- Galloway William. 'On the influence of coal dust in colliery explosions' No. 3-4. Harrison & Sons
- Galloway William. 'Subsidences caused by workings in mines' South Wales Institute of Miners 1897
- Galloway William. 'Report on the Daranggiri Coalfield, in the Garo Hills, Assam'
- Galloway William. 'Report on the Pittenweem Coalfield' s.n. 1895
- Abel Sir Frederick Augustus. 'Mining Accidents and their prevention' The Scientific Publishing Co. 1889
- Beard James Thom. 'Mine Gases and Explosions': text book for schools and colleges. J. Wiley & Sons 1908
- Bulletin of the American Institute of Mining and Metallurgical Engineers, Issues 7–10 1906
