= The Adult College, Lancaster =

Coordinates: 54.0457°N 2.7957°W

The Adult College
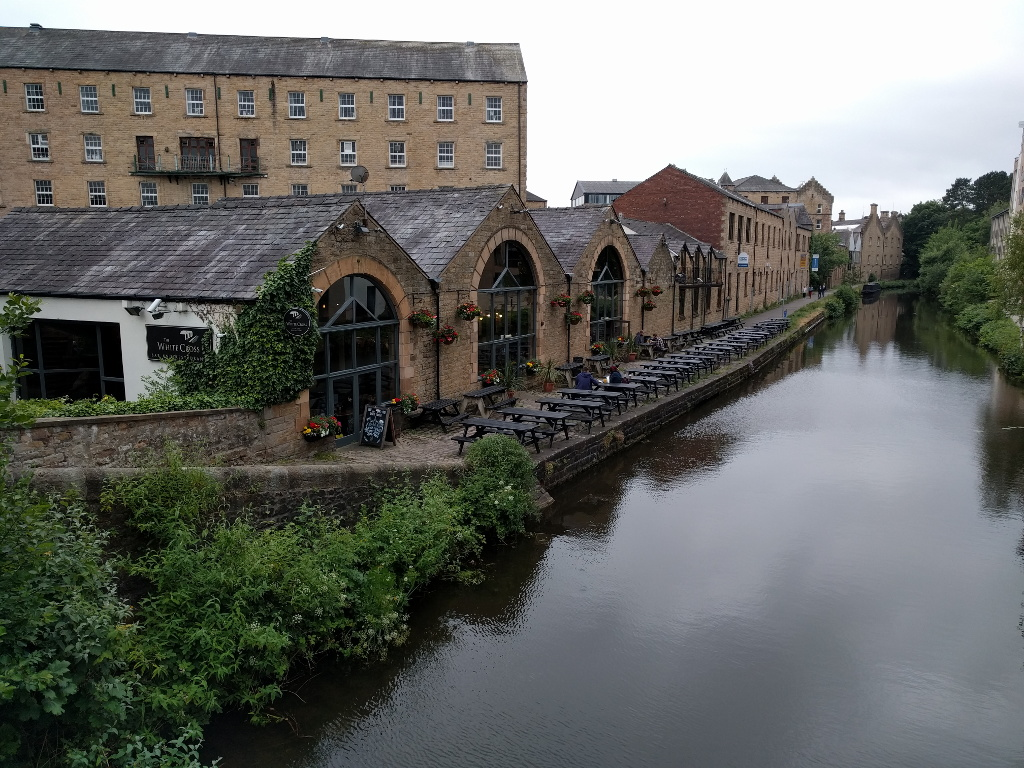
- The college occupied the multi-storey building behind the White Cross public house.
- Type: Adult education
- Established: 1975
- Academic affiliations: Lancashire Adult Learning
- Location: Lancaster, Lancashire, England
- Website: The Adult College

The Adult College was an adult education college located in the centre of Lancaster in Lancashire, England.

The college was established in 1975, and moved to a site on Quarry Road overlooking the Lancaster Canal in 1990. The Adult College was not an independent body, rather it was wholly owned and operated by Lancashire County Council as part of Lancashire Adult Learning.

Courses offered by the college were aimed primarily at adult learners who were returning to education, rather than recent school leavers. Levels of study ranged from basic literacy and numeracy courses to GCSEs and Access courses.

The Adult College site on Quarry Road closed in October 2016. Courses are now offered via Lancashire Adult Learning, and are held in various Lancashire County Council owned buildings.

== See also ==
- Alston Hall
- Lancashire College
