= Robert Galloway (mining engineer) =

Scottish mining engineer and author (1844–1908)

Robert Lindsay Galloway
- Born: 22 February 1844; Paisley, Renfrewshire, Scotland
- Died: 24 February 1908 (aged 64); Bridge of Allan, Stirlingshire, Scotland
- Occupations: Mining Engineer and Author
- Known for: Author of books on History of Coal Mining in Britain

Robert Lindsay Galloway (22 February 1844 – 24 February 1908) was a Scottish mining engineer and author.

== Family ==
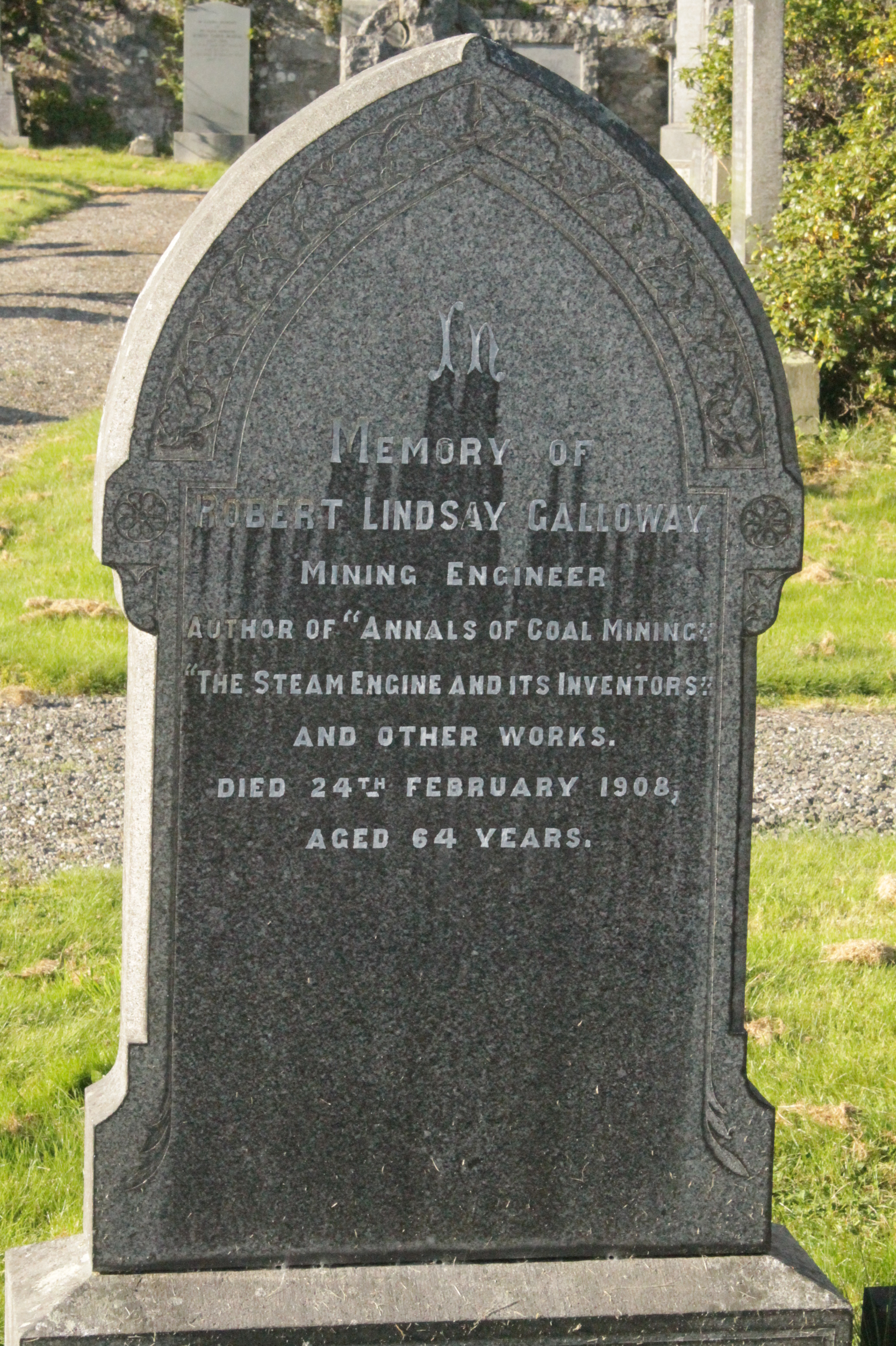
The grave of Robert Lindsay Galloway, Logie Kirk

Galloway was the son of William Galloway (1799–1854), a Paisley shawl manufacturer and coal master, and Margaret Lindsay (1818–1902), daughter of Thomas Lindsay, a Glasgow brewer. Born in Paisley, he was the younger brother of Sir William Galloway, mining engineer and professor of mining at the University College of Wales in Cardiff. He married Elizabeth Baird, daughter of James Baird, a farmer from Sorn in Ayrshire on 14 November 1871. They had two sons, William Galloway born 1872 in Newcastle and James Baird Galloway born in 1874 at Gateshead. His wife and younger son died in 1875 and his son William was brought up by his maternal grandparents in Sorn, and became a farmer before moving to Essex.

His half-brother John Galloway who lived in Ayrshire, and younger brothers, T. Lindsay Galloway and James Jack Galloway of Glasgow, were also coal masters. John's son James William Galloway, coalmaster in Ayrshire, and Sir William's son Christian Francis John Galloway, a mining engineer and author in Cardiff were the only members of the next generation to continue in the industry.

Robert Galloway died in Scotland on 24 February 1908 at Bridge of Allan, in Stirlingshire. He is buried in the churchyard at Logie Kirk north-east of the church.

== Mining career ==
When Galloway was 27 he was a mining engineer and coal master employing five men in 1871 at Sorn in Ayrshire. After he married he moved to County Durham and qualified as a certificated colliery manager and became a member of the North of England Institute of Mining and Mechanical Engineers at Ryton on Tyne on 6 December 1873. While he was a mining engineer and colliery manager in the Newcastle area and in Scotland, he became known as a historian specialising in writing about the mining industry and the steam engine.

== Literary career ==
On 30 April 1879 Galloway presented 'Earliest records connected with the working of coal on the banks of the River Tyne' to a meeting of the Society of Antiquaries of Newcastle upon Tyne. In 1880 his book 'The Steam Engine and its Inventors' was published. Two years later his 'A History of Coal Mining in Great Britain' was printed. Galloway helped organise a mining exhibition between 1–24 September 1885 at Burnbank Drill Halls, Glasgow and he wrote a 'Review of the Progressive Improvements of Mining in Scotland' as an introduction to the exhibition catalogue. In 1906 papers relating to the history of the coal trade and the invention of the steam engine were published.

== Bibliography ==
- Galloway R.L. The Steam Engine and its Inventors Macmillan, 1881
- Galloway Robert L. 'Annals of Coal Mining and the Coal Trade'. Vol I. The Colliery Guardian Company Limited, London 1898, David & Charles (Publishers) Ltd 1971 ISBN 0-7153-4980-5
- Galloway Robert L. 'Annals of Coal Mining and the Coal Trade' Vol II. The Colliery Guardian Company Limited, London 1904, David & Charles (Publishers) Ltd. 1971 ISBN 0-7153-5147-8
- Galloway Robert Lindsay A History of Coal Mining in Great Britain A.M. Kelley 1882, Read Books Design 2010 ISBN 1-4455-5198-5, ISBN 978-1-4455-5198-2.
