= William Wilding Galloway =

English businessman (1854–1936)

William Wilding Galloway (30 March 1854 – 27 September 1936) was an English businessman who made his fortune in the cotton industry. He was President of Horrockses Crewdson and Co., a Preston, Lancashire, firm of cotton manufacturers and pattern makers. When he died he was living at Bilsborrow Hall, near Preston. His father was George Galloway, also of Preston.

In his will, Galloway left an estate of over £570,000 (£48.9 million as of 2023), and gave specific legacies of £10,000 to establish a "William Galloway Employees Benefits fund" for employees of Horrockses and their dependents; £10,000 to the Preston and Lancashire Queen Victoria Royal Infirmary, £10,000 for "a Galloway charity for the poor and needy of Preston", several smaller charitable donations and the residue of his estate after other legacies "for such charitable institutions within five miles of Preston as his trustees may select".

The Galloway's Society for the Blind (formerly the Preston and North Lancashire Blind Welfare Society) received £10,000 from his estate for the purchase of a building, Howick House, which became the "Galloway Home for the Blind" and is still the society's headquarters. The society renamed itself in 2000 to avoid its cumbersome former name and honour its greatest benefactor. Other local institutions which carry his name include the William Wilding Galloway Hall in Preston, the William Wilding Galloway Fund for the Provision of a Church Worker (a charity with the objects: "To engage and employ some suitable person or persons to minister to the needs of poor persons resident in the Borough of Preston", registered charity no. 250914) and the T.S. Galloway base of the Preston Sea Cadets.
