= John Galloway =

John Galloway may refer to:

- John Galloway (American politician) (born 1960), Pennsylvania politician
- John Galloway (Medal of Honor) (1843–1904), veteran of the American Civil War
- John A. Galloway (1928–2025), American endocrinologist
- John James Galloway (1819–1883), Australian politician

== See also ==
- W & J Galloway & Sons, company co-founded by British inventor John Galloway (1804–1894)
- Saladin (barque), British ship sunk in 1844, John Galloway found not guilty of mutiny
- John Marion Galloway House, built for tobacco grower John Marion Galloway (1880–1922)
