= Harriet Kirkwood =

Irish painter (1880–1953)

- Born: Grace Harriet Sara Jameson; 28 September 1880; Sutton, Dublin
- Died: 20 June 1953 (aged 72); Clondalkin, Dublin
- Resting place: Ardcarne church, Boyle, County Roscommon

Grace Harriet Sara Kirkwood (née Jameson; 28 September 1880 – 20 June 1953) was an Irish artist, known for her landscape and still life paintings.

Kirkwood was born in Sutton, Dublin. Her parents were the chairman and managing director of John Jameson & Son Ltd, Andrew Jameson, and Grace Elizabeth Anna Maria (née Burke). She was the middle child of three daughters. Kirkwood studied under Mary Manning, going on to attend Metropolitan School of Art, Dublin from 1908 to 1909. On 4 March 1910, she married Major Thomas William Kirkwood. He was supportive of Kirkwood's artistic pursuits and encouraged her. They lived for a short period in Russia in 1913, where she took lessons in painting from Ilya Mashkov in Moscow. Upon their return to Dublin, she re-registered at the Metropolitan School of Art, and attended the Slade School of Fine Art, London from 1919 to 1920.

Her family, the Jamesons, were good friends and patrons of the Yeats family. John Butler Yeats painted numerous portraits of the Jamesons and he encouraged her in her painting. Kirkwood continued the friendship with the Butlers, and invited a number of the most famous artists of the time to her house in Collinstown Park, Clondalkin. She was close friends with Mainie Jellett and Evie Hone. Following their example, she went to Paris to study under André Lhote. She was one of six artists who studied under Lhote who exhibited at the Contemporary Pictures Gallery at 133 Lower Baggot Street, Dublin.

From 1922, Kirkwood was an active member of the Society of Dublin Painters. The first pictures she exhibited with them were in 1930 with some landscapes at their gallery at 7 St Stephen's Green, Dublin. In 1930 she served as secretary, and in 1936 became president of the Society. In 1938, Seán T. O'Kelly opened a group show at the gallery praising the members for the form they provided and for their independence from the academic tradition. Edward McGuire was exhibited at this show, and he had taken up painting at Kirkwood's suggestion. Kirkwood served as the Society president until 1948. She was seen as a great supporter of artists, and collected Irish art from her contemporaries.

She continued to exhibit with the Society until 1953, and was shown at the Irish Exhibition of Living Art regularly from 1943. In 1944 and 1945 she exhibited with the Water Colour Society of Ireland. The National Gallery of Ireland holds two of her works: Still-life with fruit and flowers (1940) and a portrait of Dr George Furlong. In 1966, her husband donated a watercolour to Trinity College Dublin.

Kirkwood died at her home in Clondalkin on 20 June 1953, with her funeral taking place at Ardcarne church, Boyle, County Roscommon.
