= Michael Galloway =

Michael, Mike or Mick Galloway may refer to:

- Michael Galloway (actor) (1925–2010), American actor
- Michael Galloway (politician) (born 1965), Texas politician
- Mike Galloway (footballer) (1965–2026), Scottish footballer
- Mike Galloway (bowls) (born 1966), New Zealand bowls player
- Mick Galloway (born 1974), English footballer
- Mike Galloway (Shortland Street character), character from the New Zealand soap Shortland Street, played by Oliver Driver
