= Lancashire College =

Coordinates: 53.6554°N 2.6510°W

Lancashire Adult Learning

Location
- Southport Road, Chorley; PR7 1NB

Information
- Department for Education URN: 133102 Tables
- Ofsted: Reports
- Gender: Mixed
- Age: 19 to 99
- Website: www.lal.ac.uk

Lancashire Adult Learning is an adult education college located in Lancashire, England . It is a member of the East Lancashire Learning Group, along with Nelson and Colne College and Accrington and Rossendale College

Courses offered by the college are aimed primarily at adult learners rather than recent school leavers, and include short courses, weekly courses, ESOL programmes and Functional Skills.

== See also ==
- The Adult College, Lancaster
- Alston Hall
