= C. F. J. Galloway =

Mining engineer and military officer (1880–1969)

Christian Francis John Galloway
- Born: 13 May 1880; Llantrissant Dinas, Wales
- Died: 31 August 1969 (aged 89); Hampstead, England
- Other name: Galloway C.F.J
- Occupations: Mining engineer and military officer

Christian Francis John Galloway BSc F.R.G.S., F.R.C.I. (13 May 1880 – 31 August 1969) was of Scottish descent, born at Llantrissant Dinas, Wales, the second son of Sir William Galloway (1840–1927), mining engineer, and Christiana Maud Mary Gordon (1853–1880), and younger brother of William Albert Denis Galloway (1878–1957). He qualified as a mining engineer, and was later employed by the governments of British Columbia and Sarawak in Borneo to survey coal deposits.

He joined the Royal Monmouthshire Royal Engineers in 1897, and served with them in South Africa during the Boer War, in France during the World War I, and later in Mesopotamia and Persia, rising to the rank of Major by 1920.

== Military career ==
On 1 December 1897 Christian Francis John Galloway, aged 17, was appointed 2nd Lieutenant of the Royal Monmouthshire Royal Engineers (Militia)

He was promoted to Lieutenant 14 February 1900 and served with R.M.R.E. in South Africa during the Anglo-Boer War earning the Queen's South Africa Medal with 5 clasps – "Cape Colony", "Orange Free State", "Transvaal", "South Africa 1901" and "South Africa 1902". returning to England in 1902, being promoted to Captain 19 March 1904:

At the start of the First World War he returned to the R.M.R.E. as Temporary Captain 3 September 1914 with No. 4 Siege Co. He was wounded in 1915, and then posted to No. 6 Siege Co. landing in France in May 1916, by which time the preparations for the Battle of the Somme were in full swing. The Company's work consisted in the main of construction of new hutted camps, hospitals and base installations, e.g. ammunition depots. Captain Galloway ran a school for Australian N.C.O's and Sappers and was promoted to Acting Major 17 March 1917. He was sick and evacuated to England in July 1918.

After being discharged from the hospital in autumn 1918, he rejoined at Monmouth and was posted to York as D.O., R.E. (Garrison Engineer). He later served with the R.M.R.E. in Mesopotamia (Iraq) in 1919 and Persia (Iran) in 1920, being promoted to the rank of Major on 1 April 1920.

In addition to his Boer war medals, he also received the 1914–15 Star, the British War Medal, Victory Medal and the General Service Medal with two clasps: Iraq and N.W. Persia.

== Mining career ==
Christian Galloway obtained his BSc in mining engineering at the University of Wales, Cardiff, attaining his Masters Certificate of Competency as a Manager of Mines in 1905, aged 25.

In 1908 he was commissioned by the British Columbian Ministry of Mines, Canada, to carry out coal surveys of the Peace River Valley and surrounding area. He stayed in the country for 5 years living in the backwoods of the area throughout the time travelling by steamer, train, packhorse or on foot, by canvas or log canoe to reach the less accessible areas. He and his companion, Falconer, were, they believed, the first white men to climb the 8,250 ft. mountain near Lake Chilco. They named it Mount Cardiff, after Christian's home town, a name it retains to this day in the Cardiff Mountain Ecological Reserve, British Columbia

In August 1913 he attended the International Geological Conference, 12th Session, at the University of Toronto, Canada and his work is referred to in the 'Peace River Coal Project' of February 1972 prepared for Canada West Petroleums Ltd. of Vancouver. and Reports on Coal in the Bowron River area by Esso Coal in 1986

In 1921 he was commissioned by the Government of Sarawak to carry out surveys of the country's coal deposits, his report being printed by the South Wales Institute of Engineers in 1923, and referred to in the Singapore Free Press & Mercantile Advertiser on 16 October 1923, Page 2.

== The Call of the West ==
His travel log book The Call of the West gives a clear insight into the beauty of the area and hardship involved in being a settler in British Columbia in the early 20th century, especially in the winter when all roads and rail links could be blocked by snow. He describes in detail the different people, of all nationalities, he encountered, as well as the wild life. He includes photographs of the areas through which they travelled, their camp sites, modes of transport, etc. He describes life in his base in Vancouver and, in the final chapters, recounts his journey down the western coast of America by steamer (with photographs of San Francisco, Nicaragua, Guatemala and Panama). Pictures and written descriptions of the construction of the Panama Canal are shown, as well as his last port of call before sailing home, Jamaica. References to his comments on Vancouver, the importance of the railways to the isolated communities, and many other aspects of life in those times, are used by writers of today, for example, the attitudes of the new settlers towards the indigenous population, who had received payments to move their reservations, actually driving around in cars.

He writes of the contrasts between the mining communities in Wales and those in British Columbia.

In 1911 he applied for membership of the Order of the Golden Age, a group of dedicated vegetarians or fruitarians. In 1912 he wrote to them describing his experiences of attempting to survive in the wilds of Canada without eating flesh of any kind, which they printed in their journal 'The Herald of the Golden Age', Vol XV, No. 2 April 1912, Page 43, under the heading 'Dietetic Heroism'.

== Later years ==
He was a member of the Theosophical Society and used to travel and lecture for them.

He was also a Fellow of both the Royal Geographical Society and the Royal Colonial Institute.

He wrote several short pamphlets covering some of his lectures as well as his philosophical views of belief, and of society during the years of the Depression of the 1930s.

He was also the author of some light stories and poetry, 'Peace River and Other Verse', 'The Exploits of Lancelot: A Satire' being examples.

Christian died on 31 August 1969 at St. Columba's Hospital, Hampstead, London aged 89 years. His occupation shown on his death certificate as Philatelist.

== Bibliography ==
- "Sir William Galloway (1840–1927)". The Compact Edition of the Dictionary of National Biography. Oxford University Press. 1975. ISBN 978-0-19-865102-4.
- Galloway, C. F. J. (2010). The Call of the West: Letters from British Columbia. BiblioBazaar. ISBN 978-1-171-69846-3.
- Galloway, C. F. J. (1922). The Rational Basis of Belief. William McLellan.
- Galloway, C. F. J. (1947). Notes on Coal in Sarawak, Borneo. South Wales Institute of Engineers.
- Galloway, C. F. J. (1924). The exploits of Lancelot. London.
- Galloway, C. F. J. (1933). Poverty amidst plenty : a scientific anachronism; being a simple introduction to the new economics. Douglas Social Credit Movement. OCLC 858579055.
- Galloway, C. F. J. (1930). A Series of Eight Lectures. Douglas Social Credit Movement of New Zealand.
- Galloway, C. F. J. (1953). Peace river, and other verse. Mitre Press. OCLC 30194141.
- Galloway, C. F. J. (1913). "The Coal Measures of the Peace River Canyon". Annual Report of the Minister of Mines for the Year Ending 31st December, 1912 (PDF) (Report). Victoria, BC : Government Printer. p. K118. doi:10.14288/1.0060038.
- Galloway, C.F.J. Peace River Coal Area; coal fields of British Columbia Geological Survey. Canada 1915
