= David Galloway =

David Galloway may refer to:

- David Galloway (rugby league) (1884–1913), rugby league footballer of the 1900s and 1910s
- David Galloway (footballer) (1905–1979), association football player
- David Galloway (writer) (1937–2019), American novelist, journalist, curator
- David Galloway (botanist) (1942–2014), New Zealand lichenologist
- David A. Galloway (born 1943), chairman of the board of Bank of Montreal
- David Galloway (golfer) (born 1951), Australian professional golfer
- David Galloway (American football) (born 1959), former American football player
