= King's Guide to the Sands =

Appointment as guide to Morecambe Bay, England

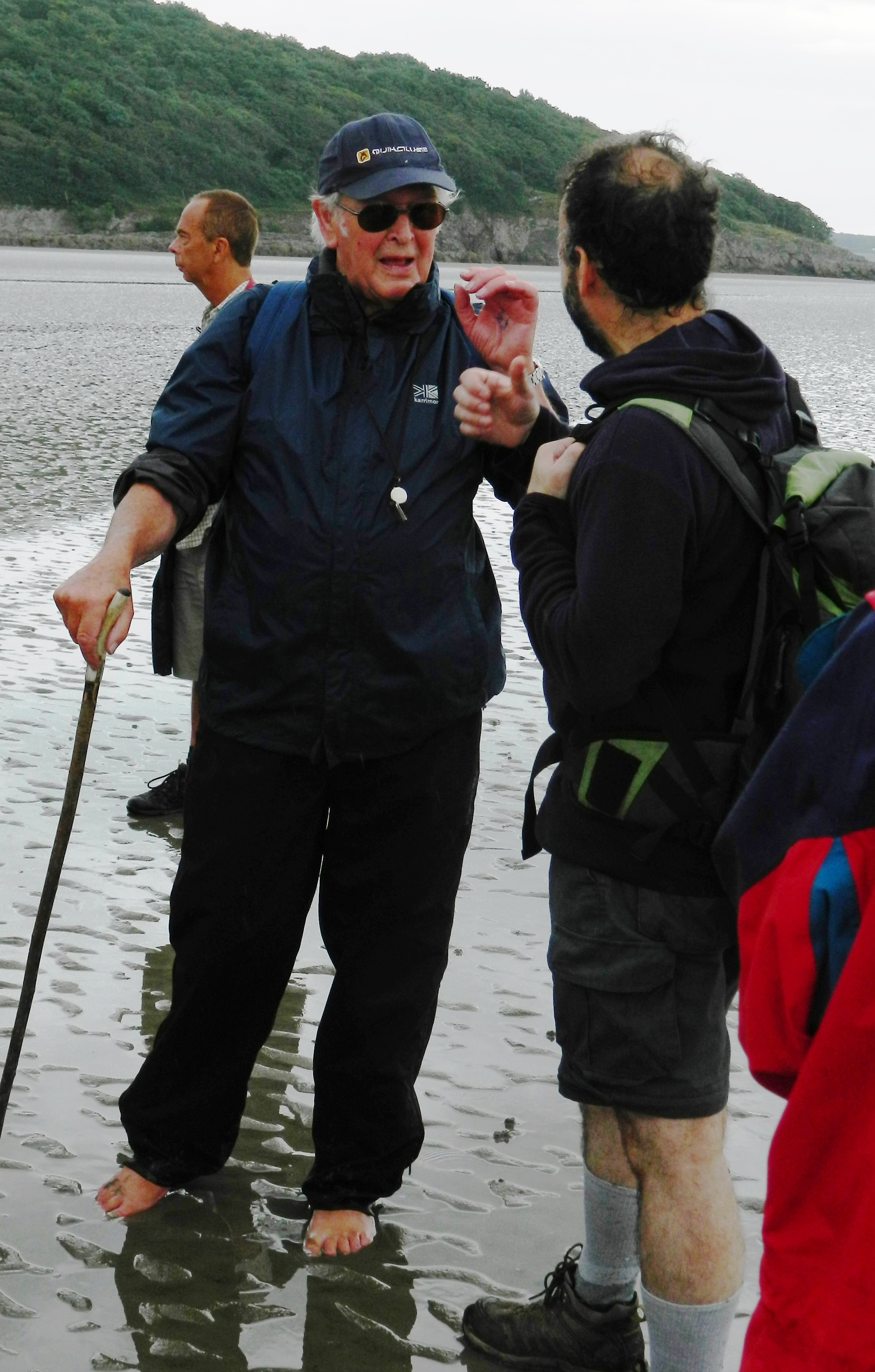
Cedric Robinson, the 25th Queen's Guide to the Sands, leading a group across Morecambe Bay in July 2014

Logo of the Guide Over Sands Trust which appoints the Guide

The King's Guide to the Sands, or, during the reign of a female monarch, Queen's Guide to the Sands, is the royally appointed guide to crossing the sands of Morecambe Bay, an ancient and potentially dangerous tidal crossing in northwest England. From 1963 until 2019, the Guide was Cedric Robinson, the 25th guide. In April 2019 Michael Wilson, a 46-year-old local fisherman, was appointed his successor. The guide is paid a nominal salary of £20 a year but the holder of the post also has the use of the grade II listed 17th-century Guide's Cottage at Kents Bank, which is owned by the Crown and managed by the Duchy of Lancaster.

== Route over the sands ==
Until the building of the Furness railway in 1857, the cross sands route had been a major transport route in the area, with Guides appointed royally since the 16th century. Before that, the monks of Furness at Cartmel Priory had provided guides for crossing the sands. In modern times a crossing of the sands has become a popular challenge walk for charity fundraisers, with the Guide often leading groups of up to 600 people. These walks are typically once a fortnight (from spring to autumn), usually from Arnside over to Kents Bank, dependent on tide and river levels (the River Kent has to be crossed at some point), and are often in support of a charity. The route is marked on some maps as a highway, and Cedric Robinson described it as "the most dangerous highway in Britain".

== Appointment ==
The first official guide was appointed by the Duchy of Lancaster on 29 January 1548, a Thomas Hogeson. A charity to control the guides was established in 1877, with the power of appointment still held by the Duchy of Lancaster, and by 2012 this had become the Guide Over Sands Trust and was given the power to appoint the Queen's Guide. It was Lord Cavendish in his role as chair of the trust who visited the 86-year-old Cedric Robinson and suggested that it was time to retire: "'At the age you've got to, Mr Robinson – Cedric,' he said, 'we'd like to take the responsibility away from you and we would like you to choose a new guide'".

== Guides ==
=== Michael Wilson, 2019–present ===
Michael Wilson (born 1972 or 1973 in Flookburgh) was appointed the 26th guide in May 2019. He is a fisherman and said: "It helps a lot having been a shrimper because you are working in the channels and that's the most dangerous part of the water".

=== Cedric Robinson, 1963–2019 ===
Cedric Robinson MBE (1933–19 November 2021) was the 25th guide for 56 years from 1963 to 2019.

=== William Burrow, 1949–1963 ===
Robinson's predecessor William Burrow was a fisherman, and was the Guide to the Kent Sands from 1949 to 1963. In 1951, when there was a royal visit to Lancaster in celebration of the 600th anniversary of the creation of the county palatine of Lancaster, Robinson and Alfred Butler, the guide to the Leven Sands, carried seven quarts of shrimp over the sands to Lancaster for the royal banquet.

=== Earlier guides ===
The Guide Over the Sands Trust maintained a list of all past guides on their website, the twenty three previous guides being:

- Jack Burrow, 1943–1950
- Jack Burrow, 1919–1943
- George Sedgwick, 1874–1918
- John Nevison, 1867–1874
- John Carter, 1856–1867
- James Carter, 1828–1856
- William Carter, 1799–1828
- William Carter, 1787–1799
- John Carter, 1761–1787
- John Carter, 1728–1761
- John Carter, 1702–1728
- John Carter, 1692–1702
- John Carter, 1685–1692
- Edward Carter, 1672–1685
- William Carter, 1659–1672
- Thomas Carter, 1649–1659
- William Carter, 1644–c.1649
- Edward Carter, 1633–1644
- Edward Carter, 1602–1633
- William Carter, 1592–1602
- William Carter, 1564–1592
- Richard Carter, ???–1564
- Thomas Hogeson, 1548–???
