= Charles Mills Galloway =

American lawyer (1875–1954)

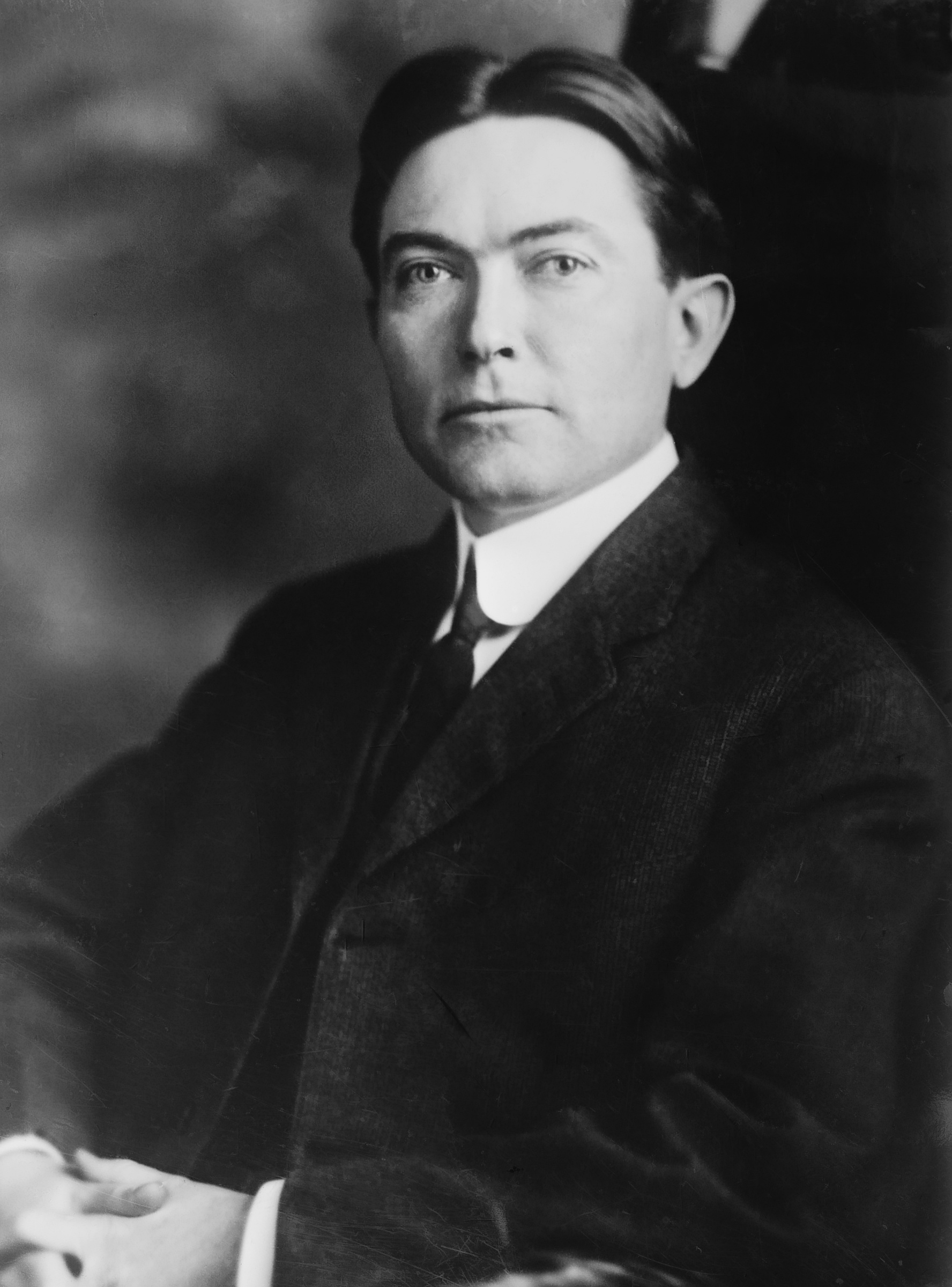
Charles M. Galloway circa 1913

Charles Mills Galloway (August 15, 1875 – September 3, 1954) of South Carolina was general counsel to the Controller General of the United States.

He was appointed by Woodrow Wilson to serve on the United States Civil Service Commission on May 22, 1913. He took his oath of office on June 20, 1913, and served until September 7, 1919. He died on September 3, 1954, in Asheville, North Carolina.
