= National Academy of Construction =

Education institution in Hyderabad, India

- Type: Public
- Established: 1998
- Chairman: Chief Minister of Telangana
- Vice Chairman: Minister of Roads and Buildings, Government of Telangana
- Location: Hyderabad, Telangana, India
- Campus: Urban, 46 acres (18.6 ha)
- Website: www.nac.edu.in

National Academy of Construction or NAC Hyderabad is an education institution for development of all types of construction resources, technologies and methodologies for fast-track completion of projects.

== History ==
The National Academy of Construction (NAC) was established in 1998 under the auspices of the state government of combined Andhra Pradesh, led by Shri Nara Chandrababu Naidu. It was registered as a 'Public Society' and established as a 'Public Charitable' institution in September of that year. NAC is situated on a sprawling 46.46-acre campus in Madhapur, Hitech City, Hyderabad, located within the state of Telangana.

== Objective ==
1. Employment generation through basic skill training for construction trades.
2. Wage enhancement and an improved quality of life.
3. Capacity building through training government and corporate officials and contractors in good construction and contract management practices.
4. Effective and efficient construction project management by training of construction managers. Construction safety management through structured safety management courses.
5. Quality supervision, stores management and quality surveying through special structured courses.
6. Enhanced quality and methods of instruction through training of trainers.

== Mission statement ==
1. Improve safety, efficiency and productivity of the Indian construction industry.
2. Upgrade knowledge and skills of construction engineers, contractors, managers, supervisors and workers.

== Recognition ==
National Academy of Construction is an ISO 9001:2008 certified institute. It is also a Vocational Training Provider as recognized by Government of India and represented on the National Council for Vocational Training.

== Regional centres ==
For administrative convenience, NAC has created six regional centres in Guntur, Kadapa, Visakhapatnam, Karimnagar, Rajahmundry and Hyderabad which are headed by regional directors and assistant directors who are appointed in each district for better co-ordination and quality control of the training programmes.

== Facilities ==
NAC has eight constituent units covering all sectors of the construction industry.

The infrastructure at Hyderabad consist of the following:

- 24 lecture halls
- Three air-conditioned seminar halls
- 500-seat air-conditioned auditorium
- Hostel for executives to accommodate 200 members
- Dormitory for workers with capacity to accommodate 500 trainees
- Post-graduate block
- Stores
- Full-fledged canteen
- Workshop sheds and open space for conducting practical training

Apart from the above, NAC has quality control and testing laboratory for construction materials, material display block, practice ground, etc.

== Faculty ==
NAC has a very experienced in-house faculty of 200 personnel and visiting faculty exposed to major projects.

== Core competencies ==
NAC's core competency is training for the three categories of Human Resources in the construction industry.

- Primary level: Mason, Bar-Bender, Form Work Carpenter, Plumber, Painter, Electrician, Welder, Operator Excavating Machinery, etc.
- Middle level: General Works Supervisor, Land Surveyor, Store Keeper, Architectural Assistant.
- Higher level: In-service engineers from government departments, major contracting firms, consultancy firms and practicing engineers.

The training programmes are conducted for candidates from all over India.
