= Andrew Jameson (politician) =

Irish politician and businessman (1855–1941)

The Right Honourable Andrew Jameson DL
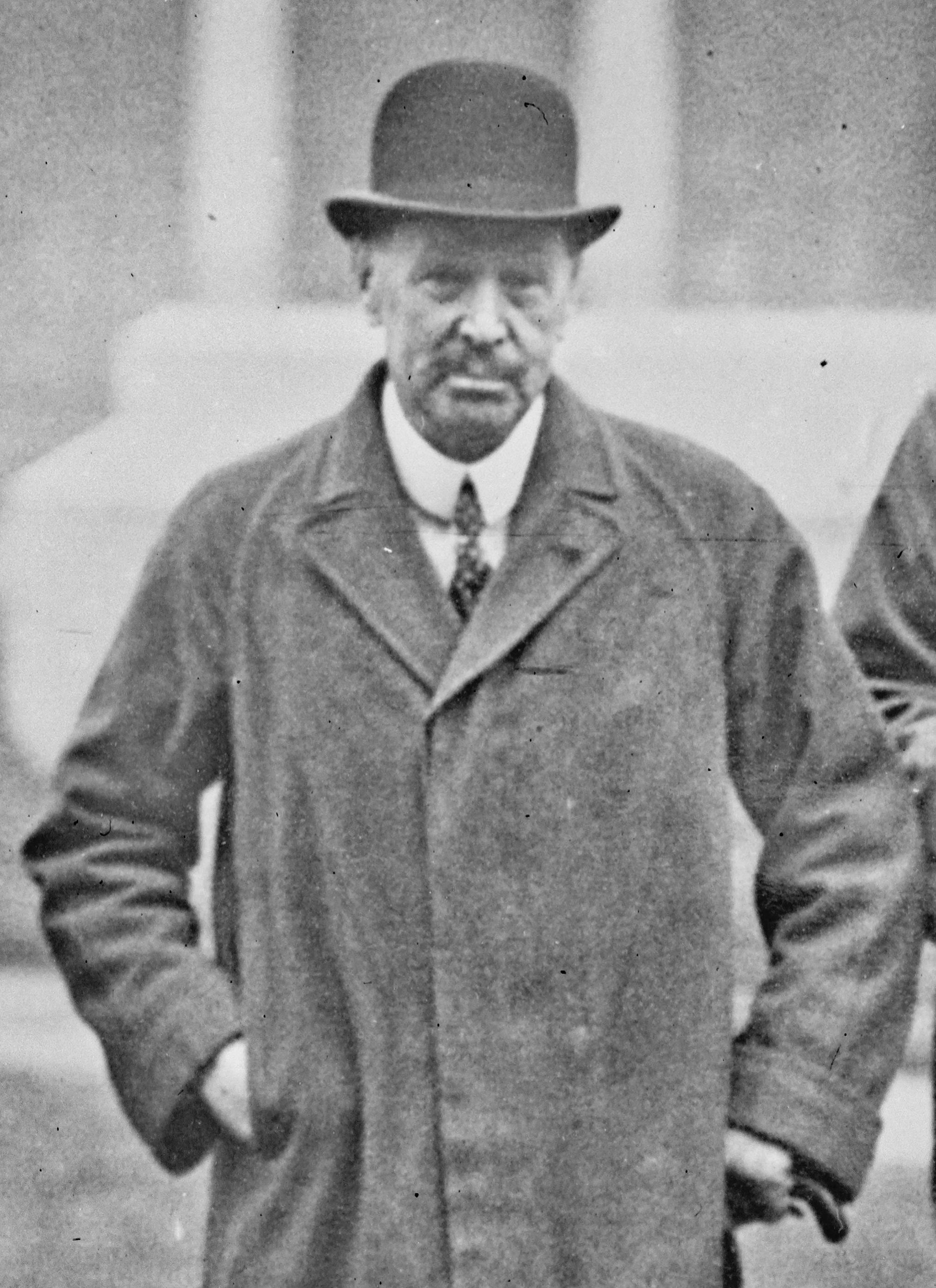
- Jameson in 1922

Senator
- In office 11 December 1922 – 19 May 1936

Governor of the Bank of Ireland
- In office 1896–1898

Personal details
- Born: 17 August 1855 Alloa, Clackmannanshire, Scotland
- Died: 15 February 1941 (aged 85) Dublin, Ireland
- Party: Independent
- Spouses: Grace Burke (m. 1874; died 1922); Ruth Hart (m. 1924)
- Children: 4, including Harriet
- Education: Trinity College, Cambridge; Trinity College Dublin

Andrew Jameson PC (Ire) DL (17 August 1855 – 15 February 1941) was a Scottish-born Irish public servant, politician and businessman. He was chairman of the Jameson whiskey business and the Irish lighthouse authority, and a member of both the Senate of Southern Ireland and then Seanad Éireann until 1936.

== Early life ==
Jameson was born in Alloa, Clackmannanshire, Scotland. He was educated at London International College, Trinity College, Cambridge and Trinity College Dublin.

== Business roles ==
Jameson was chairman of the whiskey distillers John Jameson & Son Ltd. From 1896 to 1898 he was Governor of the Bank of Ireland, remaining a director until his death in 1941. He was president of the Dublin Chamber of Commerce from 1921 to 1922.

== Public offices ==
In 1902 he was High Sheriff of County Dublin. He was also chairman of the Irish Lights Commission, which administered lighthouses in Ireland. In 1917 he was a member of the unsuccessful Irish Convention. He was appointed to the Privy Council of Ireland in the 1921 New Year Honours, entitling him to the style "The Right Honourable". In March 1921, he established the Irish Businessmen's Conciliation Committee with Sir William Goulding to galvanise opposition from Irish businesses to the partition of Ireland.

Jameson was a member of the short-lived Senate of Southern Ireland, and then from 1922 to 1936 served as a Senator of the Irish Free State. As a member of the Memorial Committee set up to establish the Irish National War Memorial Gardens, in December 1930 he advised W. T. Cosgrave, President of the Executive Council of the Irish Free State, who was very interested in bringing the memorial to fruition, on the suitability of the site running along the south bank of the River Liffey; this site was eventually decided upon by Cosgrave and agreed by the committee.

== Personal life ==
In 1877 he married Grace Burke (1854–1922), daughter of William Malachy Burke of Loughrea; they had four children, including the painter Harriet Kirkwood and lived at Sutton House on the southern shore of Howth Head. He married secondly, in 1924, Ruth Hart, daughter of George Vaughan Hart of Howth, County Dublin; they had no children. Jameson died in 1941 in Dublin.
