= Rosaleen Mills =

Irish activist and educator

- Born: Rosaleen Patricia Broughton Mills; 16 July 1905; Ballinasloe, County Galway, Ireland
- Died: 17 September 1993 (aged 88); St Mary's Nursing Home, Pembroke Road, Dublin, Ireland

Rosaleen Mills (16 July 1905 – 17 September 1993) was an Irish activist and educator.

== Early life and education ==
Rosaleen Mills was born in Ballinasloe, County Galway, on 16 July 1905. She was the fourth of the five children of John Mills and Rosetta Dobbin. Her father was Resident Medical Superintendent of the Connaught District Lunatic Asylum. She was educated at Mount Pleasant School, Ballinasloe, and the Roedean School in Brighton, England. She studied Spanish and French at Trinity College Dublin (TCD), attaining an MA in Modern Languages. While attending TCD she was an active member of the all-female Elizabethan Society, the only society women could join as members at the time.

After graduation, she lived in Germany for a year and travelled to France and Spain. In 1936 she became the first woman to address the College Historical Society. There she proposed the motion "That This House Reveres the Memory of Miss Pankhurst" at a debate chaired by Sheelagh Murnaghan. The society subsequently named an annual competition in her honour, the "Rosaleen Mills Maidens Final".

== Career ==
From 1930 to 1936, Mills taught at what became Mount Temple Comprehensive School in Clontarf, Dublin. From 1936 to 1937 she nursed her mother full-time, after which she took a position at the commercial office of the Canadian Embassy to Ireland from 1938 to 1945. She then went on to teach at the private Knockrabo School in Goatstown, Dublin until its closure in the late 1950s. In 1957 she helped to establish a new co-educational and non-denominational school, Sutton Park, in Sutton, Dublin. She served as the vice-principal until she retired in 1970.

== Activism ==
From the 1920s, Mills was active in a variety of women's organisations, beginning with those founded by suffragists. In her youth she becoming acquainted with Hanna Sheehy-Skeffington and Rosamond Jacob. She was involved in campaigns for women to be permitted to join the police force and also against the 1927 Juries Act which prohibited female jurors. She was a member of the Women's Social and Progressive League.

Mills joined the Irish Housewives Association (IHA) soon after its establishment in 1942. She took part in the IHA campaigns and was a regular contributor to The Irish Housewife, the organisation's journal. From its establishment in 1948, she sat on the council of the Irish Association of Civil Liberty. She served as president in the early 1960s. She was involved with the Dublin University Women Graduates Association. She spent a summer in Geneva in 1951 representing Irish women graduates as a delegate of the International Federation of University Women, observing at the Economic and Social Council of the United Nations. Mills was elected president of the Irish Federation of Women's Graduates' Associations in 1963.

In 1965 the UN Commission on Women issued a directive to women's organisations internationally calling on them to examine the status of women in their country. This was led in Ireland by an "ad hoc committee", chaired by Hilda Tweedy. Mills sat on the committee as an independent member. The committee outlined a number of discoveries including that Ireland had not signed or ratified a number of UN conventions relating to women. They also discovered a number of issues relating to inequality in pay, access to education and discrimination against married women. Following the findings of the committee, the Irish government established the first National Commission on the Status of Women in 1970, which presented wide-ranging recommendations for government policy changes in 1972. The Council for the Status of Women was established to ensure the implementation of the recommendations. Hilda Tweedy was elected chair and Mills as vice chair. Mills replaced Hilda Tweedy as chair in May 1976, serving until April 1977. As the precursor to the National Women's Council of Ireland, the council was the largest women's organisation in Ireland.

== Later life ==
Mills was fluent in seven languages and travelled extensively across Europe and Russia. She was also involved in the Irish Georgian Society, An Taisce, the United Arts Club and the Irish Association for Social, Cultural and Economic Relations. For most of her adult life, she lived at 37 Percy Place, Dublin 4 before moving to St Mary's Nursing Home, Pembroke Road. She died there on 17 September 1993.
