= National Women's Council of Ireland =

Irish gender equality organisation

The National Women's Council of Ireland (NWCI) (Irish: Comhairle Náisiúnta na mBan in Éirinn) is a representative organisation for women and women's groups in Ireland. It was originally known as the Council for the Status of Women.

== Policies ==
The mission of the NWCI is to achieve women's equality and empower women to work together to remove inequalities. It says it represents some 300,000 women in the Republic of Ireland.

The NWCI has worked progressively to deepen and broaden its membership base to represent a broad range of women's interests in Ireland. It was and is instrumental in setting the agenda for women's rights in Ireland. Alongside other organisations it advocated against austerity measures aimed at lone parents and other vulnerable groups of women. The NWCI experienced significant cuts in funding over the period of austerity. In recent times the NWCI has particularly focused on issues including women's mental health, violence and holding the Irish government to account through the CEDAW process.

In November 2020, on Trans Day of Remembrance, the National Women's Council of Ireland and Amnesty International Ireland co-signed a statement along with a number of LGBT+ and human rights groups condemning trans-exclusionary feminism. The letter called upon the media and politicians "to no longer provide legitimate representation for those that share bigoted beliefs, that are aligned with far right ideologies and seek nothing but harm and division" and stated that "these fringe internet accounts stand against affirmative medical care of transgender people, and they stand against the right to self-identification of transgender people in this country. In summation they stand against trans, women’s and gay rights by aligning themselves with far right tropes and stances."

== History ==
In 1973 a group of feminists, chaired by Hilda Tweedy of the Irish Housewives Association, set up the Council for the Status of Women, with the goal of gaining equality for women. It was an umbrella body for women's groups. Rosaleen Mills served as the first as vice chair, succeeding Tweedy as chair in 1976.

During the 1990s the council's activities included supporting projects funded by the European Social Fund, and running Women and Leadership Programmes and forums. In 1995, following a strategic review, it changed its name to the National Women's Council of Ireland.

== See also ==
- German Women's Council
- Norwegian Women's Lobby
