= Howth =

Peninsular suburb of Dublin in Ireland

Howth Binn Éadair (Irish)
- Suburban village and district
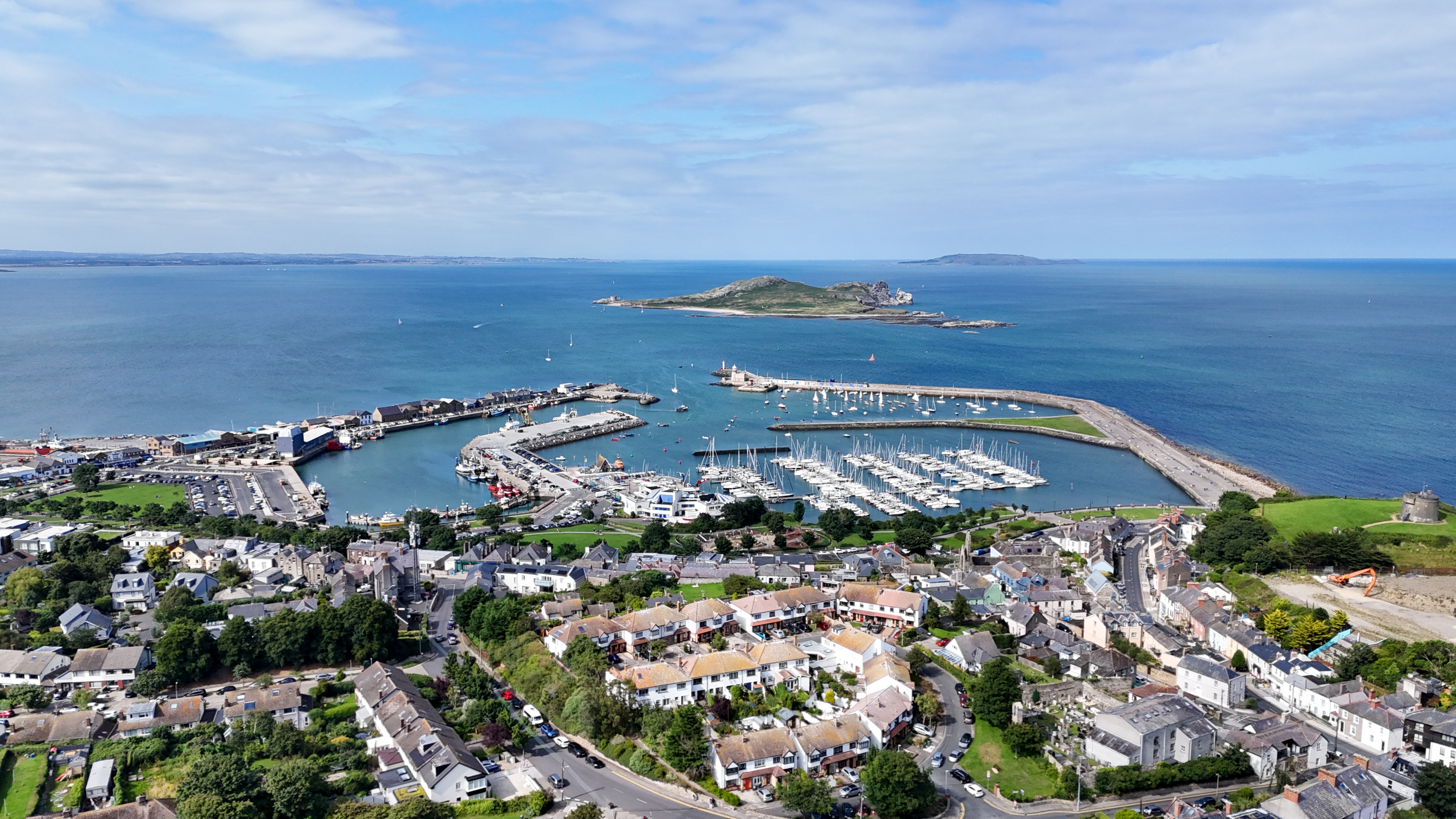
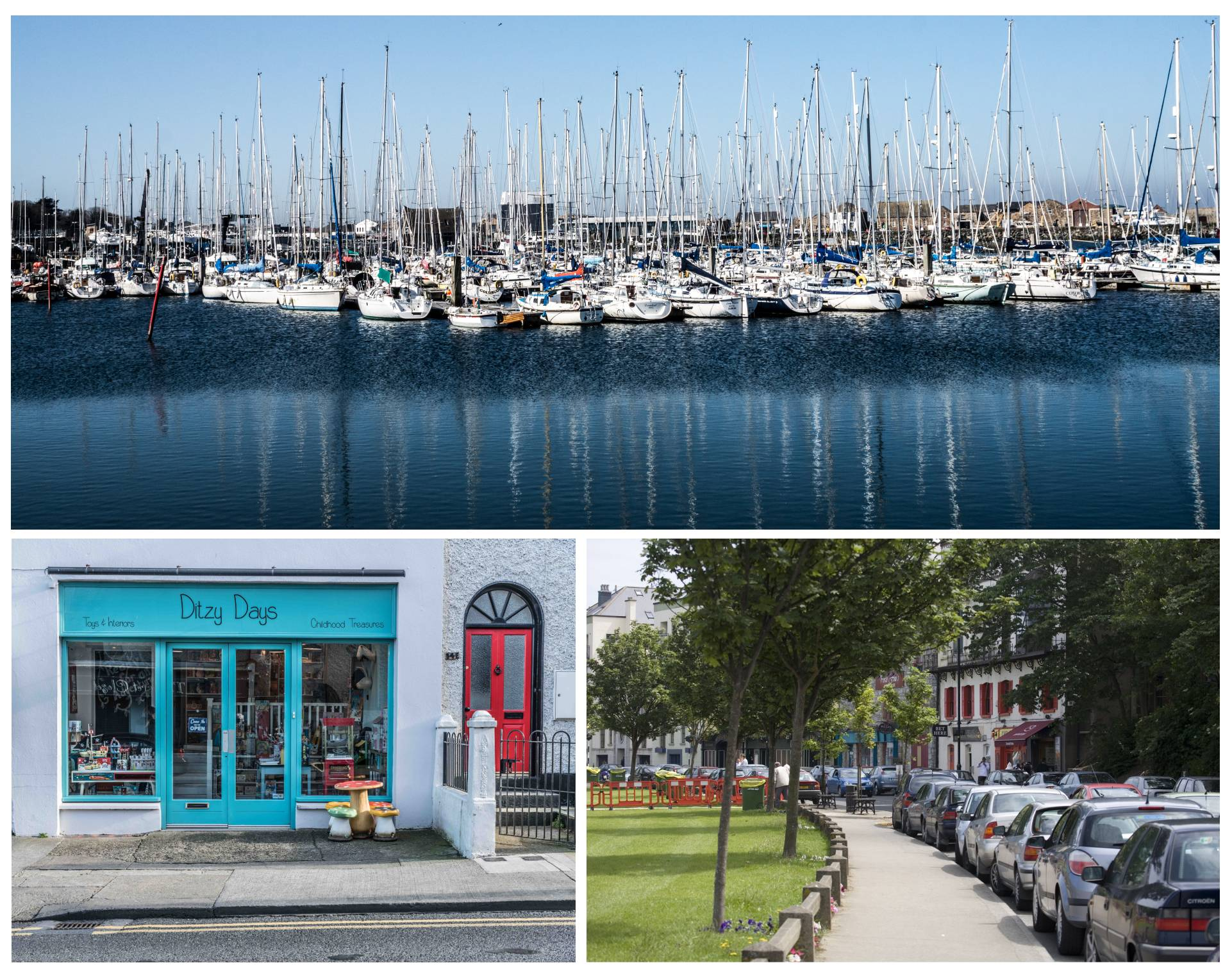
- Howth, Dublin
- Interactive map of Howth
- Location in Dublin
- Coordinates: 53.386°N 6.066°W
- Country: Ireland
- Province: Leinster
- Traditional county: County Dublin
- County: Fingal
- Highest elevation: 171 m (561 ft)
- Lowest elevation: 0 m (0 ft)

Population (2022)
  - Urban: 8,399
- Time zone: UTC±0 (WET)
  - Summer (DST): UTC+1 (IST)
- Eircode routing key: D13
- Telephone area code: +353(0)1

Howth (/ˈhoʊθ/ HOHTH; Irish: Binn Éadair, meaning 'Éadar's peak'; Old Norse: Hǫfuð) is a peninsular village and outer suburb of Dublin in Ireland. The district as a whole occupies the greater part of the peninsula of Howth Head, which forms the northern boundary of Dublin Bay, and includes the island of Ireland's Eye, which holds multiple natural protection designations.

Howth has been settled since prehistoric times, and features in Irish mythology. A fishing village and small trading port from at least the 14th century, Howth has grown to become a busy and affluent suburb of Dublin, with a mix of suburban residential development, wild hillside and heathland, golf courses, cliff and coastal paths, a small quarry and a busy commercial fishing port. The only neighbouring district on land is Sutton. Howth is also home to one of the oldest occupied buildings in Ireland, Howth Castle, and its estate.

Howth is also a civil parish in the ancient barony of Coolock.

== Location and access ==
Howth is located on the peninsula of Howth Head, which begins around 11 kilometres (6.8 mi) east-north-east of Dublin's GPO, on the north side of Dublin Bay. The village itself is located just over 14 kilometres (8.7 mi) by road from Dublin city centre (the ninth of a series of eighteenth-century milestones from the Dublin General Post Office (GPO) is in the village itself). The settlement spans much of the northern part of Howth Head, which was once an island but now is connected to the rest of Dublin via a narrow strip of land (a tombolo) at Sutton. Howth is located in the administrative county of Fingal, within the traditional County Dublin. The village is bounded by the sea and undeveloped land except along two roads, one rising towards the Summit, one running at sea level near the coast, towards Sutton Cross.

Howth is at the end of a regional road (R105) from Dublin. One branch of the DART suburban rail system has its physical terminus by the harbour, the other northern terminus being Malahide's station, which is actually on a through line for mainline rail towards Belfast. Under the bus route network for Dublin overseen by the National Transport Authority, Dublin Bus serves Howth with route H3, and the local route 290 which goes over the hill and through Sutton to Sutton DART station. For decades prior to 2021, Howth was served by the 31 series of routes. There was previously also a tram service.

Howth, in addition to its fishery harbour, hosts a substantial marina, and seasonal boat service to the uninhabited Ireland's Eye. Howth is also a waypoint for aircraft approaching Dublin Airport.

== Etymology ==
The Irish name for Howth is Binn Éadair, meaning Éadar's Peak or Hill. In Old Irish, the name is recorded as Etar, which was first plundered by the Vikings around 819. One of the possible origins of the Irish name is from Étar, wife of one of the five Fir Bolg chieftains who is reported to have died at Howth.

The name Howth is thought to be of Norse origin, perhaps being derived from the Old Norse Hǫfuð ("head" in English). Norse vikings colonised the eastern shores of Ireland and built the settlement of Dyflinn (one of two settlements which became Dublin) as a strategic base between Scandinavia and the Mediterranean.

== History ==
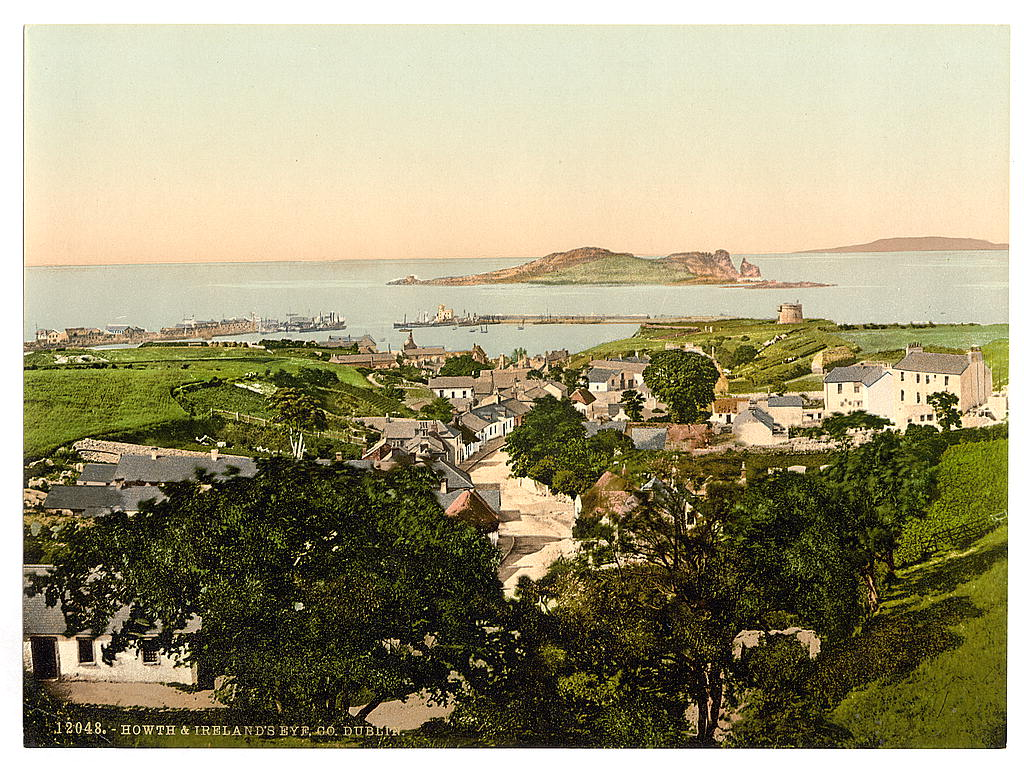
Nineteenth century postcard of Howth

On the grounds of Howth Castle is a 3000 year old dolmen tomb known as Aideen's Grave. According to legend it is the resting place of the mythological figure Aideen. This legend is the subject of the poem 'Aideen's Grave' by Samuel Ferguson.

In ancient history Ptolemy's second-century map of Ireland shows Howth as an island named Edri Deserta (sometimes rendered as Edros).

=== 11th to 16th centuries ===
After Brian Ború, the High King of Ireland, defeated the Norse in 1014, many Norse fled to Howth to regroup and remained a force until their final defeat in Fingal in the middle of the 11th century. Howth still remained under the control of Irish and localised Norse forces until the invasion of Ireland by the Anglo-Normans in 1169.

Without the support of either the Irish or Scandinavian powers, Howth was isolated and fell to the Normans in 1177. One of the victorious Normans, Armoricus (or Almeric) Tristram, was granted much of the land between the village and Sutton. According to the historian Samuel Lewis:

In 1177, Sir Amorey Tristram and Sir John de Courcy landed here at the head of a large military force, and totally defeated the Danish inhabitants in a sanguinary battle at the bridge of Evora, over a mountain stream which falls into the sea near the Baily lighthouse. This victory secured to Sir Amorey the lordship of Howth, of which his descendants have continued in possession to the present day, under the name of St. Laurence, which Almaric, third baron, assumed in fulfilment of a vow previously to his victory over the Danes near Clontarf, in a battle fought on the festival of that saint. The territory of Howth was confirmed to Almaric de St. Laurence by King John....

Tristam built his first castle overlooking the harbour and the St. Lawrence link remained until 2019 (see Earl of Howth). The original title of Baron of Howth was granted to Almeric St. Lawrence by Henry II of England in 1181, for one Knight's fee.

Howth was a minor trading port from at least the 14th century, with both health and duty collection officials supervising from Dublin, although the harbour was not built until the early 19th century.

A popular tale concerns the clan leader and sometime pirate Gráinne O'Malley, who was rebuffed in 1576 while attempting a courtesy visit to Howth Castle, home of the Earl of Howth. In retaliation, she abducted the Earl's grandson and heir, and as ransom, she exacted a promise that unanticipated guests would never be turned away again. She also made the Earl promise that the gates of Deer Park (the Earl's demesne) would never be closed to the public again, and the gates are still open to this day, and an extra place is set for unexpected guests during formal dinners in the dining room.

=== 19th century ===
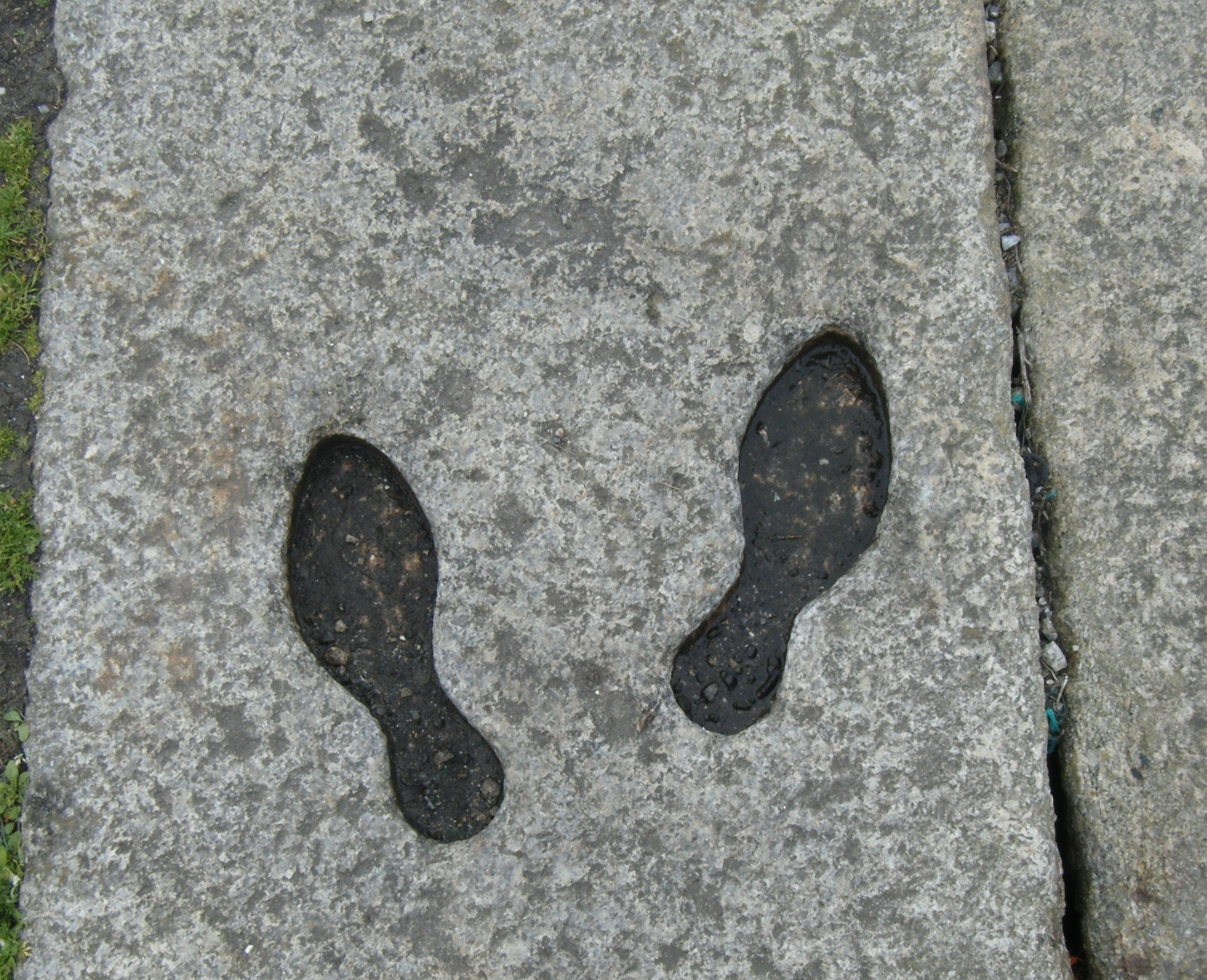
Imprint of George IV's footsteps on the West Pier

In the early 19th century, Howth was chosen as the location for the harbour for the mail packet (postal service) ship. Construction began in 1807. One of the arguments used against Howth by the advocates of Dún Laoghaire was that coaches might be raided in the badlands of Sutton (at the time Sutton was open countryside). However, due to silting, the harbour needed frequent dredging to accommodate the packet and the service was relocated to Dún Laoghaire in 1809, after £350,000 had been spent on Howth. English King George IV visited the harbour in August 1821, which is remembered today by an imprint of his shoes (see left picture) carved by a local stonemason on the West Pier.

The population was 1,538 inhabitants at the time of the 1841 census.

Irish poet and writer William Butler Yeats was a resident of Howth in the 19th century. There is a blue plaque dedicated to Yeats at Balscadden House on Balscadden Road which was his cottage home from 1880 to 1883. The plaque contains the couplet “I have spread my dreams under your feet/ Tread softly because you tread on my dreams” from his poem 'Aedh Wishes for the Cloths of Heaven' (1899). Howth would feature in Yeats writings. The first time is the 1893 essay 'Village Ghosts' recounting the paranormal folklore of the village and the second is in the poem 'Beautiful Lofty Things' (1938); "Maud Gonne at Howth station waiting a train".

=== 20th century to present ===
On 26 July 1914, 900 rifles were landed at Howth by Erskine Childers for the Irish Volunteers. Many were used against the British in the Easter Rising and in the subsequent Anglo-Irish War. Among the members of the Howth branches of the Irish Volunteers and Cumann na mBan who participated in this event were the well-known writers Padraic Colum and Mary Colum. Members of both the Howth Volunteers and Baldoyle section of the Irish Citizen Army participated in the Easter Rising in Dublin city and in Fingal. A strong local branch of Sinn Féin developed in the area and there was considerable local involvement in both the Irish War of Independence and Irish Civil War.

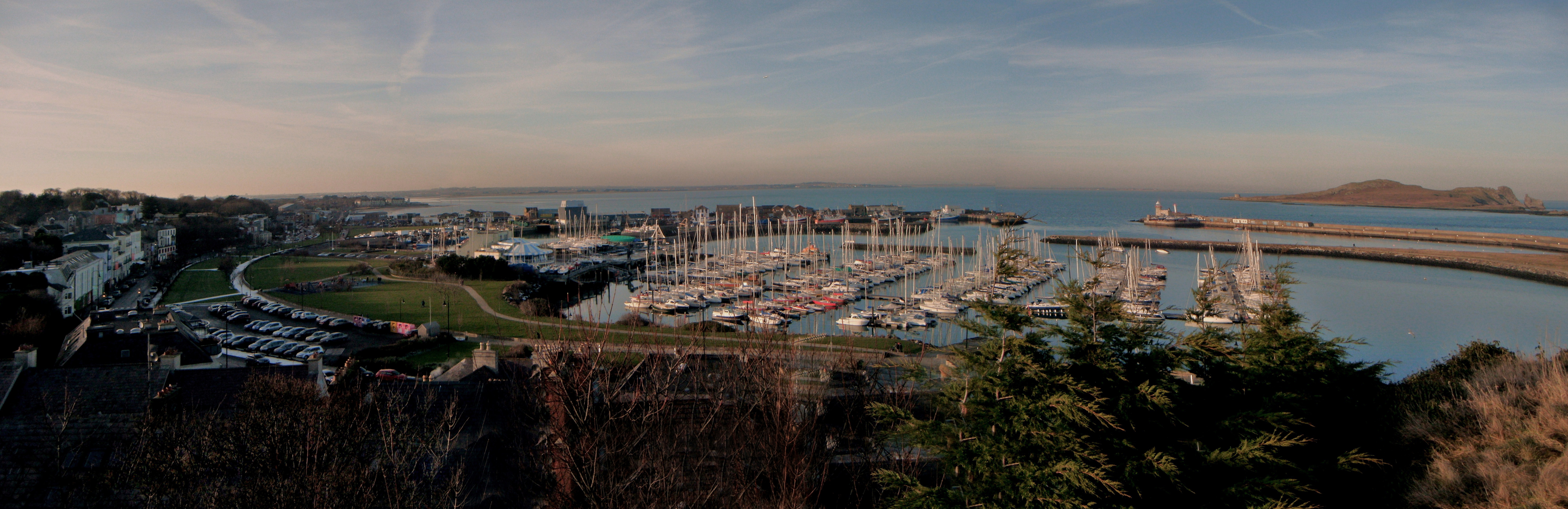
Panoramic view of Howth harbour, 2011

The harbour was radically rebuilt by the Office of Public Works in the late 20th century (a documentary was done on the much-delayed project in 1986), with distinct fishing and leisure areas formed, and the installation of a modern ice-making facility. A new lifeboat house was later constructed, and Howth is today home to units of both the RNLI (lifeboat service) and the Irish Coastguard.

In 2019, Howth Castle and its demesne, including Ireland's Eye, were sold to Tetrarch Investment group, with an element of the site close to the demesne gate immediately sold on again for development, to Glenveagh Properties.

== Nature ==
=== Natural features ===
Howth Head is one of the dominant features of Dublin Bay, with a number of peaks, the highest of which is Black Linn. In one area, near Shielmartin, there is a small peat bog, the "Bog of the Frogs". The wilder parts of Howth can be accessed by a network of paths (many are rights of way) and much of the centre and east is protected as part of a Special Area of Conservation of 2.3 square kilometres (570 acres), as well as by a Special Amenity Area Order.

The peninsula has a number of small, fast-running streams, three of which run through the village, with more, including the Bloody Stream, in the adjacent Howth Demesne. The streams passing through the village are, from east to west, Coulcour Brook (falling to Balscadden Bay), Gray's Brook or the Boggeen Stream (falling to the eastern end of the harbour), and Offington Stream (passing under Findlater's to the western side of the harbour). Other streams are met along the cliff walks, including the Whitewater Brook, with a tributary in a sunken area of plants and ponds, and then the Balsaggart Stream.

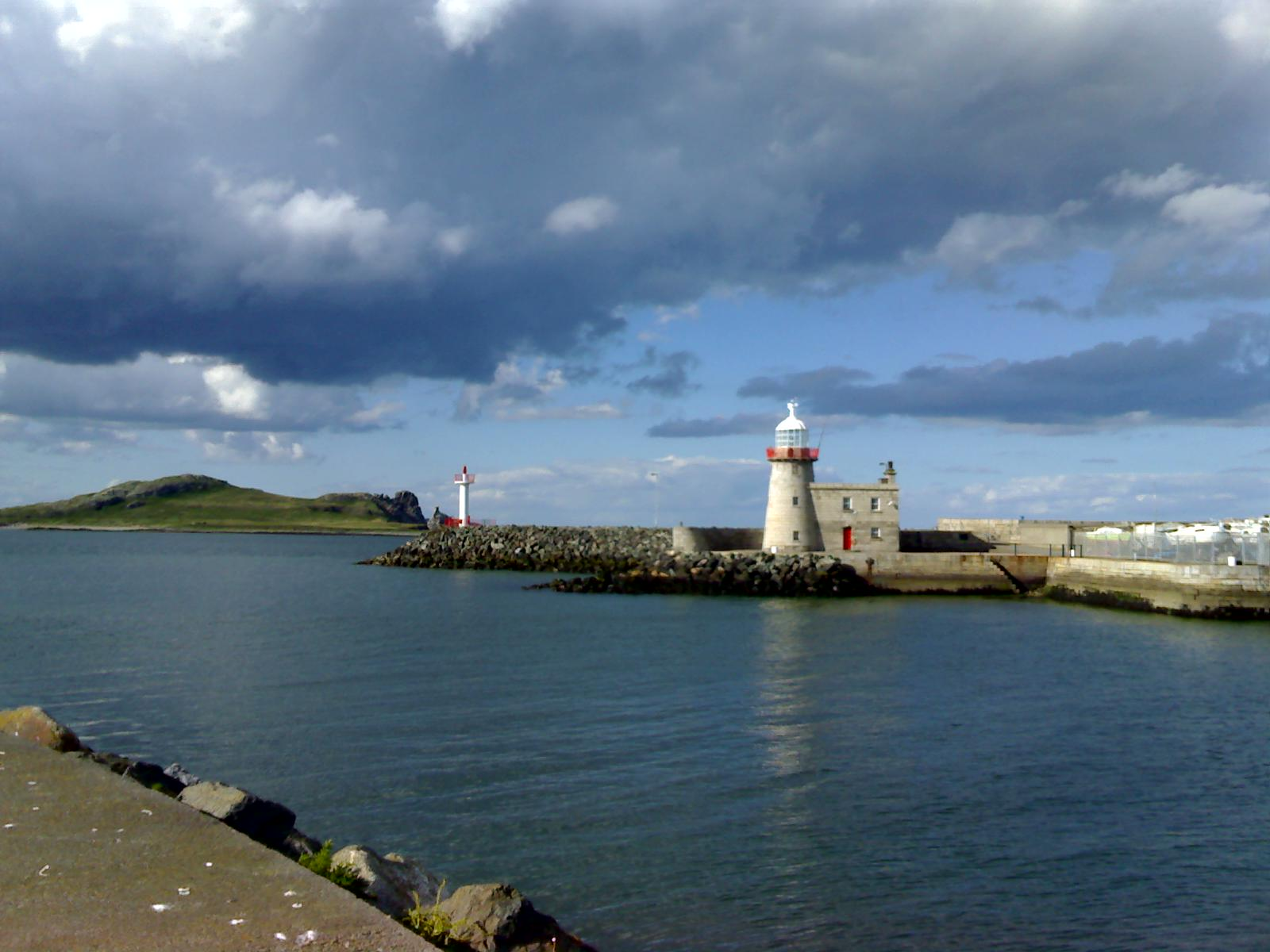
Howth Lighthouse and Ireland's Eye

The island of Ireland's Eye, part of the Special Area of Conservation, lies about a kilometre north of Howth harbour, with Lambay Island some 5 km further to the north. A Martello tower exists on each of these islands with another tower overlooking Howth harbour (opened as a visitor centre and Ye Olde Hurdy Gurdy Museum of Vintage Radio on 8 June 2001) and another tower at Red Rock, Sutton. These are part of a series of towers built around the coast of Ireland during the 19th century.

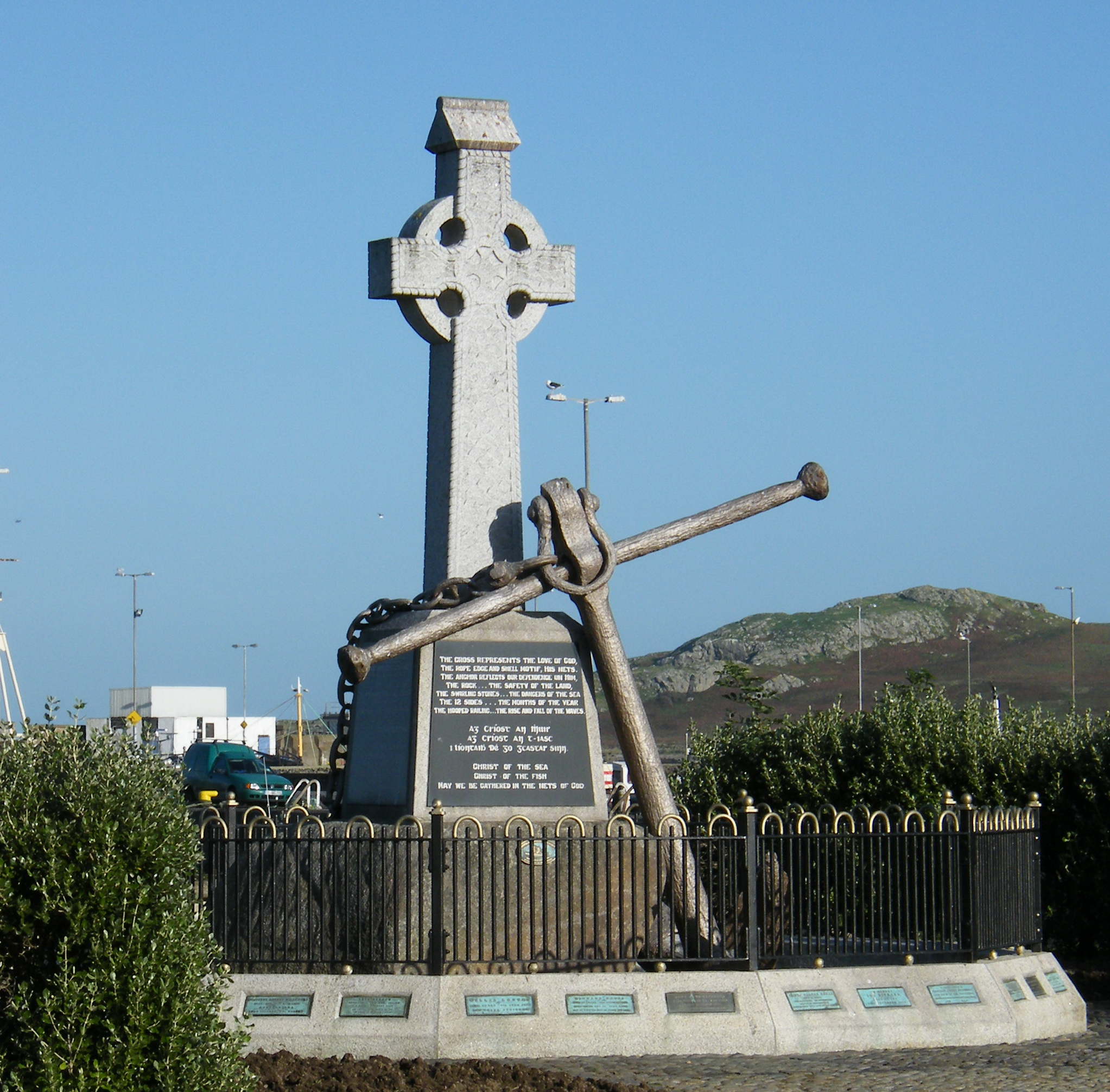
Fisher's Cross

=== Special amenity area order (SAAO) ===
More than half of Howth Head, and of the Howth area, totalling around 1,500 acres, is subject to a Special Amenity Area Order, a provision of Irish law designed to protect areas of natural beauty or biodiversity. Prepared by the local authority, after a consultative process under a community environmental process known as SEMPA, and formally proposed by Brendan Howlin as a minister, the order was developed in cooperation with a unit of Trinity College Dublin. It was made in 1999, confirmed in 2000, and is subject to 5-yearly reviews, the most recent having been conducted in 2015. At the time of its making the majority of the lands covered formed part of the Howth Estate, with the other significant landowners being developers Treasury Holdings (85 hectares) and Gerry Gannon (33 hectares), and Howth Golf Club (48 hectares). The Council stated that the order was needed to protect the environment of the designated area by restricting development there, while recognising the need "to encourage tourism-related developments in the remainder of Howth".

The SAAO area runs from the vicinity of Bottle Quay northeast to Muck Rock, east to the reservoir at Balkill, east and south around the Loughoreen Hills and Black Linn, then to the Summit, turning north along the line of the Coulcour Brook, then taking in a narrow part of Howth village, including the Martello Tower and East Pier, and Ireland's Eye. It also covers a network of over 20 km of designated footpaths and rights of way, and it was stated that "all existing scenic views and prospects from the entire length of public footpaths and roads in the area are to be protected".

Fingal County Council explained the need for the order, noting that between the 1940s and the present day "Howth has been transformed from a rural area to a suburban extension of Dublin city" and that its natural or "semi-natural" areas had shrunk from over 70% to around 40% of land area, while highly developed areas had risen from 14% to 30%.

=== Flora and fauna ===
As a semi-isolated area, Howth's flora and fauna have been studied in some detail, and a Flora of Howth, for example, was issued in 1887.

== Built heritage ==
Howth Castle, and its estate, at least part of which is known as Deer Park, are key features of the area. Corr Castle also previously formed part of the estate.

=== Aideen's Grave ===
On the grounds of Howth Castle lies a collapsed megalithic dolmen (portal tomb), known locally as Aideen's Grave.

=== Bailey Lighthouse ===
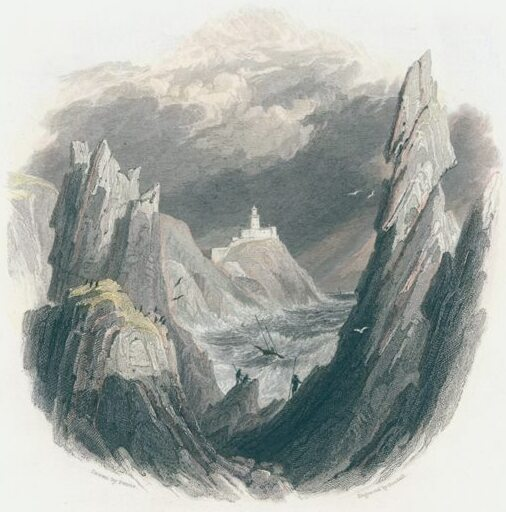
Howth Lighthouse, from the Needles, after George Petrie

At the southeast corner of Howth Head, in the area known as Bail(e)y (historically, the Green Bayley) is the automated Baily Lighthouse, successor to previous aids to navigation, at least as far back as the late 17th century. This is the subject of a picture, Howth Lighthouse, from the Needles, by George Petrie, which appears in Fisher's Drawing Room Scrap Book, 1835, with an attached poetical illustration by Letitia Elizabeth Landon. At the end of the East Pier of Howth Harbour are the Howth Harbour Lighthouse, built in the 19th century and no longer in service, and the pole-mounted light which replaced it.

=== St. Mary's Church ===
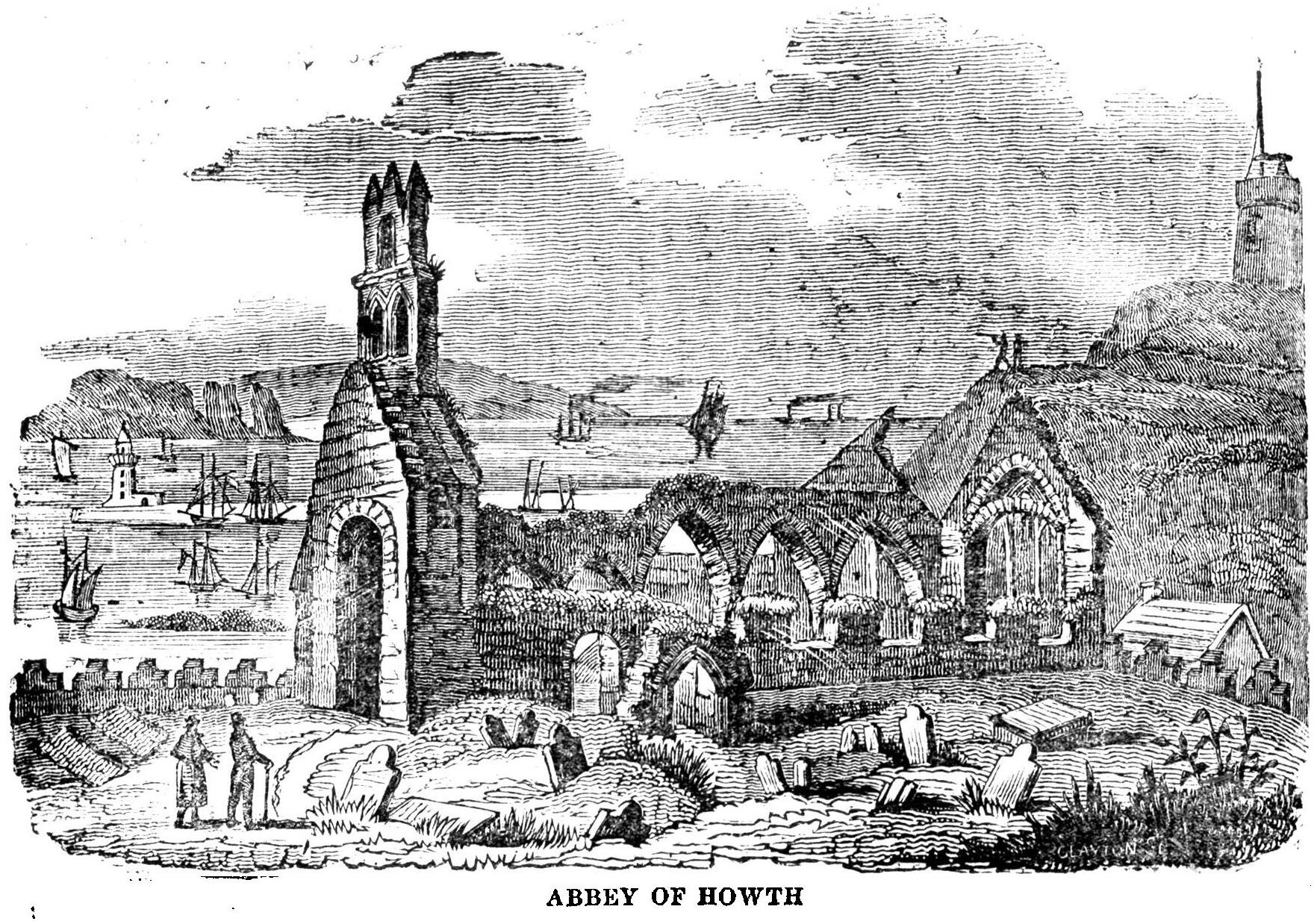
The Abbey of Howth in 1833, Dublin Penny Journal

In Howth village are St. Mary's Church and its graveyard, overlooking the harbour. The earliest church on this site was built by Sitric, King of Dublin, in 1042. It was replaced around 1235 by a parish church, when that function was moved from the church on Ireland's Eye, and then, in the second, half of the 14th century, the present church was built. The building was modified in the 15th and 16th centuries, when the gables were raised, a bell cote was built and a new porch and south door were added. The St. Lawrence family, of nearby Howth Castle, also modified the east end to act as a private chapel; inside is the tomb of Christopher St Lawrence, 2nd Baron Howth, who died in 1462, and his wife, Anna Plunkett of Ratoath.

The church was replaced with the current St Mary's Church of Ireland in the grounds of Howth Castle in 1866.

=== The College ===
Also of historic interest is a building known as The College or The Old College, on Abbey Street which was primarily constructed in the late 15th or early 16th century but also with earlier medieval elements.

=== Other structures ===
Drumleck Castle on a promontory in the Censure area of Howth was formerly on the Record of Protected Structures but removed as there were no structural elements remaining above ground to warrant retention. Alternative protection remains under the National Monuments Acts 1930–2004, as a Record Monument RMP Ref No. DU019-007.

== Amenities and businesses ==
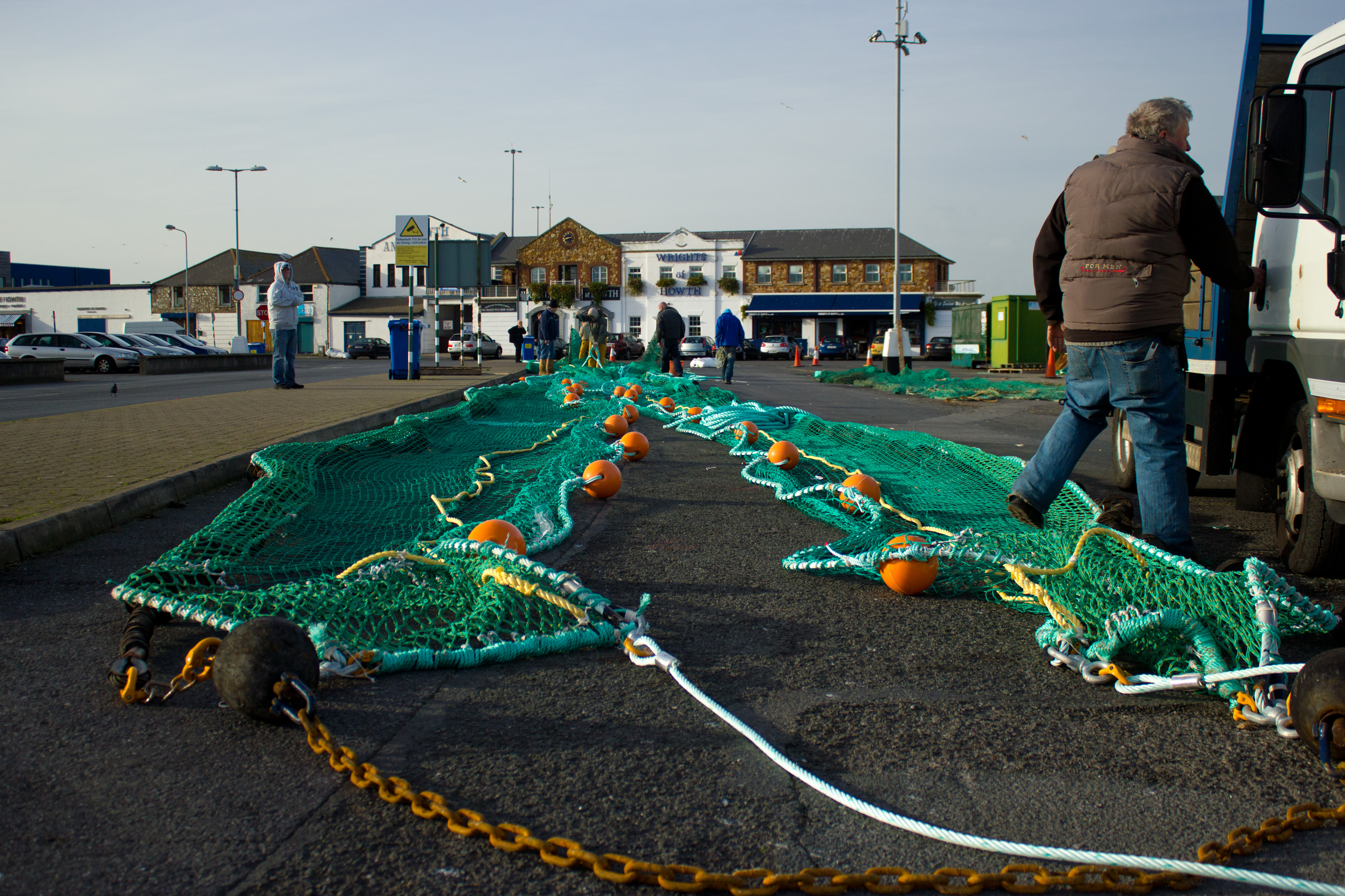
Fishing nets and fishermen in Howth

Howth remains an active centre of the fishing industry, one of Ireland's "tier 2" fishing ports, with some processing performed in the fishing harbour area, and some boat maintenance. There is a State Fisheries Centre, including an ice-making plant, and a dry dock.

The area is active commercially, with a range of retail and leisure outlets, including multiple restaurants, two convenience stores and a post office, although the nearest supermarket is at Sutton Cross and the nearest service stations are in Baldoyle and Bayside.

Howth, having once held at least seven hotels, four still as of 1990, saw the last, the Deer Park Hotel, on the Howth Estate, close in April 2014, although the premises continued to trade as a bar, and base for the Deer Park golf courses and a 'FootGolf' course, and later housed refugees. The area has multiple bed-and-breakfast establishments, and Airbnb hosts. The nearest operational hotel, The Marine Hotel (formerly the Golfers Hotel and the Strand Hotel), is located at Sutton Cross, approximately 2.5 km from Howth harbour. Other hotels that have closed include The Howth Lodge Hotel (formerly the Claremont Hotel), The Baily Court Hotel (formerly The Royal Hotel), The Saint Lawrence Hotel, Sutton Castle Hotel (part of its grounds were located in a remote part of Howth), the Waverley Hotel on Kitestown Road (burned down in the 1960s) and the Asgard Hotel (formerly The Dalriada Hotel) on Balscadden Bay. The Asgard hotel was famously owned by Phil Lynott and operated by his mother Philomena Lynott when it burned down in 1982, later being replaced by apartments.

== Recreation ==
Large numbers of tourists visit Howth annually for the views from the summit, to walk the piers and to taste locally sourced seafood.

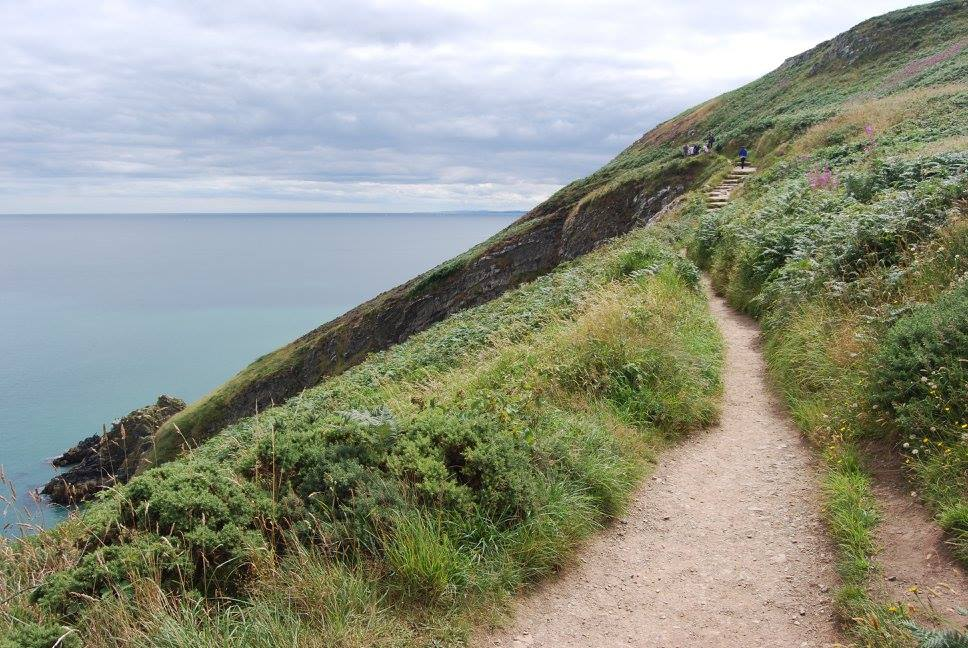
A photo from the first few kilometres of the Howth Cliff Path Loop near Dublin, Ireland

Howth is a common area for birdwatching and sailing, and is also popular with anglers. Fish like cod and ray can be caught from Howth's rocky shore marks. Sea mammals, such as seals, are common sights in and near the harbour. It used to be popular to feed the seals but authorities banned the practice for a variety of reasons. Birds seen regularly include razorbill, guillemot, fulmar, kittiwake, cormorant, stonechat, linnet, whitethroat, yellowhammer, skylark, wheatear, swallow, house martin, peregrine, buzzard and kestrel.

Howth is also a destination for cyclists, joggers and hill-walkers alike, particularly on weekends. One attraction is the six-kilometre long Cliff Path Loop. The loop walk takes about two hours to complete, is rated with an easy to moderate difficulty, and begins and ends at the Howth DART [Railway] Station. Another common walk is the original Cliff Walk to Red Rock in Sutton.

== Administration and representation ==
Howth was within County Dublin from the introduction of the shire structure by the Normans, and within North Dublin rural district from its creation under the Local Government (Ireland) Act 1898. In 1918, Howth became a separate urban district with the consent of the Local Government Board for Ireland and despite the opposition of North Dublin rural district council. In 1942, it was transferred to Dublin county borough, with Dublin Corporation superseding the urban district council. In 1985, it was removed from the city and reassigned to the county. In 1994, it was in the area that became Fingal, the successor north of the River Liffey to County Dublin. In local elections, the Howth–Malahide local electoral area elects 7 councillors to Fingal County Council.

Howth is in the Dáil constituency of Dublin Bay North and the Dublin European Parliament constituency.

== Popular culture ==
Howth has been a filming location for movies such as The Last of the High Kings, Boy Eats Girl, Love, Rosie and Sing Street.

== Notable residents ==
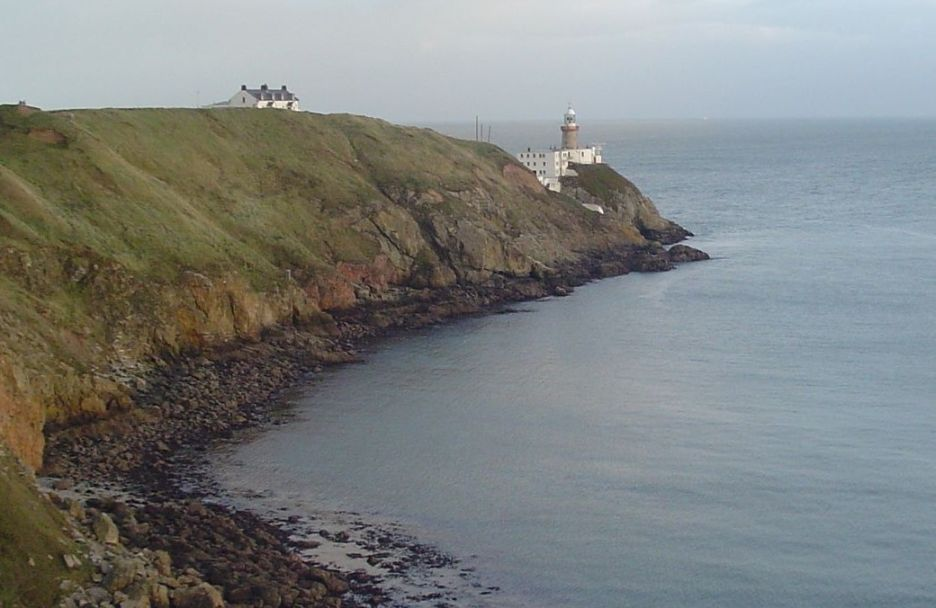
The Baily Lighthouse, on the eastern side of Howth Head viewed from the south-west

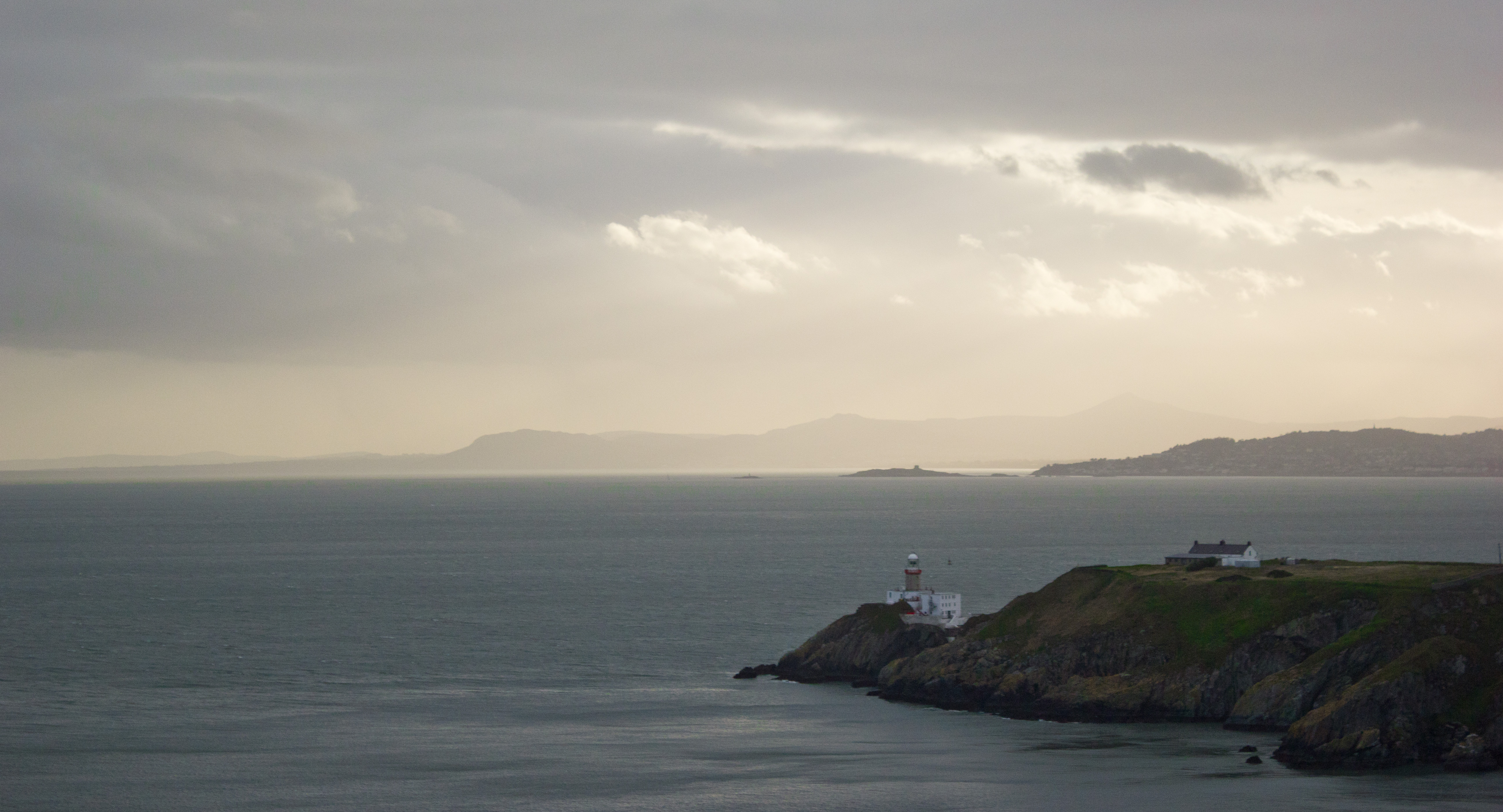
The Baily Lighthouse on the eastern side of Howth Head viewed from the north-west

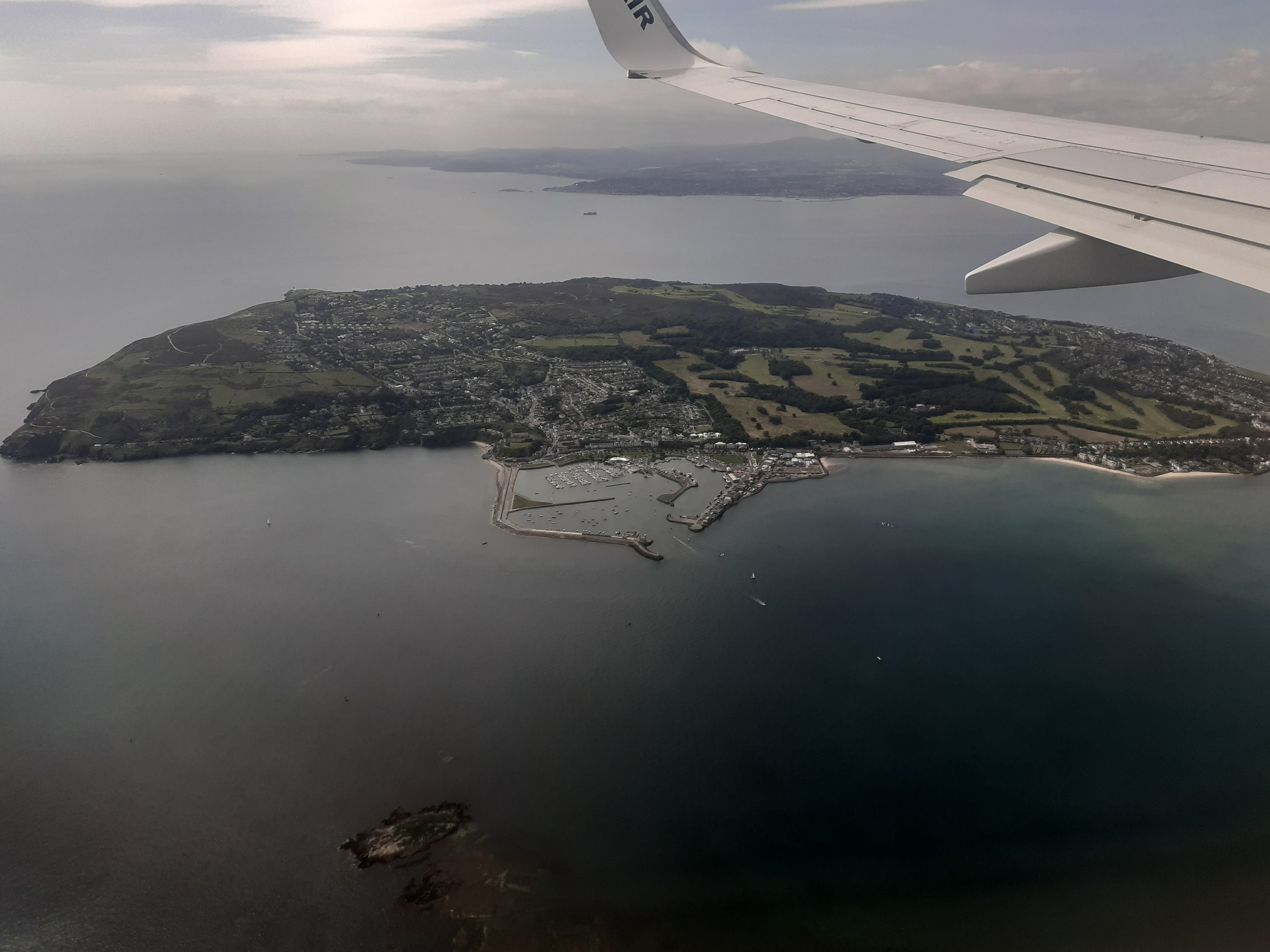
Howth View by plane

Among Howth's better-known residents are or have been:

- Robin Allshire, geneticist, was born in Howth in 1960
- Booker Prize-winning novelist John Banville
- Sir Edward Richard Borough, 2nd Baronet, lived at Glenaveena House, later occupied by John O'Hagan; the property was later turned into the Stella Maris convent
- Composer Brian Boydell, born in Howth in 1917
- James Bayley Butler, botanist and biologist, father of Katherine Butler; built a house called Glenlion in the Baily area of Howth
- Broadcaster Gay Byrne and his wife, musician and author Kathleen Watkins, who lived in the Baily region of Howth for decades, and later passed their home to one of their daughters
- Writer Michael Feeney Callan
- Actor writer and comedian Gary Cooke who lived on the Claremont Road Howth in the 1970s and 1980s
- Eminent judge Gerald FitzGibbon who lived here for many years until his death in 1909; his house, Kilrock, was one of the centres of Dublin social life from the 1870s onwards
- High Court Judge Feargus Flood of the eponymous tribunal
- Gerry Gannon, builder and property developer
- Actor and producer Brendan Gleeson, who moved to the Baily region of Howth
- Bill Graham, journalist and author, who lived in Howth until his death in 1996
- Kevin Grogan, former Manchester United and Ireland professional soccer player
- Patrick Hillery, former TD and President of Ireland
- Johnny Logan (singer), winner of the Eurovision multiple times, lived here for many years, along with his father, tenor Patrick O'Hagan
- Sir John Lumsden, physician
- John Pentland Mahaffy
- John McColgan and wife Moya Doherty, founders of Riverdance, resident in Howth for many years
- Barney McKenna of The Dubliners (died 5 April 2012)
- Broadcaster Seán Moncrieff, resident
- U2 drummer Larry Mullen, who lives overlooking Burrow Beach
- The late politician and writer Conor Cruise O'Brien and his wife, the Irish poet Máire Mhac an tSaoi, who lived here for many years
- Ruairi O'Connor, known for his role as Prince Harry (later Henry VIII) in The Spanish Princess (2019–present) and Michael in the TV series Delicious
- Rosie O'Donnell, comedian and actress
- European Ombudsman Emily O'Reilly Ryan
- Dolores O'Riordan (1971–2018) of The Cranberries
- Senator and retail pioneer Feargal Quinn (died 2019) and members of his family
- Lobsang Rampa, English author, lived at Ben Eadair, Balscadden Road, in the late 1950s, as described in his book The Rampa Story (1960)
- Lynn Redgrave and husband John Clark; raised their family there in the early 1970s
- David Robinson, horticulturalist
- Saoirse Ronan, actress, moved from Carlow to Howth with her family and later bought a house in the Thormanby part of Howth
- John Sheahan of The Dubliners
- The Stokes family including Margeret, Whitley (junior), William (junior) and father Dr. William Stokes lived at The Tansey on Ceanchor Road and at Carrrickbrack House
- Actor Stuart Townsend, born and raised in Howth
- Ella Webb MBE
- Vogue Williams formerly of Ceannchor Road, Baily; currently owns an apartment in St. Lawrences with her husband Spencer Matthews
- William Butler Yeats
- Scott Young, who was a Canadian journalist, sportswriter and novelist, and the father of musicians Neil Young and Astrid Young; lived in Howth in the late 1980s

== Transport ==
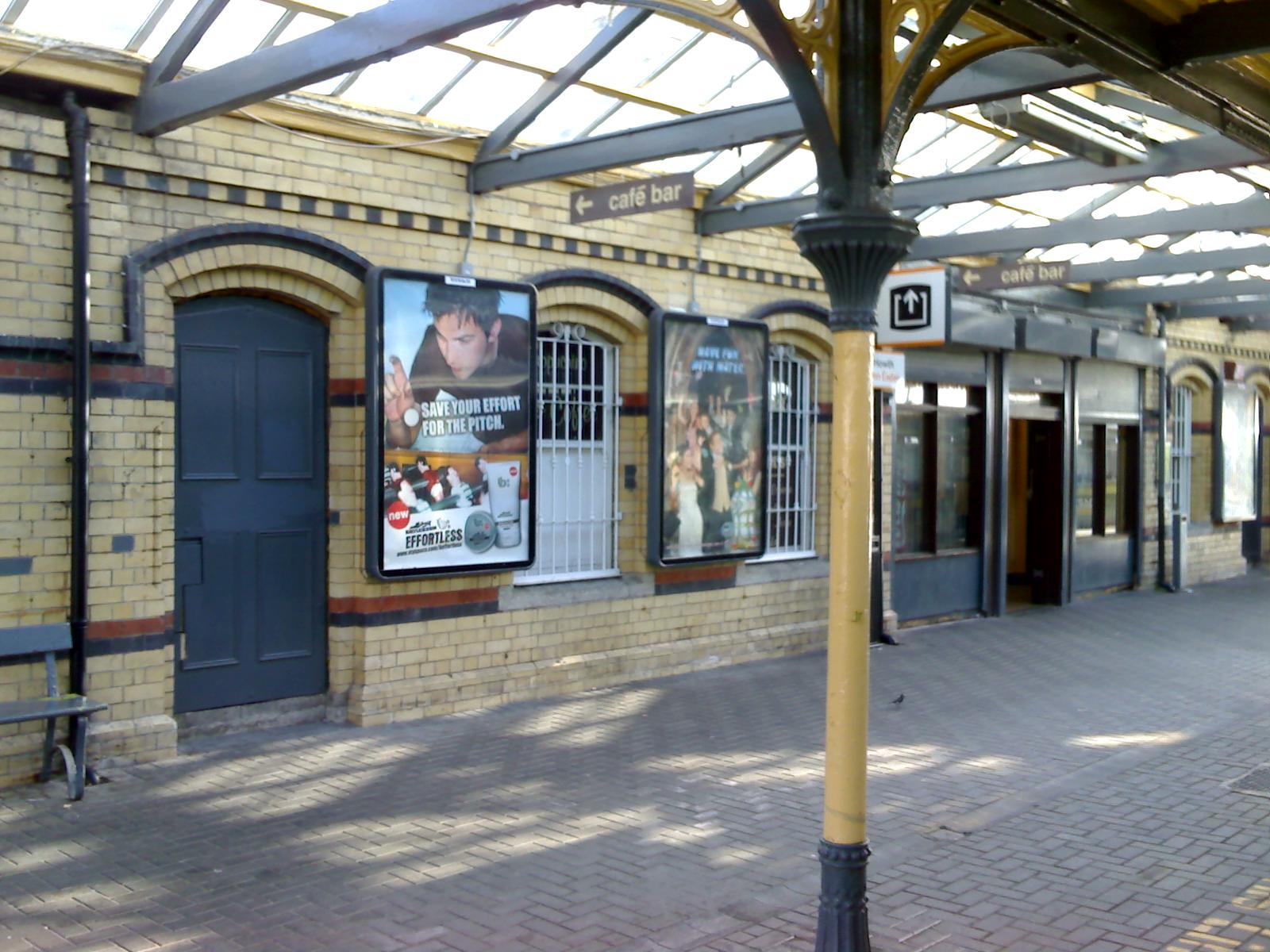
DART – Howth Station

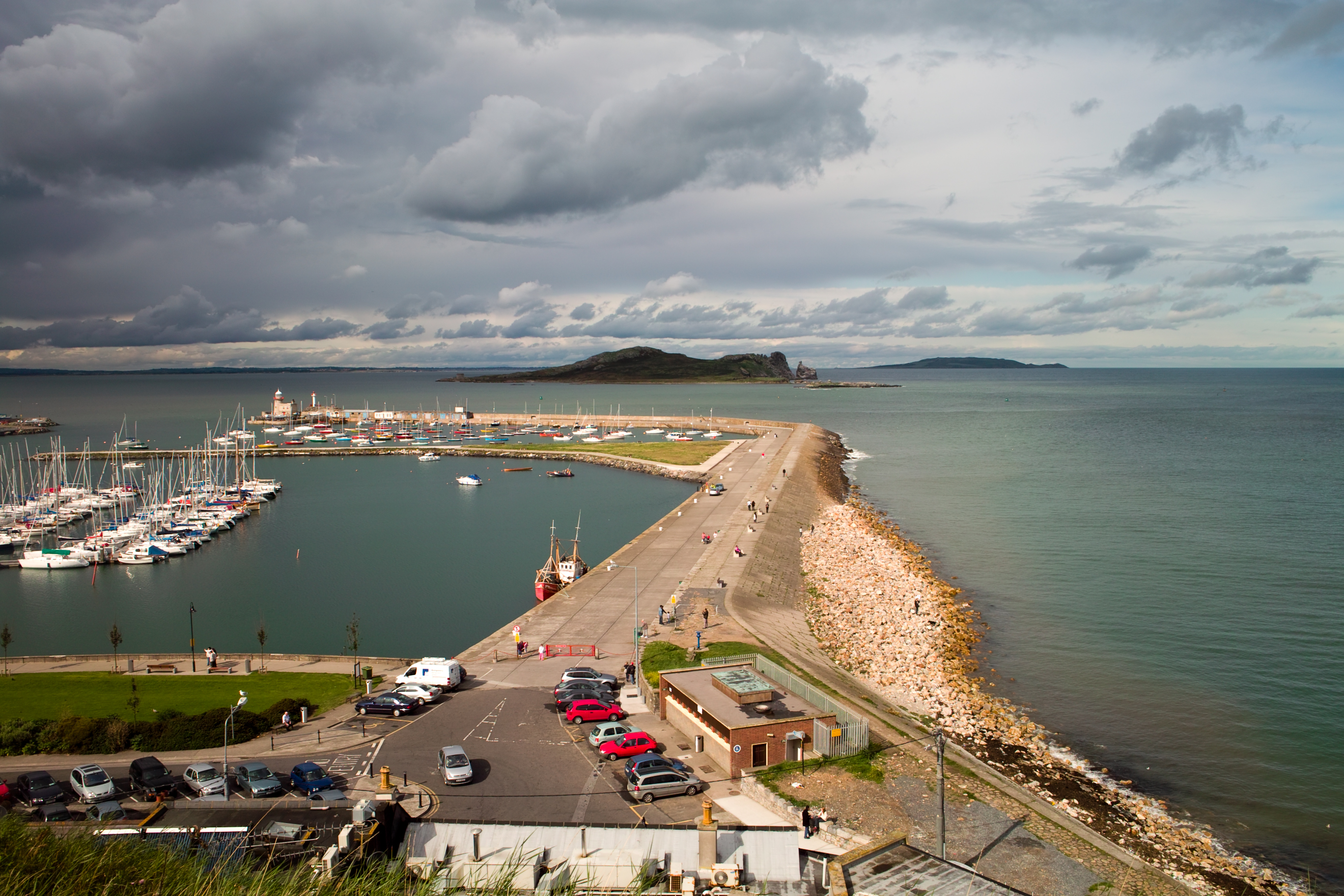
Howth Harbour and the islands of Ireland's Eye (nearest) and Lambay Island in the distance

- Howth railway station opened on 30 May 1847, is a two-platform terminal station served by the Dublin Area Rapid Transit.
- The Hill of Howth Tramway ran around the peninsula between Howth station, the summit and Sutton station until 1959.
- Small boats run to Ireland's Eye in the summer months. The boats are located at the end of the West Pier. Ireland's Eye is used and has a reputation as a spot for birdwatching.
- Dublin Bus runs the H3 service to Howth Summit via Howth village. The new 6 bus route, which started taking effect in 2020, takes an almost identical route to the H3; however, it does not stop at Howth Summit, but Terminates at Howth DART station
- Howth is also home to the National Transport Museum of Ireland which houses public service and road transport vehicles.

== See also ==
- List of abbeys and priories in Ireland (County Dublin)
- List of towns and villages in Ireland
- List of RNLI stations
- Howth Head
- Ben of Howth
- Hill of Howth Tramway
