= IWCA (disambiguation) =

IWCA may refer to:

- Independent Working Class Association, a left-wing political party in Britain
- International Wing Chun Academy, a martial arts school in Australia
- Irish Women's Citizens Association, a non-governmental organisation in Ireland
