= James Bayley Butler =

Irish biologist and academic

- Born: 8 April 1884; Secunderabad, India
- Died: 21 February 1964 (aged 79); Dublin
- Education: Royal University of Ireland
- Known for: Expert on dry rot
- Scientific career
- Fields: Zoology, botany
- Workplaces: University College Dublin

James Bayley Butler MBE MRIA (8 April 1884 – 21 February 1964) was an Irish biologist and academic, and was considered the foremost expert on the fungus which causes dry rot.

== Life ==
James Bayley Butler was born in Secunderabad, India, on 8 April 1884. Along with three sisters, he was the only son of Col. James William Butler and Henrietta Butler (née Bayley). Col. Butler was an administrator with the East India Company. Upon the family's return from India, Butler was educated at St George's College, Weybridge, Surrey, Clongowes Wood College, County Kildare, and St Mary's College, Rathmines, Dublin. He then went on to the Catholic University of Ireland medical school, graduating with a BA in science in 1905 and an MB in medicine in 1909 from the Royal University of Ireland. During his time as a student, Butler was appointed dissector in anatomy to Professor Ambrose Bermingham. He also appears to have studied abroad at this time, in Bonn, Bergen, Naples and Canada.

Butler built his own home called Glenlion at Baily, Howth, County Dublin over a period of 30 years. It was built to his own design as a replica of a classical Roman villa. The building at its surrounds feature a roof garden, floral sundial, and moondial. He incorporated stone which was salvaged from the Custom House and the Four Courts following their partial destruction in the 1920s, as well as fragments from original Butt Bridge, the Roman Forum, and the Baths of Caracalla. Butler would open the gardens at the house every year to raise money for the Jubilee Nurses' Fund.

Butler married Katherine McWeeney on 19 December 1906, with whom he had two daughters, Katherine Butler and Beatrice Dixon. After his first wife died, Butler remarried in 1944 to Alice Dromgoole, a medical social worker. Butler died on 21 February 1964. His family retain a draft of his autobiography, which has been considered for publication in the past.

== Career ==
Upon the establishment of University College Dublin (UCD), Butler was the first lecturer in botany from 1909, assisting George Sigerson, the professor of biology. When the botany lecturership became a professorship in 1911, Butler continued to lecture on zoology, and was appointed professor of zoology upon Sigerson's retirement in 1924. Butler held this position until his own retirement in 1957, apart from a period of service during World War I. During this time Butler served with the Royal Army Medical Corps, beginning as a lieutenant in 1915 and retiring a major after the war. For his service, he was awarded an MBE.

Butler's primary research interest was in applied biology. He carried out research on Catenaria anguillulae, a parasite of the ova of the liver fluke, from 1922 to 1932. Later on, Butler focused on the control of wood-boring beetles and the fungus that causes dry rot in wood Serpula lacrymans. On this matter, he became an international expert, and assisted in the development of the company Biotox, which manufactured insecticides and fungicides for use in the construction industry. He consulted on the dry rot that was discovered during the reconstruction of UCD's Newman House, and was called upon as an expert witness in Irish and English courts in relation to this expertise. Butler also developed a process for waterproofing maps, the patent of which he sold to the United States Army during World War II.

He was a promoter of fieldwork at UCD, organising trips to the Dublin Mountains, Glendalough and The Burren. The first UCD marine field station at Coal Harbour, Dún Laoghaire, and later at Coliemore Harbour, Dalkey, was initiated by Butler and continued by a former student of his, Carmel Humphries. Butler founded the UCD Natural History Club, which later became the Biological Society of UCD, and served as its first president. In 1962 he presented a cup to the Society to be awarded annually to the best student paper, which was later renamed the Bayley Butler trophy. He was an active member of the Royal Dublin Society, serving as a council member from 1903, and vice-president in 1954, and assisted in the RDS science and technical exhibitions during the 1930s. He was a council member and honorary vice-president of the Zoological Society of Ireland. Butler was elected a member of the Royal Irish Academy in 1915, serving on the council three time, and also on the Flora and Fauna committee.

== Glenlion ==
Butler is known for constructing a complex series of concrete and stone steps, pathways and diving boards on a headland known as Lions Head within Doldrum Bay on the south face of Howth Head, County Dublin, between Drumleck, Censure and the Baily (site of the Baily Lighthouse). The remains of these structures can still be seen and partially used as of 2019, although the area has been somewhat eroded by the elements, as well as partially demolished and cordoned off by Fingal County Council. The area cannot be accessed easily on foot, or at all by car, and cannot be accessed by boat in rough weather, which leads to a significant risk for swimmers who get into difficulty. For these reasons the area has not become as popular as, for example, the Forty Foot, for swimmers or cliff-divers.

Glenlion was later purchased by disgraced solicitor Michael Lynn before being repossessed and sold in 2008.

Well known horticulturalist David Robinson lived in the nearby house Earlscliffe also in the Baily area of Howth on Ceannchor Road.

Irish architect Andrew Devane also lived two doors down from Glenlion in the famous house he designed, Journey's End.
