= Gerry Daly (gardener) =

Irish Horticulturist and media personality

- Born: 1953 (age 72–73); Enniscorthy, County Wexford, Ireland
- Education: University College Dublin (BSc Horticulture, MSc Agricultural Economics)
- Occupations: Horticulturist, garden designer, media personality
- Years active: 1979–present
- Employer(s): RTÉ, BBC Northern Ireland
- Known for: The Irish Garden magazine, Ask About Gardening radio show, Greenfingers TV programme

Gerald "Gerry" Daly (born 1953) is an Irish Horticulturist, garden designer and media personality and editor of The Irish Garden magazine. He has featured, over a period of nearly 40 years, on multiple radio and television programmes on RTÉ and BBC Northern Ireland channels, and has contributed, as he still does, regular columns for Irish newspapers and magazines, over more than 30 years, including the Irish Independent, the Sunday Independent and the Farmers Journal.

== Personal life ==
Daly grew up in Enniscorthy, County Wexford. His father, John Daly, was an agricultural instructor, horticultural advisor and commercial fruit grower, and both his parents were keen gardeners at the family residence at Bohreen Hill, in Enniscorthy. All of his grandparents were farmers.

== Education ==
Daly took a First Class Honours Degree in Horticulture at University College Dublin (UCD) in 1977, and a master's degree in Agricultural Economics at the same institution in 1978.

== Career ==
Daly joined Irish national broadcaster RTÉ as a senior producer in 1979, and designed the Ask About Gardening radio show.

Described by the Irish Independent as "the doyen of Irish gardening experts", and by the Irish Times as the "popular personification of Irish gardening," Daly is one of a small number of popular Irish gardening writers and media figures, along with, for example, Helen Dillon, Dermot O'Neill and Diarmuid Gavin.

In 1989, Daly set up a private garden design consultancy, working from his home in Co. Wicklow. He also launched a nursery producing trees and shrubs.

Daly led the panel on Ask About Gardening, a live "phone-in" questions and answers radio show, from its inception, for over 20 years, and also took listener questions on shows like Marian Finucane's on weekend mornings, and on slots with Keelin Shanley and others.

Daly appeared on RTÉ from 1984 to 1995, leading the Room Outside programme team. From 1991 to 1995, he was also lead presenter of Greenfingers for RTE and BBC Northern Ireland. Both programmes achieved high audience figures. Co-presenters on Greenfingers included horticultural scientist and weed specialist David Robinson and Crosbie Cochrane.

Daly has made many appearances at shows and festivals, from the national horticultural show, Bloom, to the annual Rose Festival at St Anne's Park and a range of local events.

Daly was a co-founder of the Garden and Landscape Designers Association of Ireland, and remains a member.

== Writing ==
In late 1991, Daly co-founded the magazine The Irish Garden with Mary Davies and Nick Maxwell. As of 2018, it is the highest-circulation gardening magazine in Ireland, with a readership estimated at over 60,000. Daly was joint editor with Mary Davies until 2006, before becoming sole editor in 2007. He is also the editor of the associated website, garden.ie, launched in 2001.

Daly is gardening columnist for the Sunday Independent, for more than thirty years, as well as the Evening Herald and the leading agricultural newspaper, the Farmers Journal.

== Books ==
- Gerry Daly's Garden Book, 1986 (new edition with added material, 1992)
- Children's Gardening Book, Gerry Daly, 1988
- Gerry Daly's Garden Style, 1990
- A Gardening Year, 1992
