= Greenfingers (TV programme) =

Greenfingers is a 1990s Irish television programme about gardening. It was produced by Fast Forward Productions for RTÉ and BBC Northern Ireland. It was presented by gardeners, horticulturalists and garden designers Gerry Daly, David Robinson, Crosbie Cochrane, Trevor Edwards, Helen Mark, and Finola Reid. The presenters would visit gardens throughout the Island of Ireland.
