= Sutton Park School =

Independent second-level school in Dublin, Ireland

Coordinates: 53.376466°N 6.093427°W

- St. Fintan's Road, Dublin; Ireland

Information
- Type: Private
- Opened: 1957
- Head of school: Ronan Walsh
- Gender: Co-educational
- Colours: Yellow & Navy (Sportswear); White, Red and Navy (Uniform)
- Website: suttonparkschool.com

Sutton Park School is a non-denominational, private co-educational day school located just off Saint Fintan's Road in Sutton at the city side of Howth Head on the Northside of Dublin, Ireland.

== History ==
Sutton Park School was founded in 1957 as one of the first multi-denominational schools in Ireland.

One of the founders was Rosaleen Mills who was an Irish activist and educator. She served here as vice-principal for some years.

The original school building is a late Georgian House known as St Fintan's House whose previous owners had sold it on. Captain John King is recorded as living at the house from 1849-53.

Since 2016, it no longer offers boarding facilities. Sutton Park is an international day school, with students from ages 4 to 19 attending from 22 countries. It is accredited by the Council of International Schools.

== Notable alumni ==
- Donal Skehan
- Duncan Campbell (artist)

== Sources ==
- A guide to Sutton Park by John Davis.
