= David Robinson (horticulturist) =

Irish horticultural scientist (1928–2004)

David W Robinson
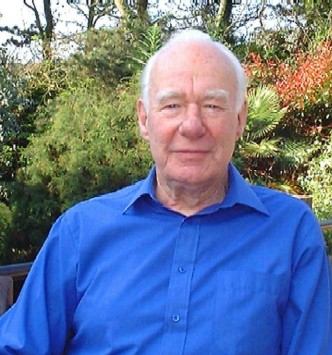
- David Robinson in 2003
- Born: 2 April 1928; Belfast, Northern Ireland, UK
- Died: 28 March 2004 (aged 75); Dublin, Ireland
- Education: Reading University; Cornell University; Queen's University Belfast
- Known for: Studies in weed control, horticultural knowledge
- Awards: Gold Veitch Memorial Medal (Royal Horticultural Society); Fellowship and Distinguished Horticulturist Award (Institute of Horticulture); Institute of Horticulture's Hall of Fame; Fellow of the American Society for Horticultural Science.
- Scientific career
- Fields: Horticultural Scientist
- Workplaces: Ministry of Agriculture, Northern Ireland; Horticultural Centre, Loughgall, Northern Ireland; Kinsealy Research Centre / Agricultural Institute, Dublin
- Website: www.earlscliffe.com

David Willis Robinson (2 April 1928 – 28 March 2004) was a Northern Irish horticultural scientist who made contributions to the national and international fields of horticulture and agriculture, with more than 120 publications. After a working life in research, in retirement he became a journalist and television/radio presenter and a leader of gardening tours. He cultivated and managed the Earlscliffe Gardens at the Baily, Howth, County Dublin, Ireland.

== Early life and education ==
Born in 1928, Robinson said later that he decided on a career in horticulture at the age of 10. His father was a building contractor.

Robinson obtained his bachelor's degree in horticulture from Reading University. Some years later he pursued a master's degree in pomology from Cornell University (USA) and then a doctorate from Queen's University Belfast, with a focus on weed science. He gained practical early experience on a fruit farm near Pershore and a vegetable farm at Musselburgh, East Lothian, Scotland.

== Career ==
Robinson worked as a horticultural adviser for the Ministry of Agriculture (1950–53), in County Down. In 1953 he was appointed deputy director at the newly established Horticulture Research Centre in Loughgall, County Armagh. His first major job was to help clean up the weed problem in fruit crops. His research into the many chemical tools that were becoming available at the time established him as an expert in this field. However, he had at the time no training in research methods or statistical analysis and felt that he was in a job for which he was inadequately trained, but he acted to change this. As Robinson later wrote, "I knew early in 1954 that the well endowed W.K. Kellogg Foundation was giving grants to people in Britain to provide further training in the USA for agricultural graduates. I happened to be in London in March 1954 and by pure chance I passed by the headquarters of the Foundation. I still don't know what gave me the courage but I walked in, asked to see the Director (without an appointment) and told him I wanted a Kellogg Foundation Grant to study at Cornell University in New York State for a year. At the time I worked for the Ministry of Agriculture in Northern Ireland, a most bureaucratic organisation, and when I returned all hell was let loose for the Ministry felt (understandably) that they and they alone should decide who would benefit from Kellogg grants. Anyway I was released for a year and spent 1954/55 in the States where I learned a great deal about research and plants. The US had not suffered from the War the way Europe had and it was an exhilarating time." Having been introduced to his future wife by a friend in 1953, they married in 1955.

Robinson continued to work at the Horticultural Centre in Loughgall until 1964.

Robinson had been invited down south to the Republic of Ireland on a number of occasions to give advice. For example, John Daly, agricultural instructor and later father of the RTÉ gardening expert Gerry Daly, had invited him several times, starting in 1959, to come and lecture to the fruit growers in County Wexford on his research into weed control. As a result of these trips he was offered in October 1963 a post as Director of Horticultural Research at the Kinsealy Research Centre, a facility of the Agricultural Research Institute (now a Teagasc facility), at Kinsealy north of Dublin, Ireland. He had won a Fulbright Grant to spend some further time in the US, but despite this and ongoing projects, he eventually accepted the offer, taking up the new post in May 1964, moving to live in Ard na Mara, Malahide.

Robinson remained in the Kinsealy post for almost 25 years (1964–88). His work included projects on commercial production of soft fruits among others, at centres of the Agricultural Research Institute at Ballygagin and Clonroche, and work on his no-hoe / no-till technique of low-maintenance cultivation.

Robinson represented Ireland on the Council of the International Society for Horticultural Science from 1964 to 1990, and was President of the Horticultural Education Association of Great Britain and Ireland from 1971 to 1972.

=== Earlscliffe House and Garden ===
The Robinsons bought Earlscliffe House and gardens at the Baily, Howth, just outside Dublin, in 1969. Robinson's 7-acre (28,000 m^{2}) garden there, maintained with minimal outside help, has been designated one of Ireland's National Plant Heritage Gardens and was awarded the highest accolade (two stars) in the 1999 Good Gardens Guide (Ebury Press). It benefits from a sheltered location with a warm microclimate, and plants growing there include bananas, tree ferns, South African Erica and a range of palms, all flourishing outside without any winter protection. At times it was available for garden tours by groups. Robinson also supported some research interests on a private basis from the garden, for example sending foliage of New Zealand-originated plants to a New Zealand entomologist in France, who was testing attraction for certain garden pests, such as the fall web worm and an Asian moth.

Several notable individuals have lived at or owned Earslcliffe including;

- Captain William Bunbury McClintock Bunbury (1864–1878)
- Sir John Pentland Mahaffy (1901–1922)
- Very Rev. CT Ovenden and Dr Ella Webb MBE (1922 -1930)
- Sir John Lumsden (1930 -1945)
- Augusta, Lady Gregory (1949–1950)
- Arthur Stanley-Clarke (1950 -1952)
- Dr Robert Rowan Woods (1952 -1961)

=== Media, journalism and public appearances ===
Robinson was a regular panel member on the Irish RTÉ Radio One Ask About Gardening show led by Gerry Daly, answering impromptu gardening questions phoned in by listeners. For a four-year period, he was also a presenter on the Green Fingers television programme, which was transmitted by BBC Northern Ireland, and RTÉ. He wrote on gardening topics for a number of Irish and UK newspapers, journals and magazines, including Ireland's most-read agricultural newspaper, the Farmers Journal, and the top-selling gardening magazine, The Irish Garden.

== Publications and editorial work ==
Robinson was the author of over 120 scientific publications, mainly on weed control, and joint editor of three books on horticultural science.

Robinson was on the editorial board of Scientia Horticulturae (1970–89), Associate Editor of Crops Research Journal (1982–89) and on the editorial board of Chronica Horticulturae (1992–95).

== Recognition ==
Robinson's work in horticulture was recognised by the Gold Veitch Memorial Medal from the Royal Horticultural Society, Honorary Life Membership of the Royal Dublin Society and of the International Society for Horticultural Science. He was given Fellowship and the Distinguished Horticulturist Award from the Institute of Horticulture, and in 1996 was elected to the institute's Hall of Fame. He was also elected a Fellow by the American Society for Horticultural Science, the highest award offered by that Society.

== Death and legacy ==
Robinson died in March 2004 and was survived by his wife, Muriel (1929–2016), daughter Karen, son Ivan and their families. In 2005, the year after his death, the Annual College Lecture for students of horticulture in Ireland, organised and sponsored by Bord Bia, was renamed as the David Robinson Memorial Lecture in his honour, and continues to be given annually under that name.

== See also ==
- James Bayley Butler – botanist who lived at Glenlion also in Baily area of Howth
