= Beatrice Dixon =

Irish pioneer of women's participation in public life (1916–2005)

- Born: Beatrice Maureen Butler; 17 August 1916; Dublin, Ireland
- Died: 16 March 2005 (aged 88); Dublin, Ireland
- Known for: first female juror to serve in Ireland

Beatrice Dixon (17 August 1916 – 16 March 2005) was an Irish pioneer of women's participation in public life, and served as the first woman juror in Ireland.

== Family and early life ==
Beatrice Dixon was born Beatrice Butler in Dublin on 17 August 1916. She was the younger of the two daughters of James Bayley Butler and Katherine Butler (née McWeeney). Her older sister was Sister Katherine Butler. Her maternal uncle was Edmund J. McWeeney, a professor in pathology in University College Dublin (UCD). Dixon was educated at Alexandra School, Dublin and then the Ursuline convent, Waterford. After school, she worked in her father's manufacturing company, Biotox. She went to England in 1944, joining the Women's Auxiliary Air Force and worked as a meteorological observer in North Devon and Wiltshire. After World War II, she moved to London for two years and served as a prison visitor in Holloway women's prison.

She married meteorologist Frederick E. Dixon, historian and founding pillar of the Irish Meteorological Service (Met Éireann), on 19 April 1950. They had one daughter, Margery, and lived in Terenure.

== Campaign work ==
Like many women of her generation, Dixon did not work outside the home, but was active in a number of voluntary organisations with a particular interest in expanding the range of activities women could engage with by right. She was a prominent member of the Irish Housewives Association, serving as chair from 1954-1955, and was selected as their candidate for the 1957 general election in Dublin South West. She was eliminated after the seventh count.

Along with Kathleen Swanton, Dixon applied in 1954 for women to be volunteered on jury lists. Under the Juries Act of 1927, women who owned property could qualify and be liable for jury service, but were treated as exempt and would have to volunteer to serve. After making many application, these women's names were added to the list in 1955, but only after Dixon campaigning for years was she summoned, and even longer before she served. She was called on several occasions, but was turned down in the courtroom. She claimed that authorities thought women would be upset by some cases due to violence or sexual matters involved, and stated that the lack of women's toilet facilities in court buildings was a barrier for women's inclusion. Her contention was that the civil and legal rights of men and women were infringed by women not being allowed to serve on juries. It is believed that she was the first woman in Ireland to serve on a jury, during two high court cases in July 1957.

The IHA continued to advocate for greater involvement of women in public life, convening a "women's dáil" at a Dublin hotel on 12 November 1972. The dáil brought together 180 prominent women, with Dixon selected as the "ceann comhairle". This alternative dáil discussed ways of improving women's status and social condition, but didn't have much influence on future legislation.

Dixon was also active in the Girl Guides, serving in a number of roles, including area commissioner. She was engaged in local history, publishing a number of papers on the history of Dublin, and was a member of the Old Dublin Society for over 50 years, serving on its committee. She was a keen gardener, and taught gardening courses. Along with her husband, Dixon was a frequent correspondent to the letters page of The Irish Times.

Dixon died on 16 March 2005 in Dublin, and her body was donated to the medical school in UCD.
