= Ben of Howth =

Hilly area on Howth Head near Dublin, Ireland

Coordinates: 53.37319°N 6.07002°W

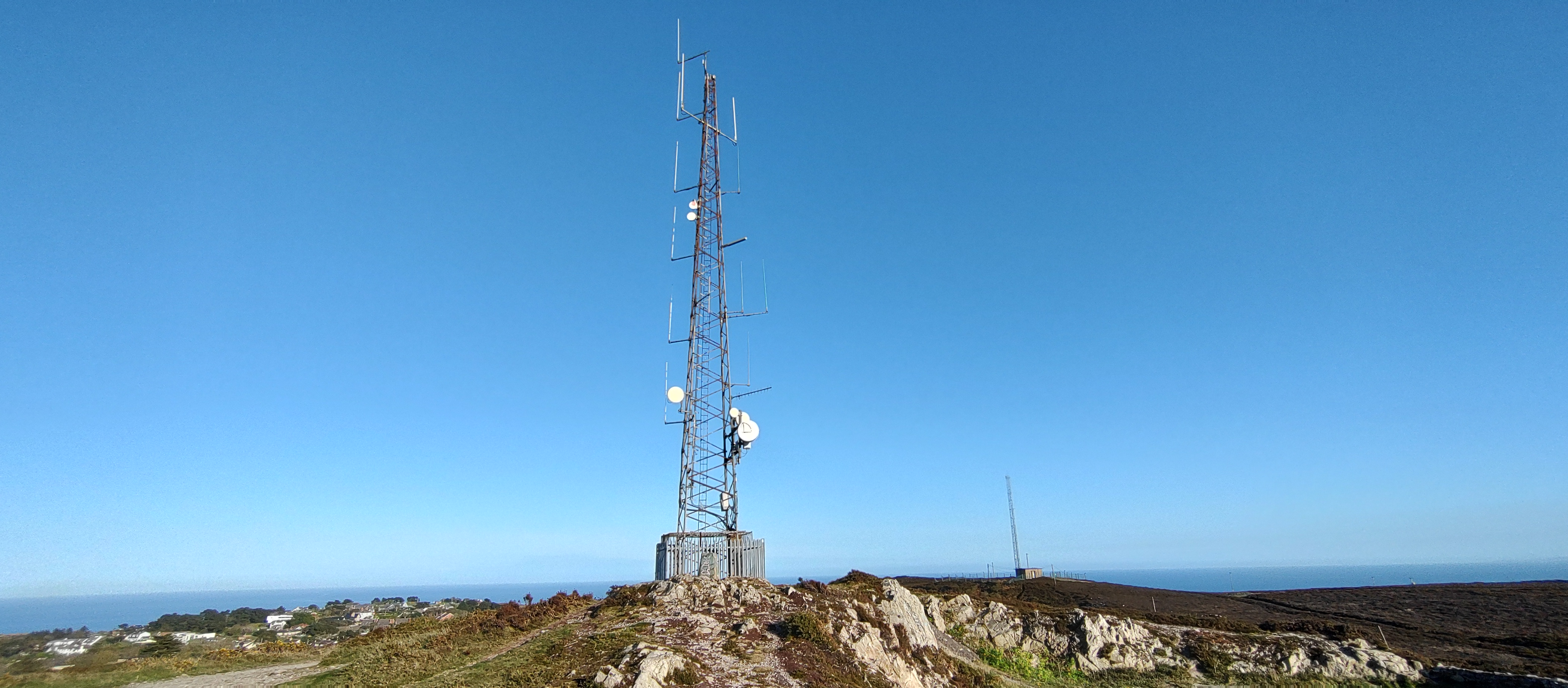
- Ben of Howth Radio Mast

Highest point
- Elevation: 171 m (561 ft)
- Prominence: 167 m (548 ft)
- Listing: Marilyn

Naming
- Native name: Beann Éadair

Geography
- Location within island of Ireland
- Location: County Dublin, Ireland
- OSI/OSNI grid: O285376
- Topo map: OSi Discovery 50

The Ben of Howth (/ˈhoʊθ/ HOHTH; Irish: Beann Éadair ) is a hilly area on Howth Head, adjacent to the 171 metre high Black Linn, the peninsula's highest point.

== Geography ==
Lying approximately 1½ km to the south of Howth village, the nearest road is Windgate Road, from which a path leads west past Green Hollows quarry.

Two of Howth's other peaks are nearby, Shelmartin or Shielmartin which lies approximately 1 km to the west, and Dun Hill, 0.5 km to the north west.

== Gallery ==
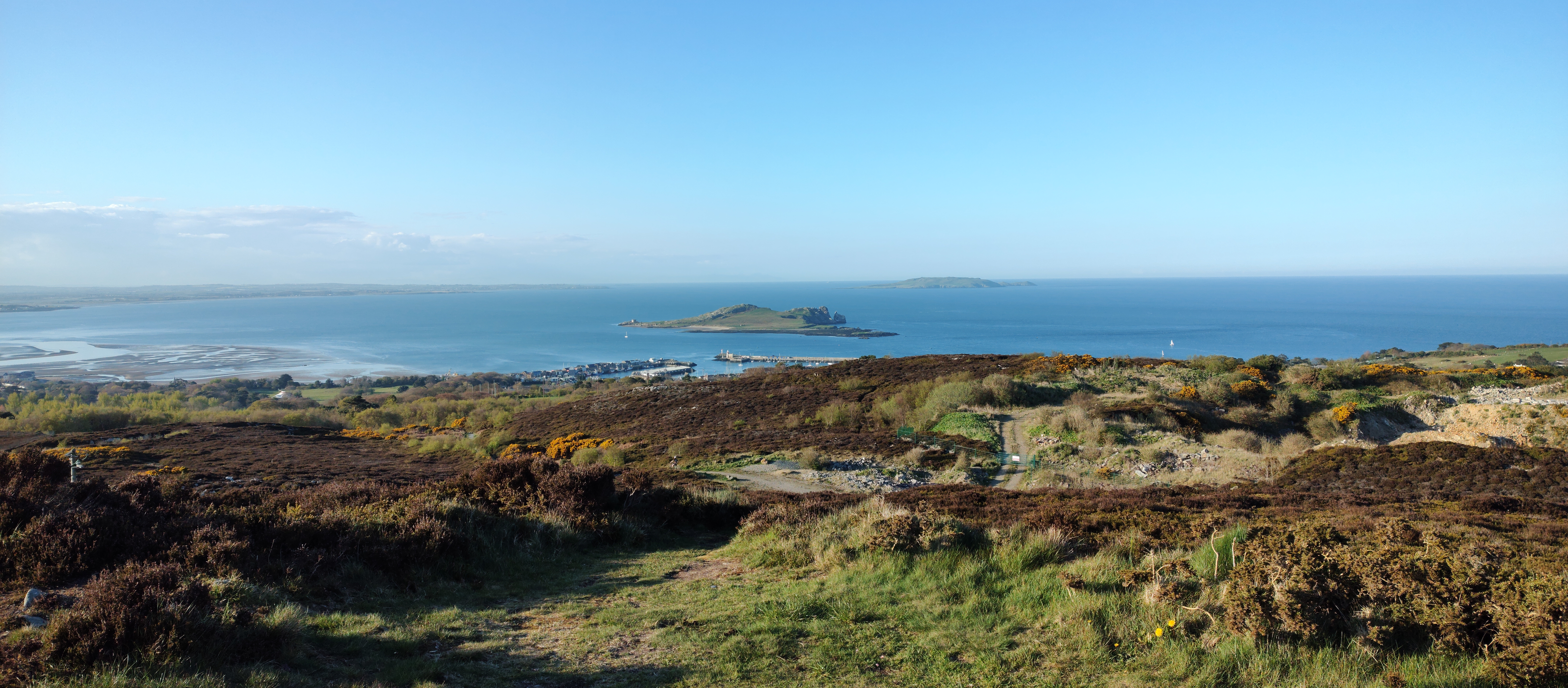
North-facing view

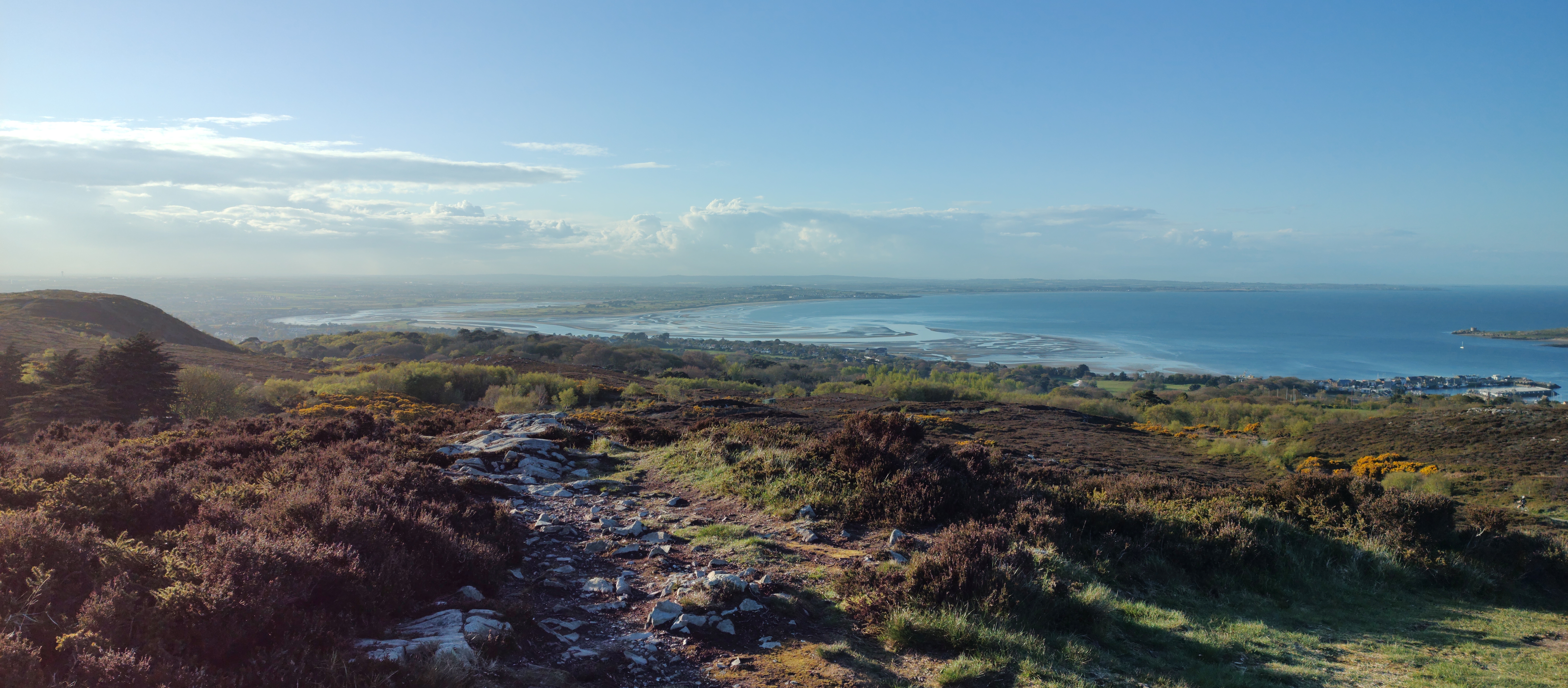
Northwest facing view

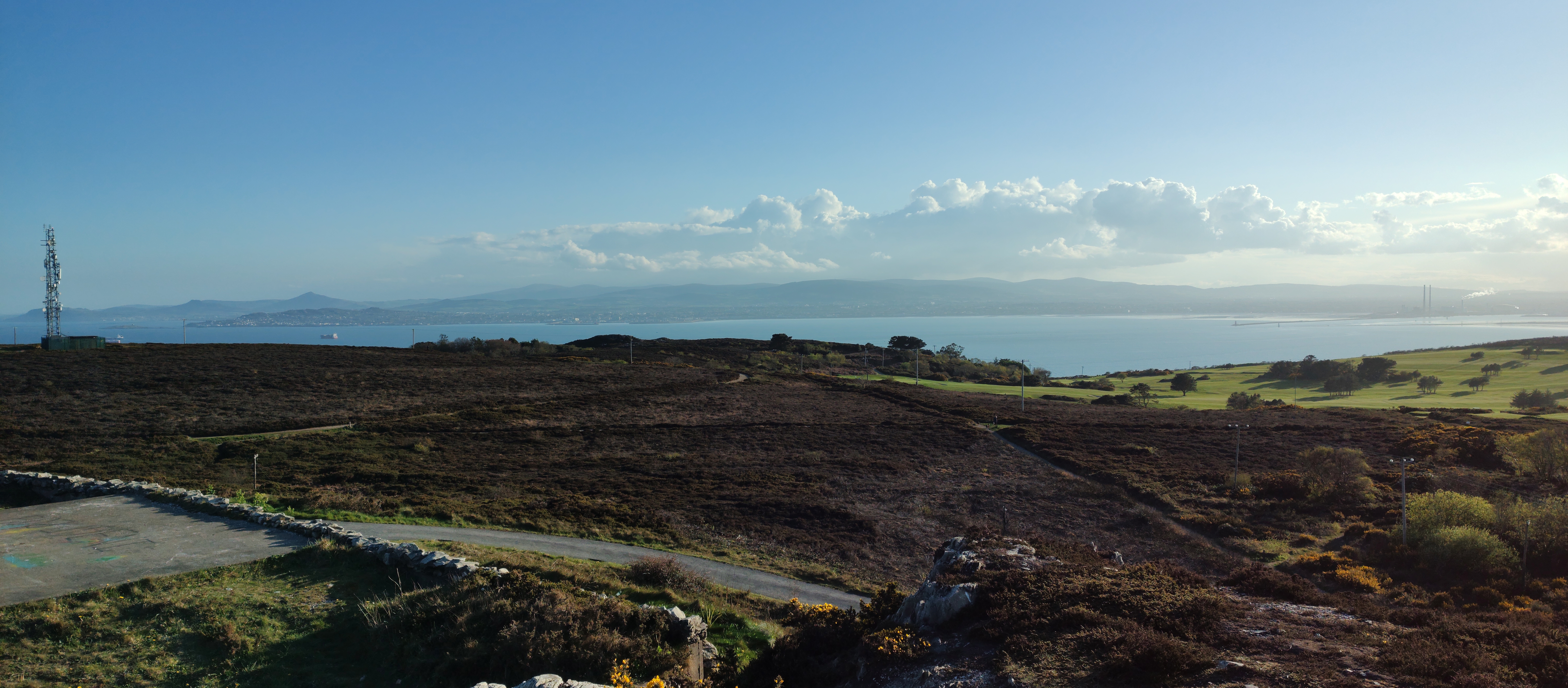
Ben of Howth, southwest facing view

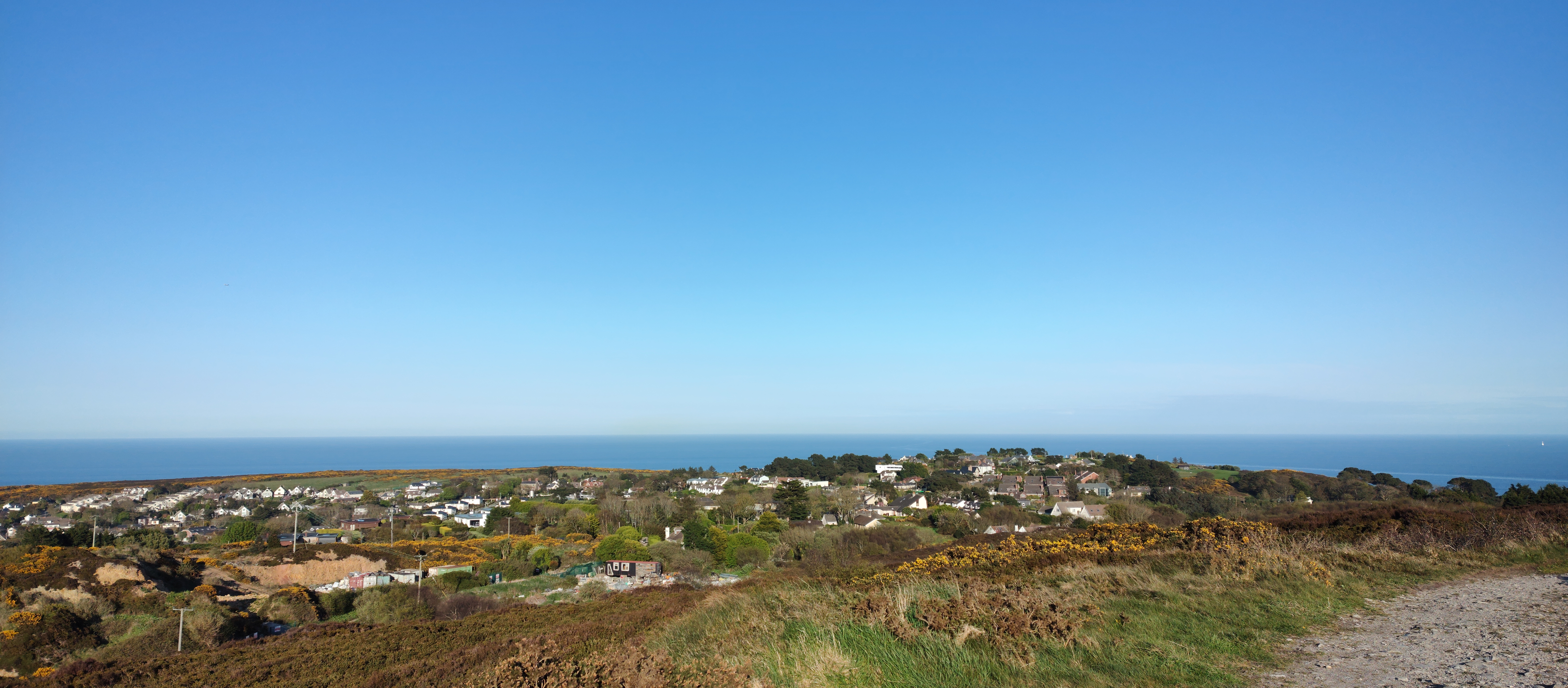
Ben of Howth, east view
