= Ye Olde Hurdy Gurdy Museum of Vintage Radio =

Museum in Howth, Dublin

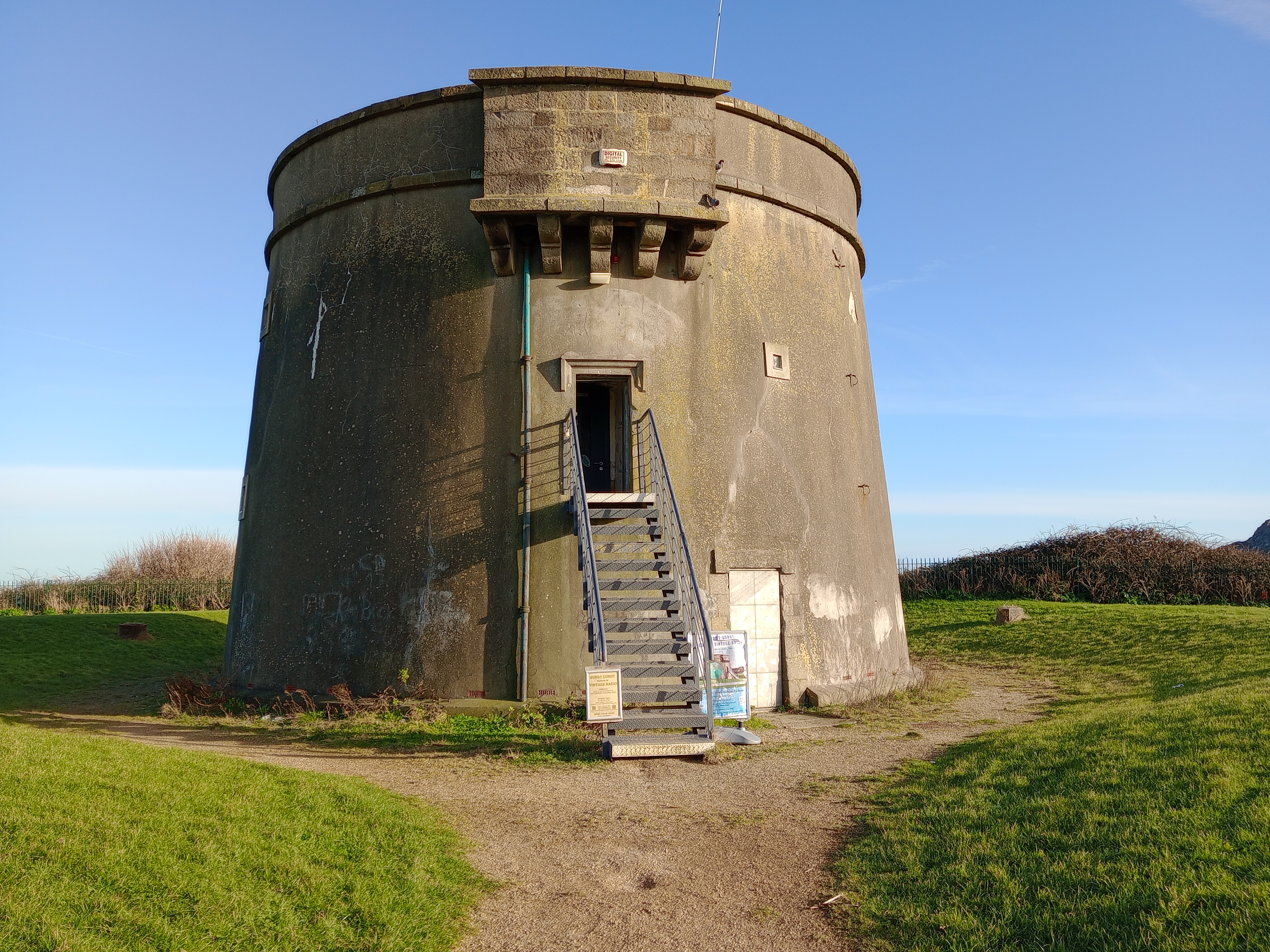
- The Ye Olde Hurdy Gurdy Museum of Vintage Radio viewed from the front

- Location within Dublin
- Established: 2003
- Location: Howth, Ireland
- Coordinates: 53.387668°N 6.063654°W
- Type: communication history
- Curator: Pat Herbert
- Public transit access: Howth railway station St Laurence Road bus stop (Dublin Bus route 31)
- Website: sites.google.com/site/hurdygurdymuseum/home, hurdygurdyradiomuseum.wordpress.com

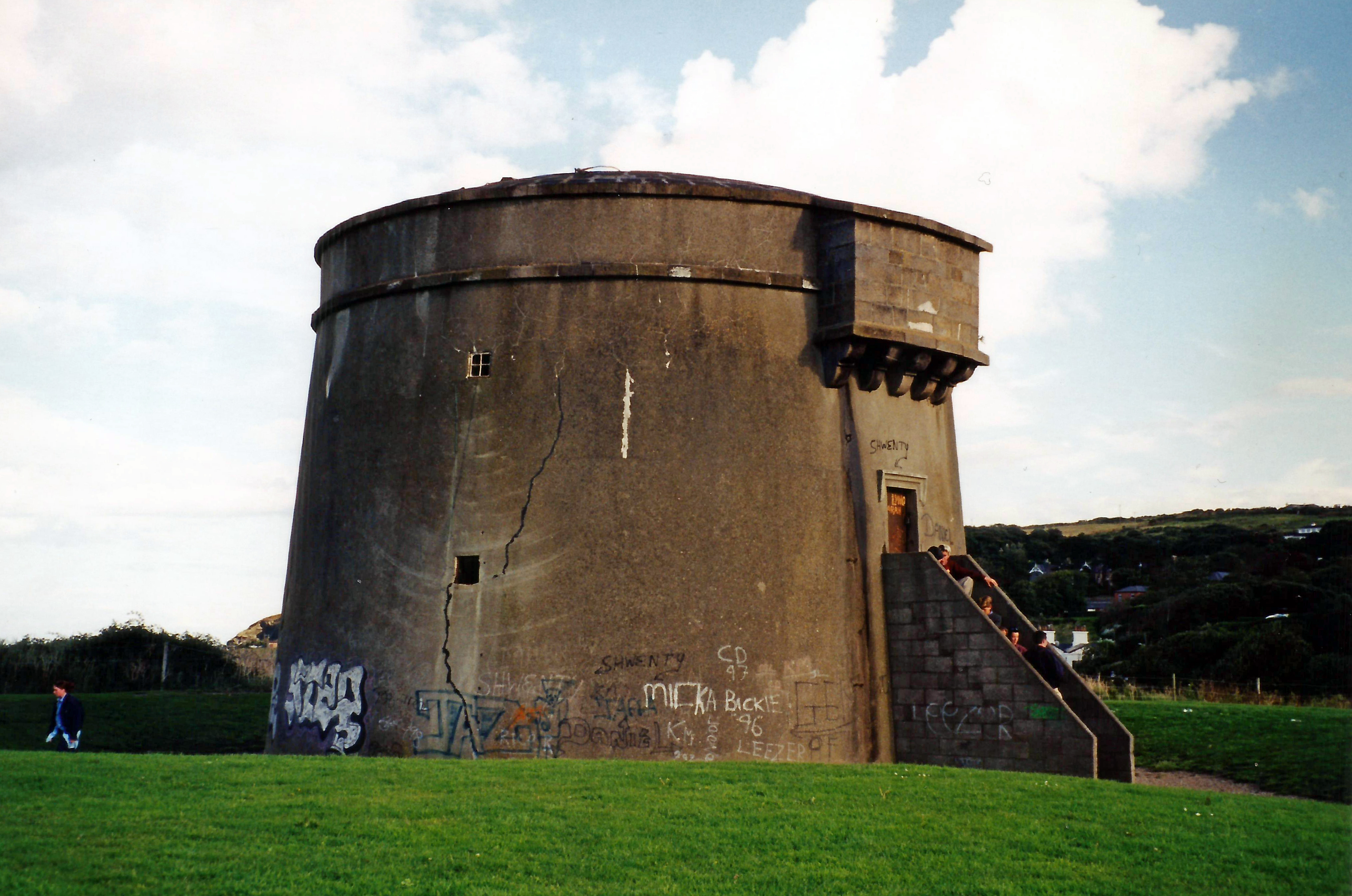
Howth Martello Tower before the establishment of the museum

Ye Olde Hurdy Gurdy Museum of Vintage Radio is a museum of communication history based in the Martello tower in Howth, Dublin.

== Tower history ==
The tower was built in 1805, one of the many towers built along the Irish coast to guard against a possible Napoleonic invasion, and has long been associated with the history of radio transmission in Ireland and beyond. From 1825, the tower was used by the Preventative Water Guard (now the Irish Coast Guard) in its anti-smuggling work.

The tower was the terminus of the first telegraph line connecting Wales to Ireland in 1852. The first successful wireless radio transmission by Lee de Forest on 23 November 1903 was also conducted from this tower. Guglielmo Marconi demonstrated his technology using a high aerial to communicate with a ship in 1905. From 1922, the tower was used by the Minister for Posts and Telegraphs, then Telecom Éireann until the 1980s when it was sold to Dublin City Council. It passed to Dublin County Council and then to Fingal County Council, who still own it, as of 2020.

== Museum ==
The tower was refurbished in 2001, with the museum opening in 2003. It is based around the collections of former curator Pat Herbert who had been collecting for over 60 years. The name of the museum is an homage to a remark by Taoiseach Seán Lemass, who asked an RTÉ radio controller in the 1950s "How's the hurdy gurdy?".

The exhibition includes artefacts relating to all forms of communication and related Irish historical events, including radios, early televisions, gramophones, and records. The story of curator Pat Herbert and the museum was the subject of a 10-minute award-winning film in 2014, Hurdy Gurdy Man. The museum was operated by Herbert and a team of fellow volunteers up to the COVID-19 pandemic, when, as with all museums in Ireland, it closed. Herbert died in June 2020, and the museum's website was updated by his fellow volunteers.

The Morse code-based amateur radio station, EI0MAR, operates from the museum.
