= Katherine Butler =

Irish nun

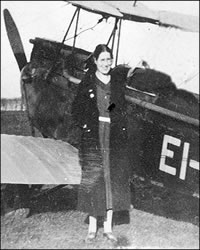
- Born: Katherine Bayley Butler; 27 May 1914; Dublin
- Died: 8 August 2000 (aged 86); Crumlin, Dublin
- Education: Alexandra College, Dublin; Ursuline convent, Waterford; University College Dublin
- Occupation: Nun
- Known for: Third woman in Ireland to receive a pilot's licence
- Notable work: A Candle Was Lit (1953)

Sister Katherine Butler (27 May 1914 – 8 August 2000) was an Irish nun with the Religious Sisters of Charity, teacher, writer, and aviator. Butler was one of the first women to get a pilot's license in Ireland.

== Early life ==
Born Katherine Bayley Butler, she was the eldest of two daughters of James Bayley Butler and Katherine Butler (née McWeeney). Both she and her sister Beatrice attended Alexandra College, Dublin, and later the Ursuline convent, Waterford. Butler had decided to take up a religious vocation from age 17, but was persuaded to wait until she was 21 by her parents. She used this time to undertake a degree in science at University College Dublin.

== Aviation ==
Butler had become interested in aviation after seeing Sir Alan Cobham's Air Circus in the early 1930s, and so began to take flying lessons at Kildonan Aerodrome, with pilots such as John Currie. On 15 January 1936 she became the third woman in Ireland to receive a pilot's licence. She entered the novitiate of the Sisters of Charity in Milltown, Dublin five days later, on 20 January. She was given the name Sr Mary Alphonsus, though later reverted to Katherine Butler, remarking that "there were no nuns with double-barrel names."

== Educational career and later life ==
Having finished her novitiate, Butler graduated as a teacher in 1938 and spent many years in the profession. Butler spent time in England teaching during World War II, and later studied in Rome in the late 1960s. Butler taught at the order's secondary school in Mountjoy Street, Dublin, later helping to found new secondary schools in Foxford, County Mayo, serving as principal, and Walkinstown, Dublin. She last taught in the order's Marymount school in Harold's Cross, before moving to the order's Crumlin convent in 1977. Whilst in Crumlin, Butler began an outreach programme, conducting home visits with her pupils.

In 1953 she published a biography of Mother Mary Aikenhead, foundress of the Sisters of Charity, A Candle Was Lit. Following this publication, Butler referred to the "apostolate of the pen" and wrote a prodigious number of letters to lonely people, prisoners, and occasionally to the national newspapers. She also wrote for magazines and periodicals, with a particular interest in the area of ecumenism. This interest led her to attend services of other denominations including Jewish, Quakers, and The Salvation Army. Butler was an active member of the Old Dublin Society, and wrote for their journal the Dublin Historical Record, winning the Society's annual award for best paper three times.

Butler died on 8 August 2000 in Crumlin. She attained special permission from her order to donate her body to the Royal College of Surgeons for use in medical research.
