= Hilda Tweedy =

Irish women's rights activist

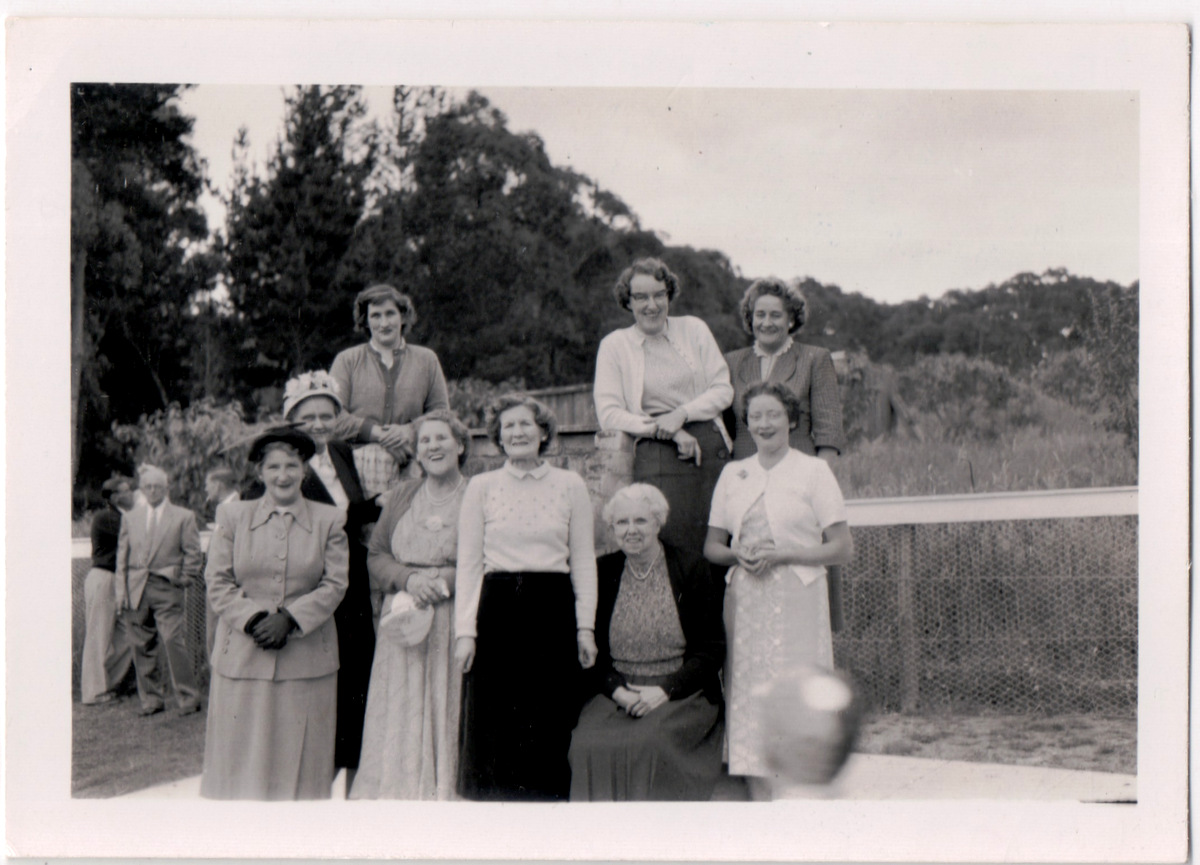
Second row: Far left: Hilda Tweedy

Hilda Tweedy, née Anderson (1911–2005) was an Irish women's rights activist. A founding member and leader of the Irish Housewives' Association (IHA), she was active for decades advocating for the rights of women on a diverse number of issues including equal pay, girls' education, recycling, the marriage bar (an Irish law that required a woman employed in the civil service to resign her position when she married), the right of women to serve on juries, and other issues. In 1973, she became the first chairperson of the Council for the Status of Women.

== Life ==
Hilda Anderson was born in Clones, County Monaghan on 26 August 1911. She was the eldest of three girls born to Rev. James Ferguson Anderson and Muriel Frances Victoria Swayne. She was educated at Alexandra College. After leaving school, she joined her parents in Egypt. From 1929 to 1936, she lived in Egypt, starting a PNEU school in Alexandria, and reading for an external mathematics degree from the University of London.

In 1936, she married Robert Tweedy in Egypt, and returned to Dublin.

Tweedy was refused a job as a teacher on the grounds that if she became pregnant it would be unpleasant for her students. With the onset of World War II, she resolved to tackle the effects of wartime food shortages on children. Her efforts with four other women resulted in the Housewives Petition of 1941, out of which grew the Irish Housewives Committee in 1942, which became the IHA in 1946. Under Tweedy's leadership the IHA incorporated the Irish Women's Citizens Association in 1947, a group founded to lobby for reform of the 1937 Constitution of Ireland which defined (Article 41.2) women as home-makers. The merger "strengthened our feminist convictions" explained Tweedy. The work of the IHA expanded from just consumer rights to advocating for political rights. The organization fought for accessible nutritious food, public health, social welfare, and education for all. She was the official Irish delegate to the United Nations World Conference on Women in 1975. In 1992, she published A Link in the Chain: The Story of the Irish Housewives Association 1942–1992.

In 2003, she donated her papers to the National Archives of Ireland.
