= Irish Women's Citizens Association =

Irish non-governmental organisation

The Irish Women's Citizens Association was an influential non-governmental organisation created in 1923 to advocate for women's rights in the aftermath of the Irish War of Independence and the Irish Civil War. Originally known as the Irish Women's Citizens' and Local Government Association, it was the result of a merger between the Irish Women's Suffrage and Local Government Association and the Irish Women's Association of Citizenship. The aim of the new society was to “bring together all Irishwomen of all politics and all creeds for the study and practice of good citizenship”. Members of the Irish Women's Citizens Association were usually urban, middle class women who were educated. Many of them were feminists who had been involved in the suffrage movement as members of the Irish Women's Suffrage and Local Government Association that stayed involved with activism after suffrage was achieved. They believed all women were full citizens, and they worked to protect their rights as citizens. The association was active for three decades and advocated on key laws passed by the Irish Free State in its first decades of independence. In 1949 the IWCA merged with the Irish Housewives Association.

== Campaigns ==
=== Civil Service Regulation Bill ===
In 1925 the association began a successful campaign against the Civil Service Regulation (Amendment) Bill. This law would have prohibited women from advancing into the higher ranks of the civil service. A 1926 statement by the organisation explained their opposition: "In the view of the women’s organisations, the question is one of principle. To them, the test for appointment to any office should be the fitness of the candidate to discharge the duties of that office – the question asked should be, not are these candidates men or women, but are they competent to do the work." The Irish Women's Citizens Association worked with other feminist groups, and through the use of letters to the editor and a circular sent to the Dail, the Civil Service Regulation bill was suspended. Due to the advocacy of the Irish Women's Citizens Association the Irish Senate rejected the bill.

=== Civil Service Amendment Act and Juries Bill ===
The group was involved in other significant campaigns. In 1927 the government proposed the Civil Service Amendment Act and the Juries Bill which exempted women from jury duty. The association argued against the Juries Act on the grounds that as citizens, women had a right to participate in public life, and that women would be beneficial to the legal system as jurors. The association joined with other groups to protest this law. They wrote letters to the editor and to all the members of the Dail. However, they were unsuccessful and women were excluded from jury duty by default.

=== Irish Criminal Law Amendment Act ===
In 1934, the organisation called for the elimination of section 17 of the Irish Criminal Law Amendment Act which prohibited the sale of contraceptives. The group was unsuccessful and the sale of contraceptives in Ireland remained outlawed until the end of the century.
