= Irish Housewives Association =

The Irish Housewives Association (IHA) was an influential pressure group founded in 1942 to speak out about injustices and the needs of Irish women, inside and outside the home. The organization continued until 1992, when it dissolved itself.

== History ==
The IHA was founded by Hilda Tweedy along with Andrée Sheehy Skeffington, Susan Manning, and Louie Bennett. The group organized a 'Housewives Petition' sent to the Government before Budget Day in 1941. Later that year over 600 additional signatures were collected. Initially known as the Irish Housewives Committee, the group was formed at a meeting on 12 May 1942. They initially campaigned for school meals, free travel for pensioners, and consumer protection. In 1946 the organization renamed itself Irish Housewives Association.

In 1947, the IHA affiliated to the International Alliance of Women. Members of IHA, Beatrice Dixon and Kathleen Swanton began a campaign to have women serve on juries in Ireland. In 1957, Dixon went on to become the first women to serve on a jury.

From 1954 until the early 1960s, the IHA was infiltrated and investigated by Archbishop John Charles McQuaid's Vigilance Committee for communist activity.

In 1968, the IHA played a leading role in the setting up of the Council for the Status of Women (now the National Women's Council of Ireland).

In 1992 the IHA dissolved itself.
