= Rosslare Harbour =

Village in County Wexford, Ireland

Rosslare Harbour Irish: Cuan Ros Láir Ballygeary
- Village
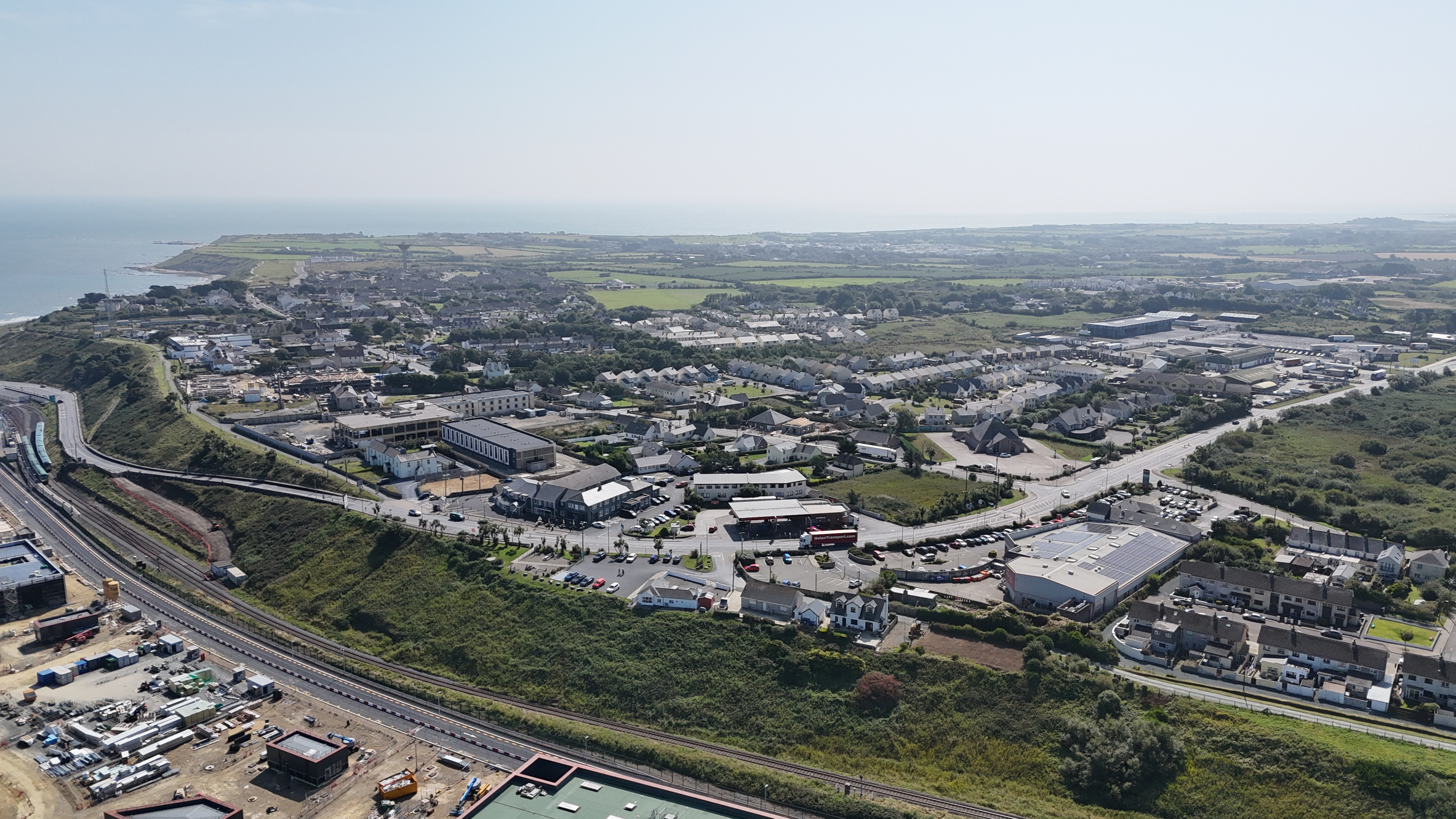
- Rosslare Harbour skyline

- Location in Ireland
- Coordinates: 52°15′05″N 6°20′29″W
- Country: Ireland
- Elevation: 20 m (66 ft)

Population (2022)
  - Total: 2,247
- Time zone: UTC+0 (WET)
  - Summer (DST): UTC-1 (IST (WEST))
- Irish Grid Reference: T136124

The village of Rosslare Harbour (Irish: Calafort Ros Láir), also known as Ballygeary, grew up to serve the needs of the harbour of the same name (now called Rosslare Europort), first developed in 1906 by the Great Western Railway and the Great Southern and Western Railway to accommodate steamferry traffic between Great Britain and Ireland. This port also serves France and Spain, traffic is mainly roll-on roll-off (RoRo). Rosslare Harbour railway station opened on 30 August 1906.

== Village ==
Although the harbour itself is located close to, and for census purposes is co-terminous with, the village of Ballygeary, and within the townland of Ballygillane Big, it was named after the village of Rosslare, some 4 km away (8 km by road) along the coast. The village of Ballygeary was divided into two townlands, one known as "tin town" and the other as "straw town" or "bamboo town". It is believed this was because of the roofs on the houses.

The village has a number of guesthouses, hotels, a Roman Catholic church, a post office and some shops, one of which being a Daybreak service station and is regarded as "the heart and soul of Rosslare Harbour" by locals. Just south of the harbour is a small strand leading to Greenore Point, where grey seals can sometimes be seen. The harbour is home to an RNLI lifeboat station.

The population of Rosslare Harbour reached 2,247 at the 2022 census, increasing 87% from 2016 and becoming one of the fastest-growing urban areas in the country.

== Railways and ferries ==
Services provided by Irish Rail on the Dublin-Rosslare railway line from Rosslare Europort railway station to major places such as Wexford O'Hanrahan, Enniscorthy, Arklow, Wicklow, Greystones, Bray Daly to Dublin Connolly.

From Dublin Connolly onward rail connections via the Sligo Line links with Longford and Sligo and the Belfast Line links with Drogheda MacBride, Dundalk Clarke, Newry, Portadown and Belfast Grand Central.

Preceding station	Iarnród Éireann	Following station
Rosslare Strand	Intercity; Dublin-Rosslare Line	Terminus
	Ferry services	
Terminus	Stena Line; Ferry	Fishguard
Terminus	Stena Line; Ferry	Cherbourg
Terminus	Irish Ferries; Ferry	Pembroke Dock
Terminus	Brittany Ferries; Ferry	Cherbourg
Terminus	Brittany Ferries; Ferry	Le Havre
Terminus	Brittany Ferries; Ferry	Bilbao
	Disused railways	
Rosslare Strand	Intercity; Limerick-Rosslare Line	Terminus

== Bus transport ==
Rosslare Harbour and Rosslare Europort are served by Bus Éireann routes 132, 370, 379 and Local Link route 387. The main routes serving Rosslare Harbour is Route 387 to Wexford several times daily. Local route 370 replaces the rail service to Waterford and runs twice a day each way (except Sundays) serving locations in South County Wexford previously served by the railway; Bridgetown, Wellingtonbridge and Campile. Expressway route 2 used to link the Harbour with Dublin Airport every hour but was withdrawn in September 2012. There is now only one through bus a week to Dublin – route 132 departing Rosslare Europort on Thursday mornings. It runs cross-country via Carnew. Expressway route 40 used to link the Harbour with Waterford and New Ross but this service was cut in May 2026.

== See also ==
- List of towns and villages in Ireland
- Rosslare Harbour Lifeboat Station
