= Rosslare Europort =

Port in Rosslare Harbour, County Wexford, Ireland

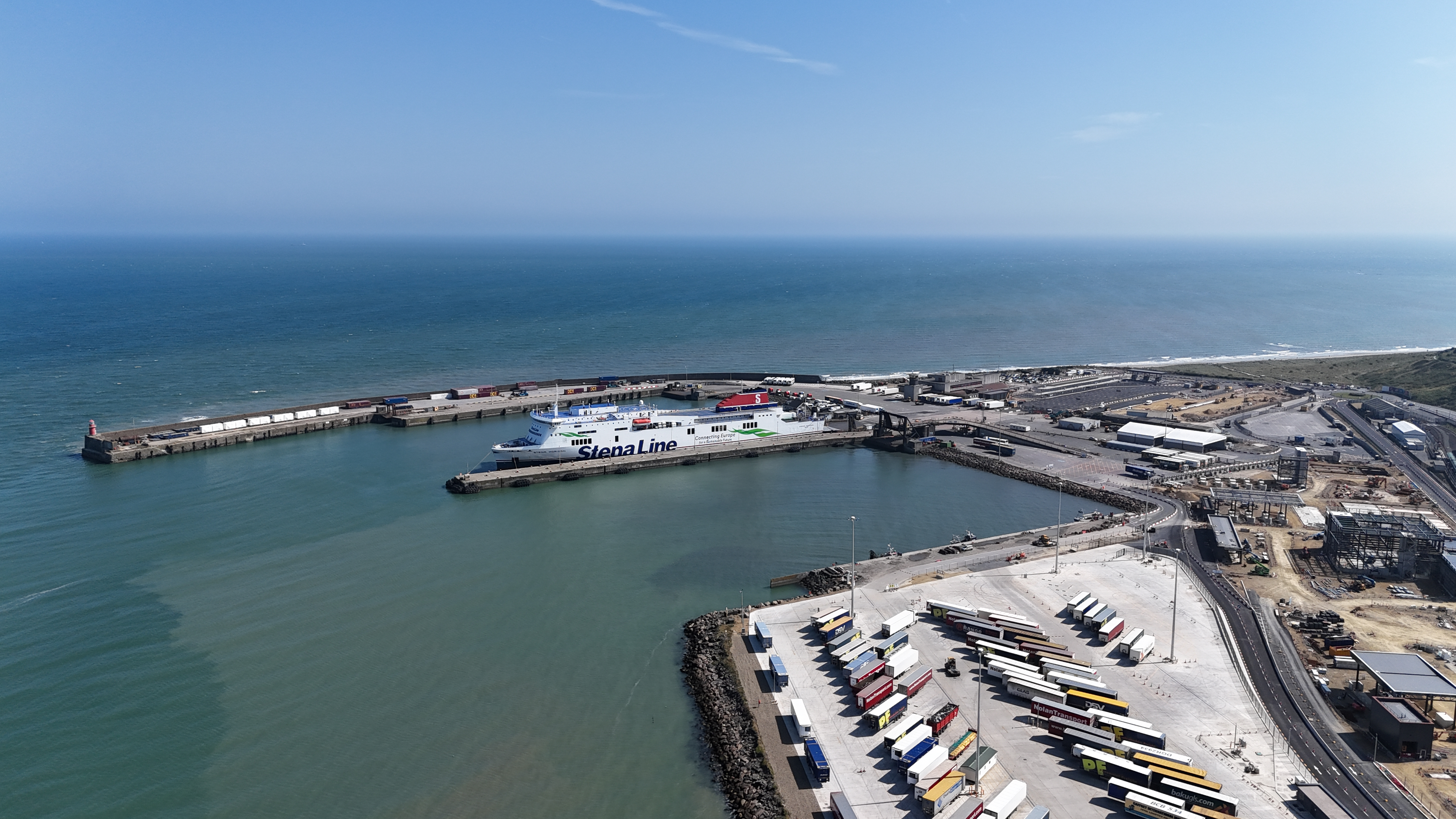
- Rosslare Europort
- Interactive map of Rosslare Europort
- Location within Ireland

Location
- Country: Ireland
- Coordinates: 52°15′20″N 6°20′04″W
- UN/LOCODE: IEROS

Details
- Operated by: Iarnród Éireann
- Type of Harbor: coastal breakwater port
- No. of berths: 5
- Draft depth: 7.2 m.
- General Manager: Glenn Carr

Statistics
- Website; Official website

Rosslare Europort (Irish: Eorafort Ros Láir) is a modern seaport located at Rosslare Harbour in County Wexford, Ireland, near the south eastern most point of the island of Ireland. It is the primary Irish port serving the European Continent with 36 direct services to the Continent weekly. It handles passenger and freight ferries to and from Cherbourg, Dunkirk, St Malo and Roscoff, in France, Bilbao in Spain and Fishguard and Pembroke Dock in the United Kingdom. Since July 2022, a new freight route between Rosslare and Zeebrugge, Belgium was introduced by Finnlines (Grimaldi Group) for a twice weekly ro-ro service between the two ports.

As a result of Brexit, the port is expanding rapidly, providing new or increased direct sailings with extra capacity from Ireland to mainland Europe. The direct routes between Ireland and the continent allow freight transport firms to bypass the UK land bridge, in case there is severe congestion at British ports.

The port, formerly called Rosslare Harbour, is operated by Iarnród Éireann, Ireland's national railway operator. Wexford politicians Verona Murphy and James Browne maintain that if Rosslare is to take advantage of its new market opportunities and undergo radical expansion to handle container traffic, this will require large-scale investment.

Rosslare Europort has direct sailings into Cherbourg, Dunkirk, St Malo/Roscoff and Bilbao ports. As a result of new routes or increased frequency and capacity on existing routes, there are 36 direct services (freight and passenger) to and from Rosslare to continental Europe weekly, a six-fold increase on the 3 weekly sailings to mainland Europe in 2019. The Dunkirk route is a key selling point as it is three hours from Paris and just 20 minutes from the Belgian border. According to Glenn Carr, Europort General Manager, the Dunkirk route is quicker than using the British landbridge taking account of the paperwork and customs checks caused by Brexit.

== Current services ==
Ferry services
Ferry company	Destination	Notes
Irish Ferries	Pembroke Dock	
Brittany Ferries	Cherbourg	
Brittany Ferries	Bilbao	
Brittany Ferries	Santander	November to March
DFDS Seaways	Dunkirk	
Finnlines	Zeebrugge	Freight only
Stena Line	Fishguard	

The port predominantly handles RORO (roll-on/roll-off) cargo ships and ROPAX (roll-on/roll-off) passenger and freight vessels. The harbour has four cargo berths and a fishing vessel berth. Passenger ferries operate to and from Fishguard (Stena Line) and Pembroke Dock (Irish Ferries) in Wales, and to Cherbourg (Stena Line and Brittany Ferries) in France. Brittany Ferries also operate from Rosslare to Bilbao in Spain. DFDS operates a freight-only service from Rosslare to Dunkirk with six sailings a week in each direction, On 4 March 2021, DFDS announced that the Dunkirk-Rosslare freight-only service would be increased to eight times a week from 1 April 2021. In February 2021, Brittany Ferries announced additional (freight-only) sailings one-way only from Roscoff to Rosslare Europort and from Rosslare to St Malo. From 7 April 2021, Irish Ferries is introducing a new twice-daily ship on the Rosslare–Pembroke route, which will be the fastest RORO vessel between Ireland and the UK (4 hours 01 minute), with capacity for 1,500 passengers, 100 freight vehicles and 700 cars depending on freight volume. From July 2022, a new freight route between Rosslare and Zeebrugge, Belgium was introduced by Finnlines, part of the Grimaldi Group, for a twice weekly ro-ro service between the two ports.

Rosslare Europort has a Border Inspection Post since 2019, crucial for the importation of agri-food, fish or live animal products. It is the only one in Ireland outside Dublin Port. It is currently based in a 16-acre site 2 km from the port. Uniquely for Ireland, the new Border Inspection Post will offer a one-stop service for hauliers, as all necessary checks will be conducted on the same site (customs, agricultural and health inspections), so inspectors come to the hauliers rather than vice versa, saving them time and money.

An advantage for Rosslare is that direct sailings allow drivers to take their rest periods during the crossing, rather than when they land in France or Spain. It appears that there is substantial demand from industry (manufacturers and producers) to use direct sailings to avoid the practical difficulties of using the landbridge such as documentation, redtape, inspections, and the need to use several IT systems. The same holds true for French business intent on avoiding Brexit-related delays and formalities by using the direct routes.

In March 2020 Brittany Ferries commenced the Rosslare-Bilbao service which runs twice weekly, this effectively replaced their Cork Santander service. Brittany Ferries also offer a seasonal service with Roscoff/St Malo in France.

Neptune lines include Rosslare in a loop service which includes Santander, Bristol, Le Havre, Southampton and Zeebrugge, which is used to import motor vehicles.

== Facilities ==
Existing facilities in the terminal building include a cafe with shop, ferry company desks, car rental, and self-service left-luggage lockers. A viewing balcony and foot passenger lounge are to be found on the first floor. Railway services to Wexford, Wicklow and Dublin Connolly are located at Rosslare Europort railway station around a seven-minute walk in the open air along a specially marked path. Bus services to Wexford, and Waterford leave from just outside. Bus and rail connections to Cork, County Kerry, and Limerick, and bus connections to County Clare and Galway are available from Waterford whereas connections to Dublin are available at Wexford.

== Port details ==
At Rosslare, Iarnród Éireann is an infrastructure provider and operator, providing port facilities and related services, including stevedoring, to shipping lines. Rosslare Europort is operated as a Common User Terminal, meaning that the port authority carries out all stevedoring activities on a common user basis for all shipping lines using the port.

The import and export of motor vehicles (trade cars) is one of the most important trades of the port. In excess of 25,000 vehicles are handled per annum. The importer depot is in Rosslare Harbour Village.

The port can accommodate cruise liners. Rosslare Europort was included in the 2020 schedule of the Phoenix Reisen-owned liner MS Deutschland.

An all-weather RNLI lifeboat is on station, and the Irish Coast Guard helicopter at Waterford Airport provides air-sea rescue cover. An automatic weather station is maintained adjacent to the port by Met Éireann.

The port area is largely on reclaimed land. Reclamation work continued to the late 1990s when the northwest part of the port was constructed using a dragline. Modernisation of facilities has continued to encourage the increase in cars carried on the ferries despite a drop in foot passengers.

Rosslare has also handled rolltrailer traffic in the recent past, when Cobelfret operated a service from Rosslare to Zeebrugge/Rotterdam (October 2008 to September 2009). Rolltrailers enable the carriage of lift-on lift-off (LoLo) traffic on roll-on roll-off (RoRo) ships.

Rosslare Europort is the second most strategically important seaport in the state after Dublin. It is the second-busiest port in terms of ship visits and gross tonnage, and handles more unitised freight than any other Irish seaport except Dublin – in fact, Rosslare handles more unitised freight than all other seaports in the state, excluding Dublin, put together. Unitised freight is important because all of the high added-value exports on which Ireland's economic recovery depends are exported as unitised freight.

Rosslare Europort 2020 yearly figures are as follows: 810,000 passengers, 130,000 freight units and 515,710 tonnes of freight.

== SailRail ==
The Rosslare Europort ferry connection using Stena Line to Fishguard Harbour and then by train operated by Transport for Wales to Carmarthen, Swansea and Cardiff links into Great Western Railway services to Bristol Parkway, Reading and London Paddington. This is popular with Rugby fans going to the Millennium Stadium in Cardiff or the Aviva Stadium in Dublin. Train and ferry connections across the Irish Sea are promoted as an alternative to air.

== Irish Rail and ferry connections ==
Trains connect the port on the Rosslare Line via Wexford, Enniscorthy, Gorey, Arklow, Wicklow, Bray to Dublin Connolly. Connecting routes from Dublin Connolly include the Sligo Line and the Belfast Line.

Preceding station	IÉ	Following station
Rosslare Strand	InterCity; Dublin-Rosslare Line	Terminus
	Ferry services	
Terminus	Stena Line; Ferry	Fishguard; Harbour
Terminus	Irish Ferries; Ferry	Pembroke Dock
Terminus	Brittany Ferries; Ferry	Cherbourg-en-Cotentin
Terminus	Brittany Ferries; Ferry	Santander
Terminus	Brittany Ferries; Ferry	Santurtzi
	Disused railways	
Rosslare Strand	InterCity; Limerick-Rosslare Line	Terminus

== Planned development and investment at Europort ==
The Europort is set to undergo a major transformation over a three to five-year period with new investment of over €30 million invested to provide capacity, facilities and technology to facilitate major growth. There will also be initiatives under the strategic plan for the port including development of the Rosslare Europort Business Park by the Dutch company XELLZ targeting the future Offshore Wind Market and the creation of a Free Zone at Rosslare Europort and the Europort Business Park. It is intended to use technology to create Ireland's smartest digital and automated Port so that the Europort will meet all customs and Brexit requirements for state agencies.

Verona Murphy, former president of the Irish Road Haulage Association and a local TD, believes the port needs a €200m upgrade to take full advantage of the opportunities Brexit provides, as Rosslare is currently a roll-on roll-off port, taking trucks, drivers and trailers, whereas she maintains what is needed is to update to a load-on load-off container-type port, requiring crane infrastructure and significant land reclamation. The Irish government has said it will invest more in ports like Rosslare as businesses seek certainty amidst the confusion caused by Brexit.

The Europort’s Offshore Renewable Energy (ORE) project received a major boost with the announcement of €2.5m in EU funding under the European Union’s Connecting Europe Facility (CEF).

In April 2023, the Irish Government approved a major capital investment programme at Rosslare Europort for the expansion of Terminal 7 at Rosslare including redeveloping the existing site and demolishing many existing buildings to allow for the construction of a new border control post, which will include new buildings and associated external site infrastructure. In total, as of April 2023, €350 million is set to be invested in the Offshore Renewable Energy, the infrastructure plans, the port Masterplan, digitilisation and the N25 Rosslare Europort Access Road.

== Planned road infrastructure: N11/N25 scheme ==
A new motorway costing €350 million is being built linking the N11 at Enniscorthy, along the old N25 road past Wexford town, with the port. The aim is to construct 30 km of road which will link Rosslare Europort/Wexford with Dublin via the M11 motorway and Cork/Waterford via the N25. These routes form part of the European Designated European route E1 and provide a direct link to both mainland Europe and the United Kingdom via Rosslare Europort. The road infrastructure from Oilgate to Rosslare Europort is subject to major delays. In a press release of 8 March 2021, the competent authority stated that it is anticipated that the project could proceed through the statutory planning processes by the end of 2022 at the earliest. Public procurement, possible legal appeals and actual construction will add greatly to this. This could hinder significantly the development of Rosslare Europe, despite the European and national strategic importance of completing this stretch of road.

A very serious question mark has arisen over the ability or willingness of the local authority officials to prioritise and construct the new infrastructure at pace. The option selection process first conducted in 2011 is being repeated in 2021. Lead engineer Sean Dobbs told Wexford County Council at a meeting of March 2021 (the minutes of this meeting were not online as of 20 March 2021) that the preferred scheme option for the M11 motorway would now not be confirmed until 18 June 2021. The further delay was attributed to the increase in remote working.

The delays were criticised on a cross-party basis including by the Cathaoirleach (Chairperson), Cllr Ger Carthy. who accused the Council officials of delay tactics. Mr Dobbs said that the council was trying to predict likely commuter trends due to remote working in 2031, but it is not reported if he stated whether the council had the resources or know-how to carry out such a complex study. However he said that the huge increase in heavy goods vehicles using the current route to Rosslare Euoport was due to increase over the years, but how he arrived at this conclusion has not been reported. Cllr George Lawlor stated that the aim of the N11/N25 project was to assist and foster development of the Europort. Mr Dobbs stated a specialist team was investigating rail infrastructure, due to revived interest in the Waterford to Rosslare railway line, even though this was outside the scope of the N11/N25 project (Cllr Carthy also criticised this new focus). Fianna Fáil Councillor Lisa McDonald raised the issue that the council's delays were unconstitutional and could lead to litigation.

The success of Rosslare Europort is already creating some road congestion in South Wexford and a further increase in traffic without adequate timely infrastructure being put in place could provoke tension.

However given the delays besetting the N11/N25 project, it is very likely that they will be a major factor in creating congestion to and from the Europort and will be a significant hindrance to the success of the Europort and to delivering a boost to the economy of the southeast of Ireland.

== Brexit ==
Rosslare Europort's strategic importance to Ireland for freight transport has increased following Brexit as it offers direct routes from Ireland to continental Europe, offering an alternative to using the UK "landbridge" (a ferry from Ireland to Great Britain, then a drive through Great Britain to an English port before sailing on to the European mainland). In 2020, around 3,000 lorries took the British landbridge route from Ireland to mainland Europe each week.

The importance of the Rosslare direct routes was dramatically highlighted following the confusion and disruption in the southeast of England after France closed its border to freight from the UK on 20 December 2020, leaving up to 250 Irish trucks stranded in Britain trying to access mainland Europe using the landbridge to the continent. Rosslare reduces pressure on Dublin Port by offering direct routes to Europe as an alternative to the British landbridge.

Since then, demand for roll-on, roll-off lorry freight on direct routes from Rosslare to mainland Europe has surged as at least 150,000 lorries cross every year from Ireland to mainland Europe, hitherto mostly via Britain as the cheapest and fastest route before Brexit. An example is the temporary deployment of the new Stena Line Belfast-Liverpool Stena Embla ferry to the Rosslare Cherbourg route.

However some Brexit-related changes are permanent and introduce cumbersome, time-consuming and costly administrative procedures. They do not appear to have easy short-term solutions. Irish logistics companies using the UK Landbridge post-Brexit are facing new frictions affecting cross-border trade as they cross from the UK to the European mainland, just as if they were British, as they must now complete customs declarations and export health certificates that were not required when the UK was a member of the EU.

In addition, Irish companies using the UK landbridge now have to complete Entry Summary Declarations (ENS) and PBN (Pre-Boarding Notification) declarations. Use of the Landbridge route also raises potential problems such as sanitary and phytosanitary inspections, UK export licenses for certain products, rules of origin difficulties, commodity classification code issues, the need to obtain an EORI number and possible UK VAT issues.

Companies using the direct Rosslare routes to the EU are obviously not subject to these onerous, time-consuming procedures which require heavy investment in new IT and trained staff. The complete absence of Brexit-related delays and formalities at Rosslare is of crucial importance. Market forces, and issues such as customs checks and sanitary and phytosanitary checks will determine the future of the UK Landbridge and the comparative attractiveness of Rosslare.

In January 2021 there was a 446 per cent increase in freight volumes on the direct routes to the European mainland compared with the same month in 2020. At the same time, UK freight volumes moving through the port fell by half. Overall freight volumes in January 2021 were 45 per cent higher than in January 2020 as a result of "unprecedented demand" for the new direct services operating between Rosslare and mainland Europe, as transport companies navigate the twin challenges posed by Brexit and the COVID-19 pandemic.

For January and February 2021, UK freight traffic decreased about 43 per cent but overall freight through Rosslare Europort, (both UK and Europe combined) increased by 51 per cent. Figures from the Irish Central Statistics Office show that overall imports from Britain to Ireland fell by more than half in the first two months of 2021 but that Irish exports were not as badly affected; the value of imports from Britain in January and February 2021 was €1.2bn, a decrease of 57% compared to the same period in 2020 while Irish exports to Britain fell by 12% or €249m.

Brexit-related difficulties also affect imports from the UK or from the EU using the UK Landbridge, as was reported to an Irish Senate Brexit Committee hearing. Dublin Port faced Brexit-related issues as regards EU goods coming into Ireland via the UK landbridge.

Despite the huge increase in sailings in 2021, the surge in demand has already showed the need for even more services. This had been predicted just before Brexit by the Irish Road Haulage Assocìation to a hearing of the Oireachtas Joint Committee on Transport, particularly as regards time-sensitive loads such as food but also as regards insufficient capacity generally even with the new services. One user, Amazon, is now routinely sending around 20 trailers on every sailing from Dunkirk to service the Irish market and "to avoid the complications, tariffs, taxes and general headaches that have now become associated with the 'landbridge' between the UK and Ireland". Already the port has instituted a system of standby prebooking due to demand. Glenn Carr, Port General Manager, intends to meet demand by turning the port into a 24-hour facility. He told a RTE interview "We still have availability; we're not 24 hours at the moment. We do intend going 24 hours, we're working with the shipping lines around extra capacity and extra berthing slots being available and we'll certainly be in a position to welcome more sailings into the port going forward."

== Brexit effect on local economy ==
In the Rosslare area, businesses have welcomed the boost in traffic going through the port and the town since Brexit. A local entrepreneur was cited by RTÉ as highlighting beneficial changes such as increased personnel around the area, a big increase in traffic and in people working in Rosslare Harbour, as well as an increase in investment in local business. The BBC has noted that since Brexit, by end February 2021, about 160 new jobs had already been created at Rosslare by government agencies, shipping lines and the port authority itself, and extra business has been generated for local garages and cafes. The Netherlands broadcaster NOS stressed the positive economic effects not only on the immediate Rosslare Port area but also in the wider region.

== Ownership of Europort ==
Rosslare is unique among the commercial ports in Ireland as it operates outside of the Irish Harbours Acts 1996–2009. The port is owned by the Fishguard and Rosslare Railways and Harbours Company which owes its origins to the Fishguard Bay Railway and Pier Act 1893 (56 & 57 Vict. c. xcvii), as amended by the Fishguard and Rosslare Railways and Harbours Act 1894 (57 & 58 Vict. c. cxxxvii), both acts of the UK Parliament, still valid in Ireland. The constituent ports (Rosslare and Fishguard) of the company are nowadays the operational and financial responsibility of Iarnród Éireann and Stena Line Ports Ltd respectively. On account of this historic arrangement, Rosslare Europort is operated as a division of Iarnród Éireann. As it is not a separate corporate entity, it cannot be accurately compared in terms of turnover, overheads and employees to the other port companies. This limits the ability to adequately benchmark its performance.

It has been reported that the Irish Government intends to re-examine the ownership status of Rosslare Europort to see if it can be freed from British ownership as it is believed that the port's complicated ownership structure is a barrier to essential upgrades in the wake of Brexit, and should be fully owned by the Irish State. This follows earlier commitments by another Irish Government minister to raise the issue with the UK Government The issue of ownership was first raised in 2019 by James Browne, a legally qualified local TD, who described the issue as a major factor in the lack of investment in the port but ministers did not follow-up on Browne's intervention. Deputy Browne also suggested that Ianróid Eireann should be divested of management of the Europort with a separate independent management entity. He said that the current arrangements was hindering investment and the development of Rosslare to the advantage of Dublin Port. Deputy Browne compared the huge disparity between investment in Dublin Port as compared to Rosslare Europort, partly due to the ownership issue.

== Rosslare Europort and Dublin Port ==
If the Brexit-induced demand for direct services continues, Rosslare Europort may take at least some business from Dublin Port. Dublin Port is considered by some to be congested, lacks adequate space for parking trucks near the Port, and has not enough available land to have adequate facilities for inspection checks (health, customs, phytosanitary) and for COVID-19, the latter being carried out in a Dublin Airport car-park, over 12 km from Dublin Port. It also may have the potential to capitalize on demand from the more lucrative cruise-liner business, which offers far greater returns compared to traditional freight and passenger ferries, and would be more economically attractive both for Dublin Port and for Dublin city.

By contrast Rosslare Europort has a landbank of 100 acres of adjacent land for development, has virtually unlimited parking and its permanent inspection posts will all be located within the Port area itself.

The president of the Irish Road Haulage Association has called for the movement of some of Dublin Port activities to Rosslare. He cited Dublin traffic congestion, time wastage, NOx emissions and Rosslare's geographical position as the closest Irish port to mainland Europe, providing a viable alternative to the UK land bridge.

DFDS CEO Torben Carlsen is quoted as stating that the Rosslare–Dunkirk route needs 40–50,000 freight movements per year to be viable. This is equal to around a third of all movements using the UK landbridge to continental Europe on an annual basis.

Eamon Rothwell, CEO of Irish Continental Group which operates Irish Ferries, has made a case for the continued success of the UK landbridge as it is faster and cheaper than direct sailings. He argues that it has more frequent services, is less prone to cancellations than direct services, and will continue to offer hauliers the flexibility to pick up goods in Britain, all of which in his view means that businesses will favour it. He pointed out that in the context of annual Irish export-import traffic using shipping, of some 2.77 million 40 ft shipping containers every year, 80 per cent is Irish-British trade, while only 11 per cent uses the landbridge to reach continental Europe. He stated that only 9 per cent use direct routes. He also pointed to the greater efficiency permitted by the landbridge, which he described as three times more efficient than a direct service in terms of crossings. He emphasised the need to streamline traffic and inspections between the UK and Ireland post-Brexit. Nevertheless, he stressed that his own business had invested €150 million in direct services to the European Continent.

On 22 March 2021, the Dublin Port Company (DPC), a semi-state company, stated that Dublin Port will reach capacity some time between 2030 and 2040 even with the completion of existing or planned development: a fourth terminal, a new jetty, passenger terminal buildings and a heritage zone which will double the existing port's capacity to 77 million tonnes a year. The DPC is seeking planning permission to develop port lands on the Poolbeg Peninsula and build a new bridge to take port-related traffic off the East Wall Road, the Tom Clarke Bridge and Pigeon House Road. However, the DPC admitted those developments will not be enough to meet future demand. Additional capacity at other existing east coast ports – Rosslare, Drogheda and Waterford – would also be required, the company said, so as Dublin Port approached its ultimate capacity, volumes it could not handle could be accommodated elsewhere.

Eugene Drennan, head of the Irish Road Haulage Association, stated that Dublin Port was already at maximum capacity and suggested that congestion at Dublin could be relieved by Rosslare, Waterford and Cork ports. DPC states that the Dublin port should be open 24/7 and reduce the time trailers and containers spend at port terminals. However, he claimed that requests for longer opening hours had been met with blank refusal by DPC. The time spent by trailers and containers in the port, he believed could be greatly reduced by having all inspections for a shipment carried out in the same location (bringing the inspectors to the freight rather than vice versa, as is currently the case). The DPC invited public consultations by the end of June 2021.

== See also ==
- West Wales Lines
