= Broadway, County Wexford =

Village in County Wexford, Ireland

Broadway Gráinseach Iúir
- Village
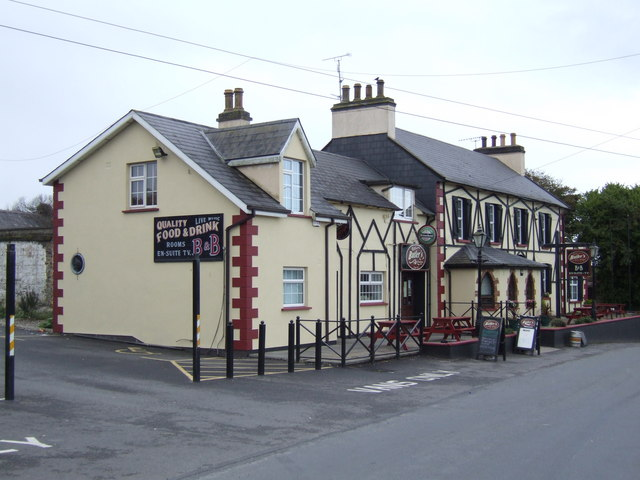
- Butler's pub

- Location in Ireland
- Coordinates: 52°13′09″N 6°23′17″W
- Country: Ireland
- Province: Leinster
- County: Wexford
- Time zone: UTC+0 (WET)
  - Summer (DST): UTC-1 (IST (WEST))
- Area code: 053

Broadway (Irish: Gráinseach Iúir) is a small village in the townland of Grange in southeast County Wexford, Ireland, around 5 kilometres (3 mi) south of Rosslare Strand. The village contains a primary school.

== Transport ==
Bus Éireann route 378 serves Broadway on Fridays only and provides a link to and from Tacumshane and Wexford. Its terminus is at Wexford railway station.

== See also ==
- List of towns and villages in Ireland
