= Wicklow railway station =

Station in County Wicklow, Ireland

Wicklow Cill Mhantáin
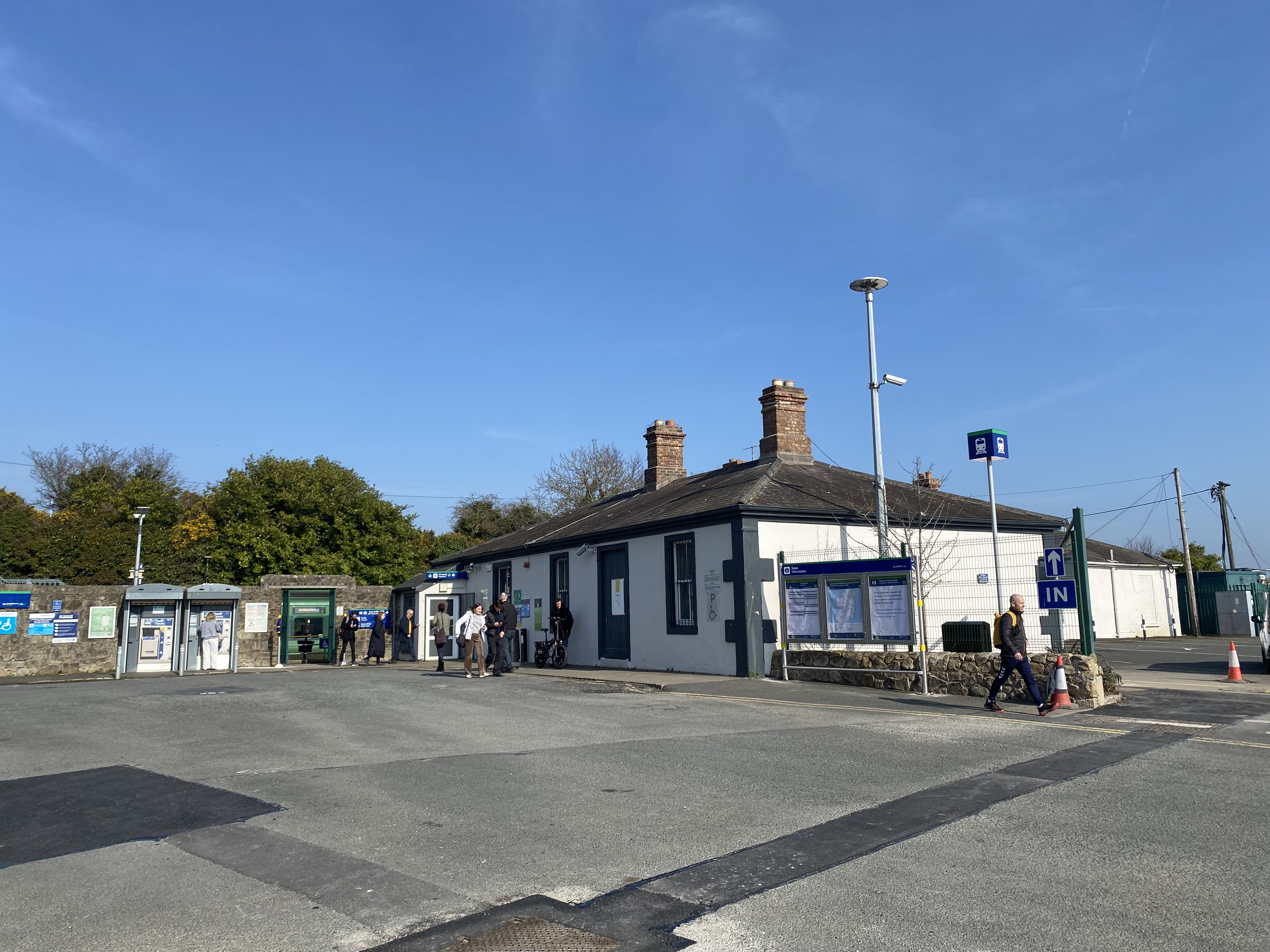
- Wicklow Station in 2025

General information
- Location: Station Road, Wicklow; County Wicklow, A67 TK38; Ireland
- Coordinates: 52°59′17″N 6°3′9″W
- Owner: Iarnród Éireann
- Operator: Iarnród Éireann
- Platforms: 2
- Bus operators: TFI Local Link
- Connections: 183

Construction
- Structure type: At-grade
- Parking: Yes
- Cycle facilities: Yes
- Accessible: Yes

Other information
- Station code: WLOW
- Fare zone: D

History
- Opened: 30 October 1855
- Original company: Dublin, Wicklow and Wexford Railway
- Pre-grouping: Dublin and South Eastern Railway
- Post-grouping: Great Southern Railways
Location

Wicklow railway station (Irish: Stáisiún Chill Mhantáin) is a railway station in Wicklow, County Wicklow, Ireland.

== Facilities ==
The main station building is on platform 1. There are a waiting room and toilets next to the ticket office. An automatic ticket machine is near the ticket office. The waiting room on platform 2 is no longer in use and a covered shelter is provided. The station has a pay and display car park with capacity for 80 vehicles and a bicycle parking area. The station is staffed full-time.

== Description ==
It is a two-platform station with a passing loop. A typical DSER signal cabin is on the footbridge. At the Dublin end, there is a bridge on a curve.

As with other stations on the route between Wicklow and Rosslare Europort, semaphore signalling and ETS operation ceased here in April 2008, with the line now under the control of the mini-CTC system.

== Services/Routes ==
The service from the station is:

Monday to Friday

- 6 trains per day to Dublin Connolly via Bray Daly (one continuing to Dundalk Clarke)
- 4 trains per day to Rosslare Europort via Arklow
- 1 train per day to Wexford O'Hanrahan via Arklow
- 1 train per day to Gorey

Saturdays

- 4 trains per day to Dublin Connolly via Bray Daly (one continuing to Dundalk Clarke)
- 3 trains per day to Rosslare Europort via Arklow

Sundays

- 3 trains per day to Dublin Connolly via Bray Daly
- 3 trains per day to Rosslare Europort via Arklow

Preceding station	Iarnród Éireann	Following station
Kilcoole or Greystones	InterCity; Dublin-Rosslare railway line	Rathdrum
Kilcoole or Greystones	Commuter; South Eastern Commuter	Rathdrum
	Disused railways	
Newcastle; Line open, station closed	Dublin and South Eastern Railway; Dublin-Rosslare	Rathnew; Line open, station closed

== Transport ==
Local Link route 183 commenced in April 2019 and provides a link from the station to Glendalough several times a day.

Bus Eireann route 133, from Wicklow to Dublin Airport, stops at Tesco, which is located 550 m from the station.

== See also ==
- List of railway stations in Ireland
