= Rosslare Europort railway station =

Station in County Wexford, Ireland

Rosslare Europort Eorafort Ros Láir
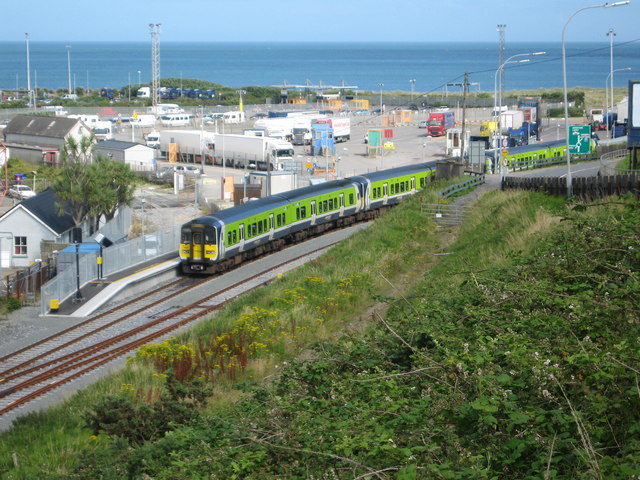
- Rosslare Europort railway station in April 2008 after Irish Rail moved the station to the former turntable sidings.

General information
- Location: Rosslare Europort; County Wexford, Y35 PH4X; Ireland
- Coordinates: 52.2512°N 6.3378°W
- Owner: Iarnród Éireann
- Operator: Iarnród Éireann
- Platforms: 1
- Bus routes: 040, 132, 370, 379, 385, 387
- Bus operators: Bus Éireann, Local Link
- Connections: Stena Line; Irish Ferries; Brittany Ferries

Construction
- Structure type: At-grade
- Accessible: Yes

Other information
- Station code: RLEPT
- Fare zone: M

History
- Opened: 30 August 1906
- Original company: D&SER
- Post-grouping: GSR

Key dates
- 1989: New station building opens
- 2008: Station rebuilt
- 18 September 2010: Services to Waterford cease
Location

Rosslare Europort railway station (Irish: Stáisiún Eorafort Ros Láir) serves Rosslare Harbour in County Wexford, Ireland. The station is owned and operated by Iarnród Éireann and is the southern terminus of the Dublin–Rosslare railway line.

== Description ==
There is only one platform and a runaround loop. There is a turntable, used on occasion by preserved steam locomotives.

The station is staffed but has no ticket office. There is a ticket machine at the entrance to the platform. The single platform is accessible only via a ramp.

Passenger facilities consist of a waiting shelter with seat. There is also a small car park - chargeable.

The station is an eight-minute walk from the ferry terminal in the open air along a specially marked path.

== History ==
The old Rosslare Europort station opened on 30 August 1906 and closed on Monday 14 April 2008. The last service train to depart being the 07:40 to Dublin Connolly, worked by a six-car 2800 Class railcar set.

=== Connection to Waterford ===
Until 18 September 2010 (inclusive) there was also a single daily train each way to and from Waterford. It is now replaced by a revised Bus Éireann Route 370 service via Wellingtonbridge. This bus service and the small number of other bus services from the port depart and arrive at the bus stops in front of the terminal building.

== Services ==
=== Ferry connections ===
==== Overnight ====
The 03:45 ferry arrival from Fishguard has a train connection at 05:35 Monday-Friday (07:20 Saturdays; 09:40 Sundays), and the 18:15 sailing to Fishguard has a connecting train daily arriving at 16:33.

==== Daytime ====
The 16.30 ferry arrival has a daily onward train connection at 17:30 Monday-Friday (17:55 Saturdays; 18:05 Sundays). At present no train connects into the 07.30 sailing to Fishguard.

==== France ====
Several sailings to and from Cherbourg in France can also be conveniently accessed by the rail services to and from Rosslare Europort. The seasonal ferry route to Roscoff in France ceased in September 2018 but reopened by Brittany Ferries in 2020.

=== Train Services ===
There are 4 trains per day (tpd) that connect the port on the Rosslare Line via Wexford, Enniscorthy, Gorey, Arklow, Wicklow, Bray Daly to Dublin Connolly

| Preceding station | IÉ | Following station |
|---|---|---|
| Rosslare Strand | InterCity; Dublin-Rosslare Line | Terminus |
| | Disused railways | |
| Rosslare Strand | InterCity; Limerick-Rosslare Line | Terminus |

== Gallery ==
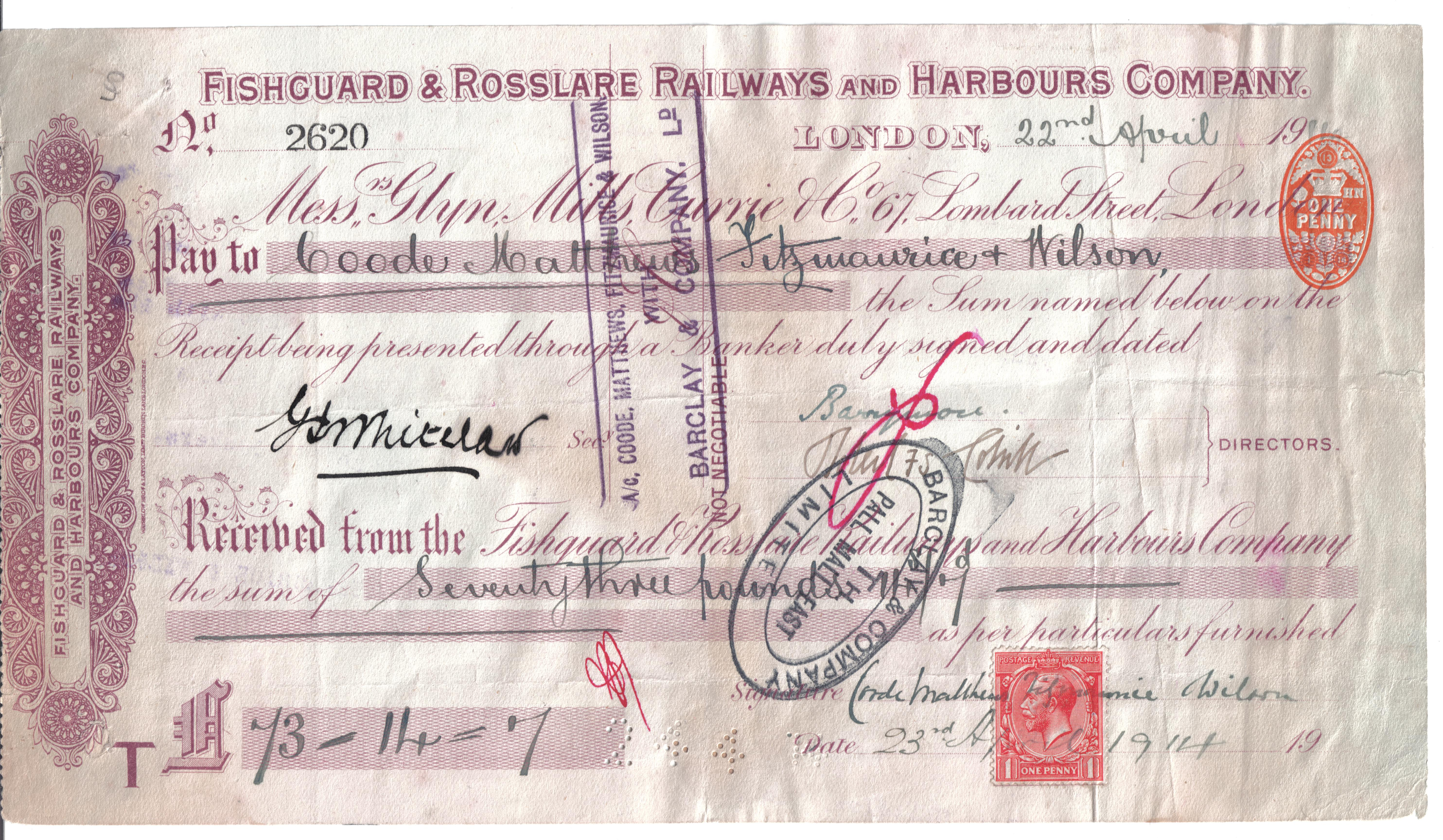
Certificate of the Fishguard and Rosslare Railways and Harbours Company

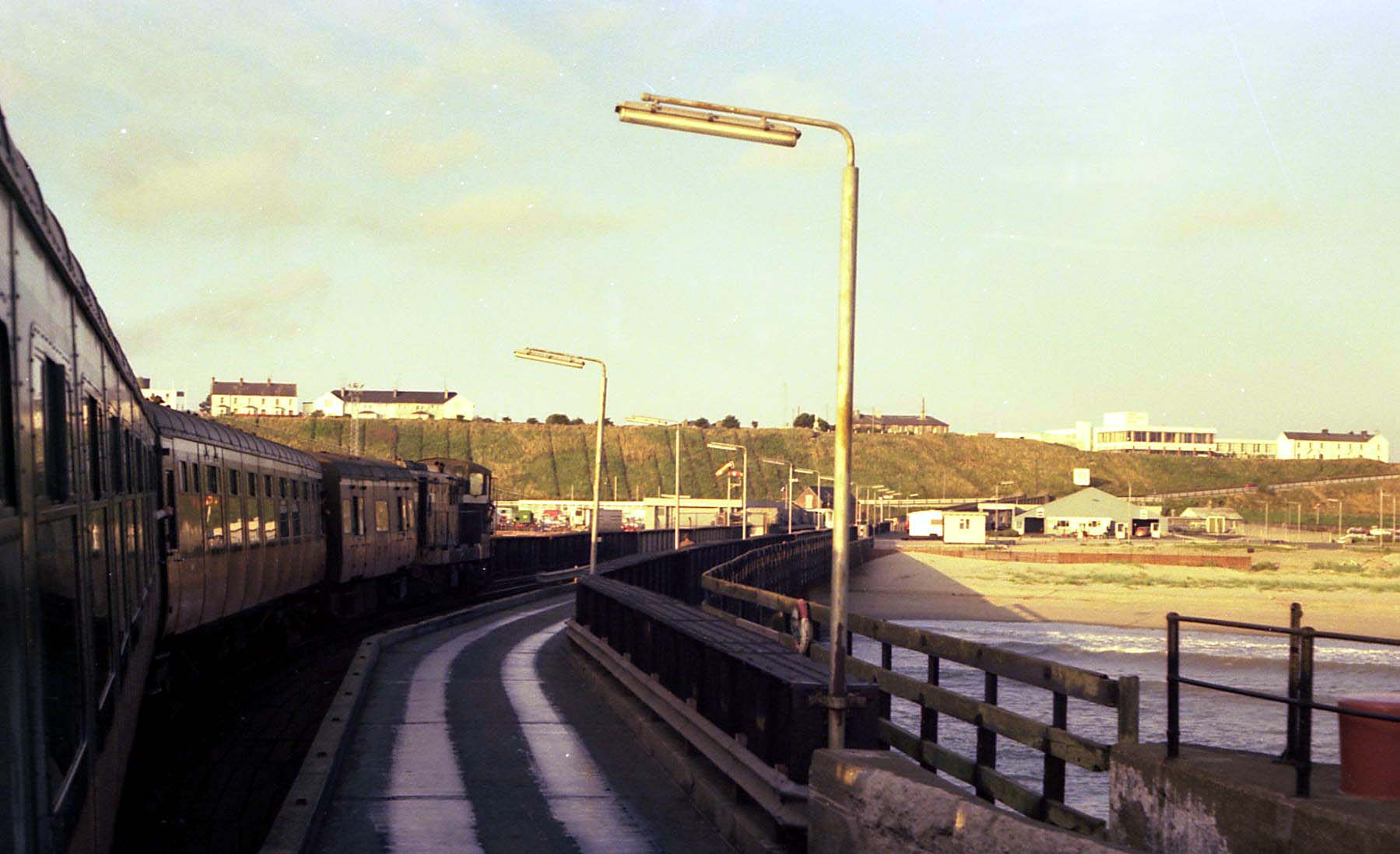
Train departing from Rosslare harbour 30 July 1975

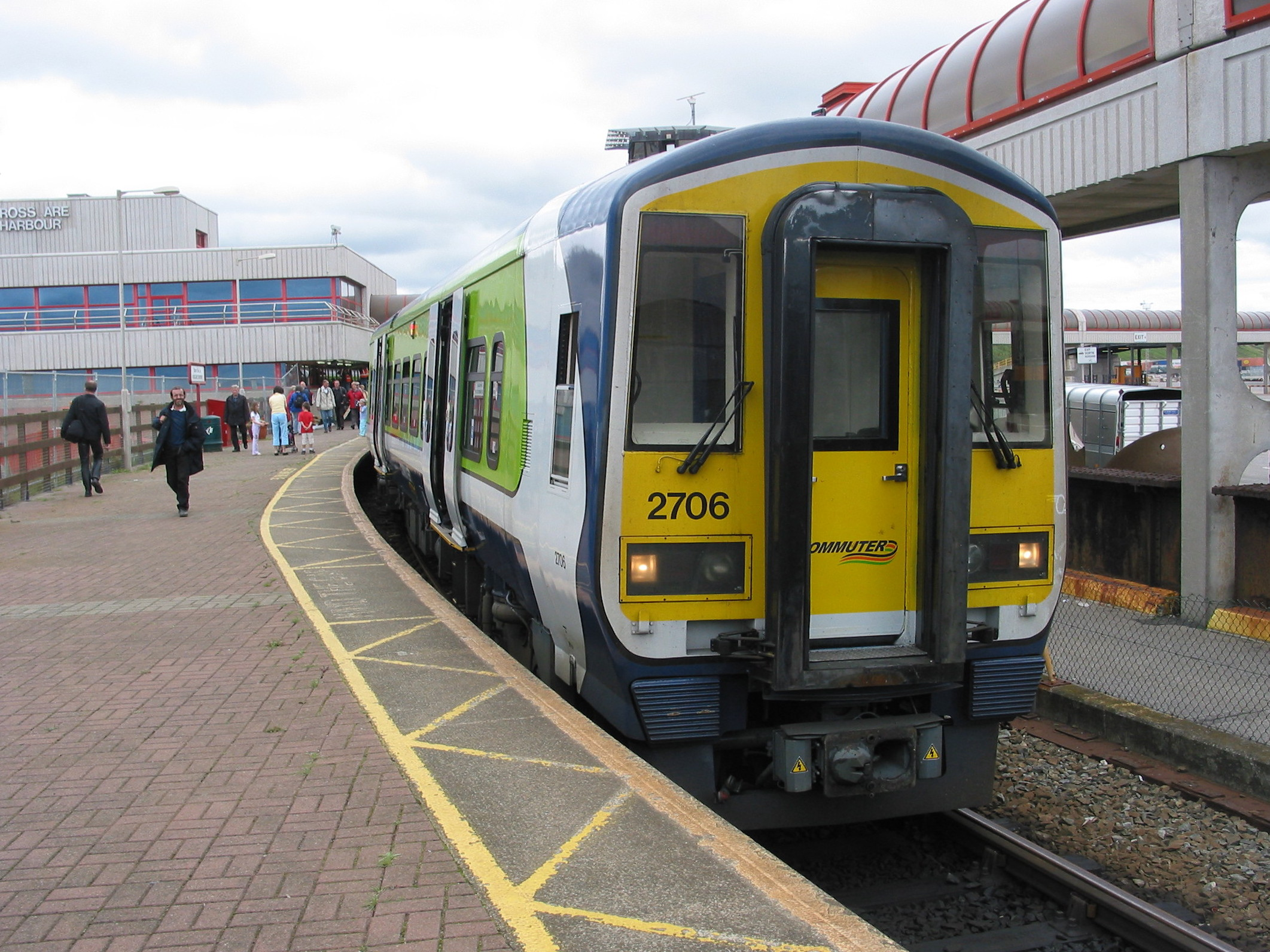
IÉ 2706 at Rosslare harbour in 2004

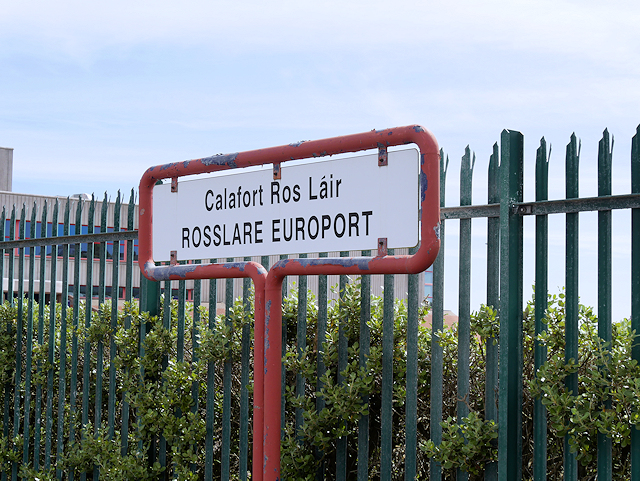
Sign 14th of July 2016

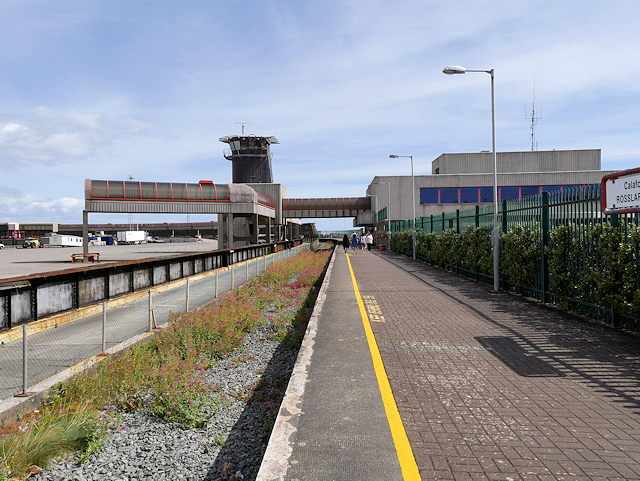
Former Rail Station at Rosslare Terminal 14th July 2016

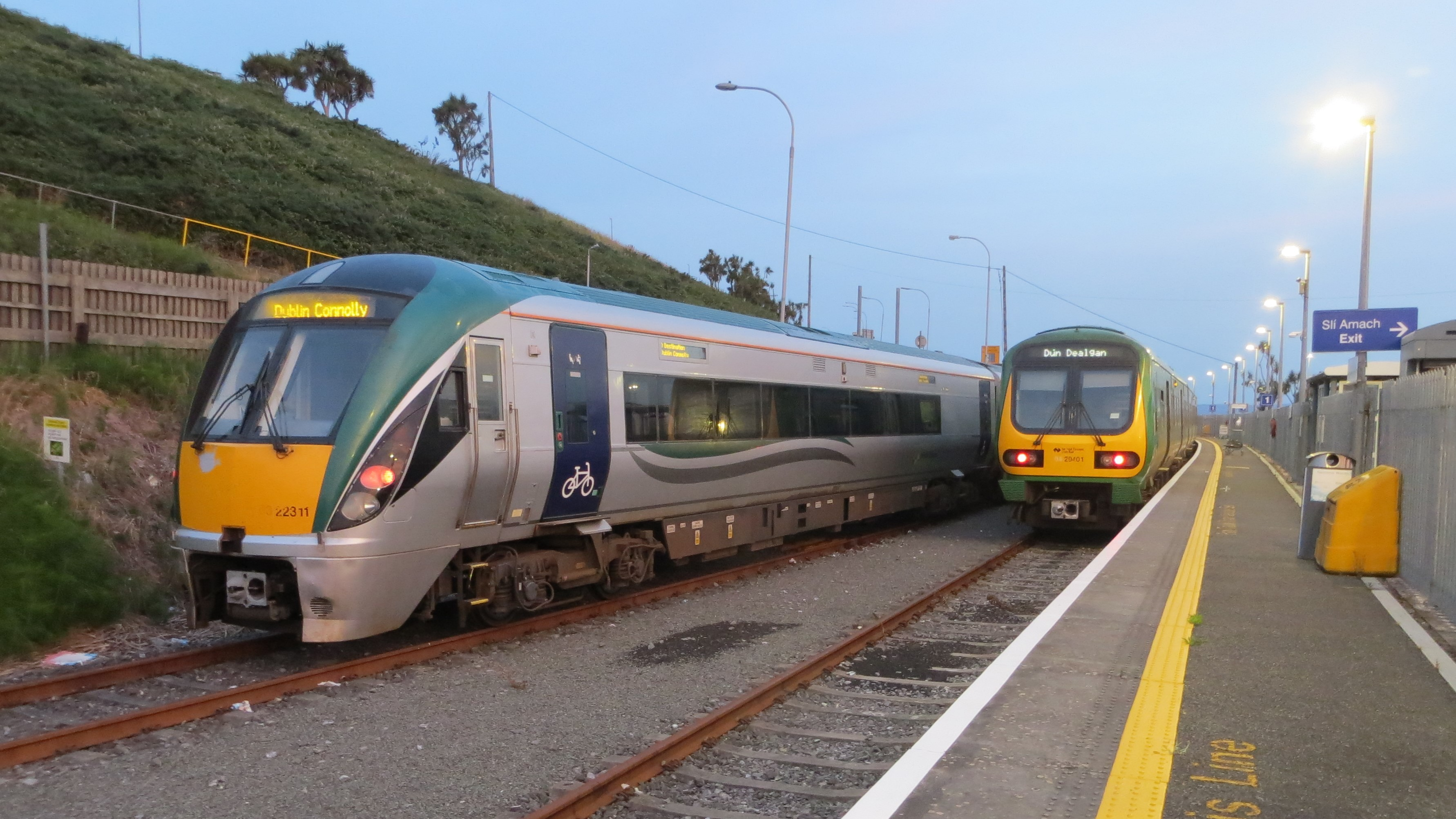
Early morning trains to Dundalk and Dublin 19th of July 2022

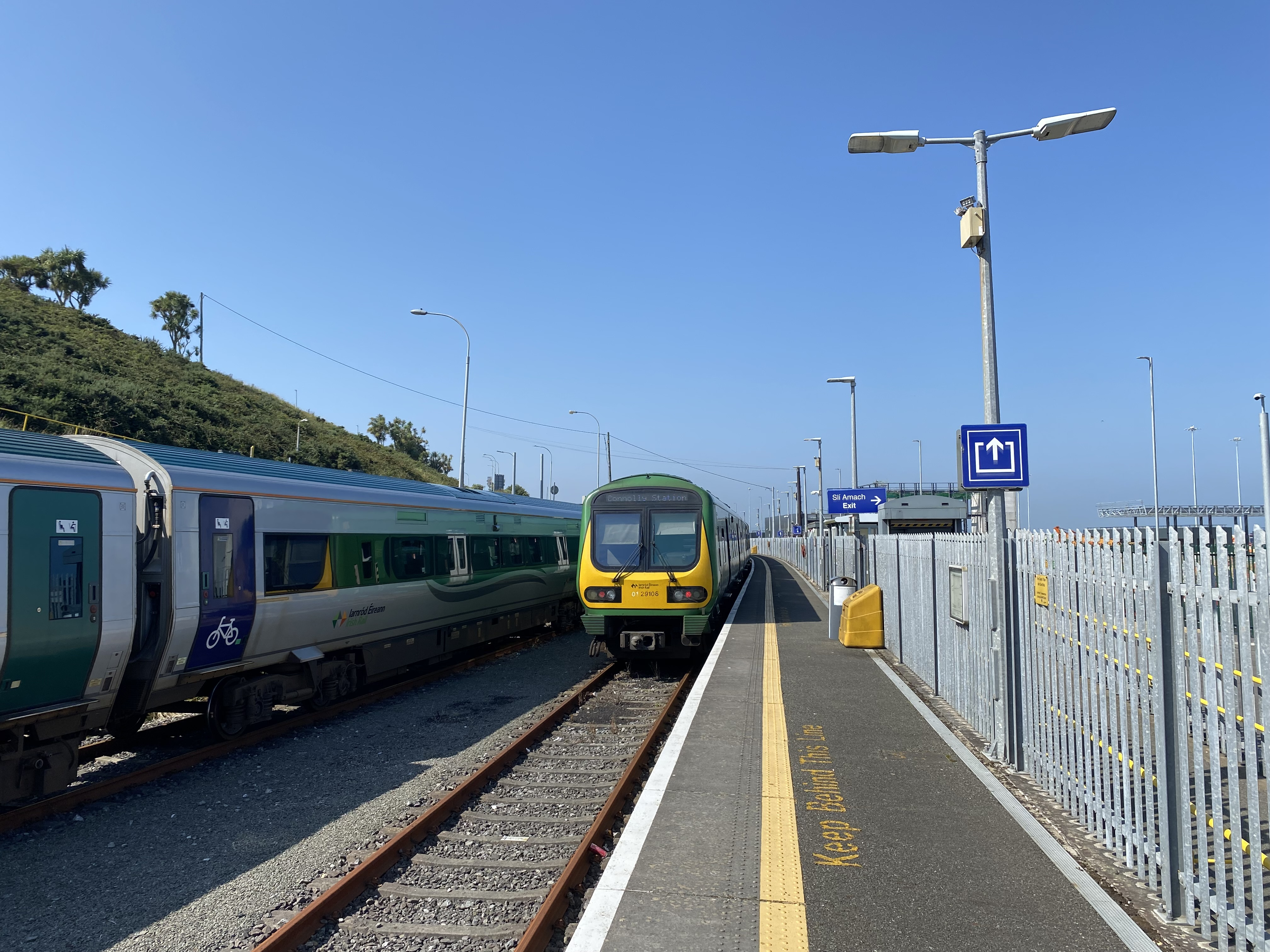
Rosslare Europort railway station on 31 August 2024

Rosslare Europort Logo

== See also ==
- List of railway stations in Ireland
