= Gorey railway station =

Station in County Wexford, Ireland

Gorey Guaire
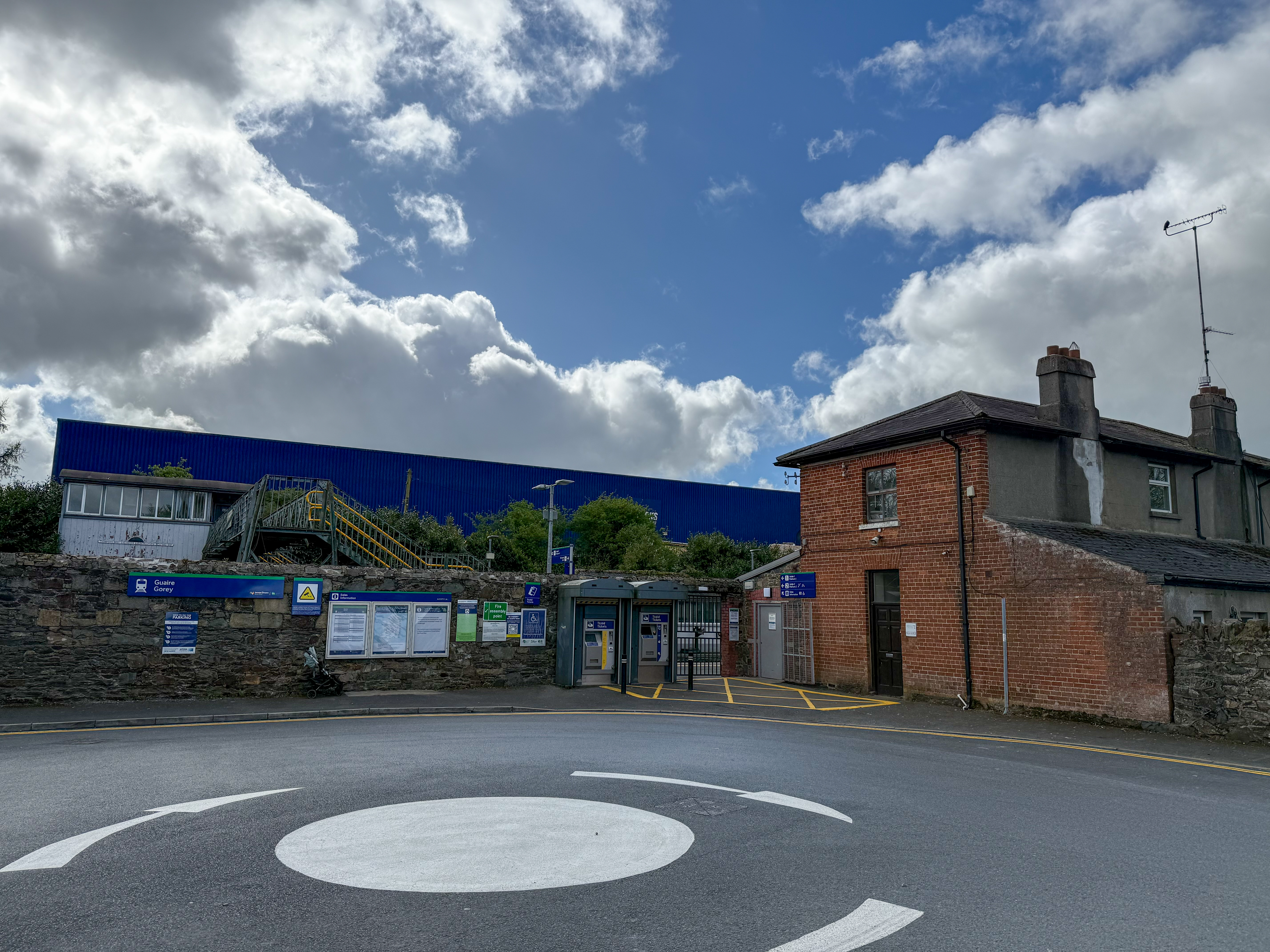
- Gorey station in 2026

General information
- Location: Railway Road, Gorey; County Wexford, Y25 PY58; Ireland
- Coordinates: 52.6712°N 6.2922°W
- Owner: Iarnród Éireann
- Operator: Iarnród Éireann
- Platforms: 2
- Bus operators: Bus Éireann; TFI Local Link
- Connections: 379; 389

Construction
- Structure type: At-grade

Other information
- Station code: GOREY
- Fare zone: H

History
- Opened: 1863
- Original company: Dublin, Wicklow and Wexford Railway
- Pre-grouping: Dublin and South Eastern Railway
- Post-grouping: Great Southern Railways
Location

Gorey railway station (Irish: Stáisiún Ghuaire) is a railway station in the town of Gorey, County Wexford, Ireland. It is on the Dublin–Rosslare line.

== Services/routes ==
The service from the station is:

Monday to Friday

- 6 trains per day to Dublin Connolly
- 4 trains per day to Rosslare Europort
- 1 train per day to Wexford O'Hanrahan

Saturdays

- 4 trains per day to Dublin Connolly (one continuing to Dundalk Clarke)
- 3 trains per day to Rosslare Europort

Sundays

- 3 trains per day to Dublin Connolly
- 3 trains per day to Rosslare Europort

Preceding station	Iarnród Éireann	Following station
Arklow	InterCity; Dublin-Rosslare	Enniscorthy
Arklow	Commuter; South Eastern Commuter	Terminus
	Disused railways	
Inch; Line open, station closed	Dublin and South Eastern Railway; Dublin-Rosslare	Camolin; Line open, station closed

== Description ==
The station is staffed with a small waiting room and ticket office. Only Platform 1 (the platform nearest the entrance) is wheelchair-accessible.

It consists of two platforms, one on the down passing loop. There is a water tower, still used by occasional steam trains, at the north end of Platform 1. There is also a siding, formerly a loop, cut back to allow the platforms to be extended in early 2006. This is regularly used when there are engineering works on the line.

Most of the line from Dublin to Wexford and Rosslare is single track with passing loops at stations. When the signal box is open the loop can be used, otherwise trains use the main platform. Prior to the installation of mini-CTC on the line in April 2008, it was not normally possible for northbound trains to use the loop, as it was only signalled in the Rosslare direction. This led to some awkward shunting arrangements when a locomotive-hauled train terminated. The timetable suggests that only one train each way has to use of the loop.

The station's car park has an electric vehicle charging facility, with spaces for 2 EVs.

== History ==
The station was opened on 16 November 1863.

== In popular culture ==
The station is featured in the eponymous 1980s book of poetry, "Train to Gorey" by Liz O’Donoghue.

== See also ==
- List of railway stations in Ireland
