= Arklow railway station =

Station in County Wicklow, Ireland

Arklow An tInbhear Mór
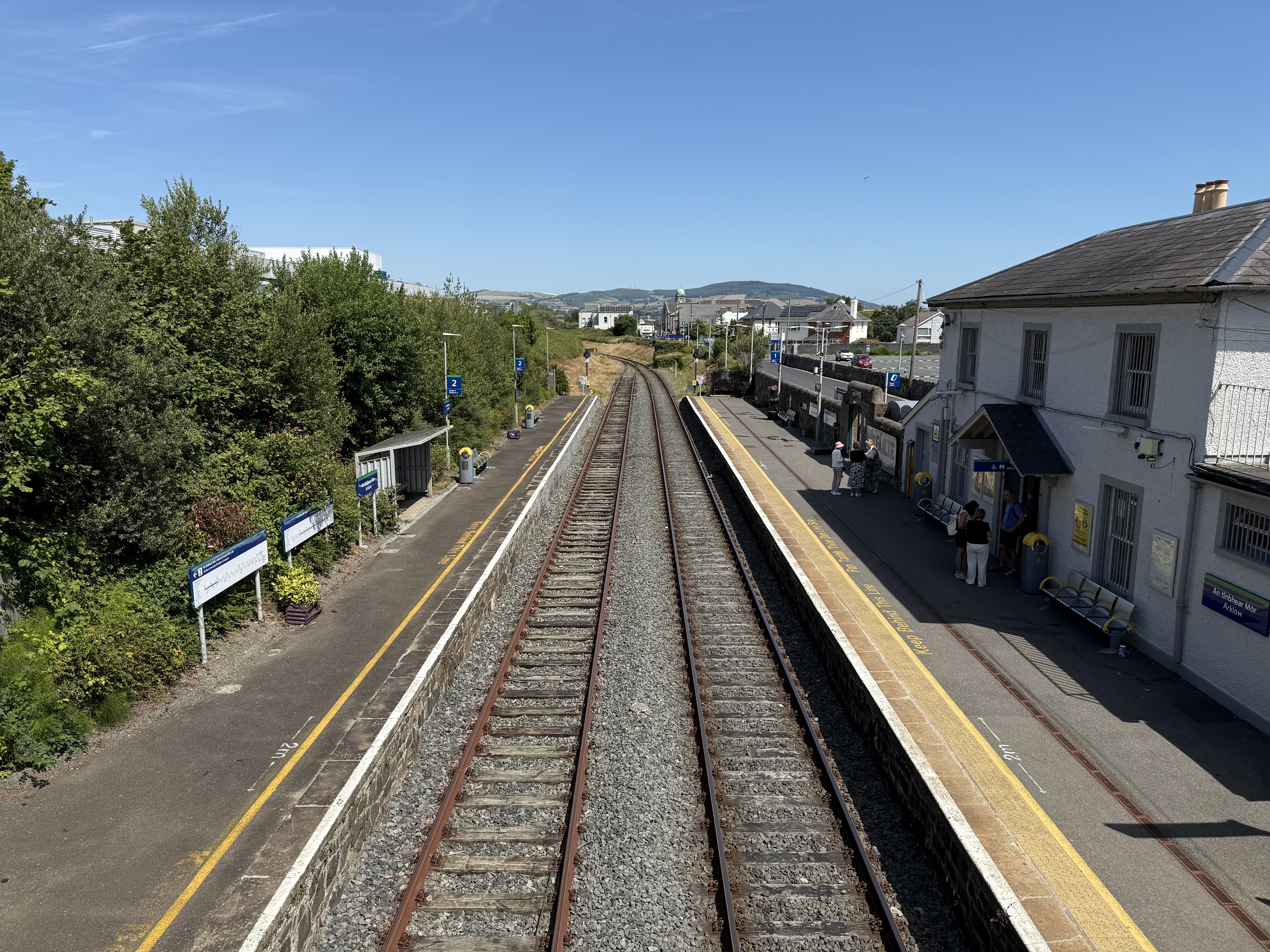
- Arklow Station in 2025

General information
- Location: Saint Mary's Road, Arklow; County Wicklow, Y14 YD89; Ireland
- Coordinates: 52°47′38″N 6°9′35″W
- Owner: Iarnród Éireann
- Operator: Iarnród Éireann
- Platforms: 2
- Bus operators: TFI Local Link
- Connections: 183; 800

Construction
- Structure type: At-grade
- Accessible: Yes

Other information
- Station code: ARKLW
- Fare zone: G

History
- Opened: 16 November 1863
- Original company: Dublin, Wicklow and Wexford Railway
- Pre-grouping: Dublin and South Eastern Railway
- Post-grouping: Great Southern Railways

Key dates
- 2002: Freight services cease
Location

Arklow railway station (Irish: Stáisiún an tInbhear Mór) is a railway station in Arklow, County Wicklow, Ireland.

== History ==
The station opened on 16 November 1863.

Opened by the Dublin and South Eastern Railway the station was part of the Great Southern & Western Railway then absorbed into Great Southern Railways by the Railways (Great Southern) Preliminary Amalgamation Scheme of 12 November 1924.

The station passed to CIÉ as a result of the Transport Act, 1944 which took effect from 1 January 1945, then to Iarnród Éireann on 2 February 1987.

As with other stations between Wicklow and Rosslare Europort, semaphore signalling and ETS operation ceased here in April 2008. A colour-light signal existed here in semaphore days, having been installed in 1977.

== Accidents and incidents ==
On 3 October 1979, a passenger train and a freight train were involved in a head-on collision. Twenty-nine people were injured.

== Description ==
Waiting facilities include three covered shelters, one on platform 1 and two on platform 2. There is a waiting room next to the ticket office in the station building on platform 1. A pay-and-display car park is in the former goods yard, with capacity for 150 vehicles and a covered bicycle parking area.

The station is staffed full-time.

It has two platforms, one on the passing loop.

== Services/routes ==
The service from the station is:

Monday to Friday

- 6 trains per day to Dublin Connolly (one continuing to Dundalk Clarke)
- 4 trains per day to Rosslare Europort
- 1 train per day to Wexford O'Hanrahan
- 1 train per day to Gorey.

Saturdays

- 4 trains per day to Dublin Connolly (one continuing to Dundalk Clarke)
- 3 trains per day to Rosslare Europort

Sundays

- 3 trains per day to Dublin Connolly
- 3 trains per day to Rosslare Europort

== Transport ==
TFI Local Link (Carlow Kilkenny Wicklow division) bus route 800 operates to Carlow IT from the station 4 times a day (3 on Sundays). Additionally, a number of Bus Éireann bus routes stop at Main Street, which is located 500 m from the station.

== See also ==
- List of railway stations in Ireland

Preceding station	Iarnród Éireann	Following station
Rathdrum	InterCity; Dublin-Rosslare railway line	Gorey
Rathdrum	Commuter; South Eastern Commuter	Gorey
	Disused railways	
Woodenbridge; Line open, station closed	Dublin and South Eastern Railway; Dublin-Rosslare	Inch; Line open, station closed
