= Rosslare Strand =

Seaside village in County Wexford, Ireland

Rosslare Irish: Ros Láir
- Village
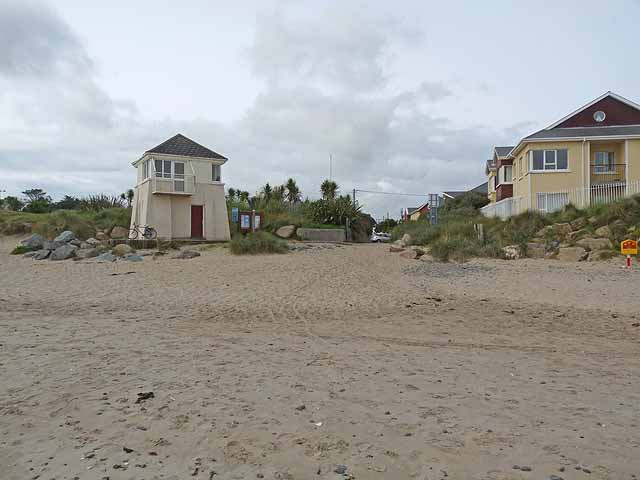
- Rosslare's beach is accessible directly from Rosslare village

- Location in Ireland
- Coordinates: 52°16′23″N 6°23′12″W
- Country: Ireland
- Province: Leinster
- County: County Wexford

Population (2022)
  - Total: 1,795

Rosslare Strand, or simply Rosslare (Irish: Ros Láir, meaning 'middle promontory' or 'middle wood'), is a village and seaside resort in County Wexford, Ireland. The name Rosslare Strand is used to distinguish it from the nearby community of Rosslare Harbour, site of the Rosslare Europort.

== Tourism ==
Rosslare has been a tourist resort for at least 100 years. It is noted as the "sunniest spot in Ireland", and records bear this out: Rosslare has consistently more sunshine hours that any other part of Ireland. The long sandy strand is a Blue Flag beach. The beach itself consists of sand and stone running the length of the southern peninsula which protrudes into Wexford Harbour. It is segmented by a series of timber breakwaters which are designed to retain sandy deposits along the beach.

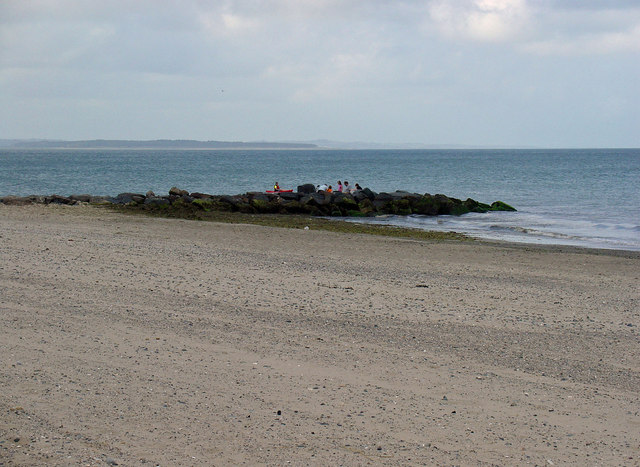
Groyne on Rosslare beach

There are a number of golf courses in the vicinity. Rosslare also has several hotels, cafes and restaurants.

At the time of the 1996 census, the village had a population of 929 people, increasing to 1,795 by the time of the 2022 census. According to the April 2016 census, of the 551 occupied private households in the village, 228 were built between 2001 and 2010. During the early 21st century, the village saw an amount of building, including of a number of holiday homes. There are a number of housing estates of holiday homes near the strand, and the population reportedly grows from "about 1,500 to 17,000" during the summer months.

A long sandspit stretching north from Rosslare separates Wexford Harbour from the Irish Sea. Until the early 1920s, this spit stretched for many miles north, almost touching the Raven Point and giving a very narrow mouth to Wexford Harbour. At the end of the spit was a small fort called Rosslare Fort. In the winter of 1924-25 a storm breached the spit and it was gradually washed away. The fort was abandoned and now all that is left is an island at low tide.

== Climate ==
Rosslare is commonly known in Ireland as being in the "Sunny South-East", and in 1959 Rosslare recorded 1,996.4 hours of sunshine, the highest recorded in Ireland. However, it is not the warmest or driest place in Ireland.

Met Éireann operated a weather station at Rosslare until its closure in 2007. Sunshine duration for the county is now recorded at the Johnstown Castle weather station, which has been operational since 2009. However, due to its inland location, Johnstown Castle receives considerably less sunshine than Rosslare.

Climate data for Rosslare, County Wexford, elevation 26m, (1978–2007, extremes 1956–2007)
Month	Jan	Feb	Mar	Apr	May	Jun	Jul	Aug	Sep	Oct	Nov	Dec	Year
Record high °C (°F)	14.1 (57.4)	14.1 (57.4)	15.8 (60.4)	20.1 (68.2)	22.3 (72.1)	25.5 (77.9)	26.2 (79.2)	25.9 (78.6)	22.0 (71.6)	21.5 (70.7)	17.2 (63.0)	15.6 (60.1)	26.2 (79.2)
Mean daily maximum °C (°F)	8.8 (47.8)	8.5 (47.3)	9.9 (49.8)	11.3 (52.3)	13.6 (56.5)	16.3 (61.3)	18.3 (64.9)	18.5 (65.3)	16.8 (62.2)	14.0 (57.2)	11.3 (52.3)	9.5 (49.1)	13.1 (55.6)
Daily mean °C (°F)	6.5 (43.7)	6.3 (43.3)	7.5 (45.5)	8.8 (47.8)	11.1 (52.0)	13.6 (56.5)	15.5 (59.9)	15.7 (60.3)	14.2 (57.6)	11.6 (52.9)	9.0 (48.2)	7.4 (45.3)	10.6 (51.1)
Mean daily minimum °C (°F)	4.2 (39.6)	4.1 (39.4)	5.1 (41.2)	6.3 (43.3)	8.6 (47.5)	11.0 (51.8)	12.7 (54.9)	12.9 (55.2)	11.6 (52.9)	9.3 (48.7)	6.7 (44.1)	5.2 (41.4)	8.1 (46.6)
Record low °C (°F)	−5.1 (22.8)	−4.1 (24.6)	−2.7 (27.1)	−1.0 (30.2)	−0.3 (31.5)	4.7 (40.5)	5.2 (41.4)	6.1 (43.0)	2.6 (36.7)	0.7 (33.3)	−2.5 (27.5)	−3.1 (26.4)	−5.1 (22.8)
Average precipitation mm (inches)	88.4 (3.48)	70.8 (2.79)	69.1 (2.72)	59.1 (2.33)	55.7 (2.19)	54.9 (2.16)	49.9 (1.96)	71.6 (2.82)	75.0 (2.95)	109.3 (4.30)	100.9 (3.97)	100.8 (3.97)	905.5 (35.65)
Average precipitation days (≥ 0.2 mm)	17	15	16	13	13	12	12	13	13	17	17	17	175
Average snowy days	1.7	2.3	1.0	0.4	0.1	0.0	0.0	0.0	0.0	0.0	0.0	0.6	6.2
Average relative humidity (%)	80.8	79.0	77.8	76.1	77.2	77.7	77.2	76.9	77.1	78.7	80.2	82.2	78.4
Mean monthly sunshine hours	60.3	75.7	114.1	173.9	214.9	189.9	199.5	191.1	146.1	105.5	73.3	55.2	1,599.5
Source 1: Met Éireann
Source 2: European Climate Assessment & Dataset,

== Transport ==
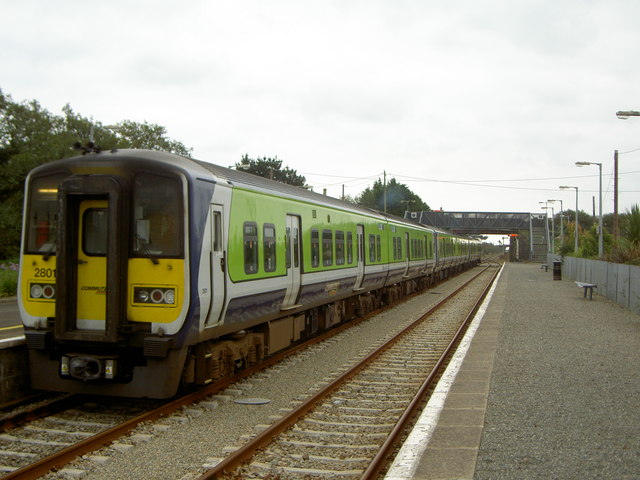
Rosslare Strand station in 2007

=== Rail transport ===
Rosslare is served by Rosslare Strand railway station, which opened on 24 June 1882. The Dublin to Rosslare Europort railway serves the village.

=== Bus transport ===
Two main local bus services operate; 'Wexford Bus' and 'Local Link'.

The village is also served by Bus Éireann route 370. The 370 links it to Wellingtonbridge, New Ross and Waterford (this bus route replaces the train service to Waterford which ceased in September 2010).

== Gallery ==
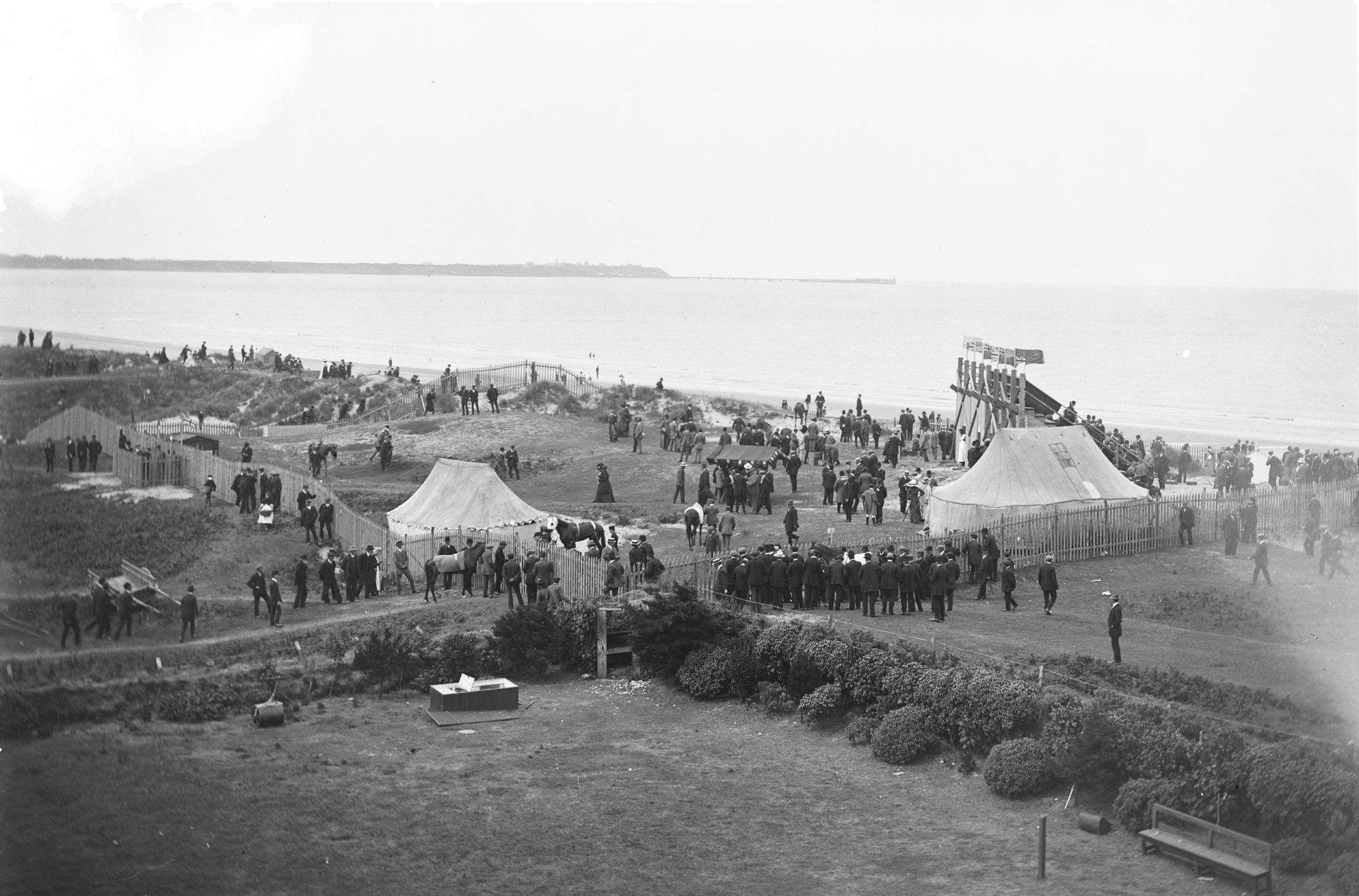
Strand Races, Rosslare

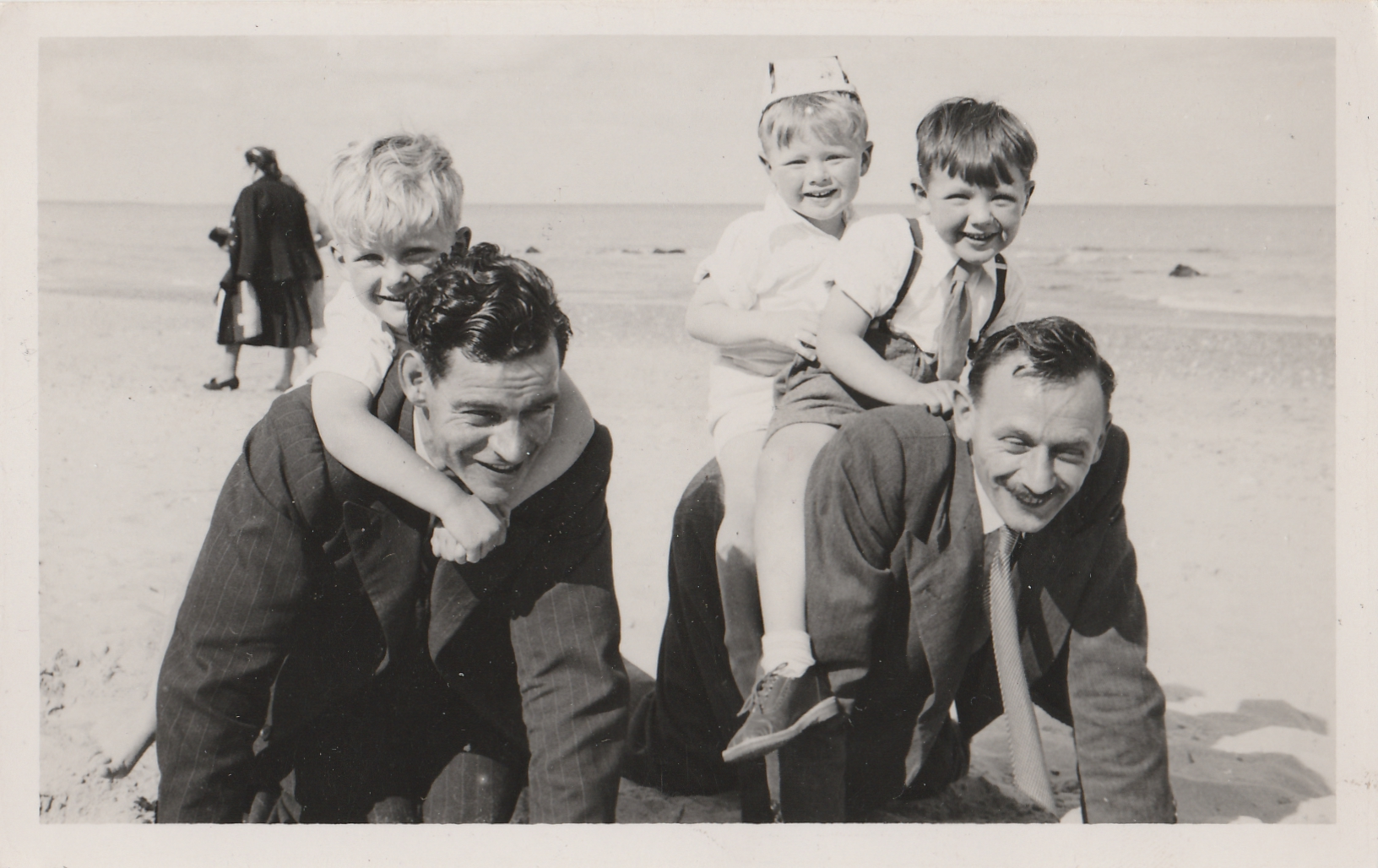
People playing on the beach circa 1952

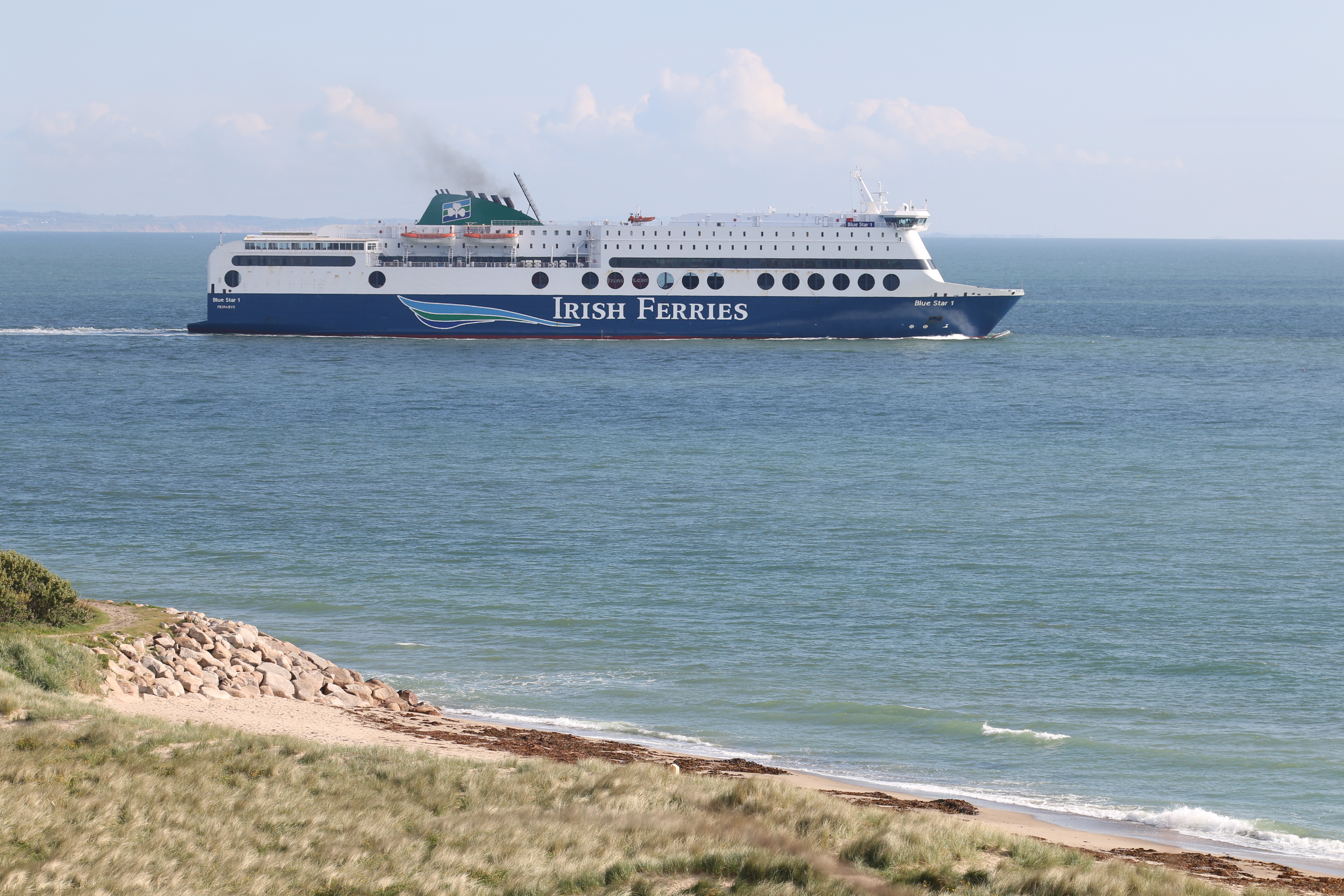
An Irish Ferries ship en route from Rosslare Europort to Pembroke Dock, Wales in 2021

== See also ==
- List of towns and villages in Ireland
