= Enniscorthy railway station =

Station in County Wexford, Ireland

Enniscorthy Inis Córthaidh
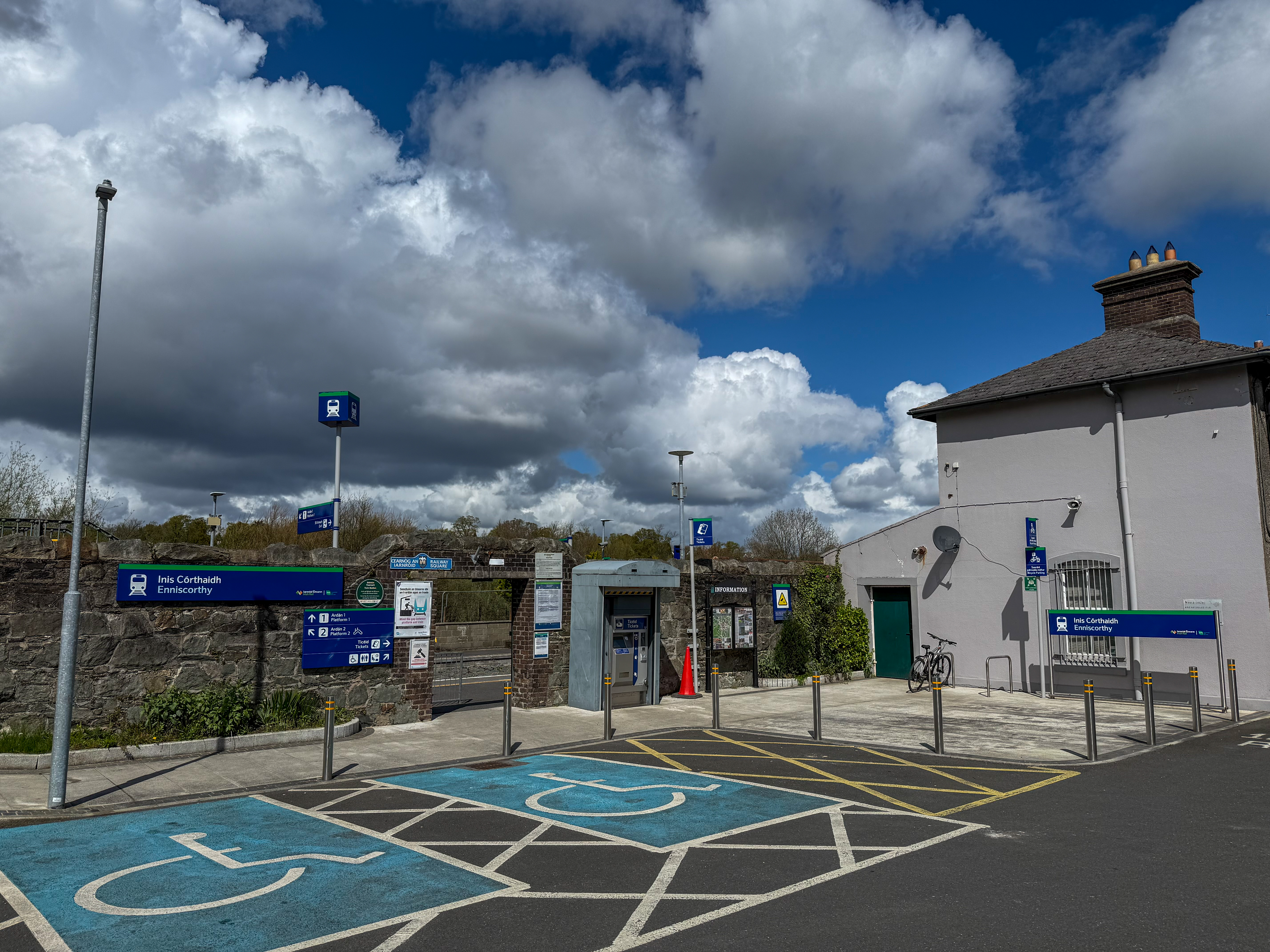
- Enniscorthy Station in 2026

General information
- Location: Enniscorthy, County Wexford, Y21 N289; Ireland
- Coordinates: 52.5044°N 6.5662°W
- Owner: Iarnród Éireann
- Operator: Iarnród Éireann
- Platforms: 2
- Tracks: 2

Construction
- Structure type: At-grade
- Accessible: Yes

Other information
- Station code: ECRTY
- Fare zone: K

History
- Opened: 16 November 1863
- Original company: DSER
- Post-grouping: GSR
Location

Enniscorthy railway station (Irish: Stáisiún Inis Córthaidh) is a railway station in County Wexford, Ireland. It is in the centre of the town of Enniscorthy.

== Description ==
It has two platforms, a passing loop and a siding. The station is fully staffed. The far-side platform, accessible only by a footbridge, is used only when two trains pass.

== History ==
The station opened on 16 November 1863. Originally there was a turntable behind the second platform which was used during the building of the tunnel under Enniscorthy town but was also used afterwards due to heavy traffic on Market Day. There was once an engine shed that was opposite of the present-day goods shed. Two water columns were at each end of the platforms and there was also a very long siding for loading cattle. There were also a number of sidings, including a siding for O'Donahoes behind the station building, a siding for Buttles Bacon Factory (which is now the site of the Enniscorthy Swimming Pool), a siding at the entrance of the tunnel for Roches and another siding that went under Barrack Street via a tunnel to Minch Norton. Outside Enniscorthy there were sidings for St. Johns Flour Mill and St. Johns Foundry and a siding at the headshunt for Kavanaghs Cement.

Enniscorthy was also where the locomotive No. 17 "Wicklow" left with a Cattle Special to Dublin Harcourt Street but was unable to stop and ran through the end wall and fell into Hatch Street, though it was not a serious accident and only injured the Driver who remained at his post in the cab and a horse on Hatch Street. This event became one of Ireland's famous rail accidents.

== Services ==
The service from the station is:

Monday to Friday

- 5 trains per day to Dublin Connolly via Bray Daly (one continuing to Dundalk Clarke)
- 4 trains per day to Rosslare Europort
- 1 train per day to Wexford O'Hanrahan

Saturdays

- 4 trains per day to Dublin Connolly via Bray Daly (one continuing to Dundalk Clarke)
- 3 trains per day to Rosslare Europort

Sundays

- 3 trains per day to Dublin Connolly via Bray Daly
- 3 trains per day to Rosslare Europort

== See also ==
- List of railway stations in Ireland

Preceding station	Iarnród Éireann	Following station
Gorey	InterCity; Dublin-Rosslare railway line	Wexford; O'Hanrahan
