= Rosslare Strand railway station =

Station in County Wexford, Ireland

Rosslare Strand Stáisiún Trá Ros Láir
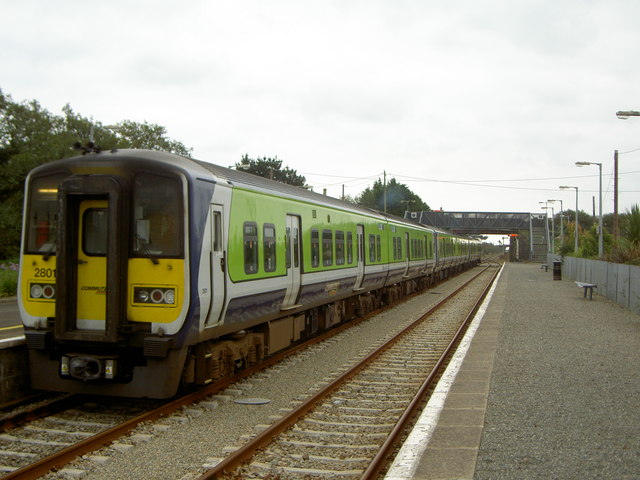
- 2801 working the early afternoon train to Dublin Connolly on platform 1

General information
- Location: Station Road, Rosslare; County Wexford, Y35 NA06; Ireland
- Coordinates: 52.2718°N 6.3915°W
- Owner: Iarnród Éireann
- Operator: Iarnród Éireann
- Platforms: 2

Construction
- Structure type: At-grade
- Accessible: Yes

Other information
- Station code: RLSTD
- Fare zone: M

History
- Original company: Fishguard & Rosslare Railways & Harbours Company
- Post-grouping: GSR

Key dates
- 24 June 1882: Opened, as Rosslare
- 17 May 1889: Closed
- 6 August 1894: Reopened
- 18 September 2010: Services to Waterford cease
- 26 April 2014: Station becomes unstaffed
Location

Rosslare Strand railway station (Irish: Stáisiún Thrá Ros Láir) is in Rosslare Strand, County Wexford, Ireland. It is the junction of the Dublin–Rosslare railway line and the Limerick–Rosslare railway line, the Rosslare Strand to Waterford section of which is currently not in use.

== Description ==
A ticket machine is provided at the entrance and there are shelters on the platforms. There is also a small car park currently free of charge to rail users. Since spring 2014 the station has been unstaffed and the ticket office, waiting room, and toilets are no longer open.

There is full accessibility to the first platform, with access to the second platform via a wicket gate or footbridge.

There are two platforms, one on the passing loop. The mothballed South Wexford section of the Limerick-Rosslare railway line can be accessed only via the second platform, the junction being on the passing loop.

== Mothballing of Rosslare Europort to Waterford Rail Section ==
The final Rosslare Europort to Limerick passenger service ran on Saturday 18 September 2010, which saw the mothballing of most of the Rosslare Europort to Waterford section of track, except for the Waterford to Belview section which is used several times a week by freight trains.

== Replacement bus service to Waterford ==
The rail service to Wellingtonbridge and Waterford is replaced by a revised Bus Éireann route 370 which caters for those affected by the suspension of the railway service. The bus stop is located on Strand Road in the centre of Rosslare Strand around five minutes on foot from the rail station.

== History ==
The station opened, as Rosslare, on 24 June 1882. Renamed Rosslare Strand in 1906.

Prior to track modifications in 1973 it was possible to access the Waterford line from both platforms.

A signal cabin was at the Wexford end of the main platform.

== Accidents and incidents ==
- On 13 August 1974, two passenger trains were involved in a head-on collision at Rosslare Strand. Fifteen people were injured.

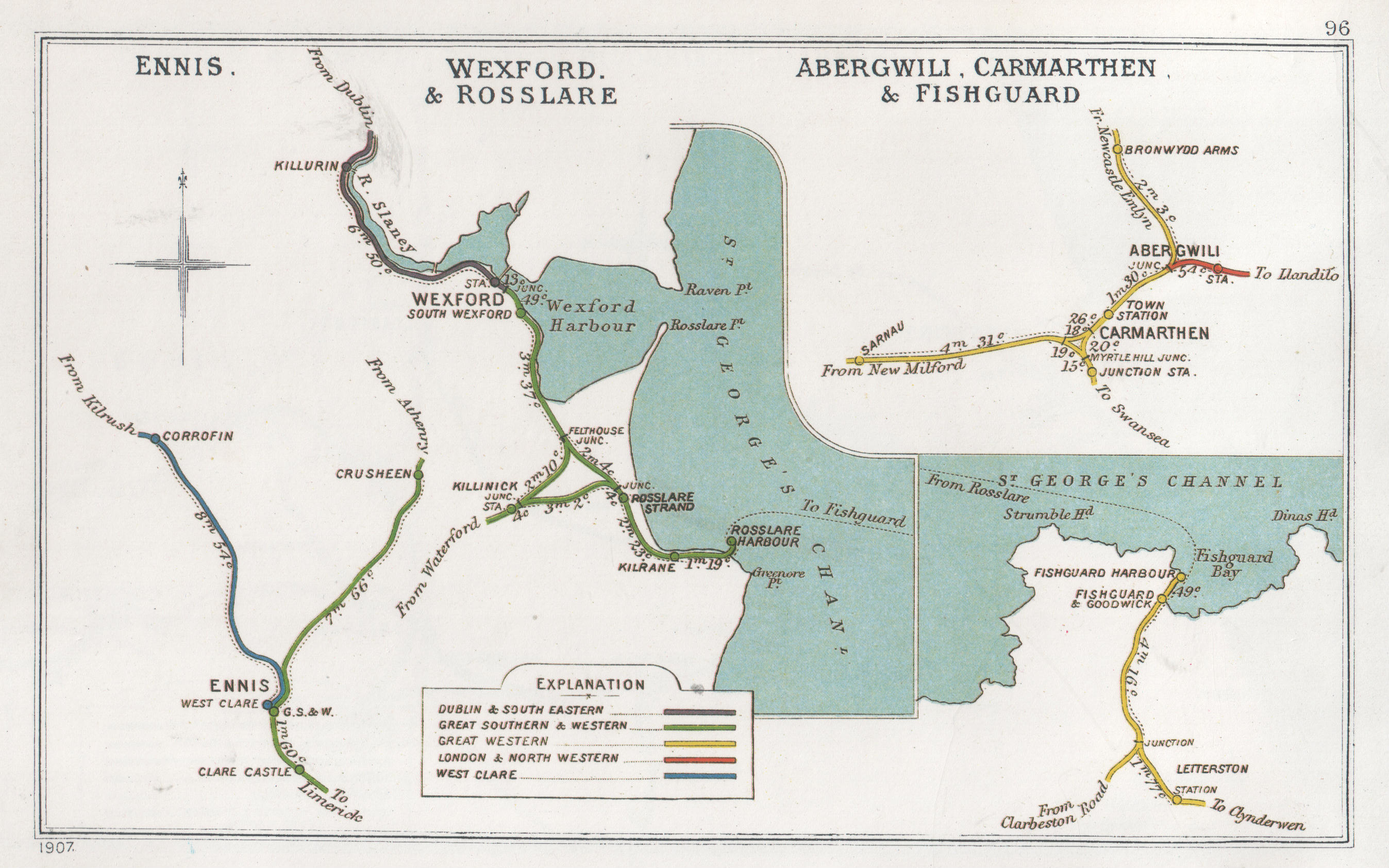
The Railway Clearing House maps with the railways around Rosslare and further afield.

== See also ==
- List of railway stations in Ireland

Preceding station	Iarnród Éireann	Following station
Wexford; O'Hanrahan	InterCity; Dublin-Rosslare railway line	Rosslare; Europort
	Disused railways	
Bridgetown; Line and station closed	InterCity; Limerick-Rosslare railway line	Rosslare; Europort
