= Wexford railway station =

Station in County Wexford, Ireland

Wexford O'Hanrahan Ó hAnnracháin, Loch Garman
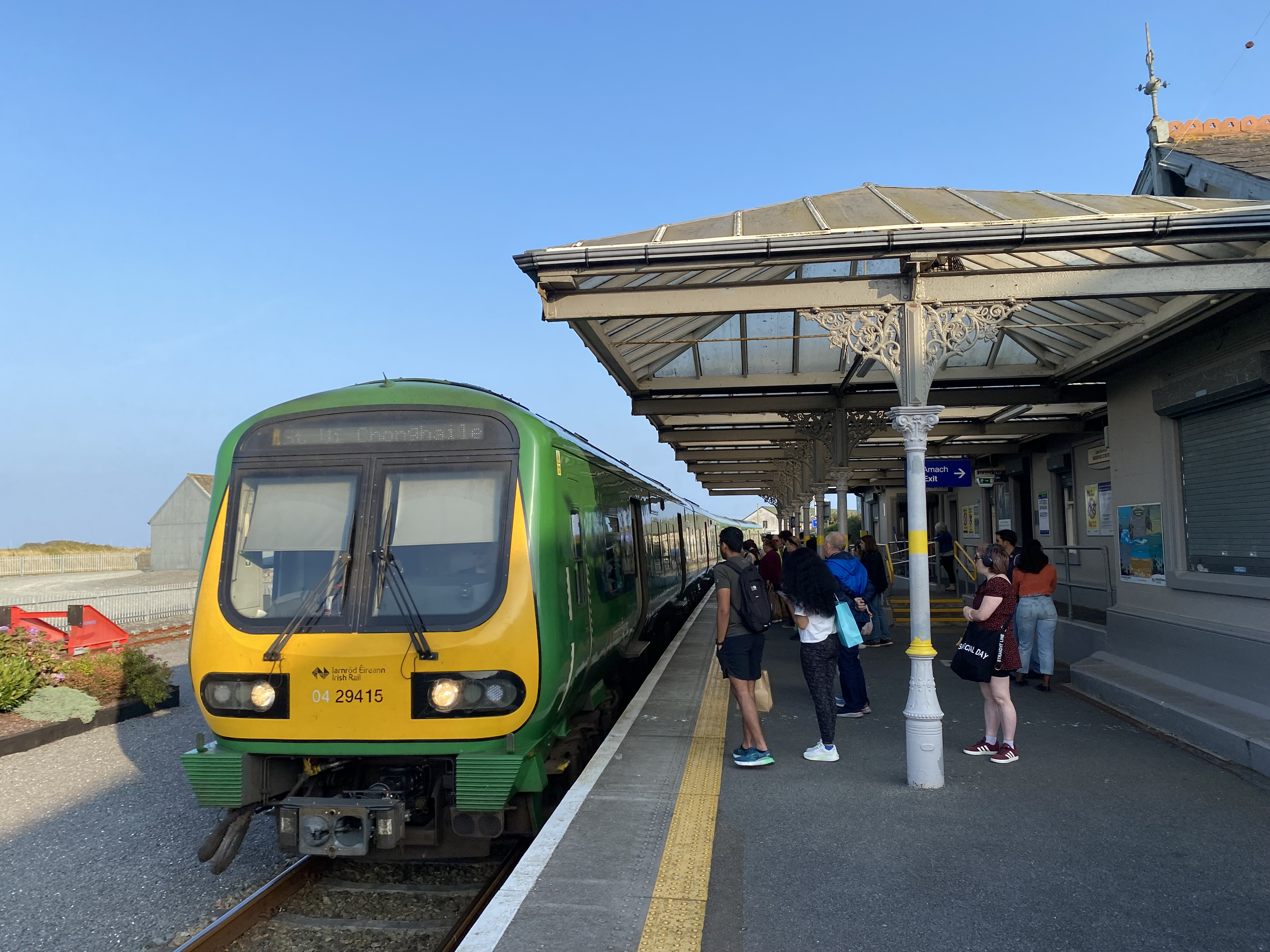
- 29415 at Wexford station in August 2024

General information
- Location: Redmond Square, Wexford; County Wexford, Y35 FC62; Ireland
- Coordinates: 52.343333°N 6.464167°W
- Owner: Iarnród Éireann
- Operator: Iarnród Éireann
- Platforms: 1
- Bus operators: Bus Éireann; Michael Gray Coaches; TFI Local Link; Wexford Bus
- Connections: 2; 132; 340; 370; 372; 376; 379; 384; 387; 388; 390; 740; 740X; 859; 872; 875; 877; 884; WX1; WX2

Construction
- Structure type: At-grade

Other information
- Station code: WXFRD
- Fare zone: L

History
- Opened: 17 August 1872
- Original company: Dublin, Wicklow and Wexford Railway
- Pre-grouping: Dublin and South Eastern Railway
- Post-grouping: Great Southern Railways

Key dates
- 1966: Renamed Wexford O'Hanrahan Station
Location

Wexford railway station (O'Hanrahan Station, Irish: Stáisiún Uí Annracháin) is a railway station located in Wexford Town in County Wexford, Ireland.

== Description ==
The station is part of the Dublin–Rosslare railway line. It is staffed and fully accessible.

It consists of a single platform and passing loop.

It had sidings, used in recent years by occasional permanent way trains. With the coming of the mini-CTC signalling system in April 2008, a passing loop was installed at the Dublin end of the station.

== Onward bus services ==
Nine Bus Éireann local bus routes serve the station: 11 routes terminate, and rail replacement route 370 to/from Wellingtonbridge and Campile and route 132 to Dublin via Carnew, Baltinglass and Tallaght call. Routes 370 and 385 (to Rosslare Strand) operate Mondays to Saturdays: the other routes operate on one or two days of the week, provide links to rural hamlets and villages such as Broadway, Crossabeg, Curracloe, Fethard-on-Sea, Kilmuckridge and Tacumshane. The bus stop is at the front of the station.

Wexford Bus provides four local bus routes, all operating Monday to Saturday inclusive. They link to Castlebridge, Kilmore Quay via Bridgetown and Rosslare Strand. There is also a route serving different areas in the town. The stops are on Redmond Square.

== History ==
The station opened on 17 August 1872 as Wexford North. It was given the name O'Hanrahan on 10 April 1966, in commemoration of Michael O'Hanrahan, one of the executed leaders of the 1916 Easter Rising.

== See also ==
- List of railway stations in Ireland

Preceding station	Iarnród Éireann	Following station
Enniscorthy	InterCity; Dublin-Rosslare railway line	Rosslare Strand
