= Dublin–Rosslare railway line =

Rail route in Ireland

Dublin–Rosslare Main Line
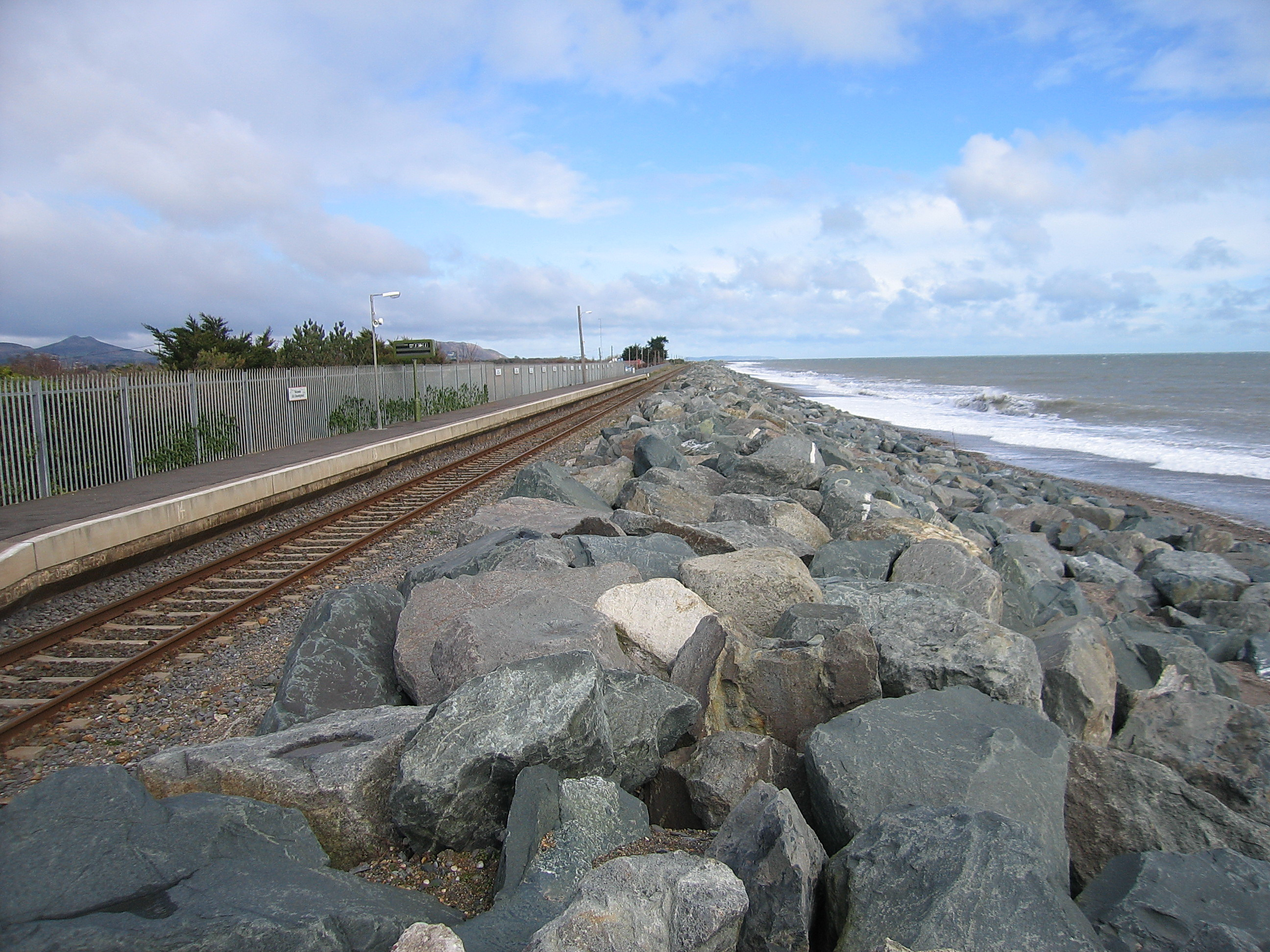
- Rock protection from flooding at Kilcoole

Overview
- Status: Operational
- Locale: East of Ireland
- Termini: Dublin Connolly; Rosslare Europort
- Stations: 29

Service
- Type: Commuter rail, Inter-city rail Heavy rail
- System: Iarnród Éireann
- Services: InterCity: Dublin–Rosslare; South Eastern Commuter; DART
- Operator(s): Iarnród Éireann
- Depot(s): Dublin Connolly
- Rolling stock: 8100 Class (DART); 8500, 8510 and 8520 Classes (DART); 29000 Class (Commuter); 22000 Class (InterCity)

History
- Opened: 17 December 1834 - 24 June 1882

Technical
- Line length: 104.375 (Note: The Network Statement breaks down the mileage as follows: 3/4 miles from Connolly to Pearse, 12 miles to Shanganagh Junction, 2 3/8 miles to Bray, 4 1/4 miles to Greystones, 75 1/2 miles to Wexford, 6 1/4 miles to Rosslare Strand, and 3 1/4 miles to Rosslare Europort.) mi (167.975 km)
- Number of tracks: Double track (Dublin Connolly–Bray); Single track (Bray–Rosslare Europort)
- Character: Tertiary
- Track gauge: 1,600 mm (5 ft 3 in) Irish gauge
- Electrification: 1,500 V DC OHLE (North of Greystones)
- Operating speed: 60 mph (95 km/h) (Dublin–Greystones); 70 mph (110 km/h) (Greystones–Rosslare)
Route map
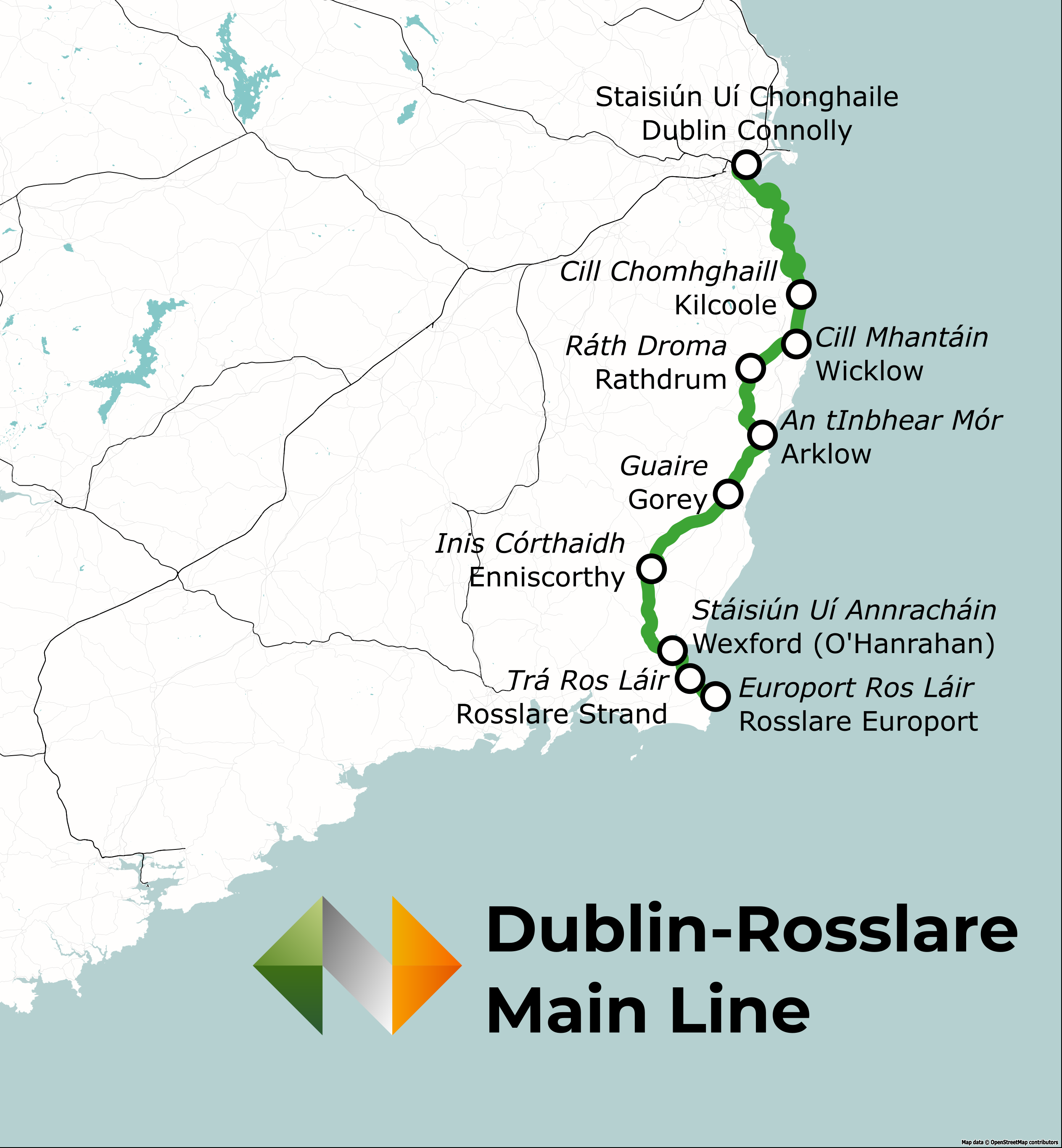
(Click to expand)

The Dublin-Rosslare Main Line is a main rail route between Dublin Connolly station and Rosslare Europort, where it connects with ferry services to the United Kingdom and mainland Europe. The line between Dublin and Greystones is electrified and forms the southern part of the DART service. Between Bray and Rosslare the line is single track only. The line connected with the Limerick–Rosslare line outside Rosslare Strand until 2010. From Wicklow on, semaphore signalling was used until April 2008, when the entire line was upgraded to the mini-CTC system controlled from Dublin Connolly. Although it is designated as a separate route, the line is continuous after Dublin Connolly, where it connects with the Belfast–Dublin main line.

The section between Westland Row (now Dublin Pearse) and a point on the line just after Salthill and Monkstown station is the oldest railway line in Ireland, and the first commuter railway in the world, opening in 1834. It was then known as the Dublin and Kingstown Railway. At that time, the railway terminated adjacent to the start of Dún Laoghaire Harbour's West Pier, at a station called Kingstown.

== Services ==
=== Passenger services ===
The Dublin–Rosslare railway line features both DART (Dublin Area Rapid Transit) services, commuter services and intercity trains, each operating at different intervals. On the electrified DART section between Dublin Connolly and Greystones, trains typically run every 10 minutes during peak hours on weekdays, approximately from 06:50 to 20:00. Off-peak services are generally available every 15 to 20 minutes. On Saturdays, the frequency is every 15 minutes, while on Sundays, service intervals vary, generally ranging from 20 to 30 minutes depending on the time of day.

Intercity services between Dublin and Rosslare are as follows. On weekdays, there are six trains from Dublin Connolly to Rosslare Europort and six trains from Rosslare Europort to Dublin Connolly. On Saturdays, three trains operate in each direction. On Sundays, three services are also available in both directions.

Some Northern Commuter services also originate at Grand Canal Dock, extending to Drogheda MacBride or Dundalk Clarke stations. There is a once-daily morning commuter service from Dundalk Clarke to Bray Daly and another from Drogheda MacBride to Bray Daly. In the evening, there is a once-daily commuter service from Dún Laoghaire Mallin to Dundalk Clarke, as well as a service from Bray to Drogheda MacBride. Additionally, some South Western Commuter services begin at Grand Canal Dock and continue as far as Hazelhatch and Celbridge.

The journey duration for DART services between Dublin Connolly and Greystones is approximately 49 to 59 minutes. For intercity services, the trip from Dublin Connolly to Rosslare Strand takes around 2 hours and 46 minutes.

This line connects at Dublin Connolly with the Enterprise service onwards to Belfast Grand Central and other Belfast line services, as well as with the Sligo Line for all stations to Sligo MacDiarmada. At Rosslare Europort, passengers can connect with Stena Line ferries to Fishguard Harbour for the West Wales Line and destinations like Carmarthen, Swansea, and Cardiff Central, or take Irish Ferries to Pembroke Dock.

==== Former services ====
The 05:35 service from Rosslare Europort to Dundalk Clarke, previously the longest train route on the island of Ireland by duration, was discontinued in the timetable change of September 2024. This service took 4 hours and 42 minutes, arriving in Dundalk Clarke at 10:17.

=== Freight services ===
No freight services operate on this route as of 2024. Up until 2002, ammonia and fertiliser trains operated from Shelton Abbey near Arklow, where a fertilizer plant was located. However, this closed in late 2002, since when there have been no regular freight trains on this line. Bagged cement trains also operated in the past to Arklow and Gorey.

=== Heritage services ===
On a few Sundays during the summer the Railway Preservation Society of Ireland operates the "Sea Breeze", a steam hauled train with heritage carriages, between Dublin and Wexford/Rosslare.

== Traction ==
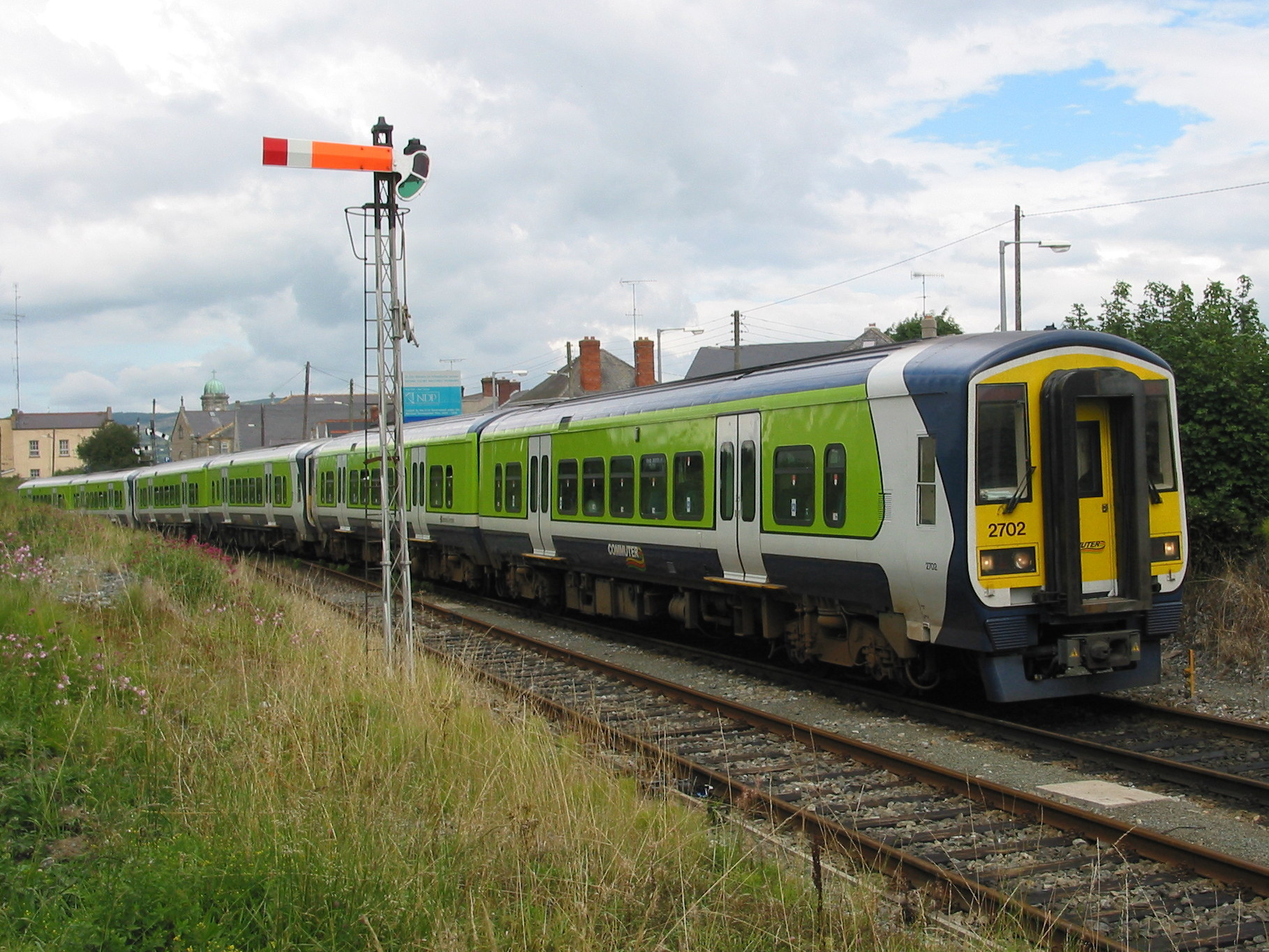
Now withdrawn 2700 Class DMU (2702) at Arklow

From late July 2004, Dublin-Rosslare services have been worked exclusively by diesel railcars. Initially the railcars used were drawn from the 2700 Class fleet, but these were replaced within a year. At present, most services are worked by the 22000 Class, of which there are four carriage sets, with the 29000 Class working some services. Prior to July 2004, services were worked by sets of Mark 2D carriages hauled by 071 class locomotives.

== Signalling ==
In April 2008, the signalling on this route was upgraded to the mini-CTC system, controlled from a signalling control centre at Greystones Station. Apart from the Limerick Junction station area on the Dublin-Cork route, which was itself upgraded to CTC in 2011, it had been the last of the routes radiating from Dublin to use Electric Train Staff (ETS) and semaphore signalling, which was still in place south of Wicklow up until April 2008.

Many of its signal cabins were situated on the corner of a footbridge. Examples include Wicklow, Rathdrum, Arklow and Gorey. At present these cabins remain in situ.

== Controversies ==
=== Terminating of Direct Rail Services (2024) ===
In early 2024, the National Transport Authority (NTA) proposed terminating direct rail services between Rosslare Europort and Dublin, suggesting that passengers transfer to DART services at Greystones or Wicklow. This proposal aimed to enhance service frequency and operational efficiency.

However, it faced criticism from various stakeholders. Fianna Fáil Senator Malcolm Byrne labelled the proposal as "short-sighted," expressing concerns about potential inconveniences for commuters and a decline in public transport attractiveness. Local councillors and rail users echoed these sentiments, fearing that mandatory transfers would deter passengers, particularly the elderly and those with mobility challenges.

As of December 2024, the NTA has not implemented the proposed changes, and direct services between Rosslare and Dublin continue to operate.

== Gallery ==
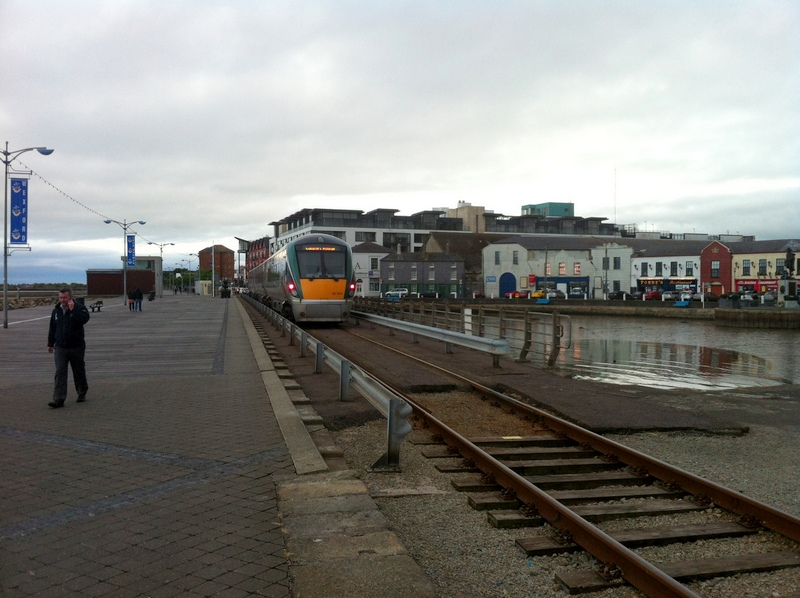
Rosslare-bound train on Wexford Quay

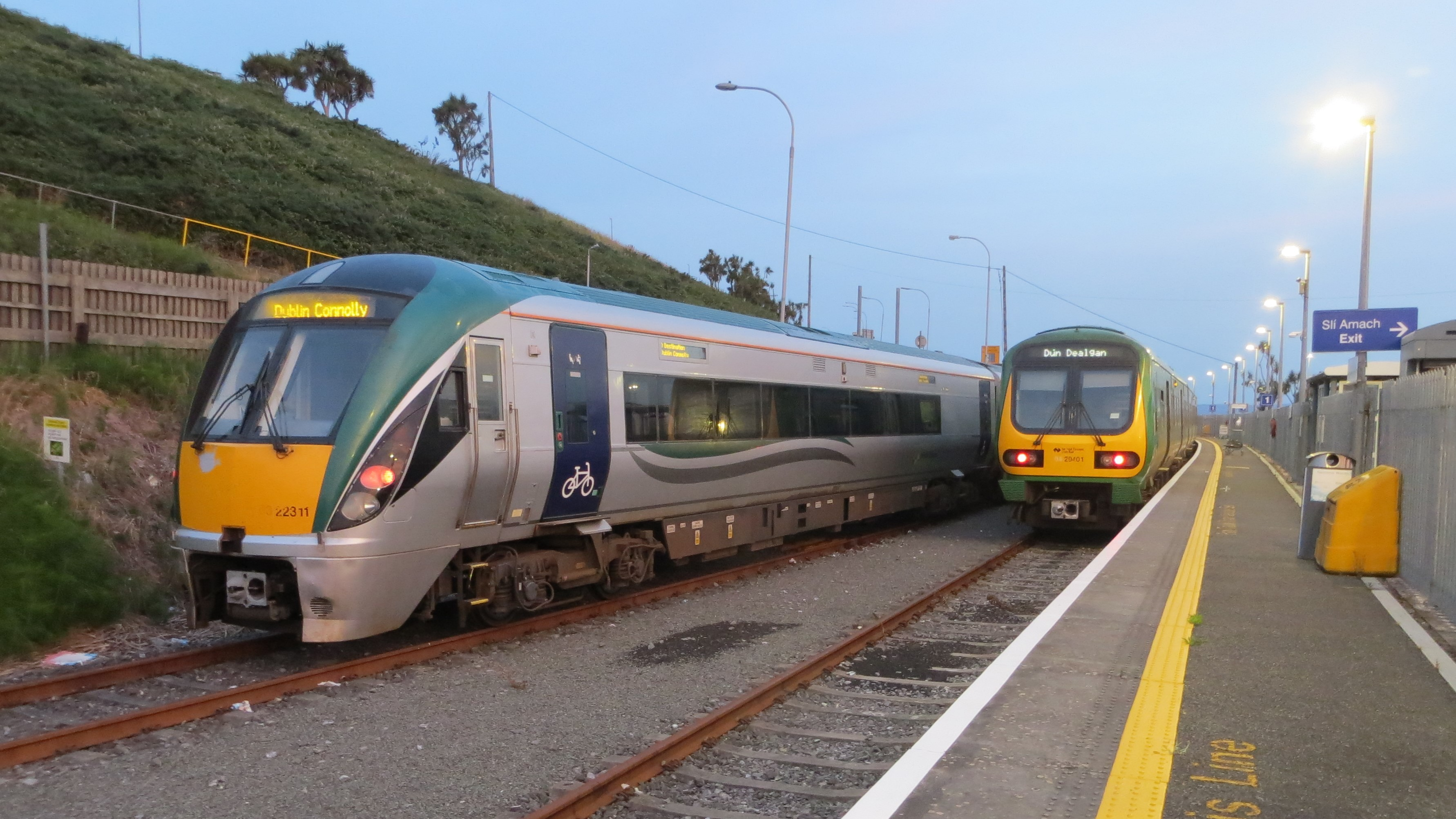
Rosslare Europort railway station - early morning trains to Dundalk and Dublin

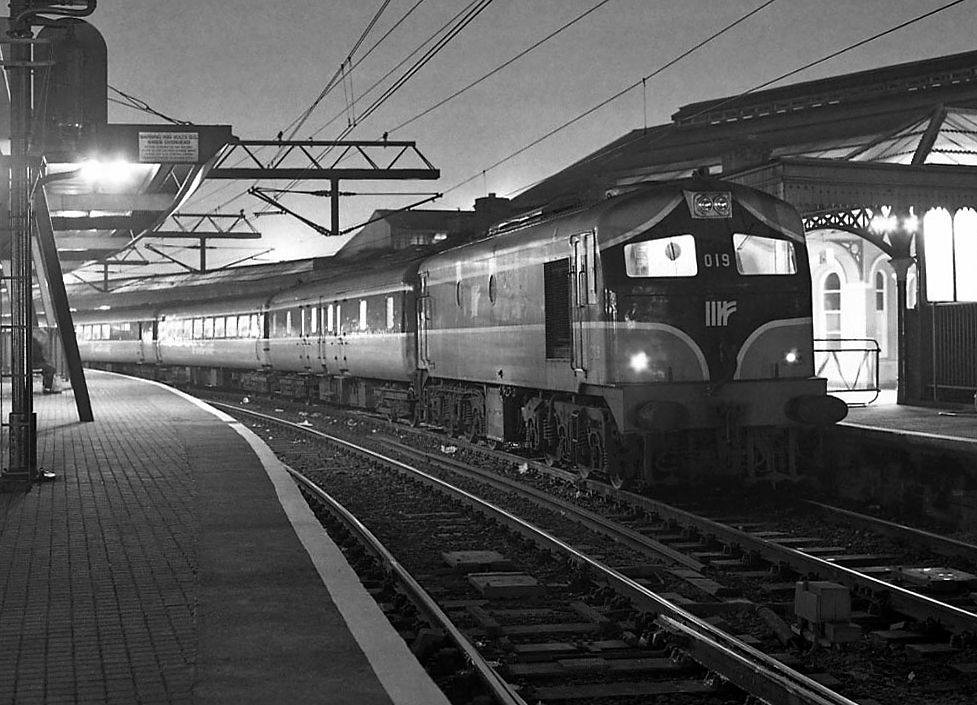
Train at Connolly Station

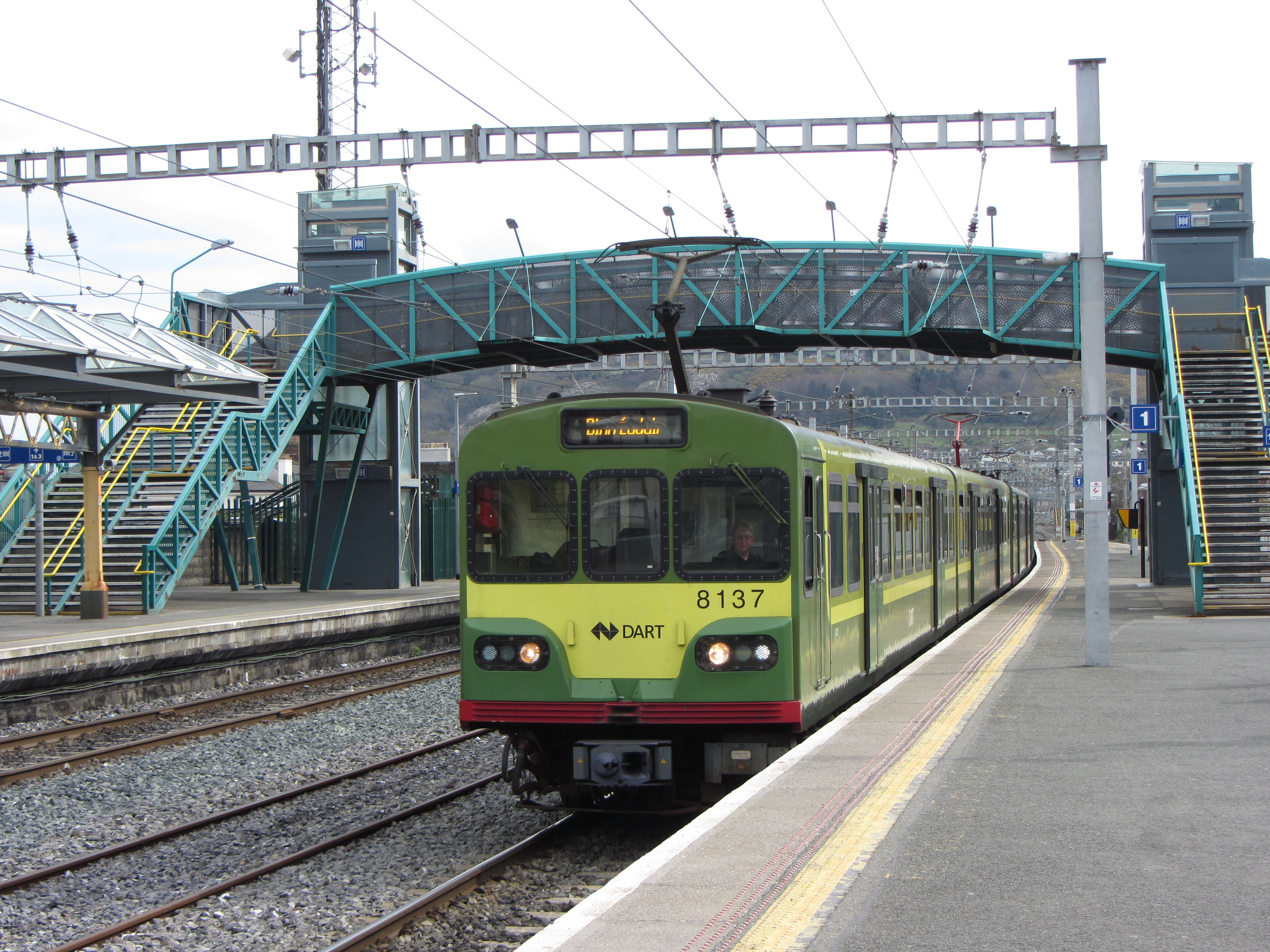
DART train entering Bray station

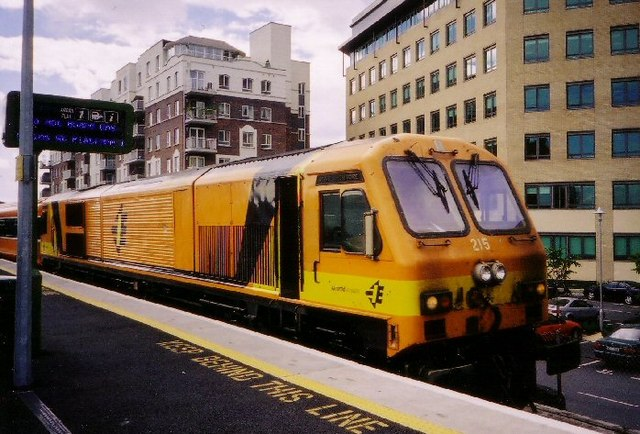
Iarnród Éireann train at Grand Canal Dock station

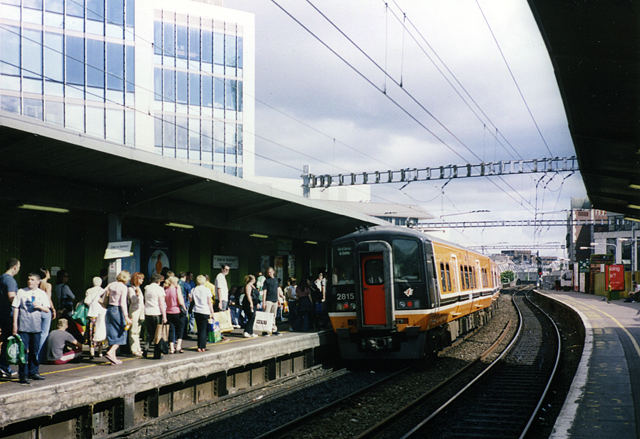
Trains at Tara Street

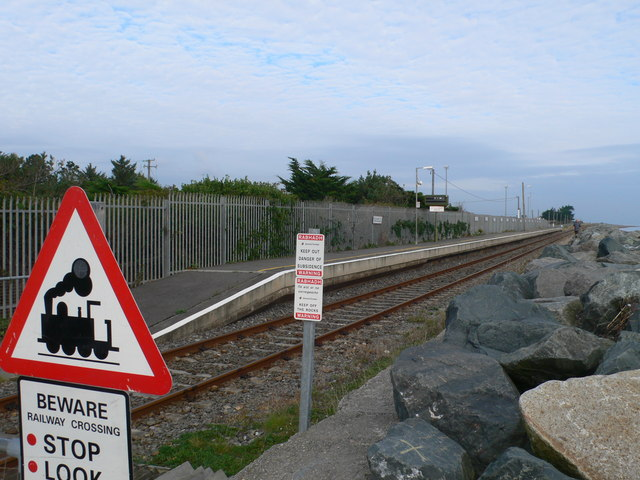
Kilcoole Station

== See also ==
- Dublin and South Eastern Railway
- Dublin and Kingstown Railway
- Iarnród Éireann
