= Shankill railway station (DW&WR) =

Railway station in Ireland

Shankill Seanchill
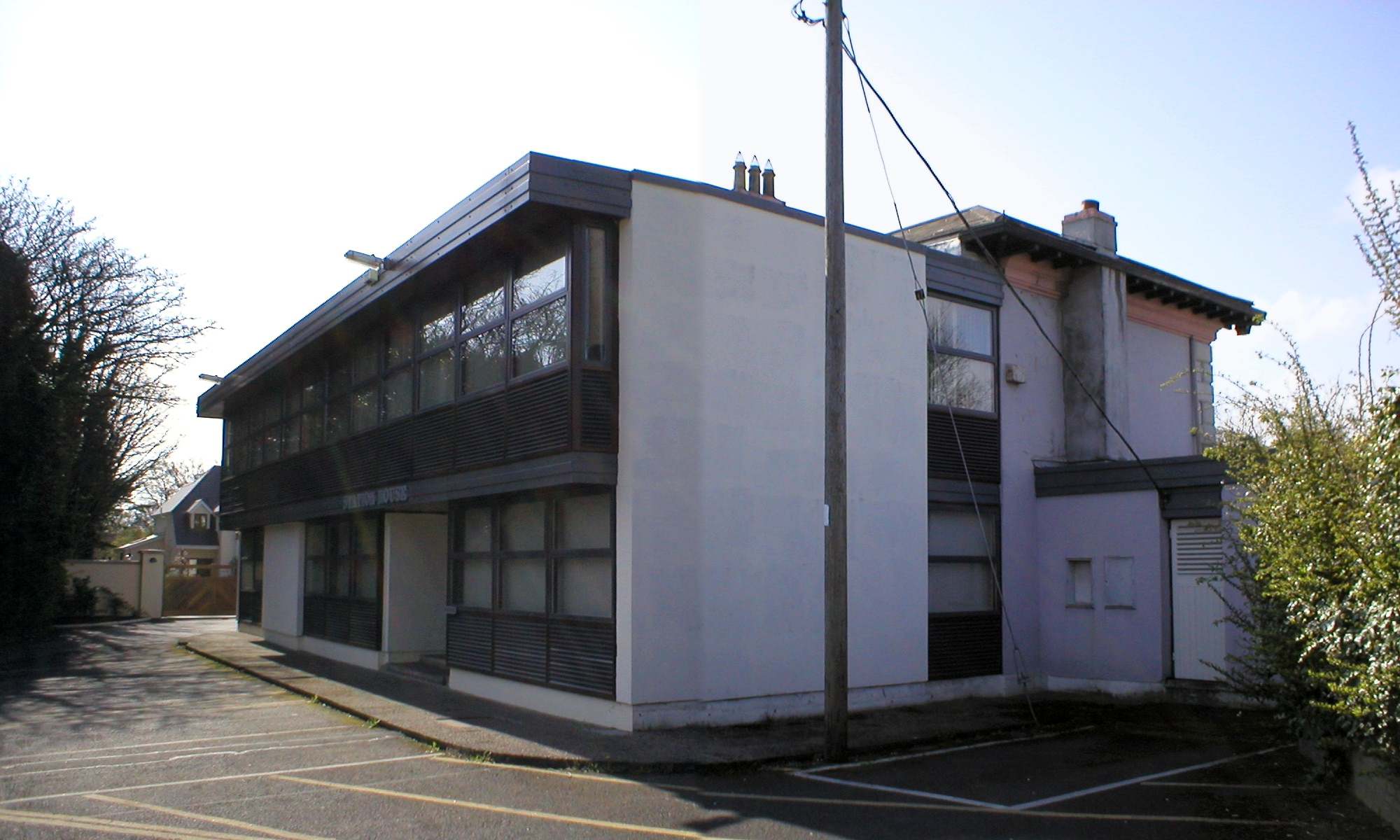
- Shankill DW&WR Station as redeveloped after closure, to rear of modern office addition

General information
- Location: Station Road, Shankill, Dublin 18, D18 XY38; Ireland
- Coordinates: 53.2345°N 6.1265°W
- Platforms: 2

Construction
- Structure type: At-grade

History
- Original company: Dublin, Wicklow and Wexford Railway
- Pre-grouping: Dublin and South Eastern Railway
- Post-grouping: Great Southern Railways

Key dates
- 10 July 1854: Station opens
- 31 December 1958: Station closed
Location

Shankill railway station was a station on the Harcourt Street railway line. It served the suburb of Shankill, in County Dublin, Ireland.

== History ==
Shankill was opened by the Dublin, Wicklow and Wexford Railway (DW&WR) on 10 July 1854 as part of the Harcourt Street line, initially Dundrum to Bray. It is situated on Station Road some 650 metres south-west of the current Shankill station. The next station to the south was Woodbrook Halt while to the north lay the Bride's Glen Viaduct and beyond that Carrickmines station. The station had a siding behind the southbound platform which served ore trucks from Glendalough, County Wicklow (which were transported to Rathdrum by horse and cart) for the Ballycorus Leadmines until its closure in 1913. In later years the siding was used for local goods traffic and horse boxes.

It has been noted the fastest timetabled run on the DW&WR in the 1880s was the 5.10 pm from Harcourt Street which was scheduled to achieve the 9 3/4 miles (15.7 km) to Shankill in 20 minutes at a rate of 29 1/4 miles per hour (47.1 km/h)

=== Closure ===
The Harcourt Street line had declined in use throughout the early 20th century and was becoming rundown in the 1940s and 50s. The station was closed by CIÉ with the closure of the whole line from Harcourt Street on 31 December 1958, much to objection from the local community.

=== The site today ===
The station building remains and facade was covered up during construction of the Shankill Business Centre during the 1970s. It still survives today as Station House and is a part of the business centre. A new Shankill station was opened in 1977 at Corbawn Lane on the coastal line from Pearse to Bray and is served by the DART.

== Gallery ==
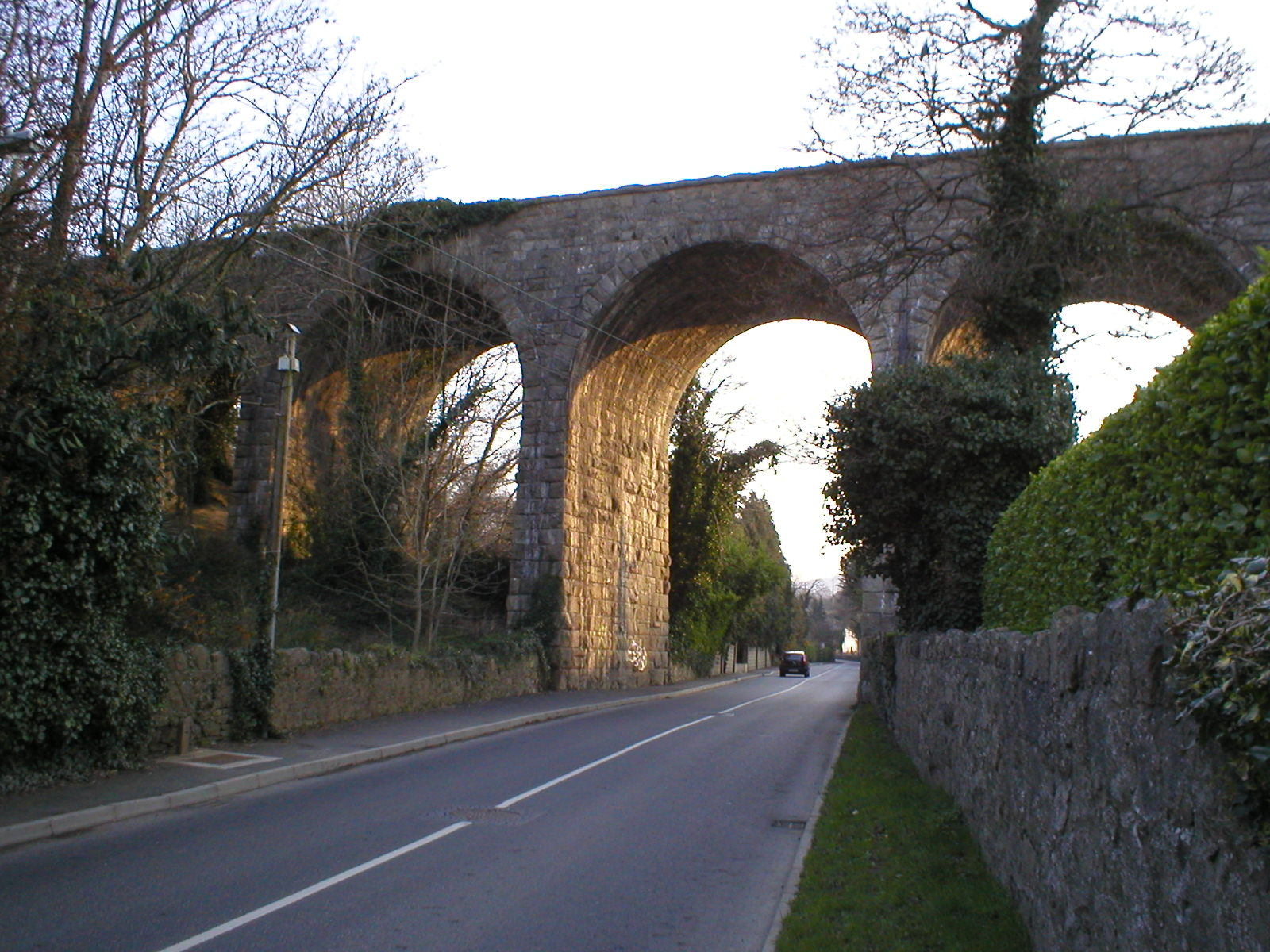
Bride's glen viaduct to the north of the station

== See also ==
- List of closed railway stations in Ireland

Preceding station	Disused railways	Following station
Carrickmines; Line and station closed	Dublin and South Eastern Railway; Harcourt Street line	Woodbrook; Line and station closed
