= Killiney railway station =

Railway station in County Dublin, Ireland

Killiney Cill Iníon Léinín
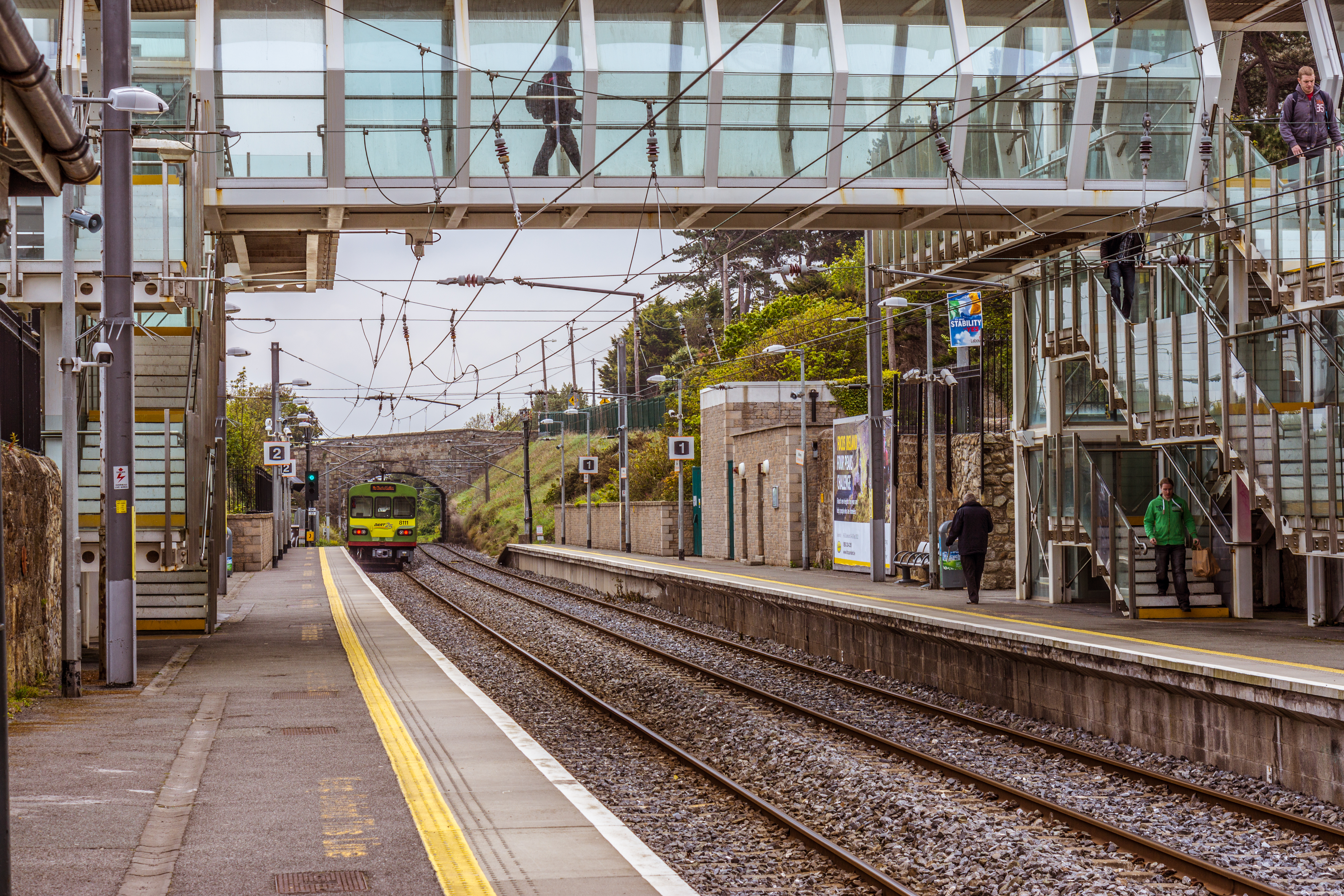
- Killiney station in 2012

General information
- Other names: Killiney & Ballybrack (until 1921)
- Location: Station Road, Killiney; County Dublin, A96 V0C2; Ireland
- Coordinates: 53.2554°N 6.1131°W
- Owner: Iarnród Éireann
- Operator: Iarnród Éireann
- Platforms: 2

Construction
- Structure type: At-grade
- Accessible: Yes

Other information
- Station code: KILNY
- Fare zone: Suburban 3

History
- Original company: Dublin and Wicklow Railway
- Pre-grouping: Dublin and South Eastern Railway
- Post-grouping: Great Southern Railways

Key dates
- 1 May 1858: First station opens as Killiney
- 6 May 1882: Second, relocated, station opens, as Killiney & Ballybrack, replacing the original Killiney and Ballybrack stations.
- 1921: Station renamed Killiney
- 1983: Station upgraded
- 2011: Station refurbished
- 2013: Station unstaffed
Location

Killiney railway station (Irish: Stáisiún Chill Iníon Léinín) is a station that serves Killiney in County Dublin, Ireland.

The station lies on the DART line. The entrance to the station is via Station Road. It is located about two minutes walk to Killiney Beach.

== History ==
The original station was located on nearby Strathmore Road. The current station opened on 6 May 1882 under the name Killiney & Ballybrack, replacing both Killiney and Ballybrack stations, the Ballybrack suffix was dropped in 1921, although the sign still featured the old name until 1983 when the station was upgraded. The original Killiney station had itself replaced the earlier Obelisk Hill, Killiney station on 1 January 1858.

The station was electrified in 1983 with the arrival of DART services. The station has been unstaffed since 2013 and it has two automatic ticket vending machines. A large pay and display car park is located across the road from the station.

== Services ==
As of 2023, the off-peak service pattern is as follows:

Northbound

- 3 tph to Howth.
- 3 tph to Malahide.

Southbound

- 6 tph to Bray Daly, of which 2 tph extend to Greystones.

Preceding station	Iarnród Éireann	Following station
Dalkey	DART	Shankill
	Historical railways	
Dalkey; Line and station open	Dublin and South Eastern Railway; Coastal line	Woodbrook Halt; Line open, station closed

== Bus Services ==
There is no public transport to or from the station. The nearest bus stop is in Ballybrack village, located one kilometre (0.62 mi) from the station. This is served by Go-Ahead Ireland routes 45a/45b from Kilmacanogue to Dun Laoghaire, via Bray.

== See also ==
- List of railway stations in Ireland
- Rail transport in Ireland
