= Glenageary railway station =

Railway station in Dublin, Ireland

Glenageary Gleann na gCaorach
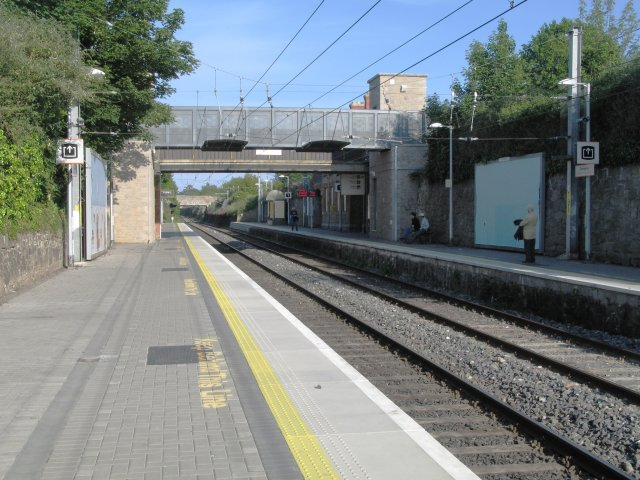
- Glenageary station looking South

General information
- Location: Station Road, Glenageary; County Dublin, A96 F2Y2; Ireland
- Coordinates: 53°16′53″N 6°7′26″W
- Owner: Iarnród Éireann
- Operator: Iarnród Éireann
- Platforms: 2
- Tracks: 2

Construction
- Structure type: In cutting
- Accessible: Yes

Other information
- Station code: GLGRY
- Fare zone: Suburban 2

History
- Opened: 1 November 1867
- Original company: Dublin, Wicklow and Wexford Railway
- Pre-grouping: Dublin and South Eastern Railway
- Post-grouping: Great Southern Railways

Key dates
- 1983: Station upgraded
- 2011: Station refurbished
Location

Glenageary railway station (Irish: Stáisiún Ghleann na gCaorach) serves Glenageary in Dún Laoghaire–Rathdown, Ireland.

It is beside 'The Metals' (na Ráillí), a walking and cycling route that runs from Killiney Hill to Dún Laoghaire station.

== History ==
The station opened on 1 November 1867, and was electrified in 1983 with the arrival of DART services.

== See also ==
- List of railway stations in Ireland

Preceding station	Iarnród Éireann	Following station
Sandycove & Glasthule	DART	Dalkey
