= Shanganagh Cemetery =

Cemetery in County Dublin, Ireland

Coordinates: 53.22106°N 6.11922°W

Shanganagh Cemetery is a cemetery in south County Dublin, in the administrative county of Dún Laoghaire–Rathdown just to the south of Shankill. The cemetery consists of two areas, on the Dublin Road, the other to the east, on the western side of the railway between Shankill and Bray. Both areas are bounded by Shanganagh Park (formerly Shanganagh Junction, which linked to the Harcourt Street line) to the north. It has an area of about 50 acres (200,000 m^{2}) and is a sister cemetery to Deans Grange Cemetery.

It holds the graves of Irish Taoiseach (Prime Minister of Ireland) Garret FitzGerald (1926–2011) and Albert Reynolds (1932–2014).
