= Woodbrook railway station =

Railway station in Dublin, Ireland

Woodbrook Sruthán na Coille
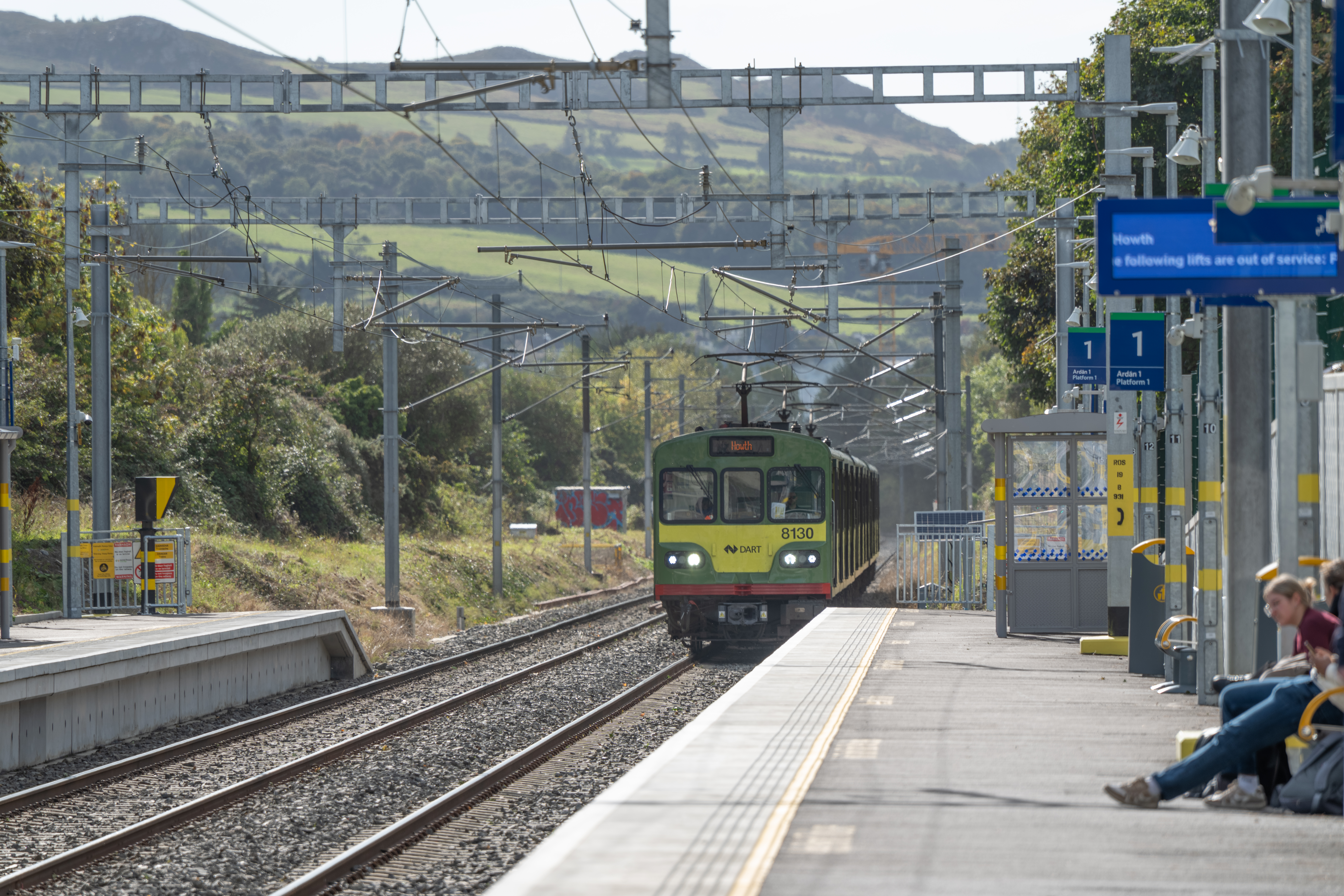
- Woodbrook DART station in 2025

General information
- Location: Shanganagh Road, Shankill, Dublin; Ireland
- Coordinates: 53.2183°N 6.1094°W
- Owner: Iarnrod Eireann
- Operator: DART
- Platforms: 2
- Tracks: 2

Construction
- Structure type: At-grade

Other information
- Station code: WBROK

History
- Original company: Dublin and South Eastern Railway
- Pre-grouping: Dublin and South Eastern Railway
- Post-grouping: Great Southern Railways

Key dates
- 1910: Station opens
- 1915: Station relocated inland
- 31 December 1958: Services to Harcourt Street cease
- 12 September 1960: Station closes
- 10 August 2025: Station reopens
Location

Woodbrook DART Station (Irish: Stáisiún DART Shruthán na Coille) is a station serving the DART line in the Shanganagh area of Dublin, Ireland. Construction of the new DART station started in November 2023, with the station officially opening on 10 August 2025.

Woodbrook Halt, located in the same area as the new DART station, was a former station on the Dublin and South Eastern Railway. Opened in 1910, this station closed in 1960. The halt served Shankill and Shanganagh, including the Woodbrook Estate from which it took its name, and lay a short distance north of Bray (at the northern edge of County Wicklow).

== History ==
Woodbrook Halt was opened as a halt in 1910. The small station was located on the main line, a few yards south of the split-off, thus receiving trains from both the coastal line and the Harcourt Street line. It served Sir Stanley Cochrane's Woodbrook estate, and especially his cricket ground. The Woodbrook Golf Club and Cricket Grounds later used this halt, from 1920 to 1960.

The part of the line between Killiney and Bray was moved inland in 1915 due to coastal erosion, with Shanganagh Junction being reinstated inland and Woodbrook station being relocated as a result.

The Harcourt Street line declined in use throughout the early 20th century and was closed by CIÉ on 31 December 1958. Being on the main line, Woodbrook survived the closure of the Harcourt Street line, until it too was closed in January 1960. The building at the halt was subsequently demolished and the platforms became overgrown.

== New station ==
A new station was planned for the area zoned for future housing development, with access to the proposed station included as part of a list of strategic infrastructure projects financed under the Local Infrastructure Housing Activation Fund in 2017. The proposed station is close to (but unconnected to) the former Woodbrook halt, the remains of which remain along the line at Woodbrook Golf Club.

In August 2020, Iarnród Éireann stated its intention to apply for planning permission for the station. An application was submitted in October 2020, and planning permission was granted in July 2021. Work on the new station had commenced by late 2023. In mid-2024, it was suggested that the new station could "open in 2025". In July 2025, it was announced that the station would reopen the following month, and the first trains served Woodbrook station on 10 August 2025.

== Gallery ==
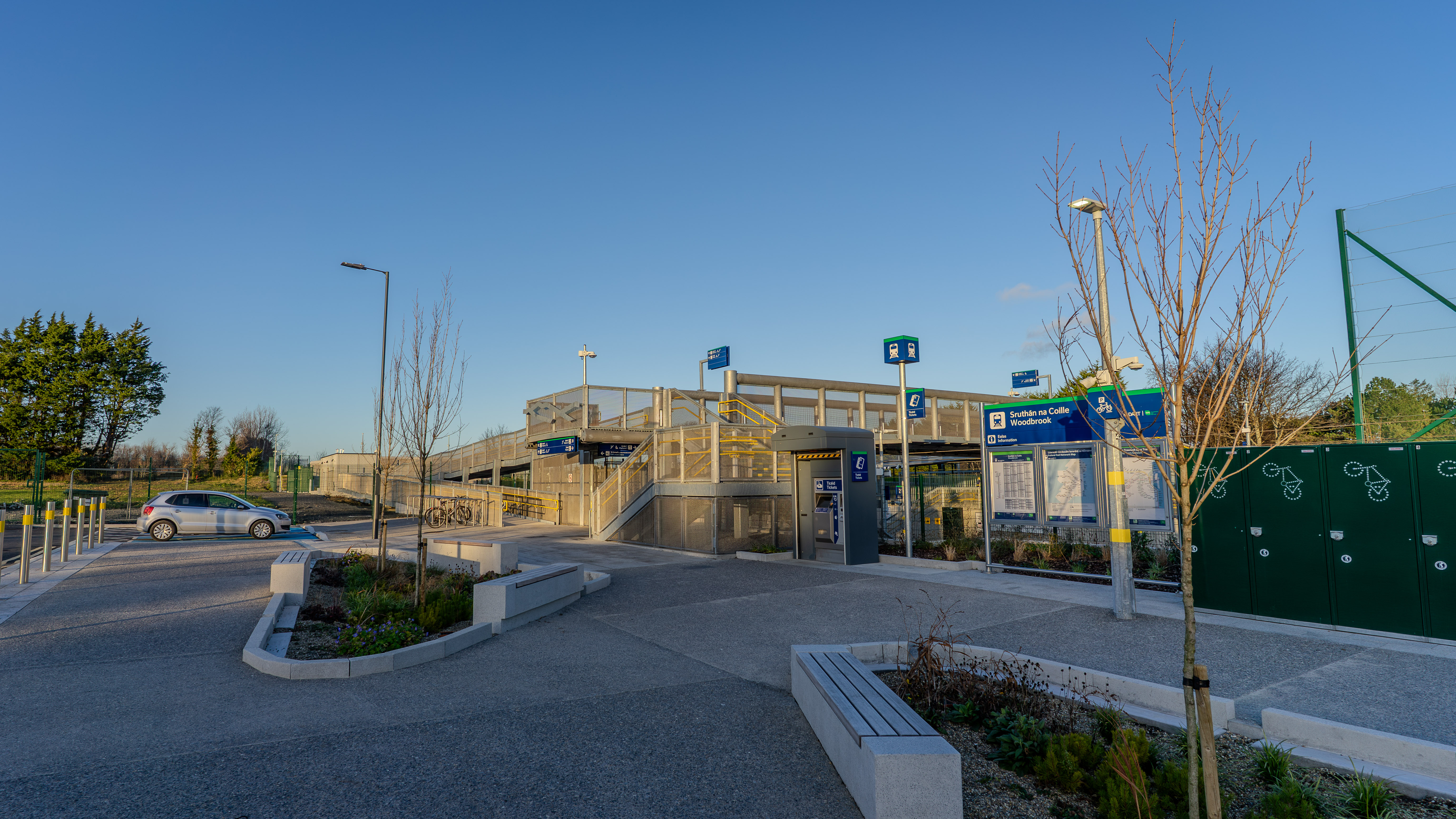
The exterior of Woodbrook DART station showing the accessible ramp, ticket machines, and green bicycle lockers.

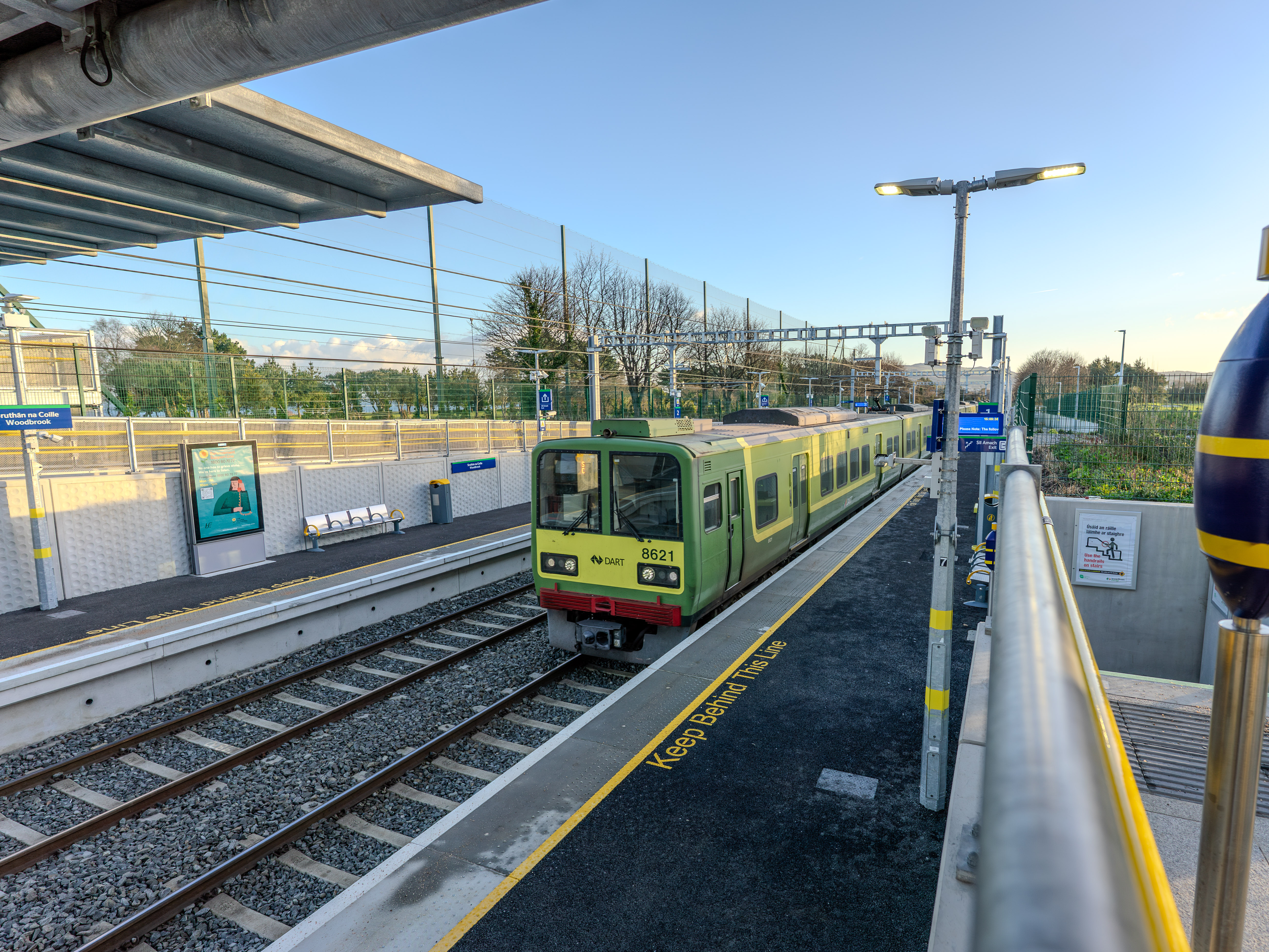
DART train (8600 Class) paused at the Northbound platform at Woodbrook station.

Preceding station	Iarnród Éireann	Following station
Shankill	DART; Trans-Dublin	Bray
	Disused railways	
Killiney and Ballybrack; Line and station open	Dublin and South Eastern Railway; Dublin-Wicklow	Bray; Line and station open
Shankill; Line and station closed	Dublin and South Eastern Railway; Dublin-Bray	Bray; Line closed, station open
