= Dalkey railway station =

Railway station in Dublin, Ireland

Dalkey Deilginis
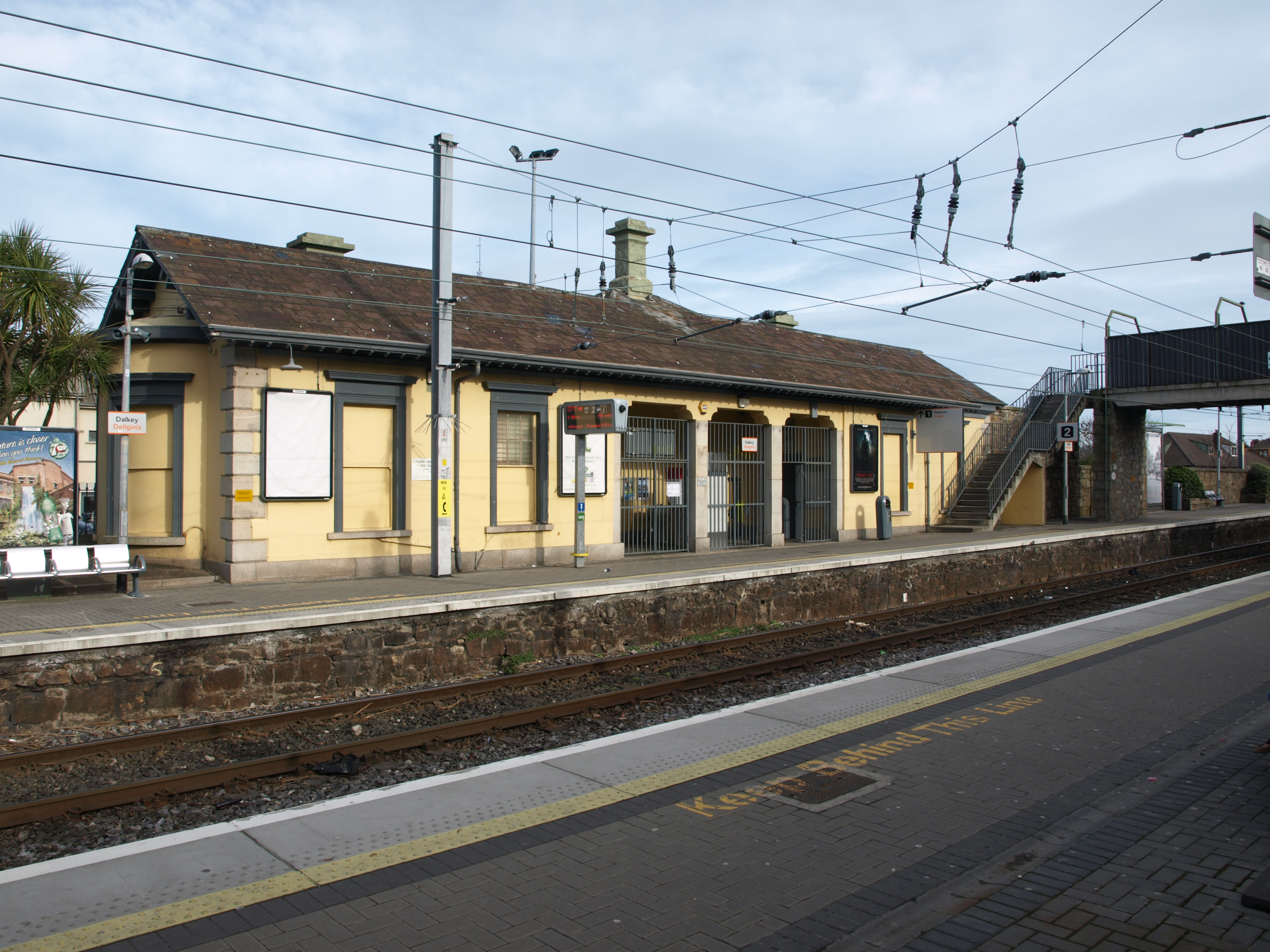
- Dalkey Station, Main Building as seen from platform 1

General information
- Location: Sorrento Drive, Dalkey; County Dublin, A96 TF10; Ireland
- Coordinates: 53°16′33″N 6°6′13″W
- Owner: Iarnród Éireann
- Operator: Iarnród Éireann
- Platforms: 2
- Tracks: 2

Construction
- Structure type: At-grade
- Parking: Yes
- Cycle facilities: Yes
- Accessible: Yes
- Architect: George Wilkinson

Other information
- Station code: DLKEY
- Fare zone: Suburban 2

History
- Opened: 10 July 1854
- Original company: Dublin, Wicklow and Wexford Railway
- Pre-grouping: Dublin and South Eastern Railway
- Post-grouping: Great Southern Railways

Key dates
- 30 March 1964: Station closes for goods traffic
- 1983: Station upgraded
- 23 July 1984: DART services commence
- 2011: Station refurbished
Location

Dalkey railway station (Irish: Stáisiún Dheilginis) is a railway station that serves Dalkey in Dún Laoghaire–Rathdown, Ireland.

== History ==
Dalkey was initially served by the Dalkey Atmospheric Railway station located 850 metres north of the current station, which opened on 29 March 1844 and closed on 12 April 1854. The current station was opened on 10 July 1854 when the Dublin and Wicklow Railway opened their coastal branch from Bray to Kingstown (later Dún Laoghaire) and took over the atmospheric railway. The coastal line later took over the Dublin and Kingstown Railway in 1857, bringing services to Westland Row (later Pearse) in Dublin.

The station building was designed by George Wilkinson to a similar design to Dundrum. A small goods yard adjacent to the southbound platform closed for goods traffic on 30 March 1964. The station later became part of the DART on 23 July 1984.

== Services ==
As of 2023, the peak service pattern is as follows:

Northbound

- 3 tph to Howth.
- 3 tph to Malahide.

Southbound

- 6 tph to Bray Daly, of which 2 tph extend to Greystones.

The information office is open between 07:00-10:00 AM, Monday to Friday.

Preceding station	Iarnród Éireann	Following station
Glenageary	DART	Killiney
	Disused railways	
Kingstown and Sandycove; Line and station open	Dublin and Wicklow Railway; Coastal line	Obelisk Hill; Line open, station closed

== Connections ==
There is no public transport to or from the station, but the nearest bus stop is located three hundred and fifty metres (1,150 ft) from the station, on the other end of the village. This is served by Dublin Bus routes 7D/7E from Mountjoy Square to Dalkey via Dún Laoghaire, Go-Ahead Ireland routes 59 from Killiney to Dún Laoghaire and 111 from Dalkey to Brides Glen Luas stop in Cherrywood, via Dún Laoghaire and the Aircoach route 703 from Killiney Castle to Dublin Airport.

== Accidents and incidents ==
- On 16 November 1979, a passenger train collided with a stationary passenger train. Thirty-six people were injured.

== See also ==
- List of railway stations in Ireland

== Sources ==
- Shepherd, Ernie (1974). The Dublin & South Eastern Railway (1974 ed.). David and Charles. ISBN 0715363611.
