= Kilcoole railway station =

Railway station in Kilcoole, Ireland

Kilcoole Cill Chomhghaill
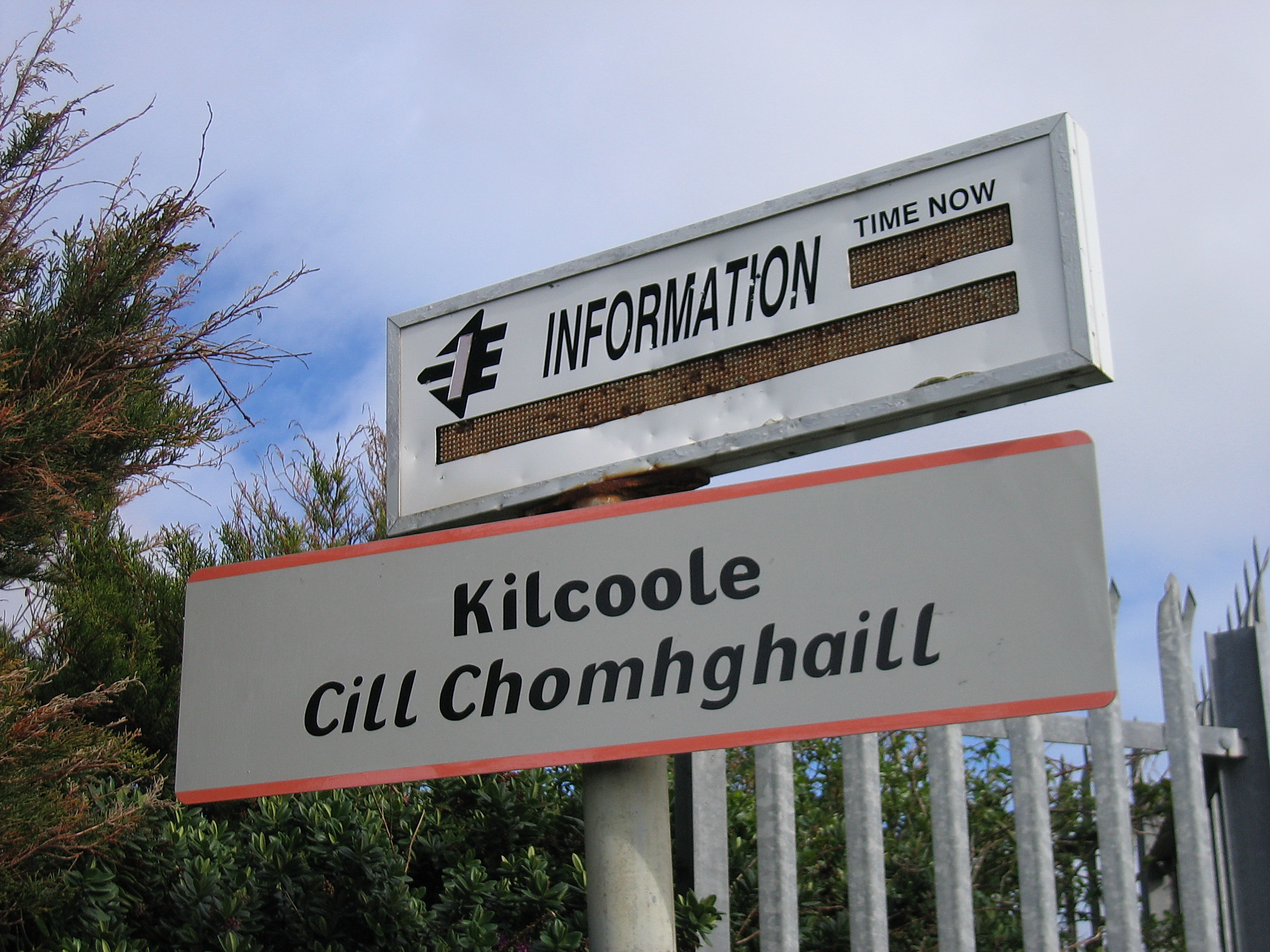
- Entrance to Kilcoole railway station

General information
- Other names: Kilcool and Newtownmountkennedy
- Location: Sea Road, Kilcoole, County Wicklow; Ireland
- Coordinates: 53°6′23″N 6°2′28″W
- Owner: Iarnród Éireann
- Operator: Iarnród Éireann
- Platforms: 1
- Tracks: 1

Construction
- Structure type: At-grade
- Parking: Yes
- Accessible: Yes

Other information
- Station code: KCOOL, 139
- Fare zone: Suburban 5

History
- Original company: Dublin, Wicklow and Wexford Railway
- Pre-grouping: Dublin and South Eastern Railway
- Post-grouping: Great Southern Railways

Key dates
- 30 October 1855: Opened as Kilcool and Newtownmountkennedy
- 1880: Renamed Kilcool
- 1890: The original platform, seaward side, washed away by sea
- 9 June 1947: Goods services cease
- 30 March 1964: Closed
- 8 June 1980: Reopened as Kilcoole
Location

Kilcoole railway station (Irish: Stáisiún Chill Chomghaill) is a railway station in Kilcoole, County Wicklow, Ireland. The station serves the village of the same name and the nearby village of Newtownmountkennedy.

== History ==
The station was opened on 30 October 1855 by the Dublin, Wicklow and Wexford Railway as Kilcool. The station was closed in 1964 due to a lack of resources or use. It reopened on 2 November 1980, renamed Kilcoole.

== Location ==
The station is located on Kilcoole Beach, right beside the coastline. Kilcoole village is 1.6 km from the station, while Newtownmountkennedy is 6 km from the station.

== Road transport ==
There is no public road transport to or from the station. The nearest bus stop is on Sea Road, about 600m from the station, which is served by Go-Ahead Ireland route L2 (Newcastle to Bray Station).

There is a free car-park, located to the west of the station's platform.

== Facilities and services ==
The station has one through platform and is unstaffed. A ticket machine and wheelchair ramp were added between 2020 and 2024. A schedule change in 2025 improved service, and now all trains on the Dublin-Rosslare line stop at Kilcoole, in both directions.

The DART+ programme is planned to bring hourly train services to Kilcoole station.

Preceding station	Iarnród Éireann	Following station
Greystones	InterCity; Dublin-Rosslare railway line limited service	Wicklow
Greystones	Commuter; South Eastern Commuter limited service	Wicklow
	Disused railways	
Greystones & Delgany	Dublin and South Eastern Railway; Dublin-Rosslare	Newcastle; Line open, station closed

== Gallery ==
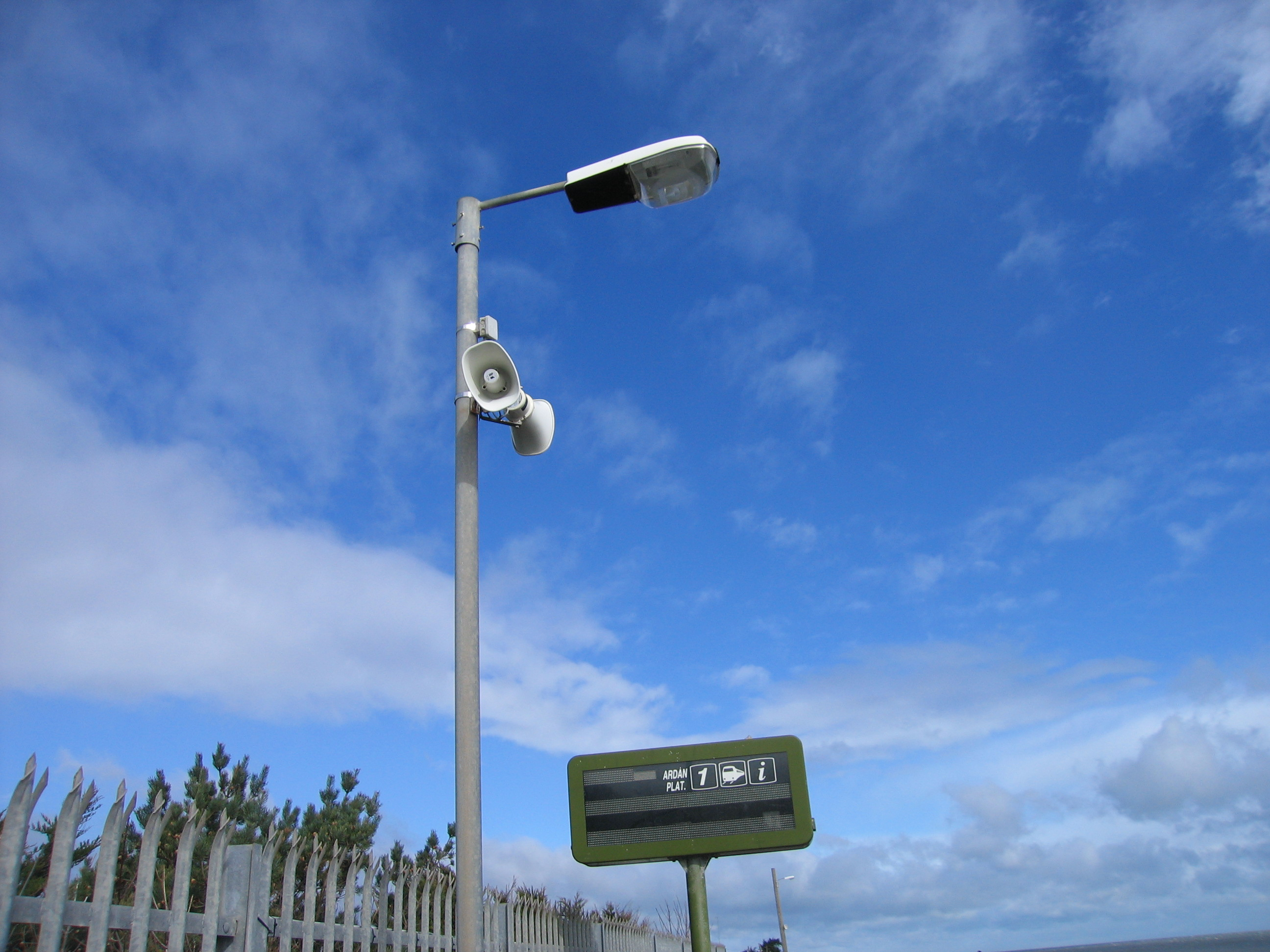
Information

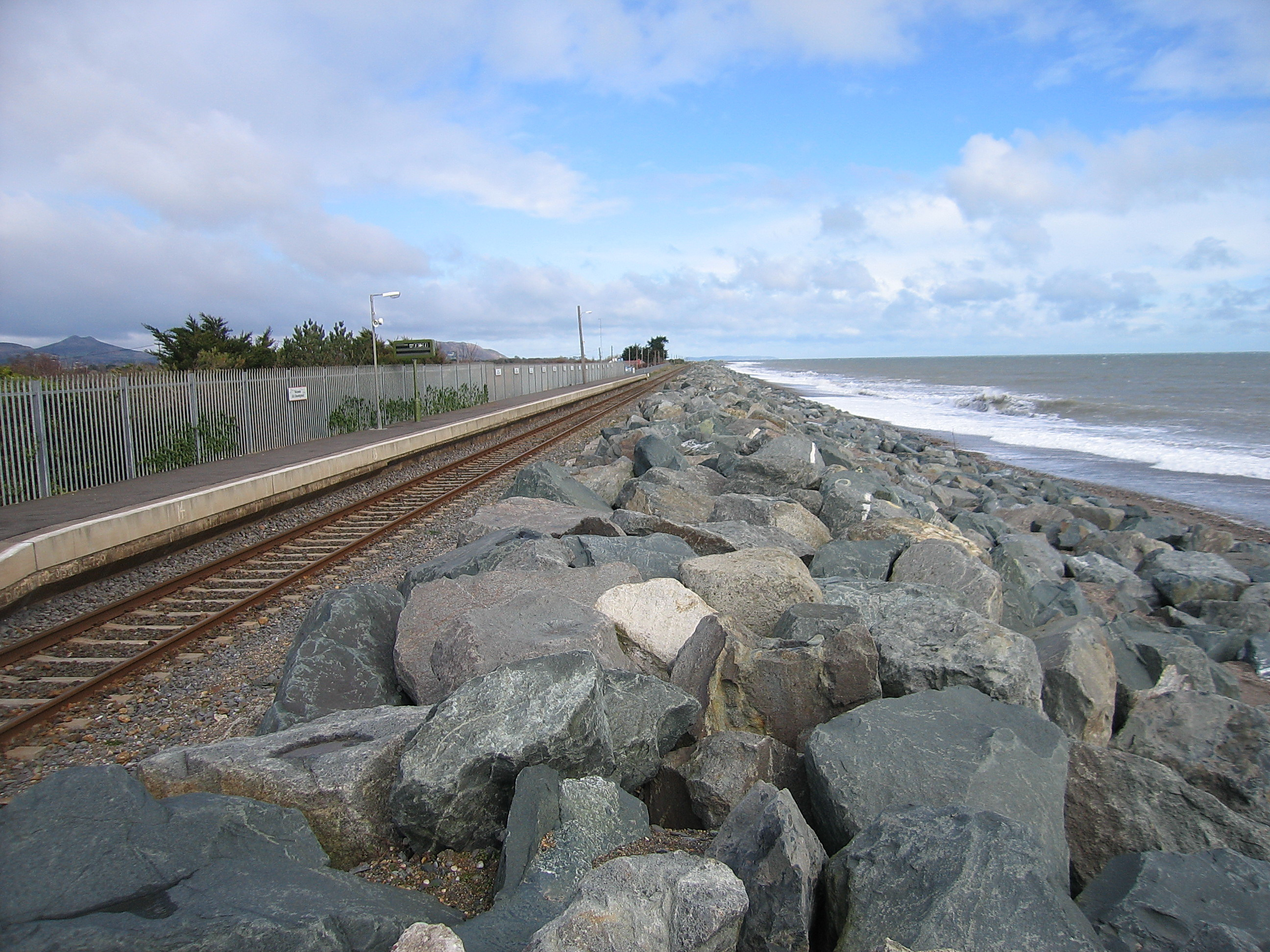
Protection

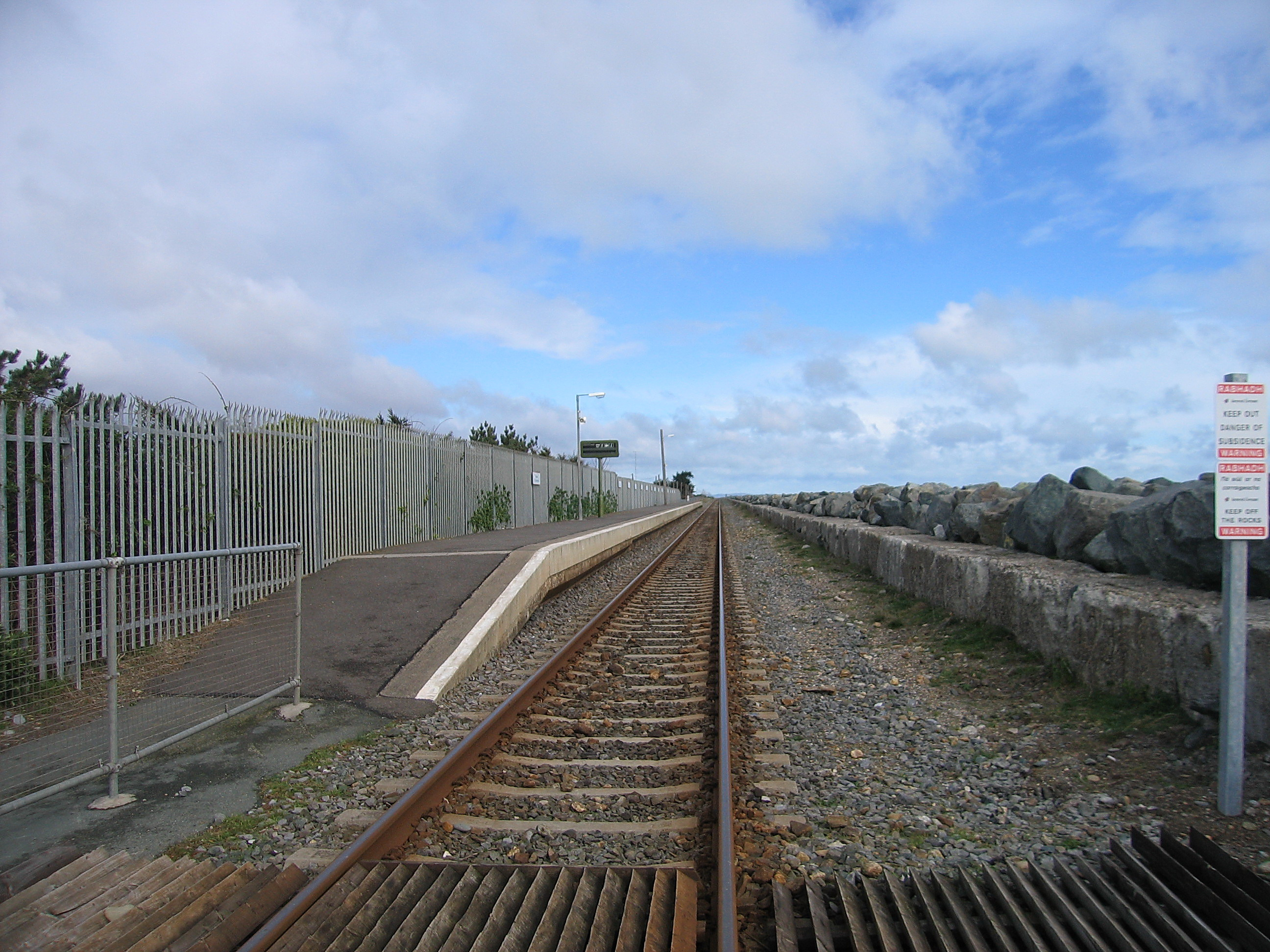
Platform

== See also ==
- List of railway stations in Ireland
