= Bray Cove Halt railway station =

Railway station in County Wicklow, Ireland

Bray Cove Halt
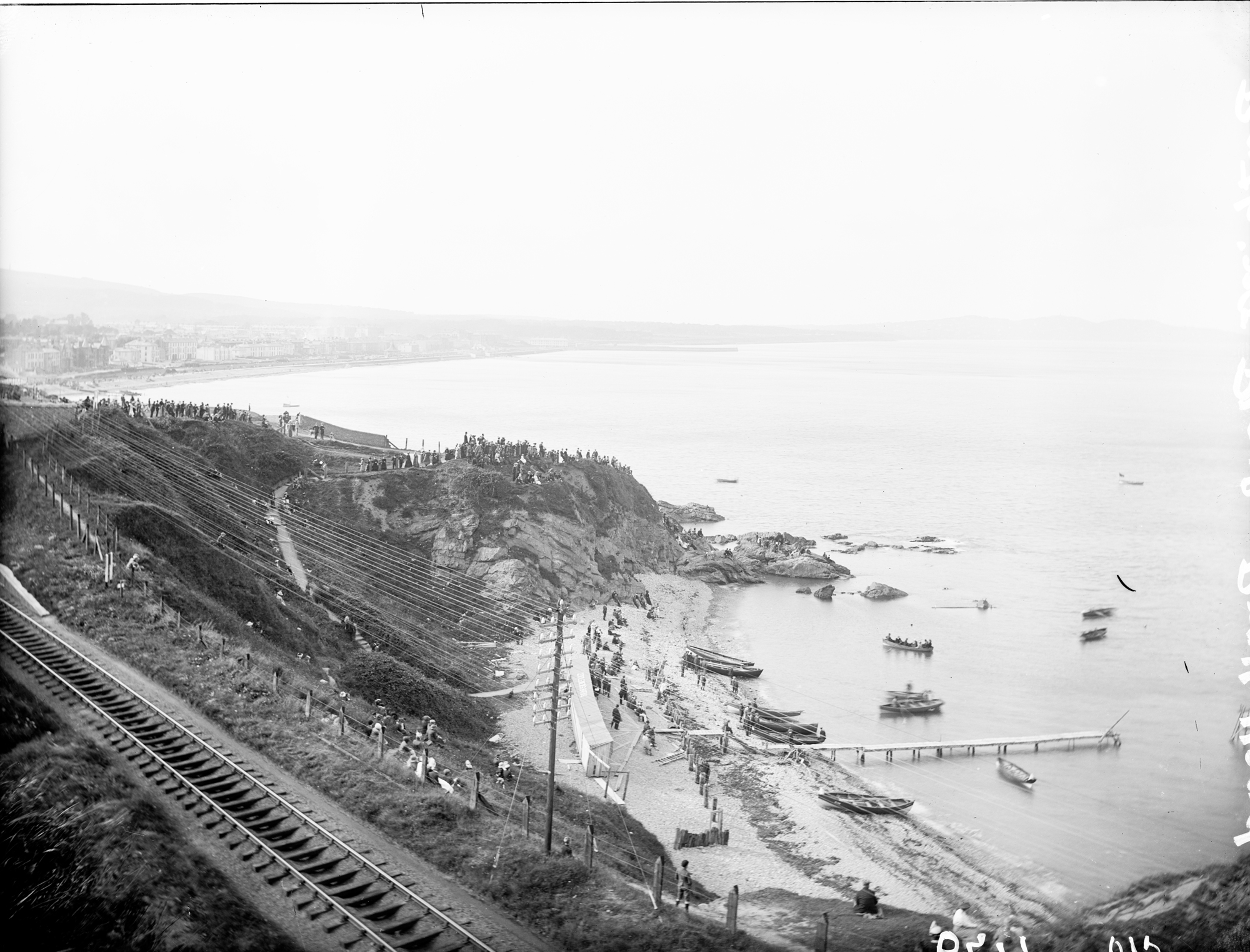
- c. 1907 – 1914

General information
- Location: Bray, County Wicklow; Ireland

History
- Opened: 1906
- Closed: 1929
- Original company: Dublin, Wicklow and Waterford Railway
- Pre-grouping: Dublin and South Eastern Railway
- Post-grouping: Great Southern Railways

Key dates
- 3 September 1906: Station opens
- September 1908: Station closes
- June 1929: Station reopens
- August 1929: Station closes

Bray Cove Halt railway station served a cove to the south of the town of Bray in County Wicklow, Ireland. The station was also known as Naylor's Cove Halt.

The station opened on 3 September 1906, and closed finally in August 1929. The station was only open for two short periods, the first of 2 years, the second of only 2 months.

== Routes ==
Preceding station	Disused railways	Following station
Bray	Dublin and South Eastern Railway; Dublin-Rosslare	Greystones & Delgany
