= Rathdrum railway station =

Station in County Wicklow, Ireland

Rathdrum Ráth Droma
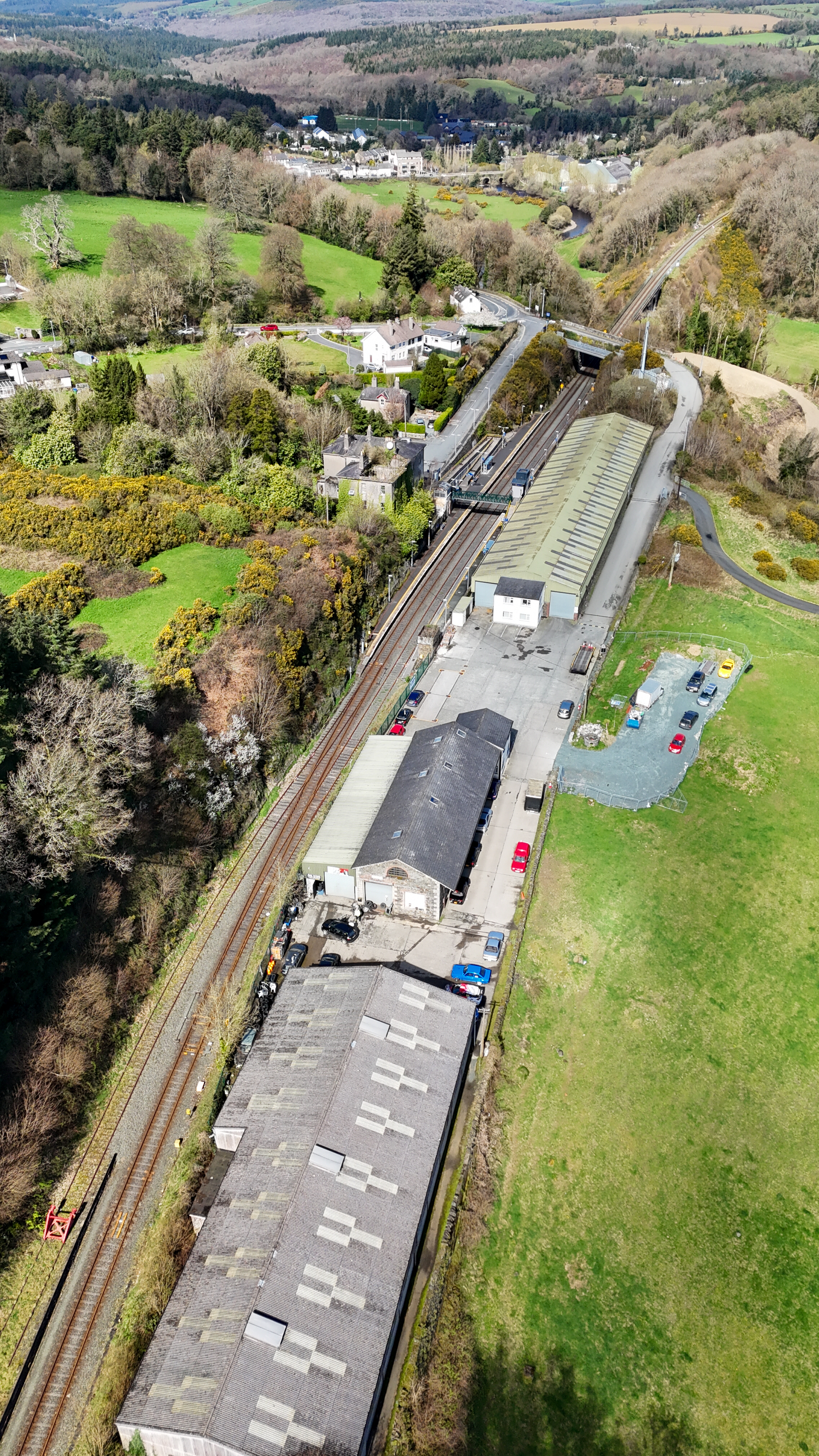
- Rathdrum Station in 2026

General information
- Location: Corballis Lower, Rathdrum; County Wicklow, A67 R820; Ireland
- Coordinates: 52.9303°N 6.2262°W
- Owner: Iarnród Éireann
- Operator: Iarnród Éireann
- Platforms: 2

Construction
- Structure type: At-grade
- Accessible: Yes

Other information
- Station code: RDRUM
- Fare zone: F

History
- Opened: 18 July 1863
- Original company: Dublin, Wicklow and Wexford Railway
- Pre-grouping: Dublin and South Eastern Railway
- Post-grouping: Great Southern Railways
Location

Rathdrum railway station (Irish: Stáisiún Ráth Droma) is a railway station in Rathdrum, County Wicklow, Ireland.

== History ==
It opened on 18 July 1863, replacing the terminus at Rathdrum (Kilcommon) (opened 20 August 1861) when the line was extended.

== Description ==
It is a two-platform station with a passing loop, and water tower at the south end of one platform. There is a tunnel to the south and a viaduct to the north of the station.

The station is unstaffed, and has commuter and InterCity trains to Dublin Connolly and Rosslare Europort.

There used to be a third platform and a goods area, which is now a small industrial area.

== Services/routes ==
The service from the station is:

Monday to Friday

- 6 trains per day to Dublin Connolly via Bray Daly (one continuing to Dundalk Clarke)
- 4 trains per day to Rosslare Europort via Arklow
- 1 train per day to Wexford O'Hanrahan via Arklow
- 1 train per day to Gorey

Saturdays

- 4 trains per day to Dublin Connolly via Bray Daly (one continuing to Dundalk Clarke)
- 3 trains per day to Rosslare Europort via Arklow

Sundays

- 3 trains per day to Dublin Connolly via Bray Daly
- 3 trains per day to Rosslare Europort via Arklow

Preceding station	Iarnród Éireann	Following station
Wicklow	InterCity; Dublin-Rosslare railway line	Arklow
Wicklow	Commuter; South Eastern Commuter	Arklow
	Disused railways	
Glenealy; Line open, station closed	Dublin and South Eastern Railway; Dublin-Rosslare	Avoca; Line open, station closed

== Transport ==
The Wicklow Way bus service operates two routes linking Rathdrum railway station and Rathdrum with Glendalough and Tinahely respectively. The bus timetable is integrated with the train timetable.

Bus Eireann route 133, from Wicklow to Dublin Airport, stops outside Suttons in Rathdrum, which is located 650 m from the station.

== See also ==
- List of railway stations in Ireland
