= Killiney Hill =

Hill on Dublin Bay, Ireland

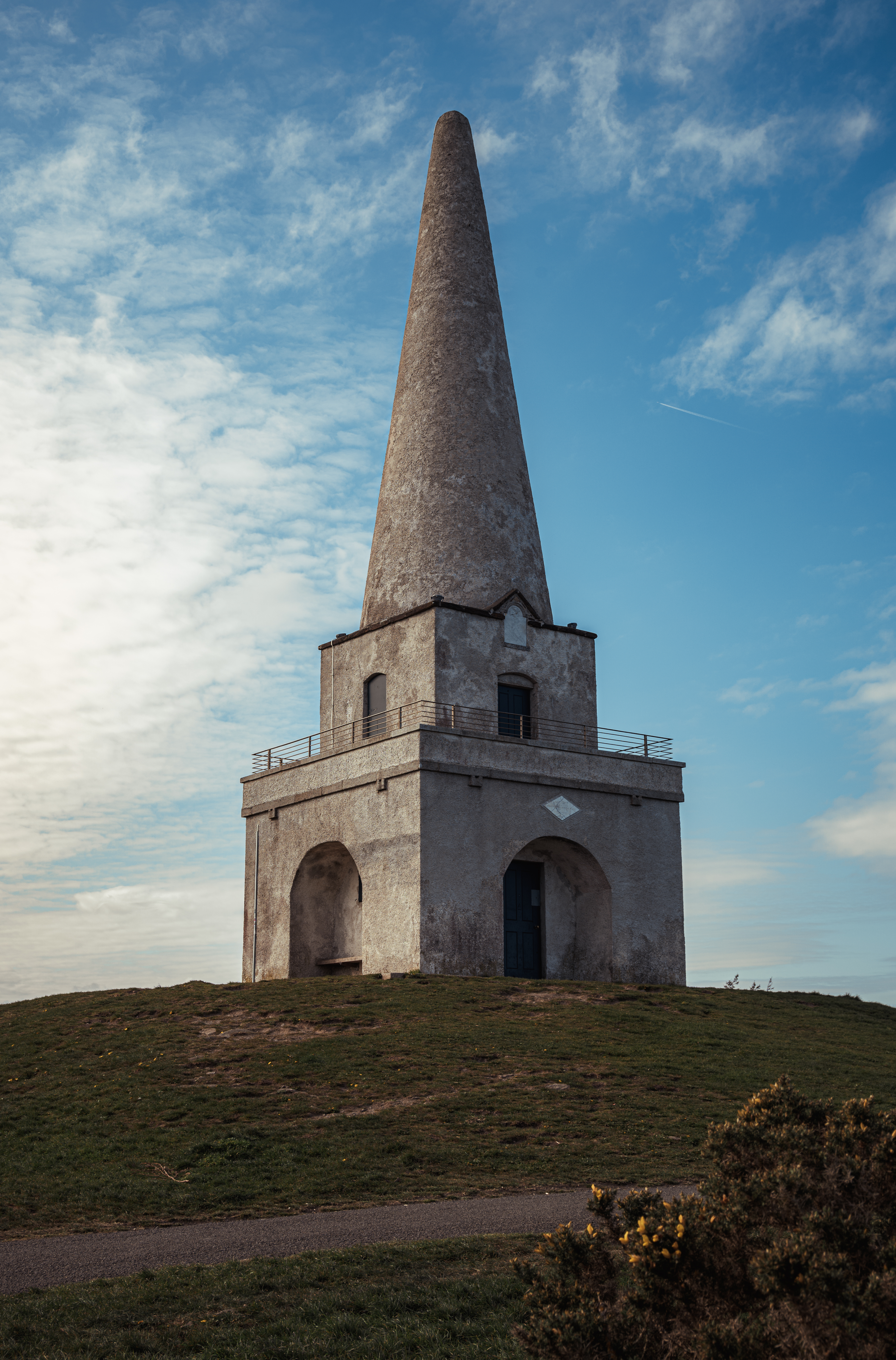
An obelisk on Killiney Hill bears the inscription: "Last year being hard with the poor, walks about these hills and this were erected by John Mapas, June 1742."

Killiney Hill (Irish: Cnoc Chill Iníon Léinín) is the southernmost of the two hills which form the southern boundary of Dublin Bay, the other being Dalkey Hill. These two hills form part of Killiney Hill Park. The park overlooks the villages of Dalkey to the north and Killiney to the west.

Crowned by a monument, Killiney Hill is 153 metres high and has views over the surrounding areas: Dublin to the northwest; the Irish Sea and the mountains of Wales (on a clear day) to the east and southeast; and Bray Head and the Wicklow Mountains to the south. The hill was higher in the past but material was removed from the summit for the construction of the pier at Dún Laoghaire. The obelisk was completed in 1742 and commemorates the victims of the Irish Famine of 1740-41.

== History ==
Killiney Hill, c. 1840

Killiney Hill stands in the former townland of Mount Mapas, or Scalpwilliam, first mentioned under that name in the beginning of the 17th century. Former residents included Captain Edward Maunsell, who served as the High Sheriff of County Dublin in 1755, followed by Colonel the Hon. Henry Loftus, MP for Bannow in County Wexford. Loftus planted the hill and built nearby roads. In 1790, Lord Clonmell lived here and constructed a park which he filled with deer.

In 1834, Robert Warren, a wealthy solicitor, bought the 155-acre Mount Malpas estate on Killiney Hill for £7,000 and developed additional properties on the hill. In the late 1830s, Warren was approached by Valentine Hosking, an architect, engineer and surveyor, who suggested that the men could establish a new town on the hill called Queenstown, in honour of Queen Victoria who had come to power in 1837. Additionally, a chalybeate spring on the Killiney lands which was found to be rich in iron salts had the potential to help the prospective Queenstown operate as a spa town, similar to the popular Tunbridge Wells in Kent, and could attract English tourists. The proposed Queenstown Joint Stock Building Company published a detailed prospectus on 12 June 1841:

The want of a first-rate watering place in the vicinity of the metropolis has long been the surprise of visitors, while so many towns of a similar description have been established within a few years in England and other countries, on sites very inferior to the one selected for Queenstown, and with great profit to the shareholders. It is presumed, from want of such an establishment, and the very high rent obtained for building ground and houses in the vicinity... that a very large profit will accrue to the shareholders in the purchase of the estate, the formation of roads and pleasure grounds, the selling or leasing the frontage for building, and in carrying out the whole design, or part thereof, by a building company.

The names of the new roads to be built as part of Queenstown included Victoria Road, Albert Road and the Royal Crescent, which "no doubt reflected (Warren's) political loyalty but may also have been designed to appeal to a British audience", as the share list was opened in London as well as Dublin. The project ran into difficulties and eventually collapsed in February 1842. After his death in 1869, Warren's lands at Killiney were sold in the Landed Estates Court.

Killiney Hill Park was purchased by the Queen Victoria Memorial Association from Robert Warren Jr for £5,000 and was opened as a public park by Prince Albert Victor of Wales in 1887, in memory of Queen Victoria's Jubilee, and called Victoria Hill.

The park is crossed by a number of walking tracks, and with views in all directions, is used by walkers and hikers from the surrounding areas.

In early times this area was included in the lands of Rochestown and Dalkey Commons and belonged for many centuries to the Norman family of Talbot (the same Talbot of Malahide Castle) and through them the property passed eventually to Colonel John Malpas who, in the early eighteenth century, built a brick house for himself at Rochestown.

The "Wishing Stone" of Killiney Hill is located to the north-east of the obelisk, alongside a smaller obelisk, known locally as "Boucher’s Monument" - ‘A tourist in 1796 mentions that a memorial was about to be placed on the hill, in pursuance of the will of the last Mr. Mapas, who left a large sum for the erection of a monument to his family.’

== Obelisk Hill halt ==
Obelisk Hill Halt

General information
- Location: Vico Road, Killiney, County Dublin, Ireland
- Coordinates: 53.2699°N 6.0973°W
- Platforms: 1

Construction
- Structure type: At-grade

History
- Pre-grouping: Dublin and Wicklow Railway

Key dates
- 10 July 1854: Station opens
- 31 December 1857: Station closed
Location

Obelisk Hill Halt was located between Dalkey and Ballybrack stations on a section of the Dublin and Wicklow Railway's coastal branch. The station was named after the nearby obelisk, located on the hill above the bay. The Dublin and Wicklow Railway opened the station one year after constructing their line from Dún Laoghaire to Bray in 1854. The station only had one platform located on the down side of the line, as the line between Dalkey and Killiney was originally built as single track. The station also featured a footbridge, and was accessed from the parallel Vico Road above the railway. A walled pathway also existed on the seaward side, giving access to a small cove. This allowed sea bathers continued access to the shore, which the new railway would otherwise have prevented. Obelisk Hill closed on 1 January 1858 and was replaced by the original Killiney railway station at Strathmore Rd. Today, only one of the footbridge piers at the former station site remain, as does the now crumbling walled pathway on the seaward side. At the southern end of the station site is a footbridge over the railway at Whiterock beach, while at the northern end is the southern portal of Dalkey Tunnel. The line between Dalkey and Killiney was eventually doubled in 1882.

Preceding station	Historical railways	Following station
Dalkey; Line and station open	Dublin and Wicklow Railway; Coastal line	Ballybrack; Line open, station closed

== Gallery ==
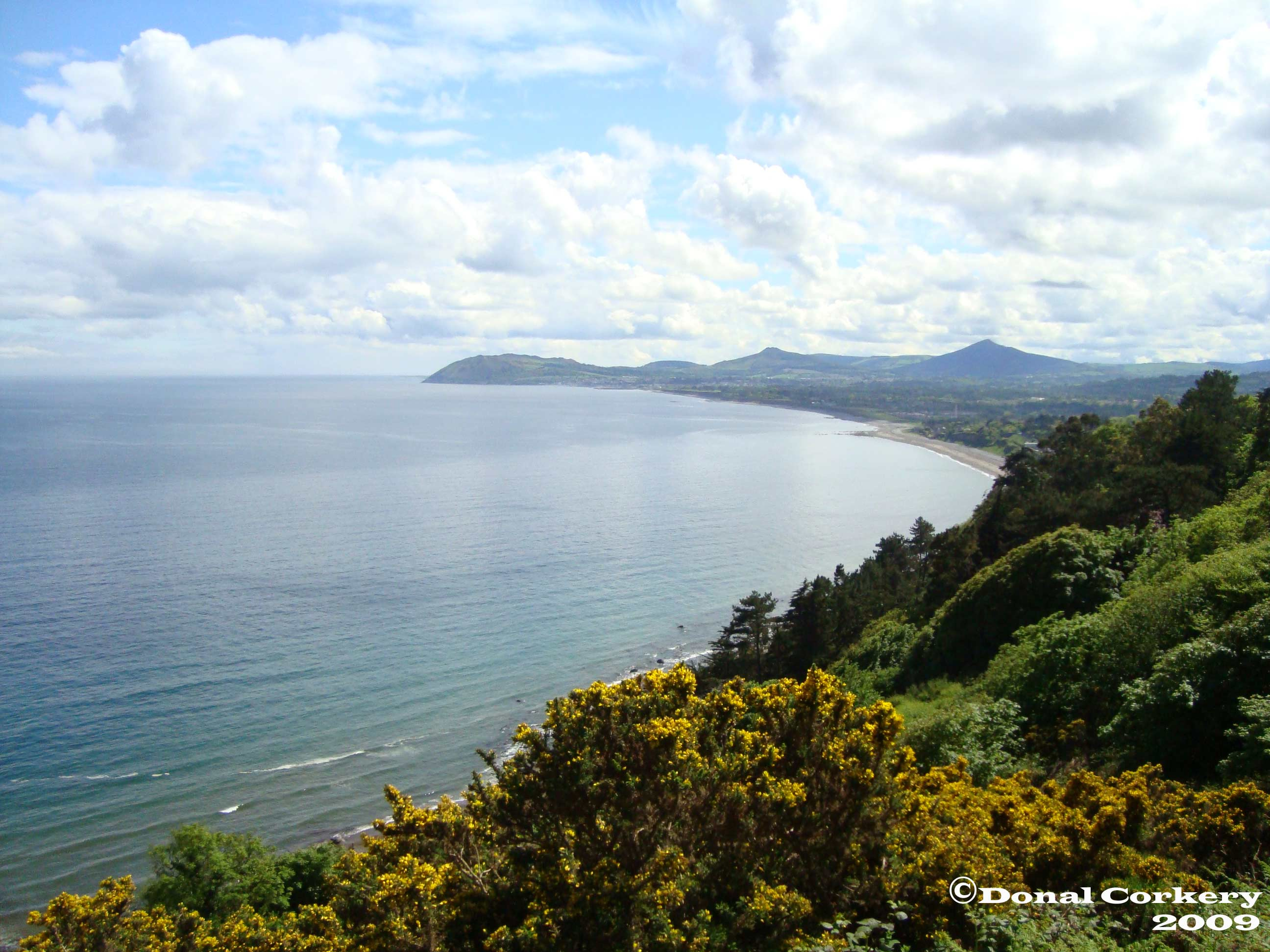
Killiney Hill 22 May 2009

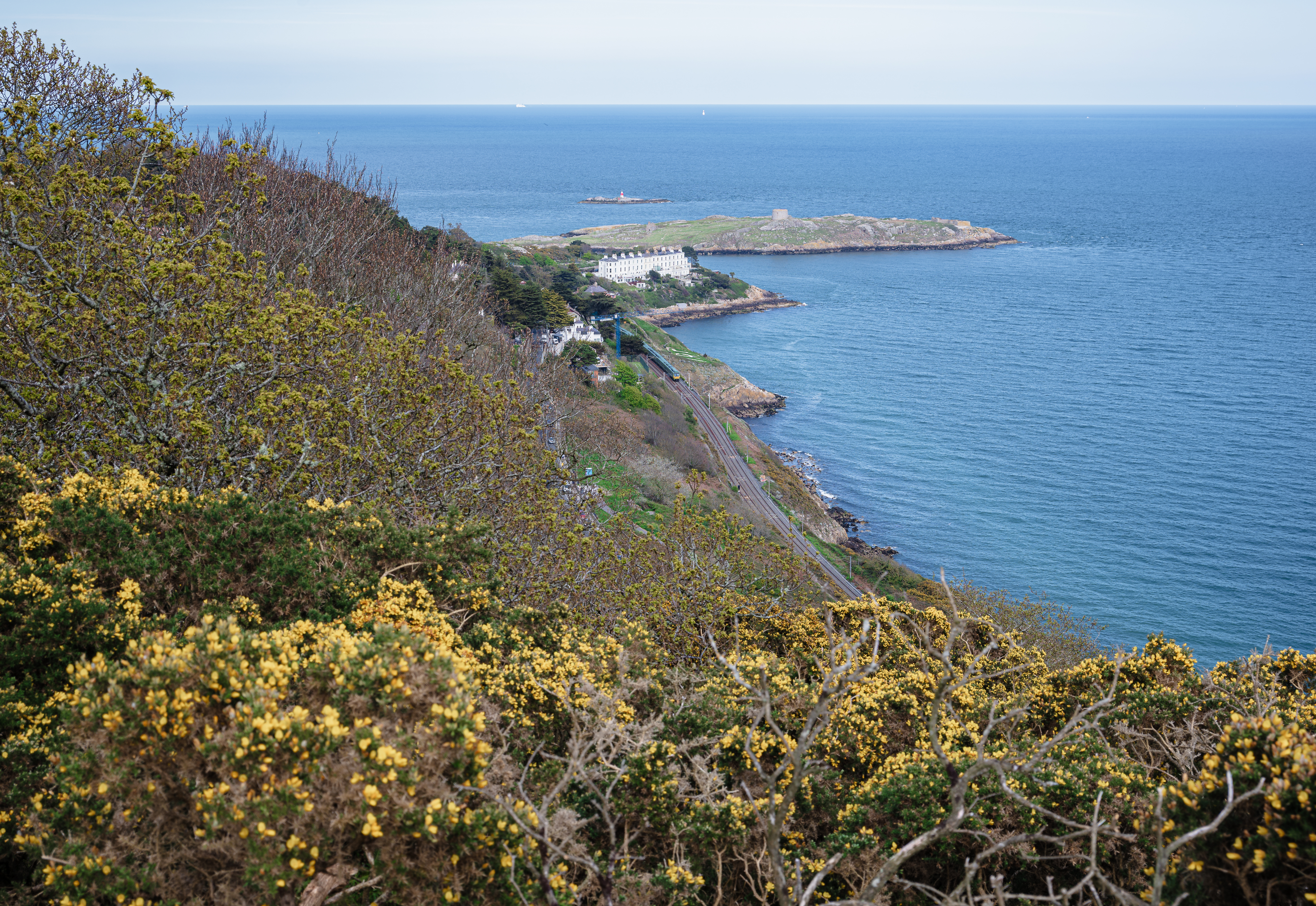
Dalkey Island and Killiney Bay 25 April 2022

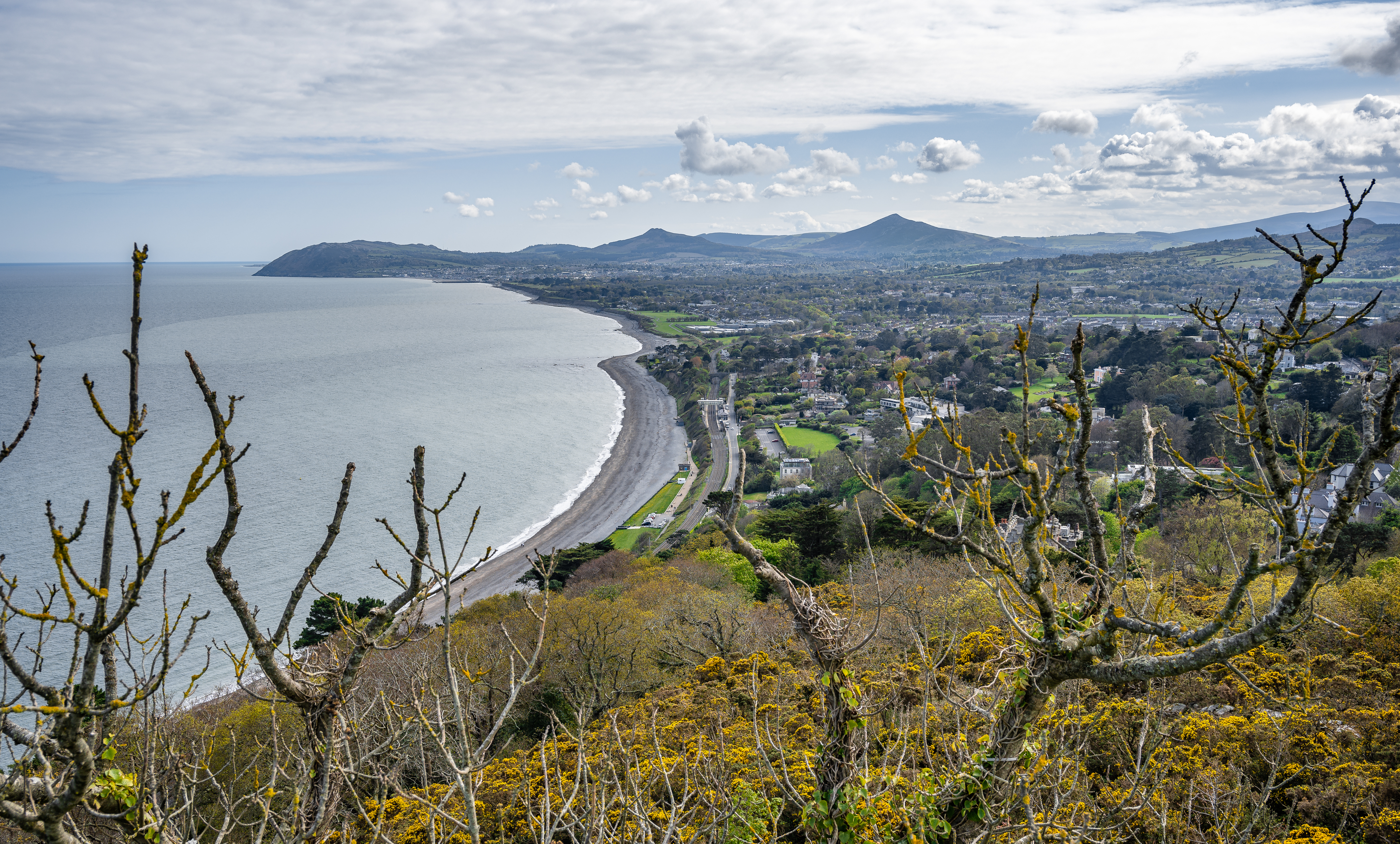
Bray and Environs from Killiney Hill 25 April 2022

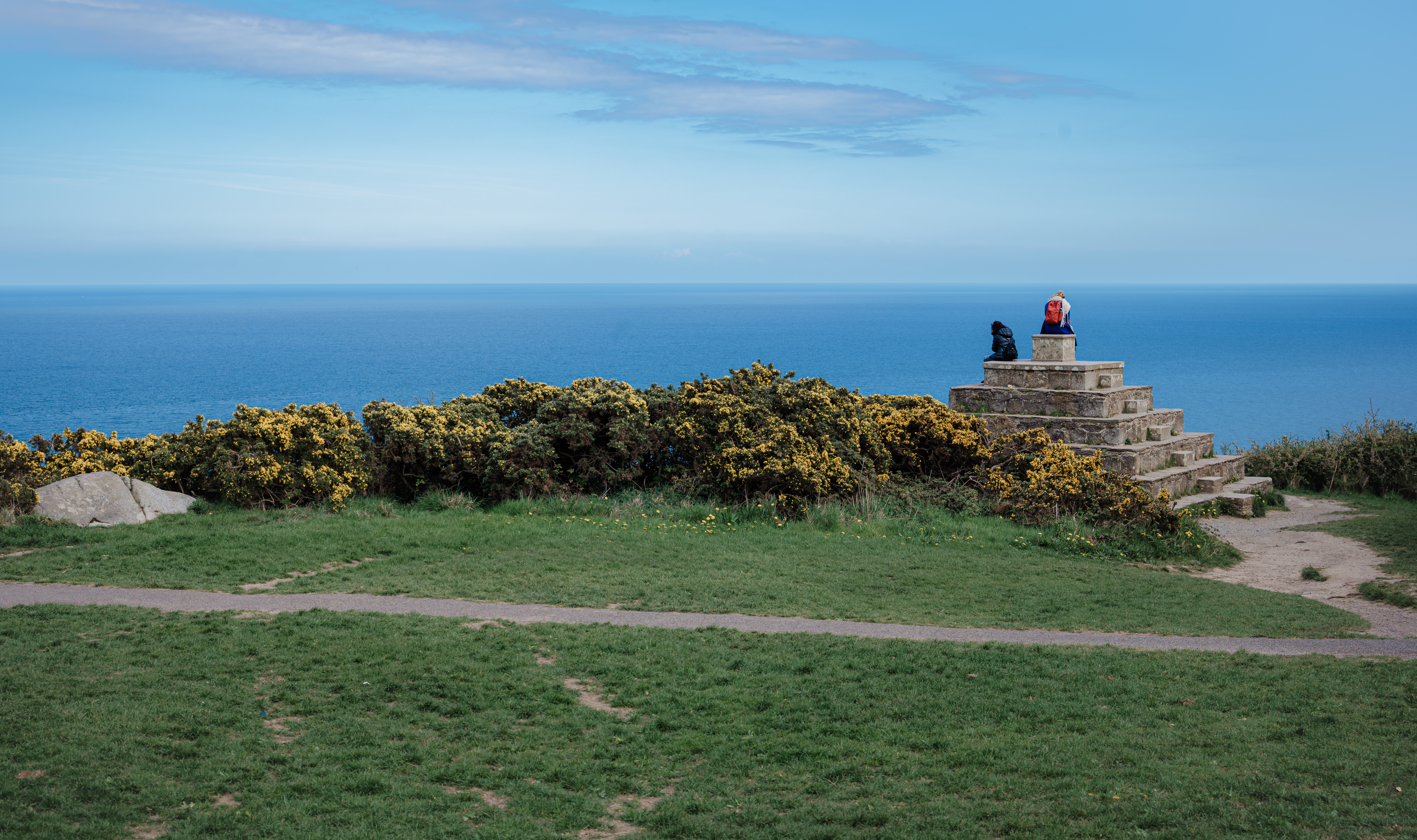
Wishing Stone 25 April 2022
