= Shankill railway station =

Railway station in Shankill, Dublin

Shankill Seanchill
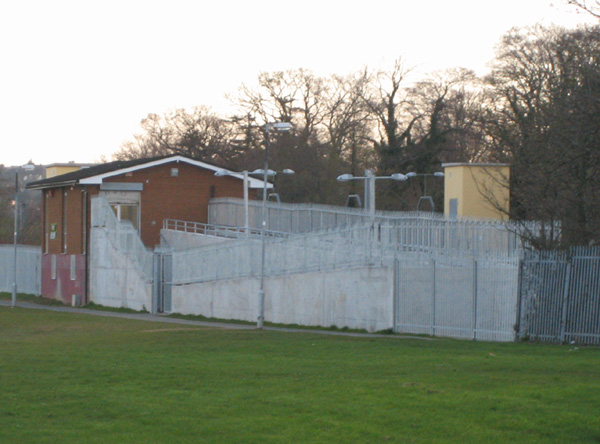
- Shankill railway station

General information
- Location: Rathsallagh Bridge, Shankill; Dublin 18, D18 XY38; Ireland
- Coordinates: 53.2363°N 6.1170°W
- Owner: Iarnród Éireann
- Operator: Iarnród Éireann
- Platforms: 2
- Tracks: 2
- Bus operators: Go-Ahead Ireland
- Connections: 45B

Construction
- Structure type: At-grade

Other information
- Station code: SKILL
- Fare zone: Suburban 3

History
- Opened: 10 June 1977

Key dates
- 1983: Station upgraded
- 2010: Station refurbished
Services
Preceding station	Iarnród Éireann	Following station
Killiney	DART	Bray Daly
Location

Shankill railway station (Irish: Stáisiún Sheanchill) serves Shankill, in Dún Laoghaire–Rathdown, Ireland.

== History and facilities ==
The current Shankill station opened on 10 June 1977. It was upgraded in 1983 to cater for the new electrified DART trains.

The station has two through platforms connected via a footbridge with lifts. As of 2024, the information office is unstaffed. Wheelchair access for trains towards Bray is on the opposite side of the station to the main entrance, access for services towards Dublin city centre is by ramp at main entrance. Two ticket vending machines are available and sell all DART and Commuter tickets as well as LEAP cards. The station provides a car park for commuters.

Since the inception of the Dublin Area Rapid Transit (DART) service in 1984, all DART services stop at Shankill.

== Services ==
As of 2023, the off-peak service pattern is as follows:

Northbound

- 3 tph to Howth.
- 3 tph to Malahide.

Southbound

- 6 tph to Bray Daly, of which 2 tph extend to Greystones.

== Bus services ==
The station is directly served by one Go-Ahead Ireland bus service, route 45B from Kilmacanogue to Dún Laoghaire. The 45B route serves Rathsallagh and Shanganagh and onwards to Dún Laoghaire and Shankill.

== See also ==
- List of railway stations in Ireland
- Rail transport in Ireland
