= Greystones railway station =

Railway station in County Wicklow, Ireland

Greystones Na Clocha Liatha
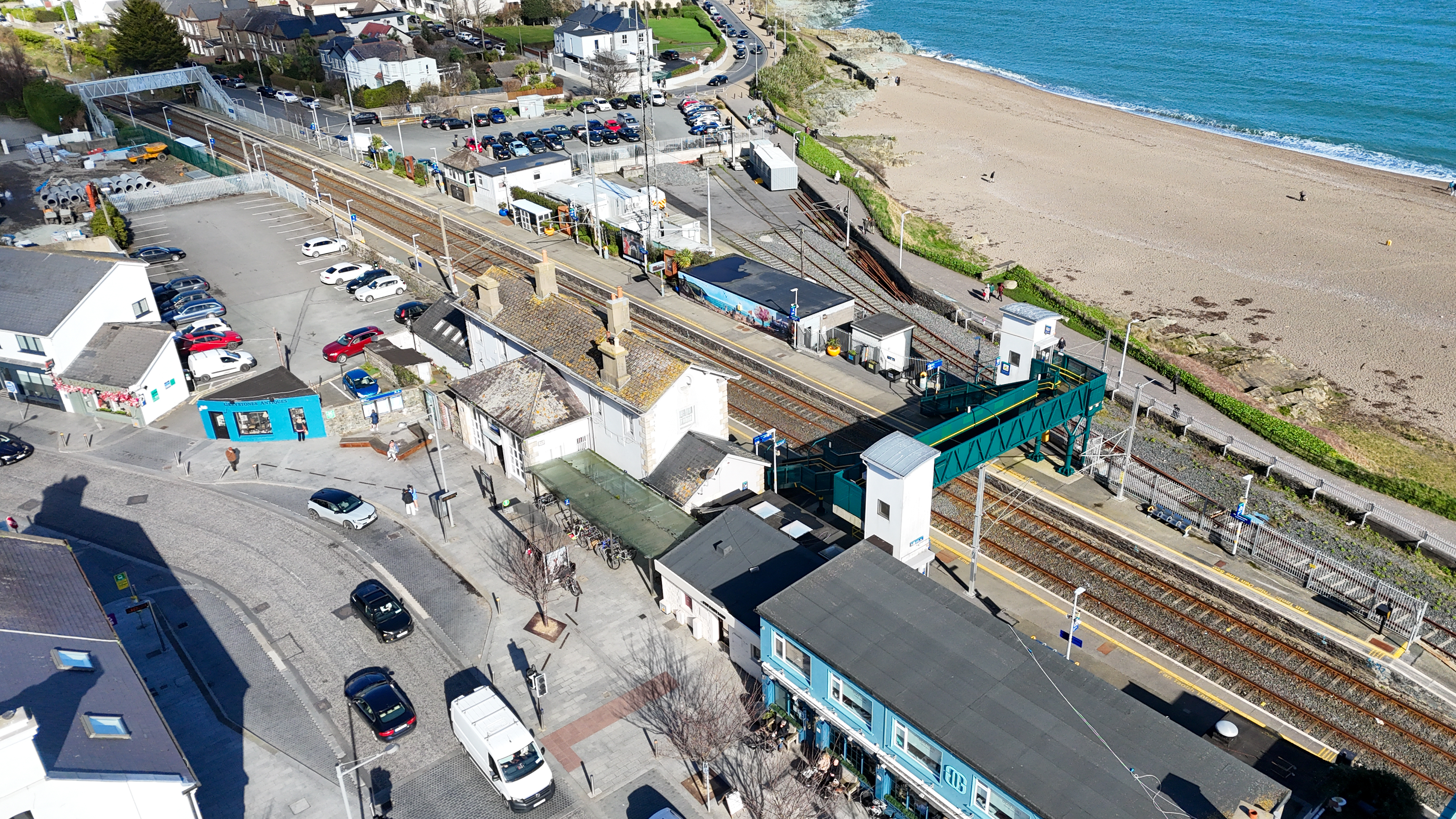
- Greystones railway station aerial photo

General information
- Other names: Greystones and Delgany
- Location: Church Road, Greystones; County Wicklow, A63 H928; Ireland
- Coordinates: 53.1435°N 6.0606°W
- Owner: Iarnród Éireann
- Operator: Iarnród Éireann
- Platforms: 2
- Tracks: 2
- Bus operators: Dublin Bus; Go-Ahead Ireland
- Connections: 84N; L1; L2; L3; X1; X2

Construction
- Structure type: At-grade
- Accessible: Yes

Other information
- Station code: GSTNS, 141
- Fare zone: Suburban 5

History
- Opened: 30 October 1855
- Original company: Dublin, Wicklow and Wexford Railway
- Pre-grouping: Dublin and South Eastern Railway
- Post-grouping: Great Southern Railways

Key dates
- 1880: Station renamed Greystones
- 30 March 1964: Goods services cease
- 10 April 2000: DART services commence
Location

Greystones railway station (Irish: Stáisiún na gCloch Liath) is a railway station in Greystones, County Wicklow, Ireland. It is the southern terminus of the DART electrified rail network.

== History ==
The station was opened on 30 October 1855 by the Dublin, Wicklow and Wexford Railway as Greystones & Delgany. It was later renamed Greystones in 1863.

Construction of the electrification and extension of the DART services to Greystones began in 1995 and was completed in 1999. The DART service to Greystones commenced on 10 April 2000.

== Facilities and services ==
The station has two platforms; platform 1 on the west side of the station (where the station building is located) and platform 2 over the footbridge on the east side of the station. Platform 2 is used only a few times a day, when DART and InterCity services are in the station at the same time. There are also sidings to the east of the station.

Entrance to the station building is only possible from Church Road. The station houses a café, a ticket office and two electronic ticket machines. Toilets are also available on platform 1. The information office is open 07:00AM to 10:00 AM, Monday to Friday.

DART services serve the station, as do all South Eastern Commuter (Dublin Connolly to Gorey) and Intercity (Dublin Connolly to Rosslare Europort) services.

The typical service from the station (Monday to Friday off-peak) is:

- 2 trains per hour to Howth or Malahide via Bray Daly and Dublin Connolly
- 4 trains per day to Rosslare Europort via Arklow
- 1 train per day to Wexford O'Hanrahan via Arklow
- 1 train per day to Gorey
- 5 trains per day to Dublin Connolly via Bray Daly (services from south of Greystones)
- 1 train per day to Dundalk.

2 trains per hour also terminate at the station.

Preceding station	Iarnród Éireann	Following station
Bray Daly	InterCity; Dublin-Rosslare Line	Kilcoole or Wicklow
Bray Daly	Commuter; South Eastern Commuter	Kilcoole or Wicklow
Bray Daly	DART	Terminus
	Historical railways	
Bray Cove Halt; Line open, station closed	Dublin and South Eastern Railway; Dublin-Wexford	Kilcoole; Line and station open

== Bus services ==
There are two bus stops directly outside the station on Church Road, one for northbound routes and the other for southbound. Operators serving the station include Dublin Bus with routes X1 and X2 at peak times, and Go-Ahead Ireland with routes L1, L2 and L3 that link the station to the surrounding towns. There is also a taxi rank near the station.

== See also ==
- List of railway stations in Ireland
