= Bray Daly railway station =

Railway station in Bray, Ireland

Bray / Daly Bré / Ó Dálaigh
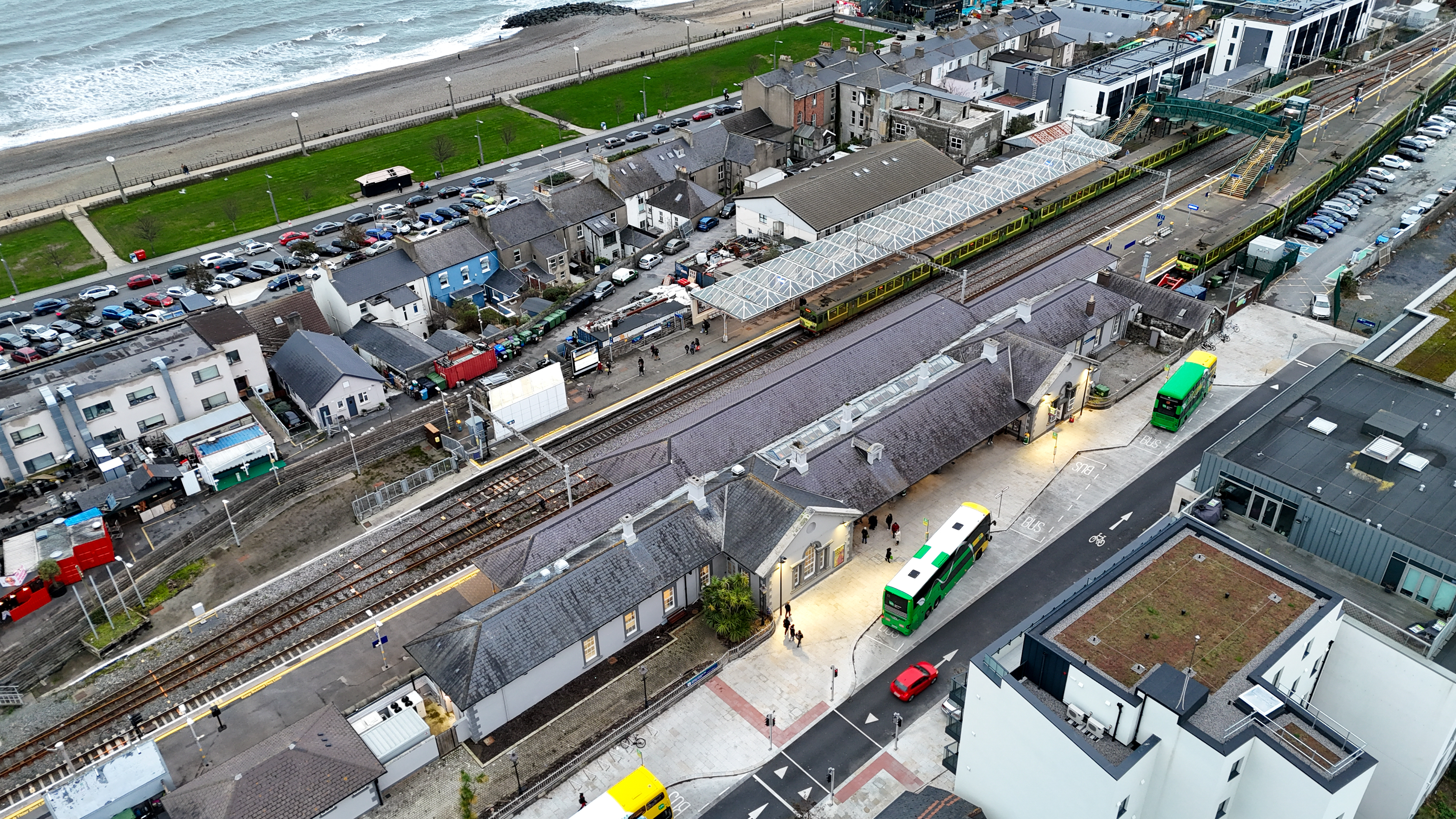
- Bray Daly Station in 2025

General information
- Location: Florence Road, Bray; County Wicklow, A98 C8X4; Ireland
- Coordinates: 53°12′15″N 6°6′1″W
- Owner: Iarnród Éireann
- Operator: Iarnród Éireann
- Platforms: 3 (only 2 see regular use)
- Tracks: 4
- Bus operators: Bus Éireann; Dublin Bus; Go-Ahead
- Connections: 45A; 45B; 131; L1; L2; L12; L14; L15

Construction
- Structure type: At-grade
- Parking: Yes
- Cycle facilities: Yes
- Accessible: Yes

Other information
- Station code: BRAY
- Fare zone: Suburban 3

History
- Opened: 10 July 1854 (as "Bray")
- Electrified: 1984
- Original company: Dublin, Wicklow and Wexford Railway
- Pre-grouping: Dublin and South Eastern Railway
- Post-grouping: Great Southern Railways

Key dates
- 1862: Added walk link to Carlisle Grounds
- 14 July 1924: Station renamed "Bri Chualann (Bray)"
- c.1930: Station renamed "Bray"
- 31 December 1958: Services to Harcourt Street cease
- 10 April 1966: Station renamed "Bray Daly"
- 2 December 1974: Station closes to goods traffic
- 1983: Station upgraded
Location

Bray / Daly Railway Station (Stáisiún Bhré / Uí Dhálaigh in Irish) is a station in Bray in County Wicklow, Ireland. It is located adjacent to Bray seafront and is 600 m from Bray Main Street via Florence Road or Quinsborough Road.

Bray marks the end of the double track line from Dublin and is the end point for most suburban services, with train stabling facilities convenient to the station.

== Routes ==
=== DART ===
From the inception of the Dublin Area Rapid Transit (DART) service in 1984 until its extension south to Greystones in 2000, Bray was the southern terminus, with a large number of sidings just south of the station for stabling trains. Although some DARTs now continue southwards to Greystones, the majority still terminate in Bray. Northbound DART services towards Howth and Malahide usually start from Bray, with some originating from Greystones. From Bray southbound the line becomes single track.

=== Other services ===
Bray is on the intercity Dublin-Rosslare and commuter Dundalk-Dublin-Arklow-Gorey routes, and all trains on these routes stop here. There are also commuter services that go to Maynooth from Bray stopping at Dún Laoghaire, Blackrock, Sydney Parade and all stations to Maynooth. They often run non-stop between Bray, Dun Laoghaire and Dublin Pearse, and freight and maintenance trains pass through Bray without stopping.

== Station building and history ==
The station was opened on 10 July 1854, following the extension of the railway line south from Dalkey. The extension of the line around Bray Head to Greystones in 1855 was not accompanied by any additional works at Bray station, so from then until 1928 the station had one through platform serving both southbound through trains and northbound trains to both Harcourt Street, Westland Row (Pearse) and Amiens Street (Connolly). As suburban services from Dublin became more frequent, this made the station extremely difficult to work, even with the provision of a bay platform at the south end for shuttle services to Greystones.

Services to Harcourt Street ceased in 1959 with the closure of the Harcourt Street line.

It was given the name Daly on 10 April 1966, 50 years after the Easter Rising, when Córas Iompair Éireann renamed 15 major stations after Republican leaders. It is named in honour of Edward Daly, a leader in the 1916 Easter Rising.

Between the 1984 inauguration of DART and November 1990, a diesel shuttle train (initially a 201 class or 121 class locomotive with former AEC railcars converted to push–pull stock, later an 80 class train leased from Northern Ireland Railways) operated between Bray and Greystones, connecting with DART services. A similar service using a steam railmotor had operated briefly between 1906 and 1908.

The station houses a bar (closed), shop, coffee stall, ticket office, automated teller machine (ATM) and unheated public toilets. There is a staff room for drivers. Sheltered bicycle parking is located inside the station. Disabled access to platform 2 on the east side of the station is through a new gate on that side, but lifts are also provided on the footbridge. The redevelopment that saw the installation of these lifts were part of Iarnród Éireann's Dart Upgrade project in the early 2000s to improve stations and facilities on the DART line. In addition to the lifts, the distinctive pyramid-style glass roof over platform 2 was renovated, as was the main station building.

The ticket office is open between 07:00–10:00, Monday to Friday.

=== Platforms ===
Since it was rebuilt in 1928, the station has two main platforms; platform 1 on the west side of the station near the main entrance, and platform 2 over the footbridge on the east side of the station. Although platform 1 is generally used for northbound services and platform 2 for southbound services and terminating trains, the roles are frequently reversed so as to accommodate as many services as possible. Platform 3, the platform formerly used for the Greystones diesel shuttle, is very seldom used as it has no northbound capacity – it ends directly south of the station building. It is used for cleaning trains and occasionally for DART services to and from Greystones.

=== Picture series ===
One of the more distinctive elements of Bray Daly Station is the series of paintings on platform 2. Beginning with a painting of the opening ceremony in 1852, the series runs along the length of the platform, documenting both Irish history and Irish railway history up to the present day. Various carriages, locomotives, and characters can be seen in the pictures, including Oscar Wilde, British soldiers in 1916, James Joyce in the 1940s, a hippy couple in the 1960s, and the introduction of the DART service in 1984. Many of these panels were in need of repair as lime was seeping through the plaster. In 2008 the original artist began a mosaic replacement programme for the mural.

== Road transport services ==
Directly outside the station are bus stops for Dublin Bus and Go-Ahead Ireland.

Go-Ahead Ireland routes:

- 45a / 45b – Kilmacanogue to Dun Laoghaire, via Bray Station
- 184 – Newtownmountkennedy to Bray Station, via Greystones
- 185 – Enniskerry to Bray Station

Bus Éireann routes:

- 131 – Bray Station to Wicklow Town, via Newtownmountkennedy and Ashford
- Bus Éireann also offer route 133 from Kilmacanogue, running from Dublin to Wicklow, which combined with 131 offer an every 30min frequency to Wicklow.

In addition, a number of bus services stop at Bray Main Street, located 600m from the station.

Dublin Bus

- Route E1 from Ballywaltrim to Northwood
- Dublin Bus Nitelink route 84N from Dublin city centre to Greystones, via Bray (Fri & Sat only)
- Aircoach route 702 from Greystones to Dublin Airport, via Bray (Castle Street)
- St. Kevin's Bus from Dublin to Glendalough, via Bray (Old Town Hall)

There is also busy taxi rank outside the station, a large car park adjacent to the station, and a pickup lane for collecting passengers by car.

== Gallery ==
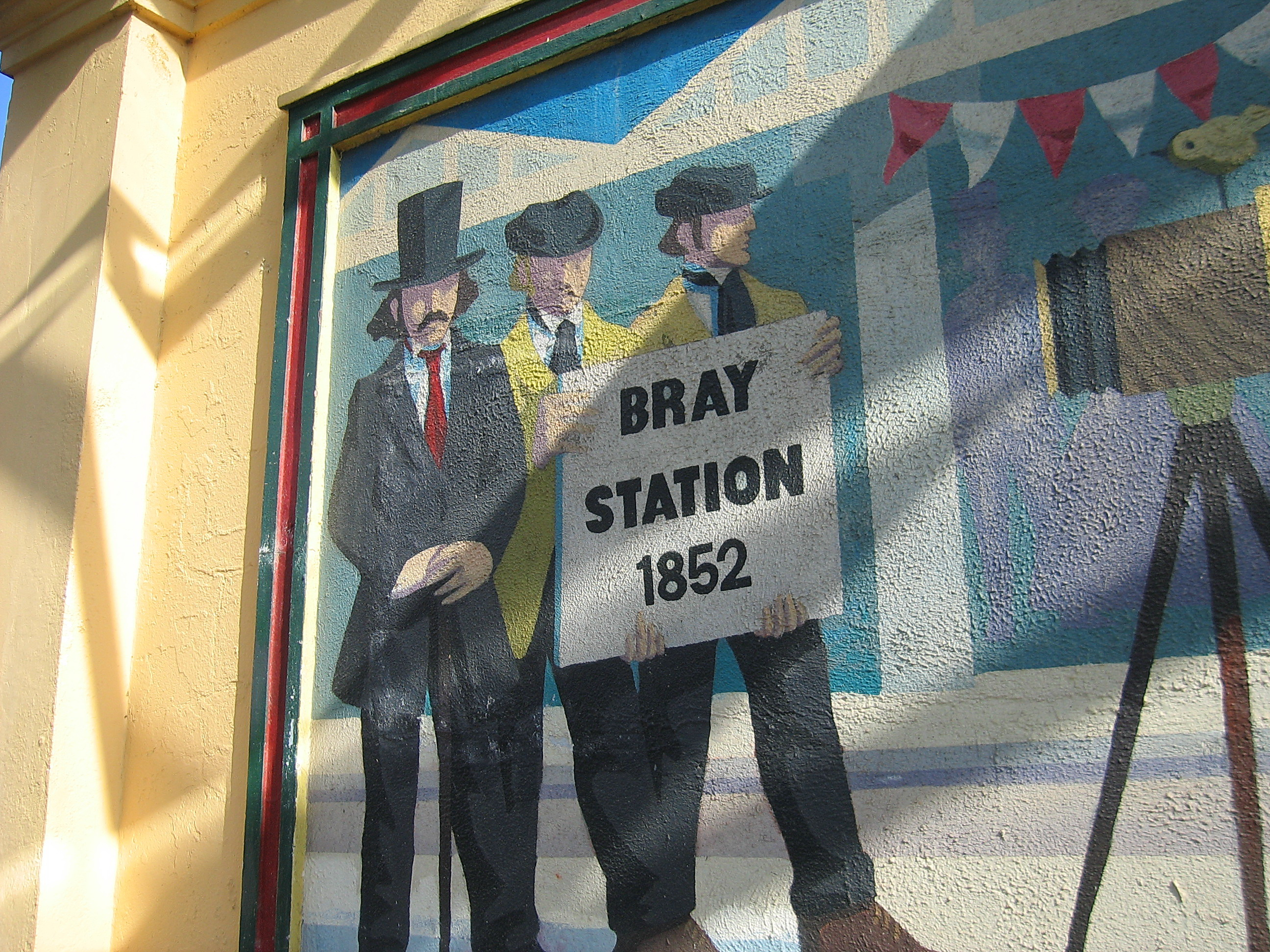
Mural in Bray Daly Station

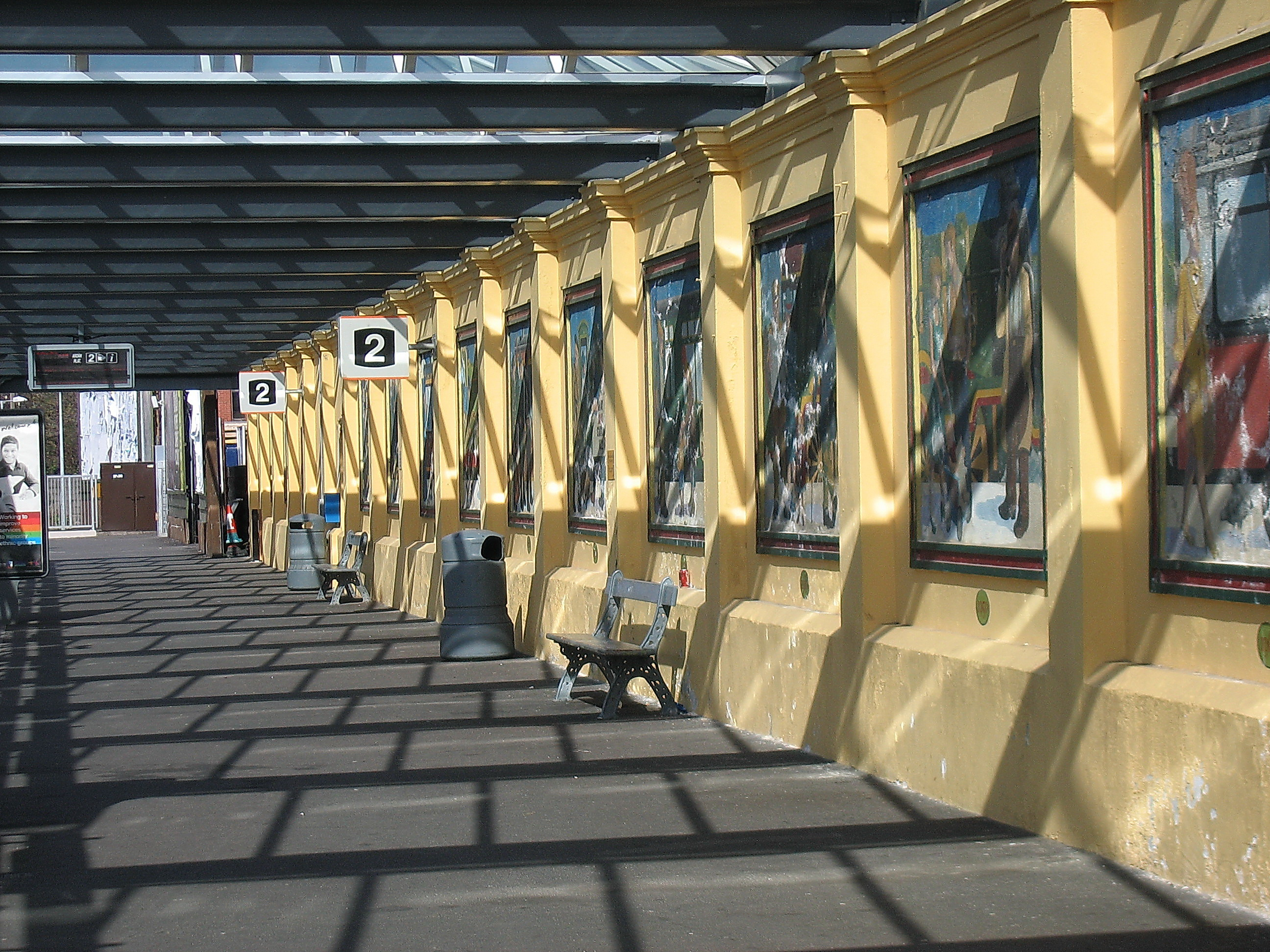
A panel representing every decade

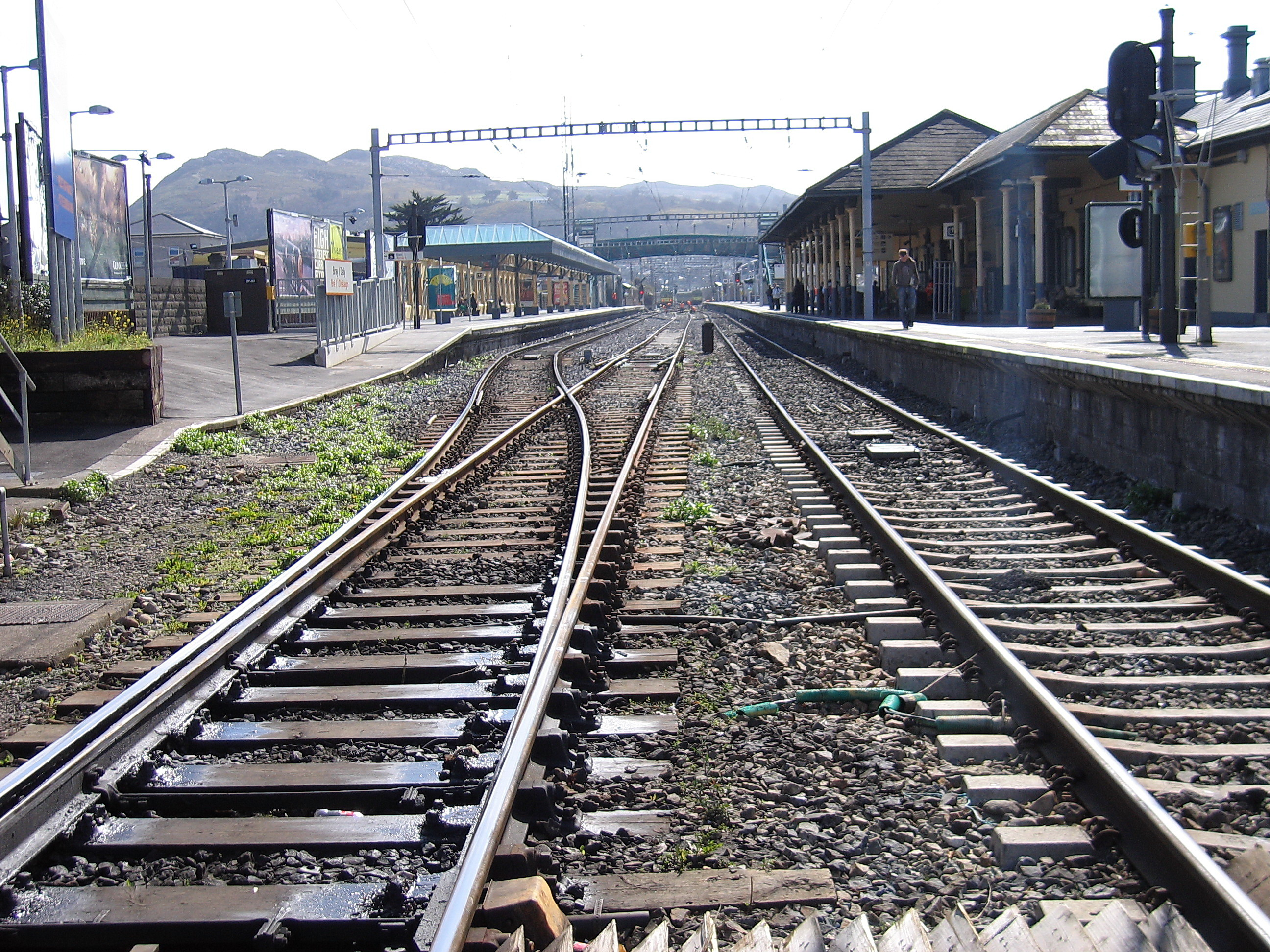
Distinctive outline of Bray Head in the background

== See also ==
- List of railway stations in Ireland

Preceding station	Iarnród Éireann	Following station
Dún Laoghaire Mallin	InterCity; Dublin–Rosslare railway line	Greystones
Dún Laoghaire Mallin	Commuter; South Eastern Commuter	Greystones
Dún Laoghaire Mallin	Commuter; Northern Commuter; Peak times only	Terminus
Dún Laoghaire Mallin	Commuter; Western Commuter (City Branch); Peak times only	Terminus
Woodbrook	DART; Trans-Dublin	Greystones or Terminus
Preceding station	Luas	Following station
Ravenswell towards Parnell or Charlestown	Green Line; Line B2	Terminus
	Disused railways	
Woodbrook Halt; Line open, station closed	Dublin and South Eastern Railway; Coastal line	Terminus or Greystones and Delgany; Line and station open From 1906 Bray Cove Halt; Line open, station closed
Woodbrook Halt; Line and station closed	Dublin and South Eastern Railway; Harcourt Street line	Terminus or Greystones and Delgany; Line and station open From 1906 Bray Cove Halt; Line open, station closed
