= Dublin and South Eastern Railway =

Irish railway company 1845 to 1924

- Lines owned and worked by DSER; Separate undertakings of DSER (Note: City of Dublin Junction Railways, and New Ross and Waterford Extension Railways); Dublin and Kingstown Railway (worked by DSER); Other (Note: Ballywilliam–Palace East leased to Great Southern and Western Railway. A short section of line in Waterford jointly owned with the same company.)
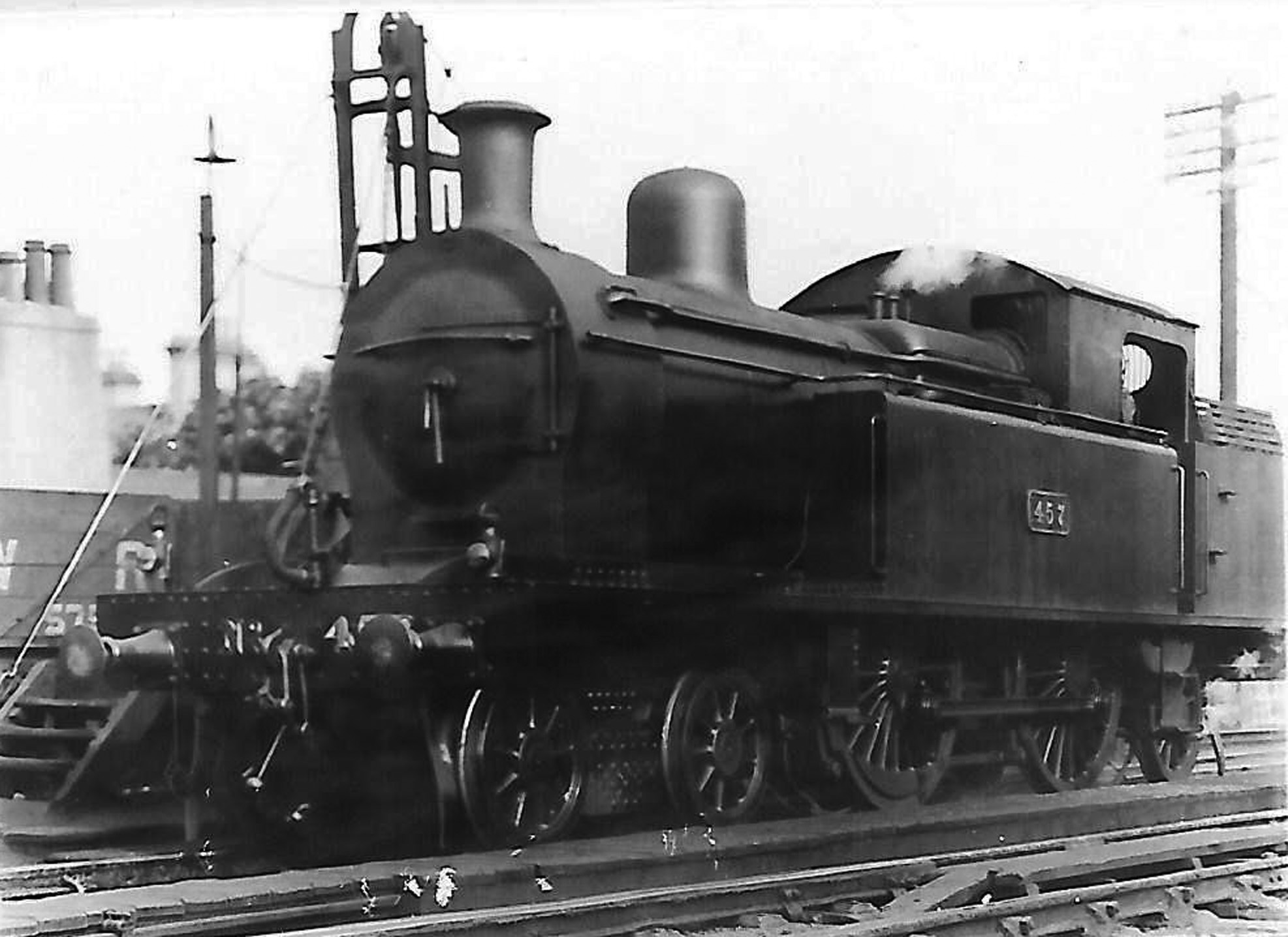
- 35 Class 457 (ex-DSER No. 35) at Bray

Overview
- Headquarters: Westland Row station
- Dates of operation: 10 July 1854–31 December 1924
- Predecessor: Dublin and Kingstown Railway; Dalkey Atmospheric Railway
- Successor: Great Southern Railways

Technical
- Track gauge: 1,600 mm (5 ft 3 in)
- Length: 156 miles 1 chain (251.1 km) (1919)
- Track length: 218 miles 8 chains (351.0 km) (1919)

The Dublin and South Eastern Railway (DSER), often referred to as the Slow and Easy, was an Irish gauge (1,600 mm (5 ft 3 in)) railway in Ireland from 1846 to 1925. It carried 4,626,226 passengers in 1911. It was the fourth largest railway operation in Ireland operating a main line from Dublin to Wexford, with branch lines to Shillelagh and Waterford. The company previously traded under the names Waterford, Wexford, Wicklow and Dublin Railway (WWW&DR or 3WS) to 1848, Dublin and Wicklow Railway (D&WR) to 1860 and Dublin, Wicklow and Wexford Railway (DW&WR) until 1906.

The DSER joined with the Great Southern Railway on 1 January 1925, the resultant company being known as Great Southern Railways.

== History ==
It was incorporated by act of Parliament, the Waterford, Wexford, Wicklow and Dublin Railway Act 1846 (9 & 10 Vict. c. ccviii) as the "Waterford, Wexford, Wicklow and Dublin Railway Company". In 1860 it was renamed the "Dublin, Wicklow and Wexford Railway Company" and on 31 December 1906 it was renamed again as the Dublin and South Eastern Railway (DSER) by the Dublin, Wicklow and Wexford Railway Act 1906 (6 Edw. 7. c. lxxxi). Amongst the lines forming the DSER was the Dublin and Kingstown Railway, which was authorised by the Dublin and Kingstown Railway Act 1831 (1 & 2 Will. 4. c. lxix) and opened in 1834 – the first public railway in Ireland. The Kingstown – Dalkey section was operated by atmospheric traction for a short while. The railway formed part of the Royal Mail route between London and Dublin via Dún Laoghaire railway station at Kingstown (now Dún Laoghaire).

The DSER was much affected by the Irish Civil War including 31 major incidents. When added to shortages and inflationary costs arising from and after the First World War the DSER found itself, in common with other railway companies in Ireland, in difficult financial and operational conditions.

A railway bill of 1924 attempted to amalgamate the Great Southern and Western Railway (GS&WR), Midland Great Western Railway (MGWR) and DSER into the Great Southern Railway whose networks were entirely within the Irish Free State. The DSER, being part British owned, stayed out of the merger which occurred on 12 November 1924, with a preference to merge with the Great Northern Railway of Ireland (GNRI) which covered lines north from Dublin and throughout the North of Ireland. The DSER finally merged with the Great Southern Railway to form the Great Southern Railways (GSR) on 1 January 1925.

=== Predecessors and extensions ===
==== Dublin and Kingstown Railway ====
The Dublin and Kingstown Railway (D&KR) was Ireland's first railway. It linked Westland Row in Dublin with Kingstown Harbour in County Dublin. It was authorised by the Dublin and Kingstown Railway Act 1831 (1 & 2 Will. 4. c. lxix), and the first part of the line running from Dublin to Kingstown Pier was opened on 17 December 1834, with an extension to Kingstown (Dún Laoghaire station's current location) opened on 13 May 1837.

==== Dalkey Atmospheric Railway ====
The Dalkey Atmospheric Railway was an extension of the Dublin and Kingstown Railway to Atmospheric Road in Dalkey in County Dublin. It was unofficially opened as far as Sandycove on 19 August 1843. The route from Sandycove to Dalkey (atmospheric station) was opened on 19 March 1844, in time for the official opening of the on 29 March 1844. It used part of the Dalkey Quarry industrial tramway, which was earlier used for the construction of Kingstown (Dún Laoghaire) Harbour. It was the first railway of its type in the world.

==== Dublin and Wicklow Railway Company ====
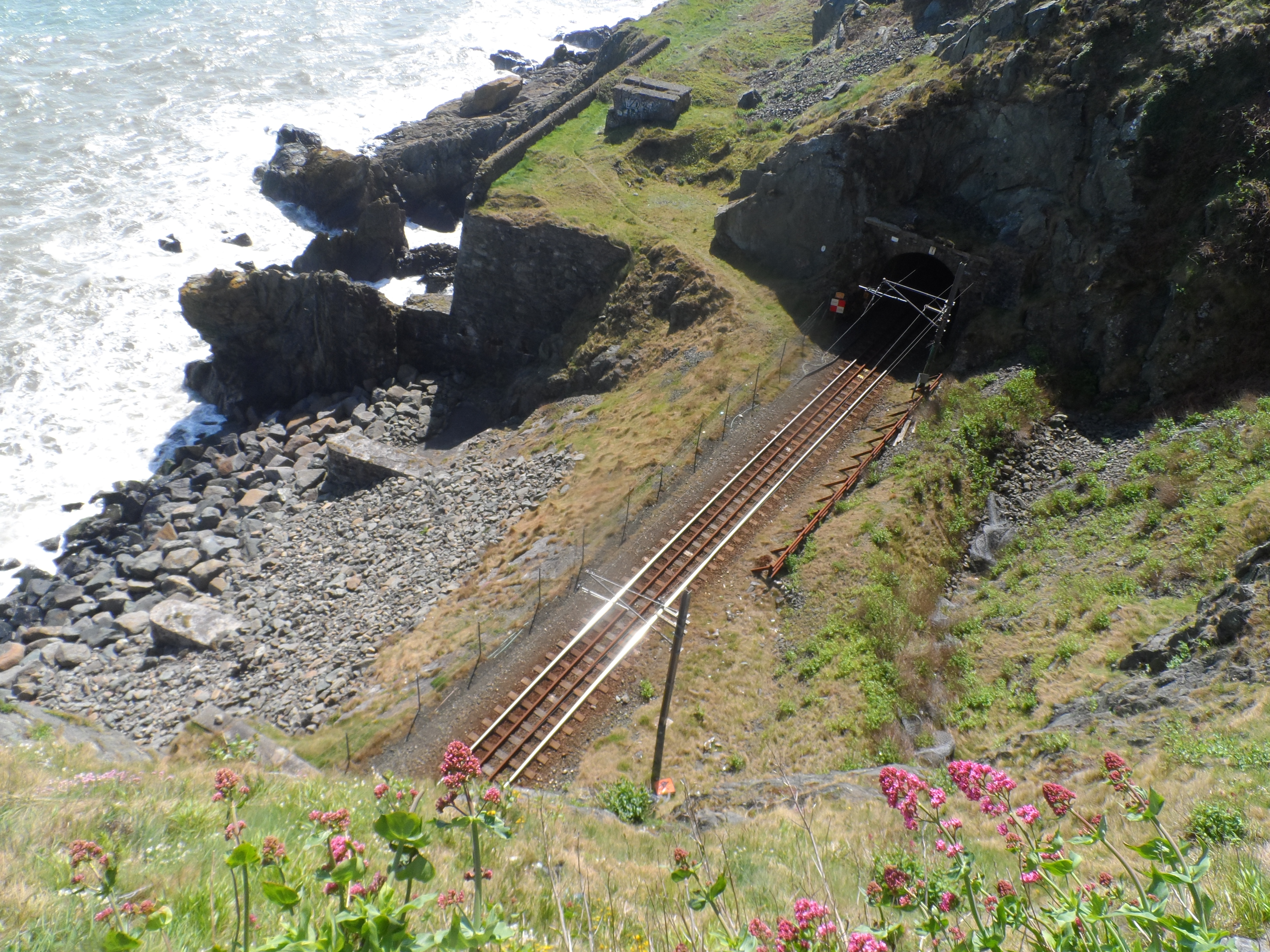
Coastal railway line between Bray and Greystones.

The entity that became the DSER was incorporated by the Waterford, Wexford, Wicklow and Dublin Railway Act 1846 (9 & 10 Vict. c. ccviii) as the "Waterford, Wexford, Wicklow and Dublin Railway Company", with the name changing to Dublin and Wicklow Railway at the same time. They leased the Dublin and Kingstown Railway in 1854, converted it from 4 ft 8 1/2 in (1,435 mm) gauge to their 5 ft 3 in (1,600 mm) gauge. The remainder of the line to Wexford was opened over the next 20 years in stages.

The first section of D&W line from Dundrum and Dalkey to Bray was opened on 10 July 1854. A continuous route from Dublin to Wicklow was established the following year, when the section from the Dublin and Kingston terminus at Dalkey (atmospheric station) to D&W's Dalkey station was opened on 10 October 1855, and the extension from Bray to Wicklow (Murrough) opened 3 weeks later on 30 October. The line to Harcourt Road (later Harcourt Street) became the main line while the line to Westland Row became the branch until it was double tracked in 1882 and became a second main line. Coastal erosion has been a problem on the route to Wicklow, forcing the opening of a deviation between Ballybrack and Bray on 1 October 1915, and numerous deviations between Bray and Wicklow.

It was renamed the "Dublin, Wicklow and Wexford Railway Company" by the Dublin, Wicklow and Wexford Railway (Enniscorthy Extension) Act 1860 (23 & 24 Vict. c. xlvii) in keeping with the southwards expansion of the railway.

==== Dublin, Wicklow and Wexford Railway Company ====
The line was extended onward to Enniscorthy in the early 1860s, starting with the line from Wicklow Junction to Rathdrum (Kilcommon), which opened on 20 August 1861. At this time the line from Wicklow Junction to the Murrough station was bypassed. It remained in use as a freight station and saw occasional passenger services. This was followed by further extensions to Ovoca (Avoca) on 18 July 1863 and Enniscorthy on 16 November 1863 and branch line to Shillelagh in 1865.

In the early 1870s the route was finally completed to Wexford. The route from Enniscorthy to the original Wexford Station (Carcur) was opened on 17 August 1872. It was extended to Wexford North, the current station, in August 1874.

==== Branch to Waterford ====
A branch was opened to New Ross in 1887. This left the main line at Macmine near Wexford. It was extended from New Ross to Waterford in 1904. This extension connected with the Great Southern and Western Railway, which in turn connected with trains for the south of Ireland. It was a 'separate undertaking' of DSER named New Ross and Waterford Extension Railways.

==== City of Dublin Junction Railways ====
The City of Dublin Junction Railway was authorised by the Dublin, Wicklow and Wexford Railway (City of Dublin Junction Railways) Act 1884 (47 & 48 Vict. c. clxxxii), and opened on 1 May 1891. This connected the DW&W at Westland Row station with Amiens Street station in the north of the city.

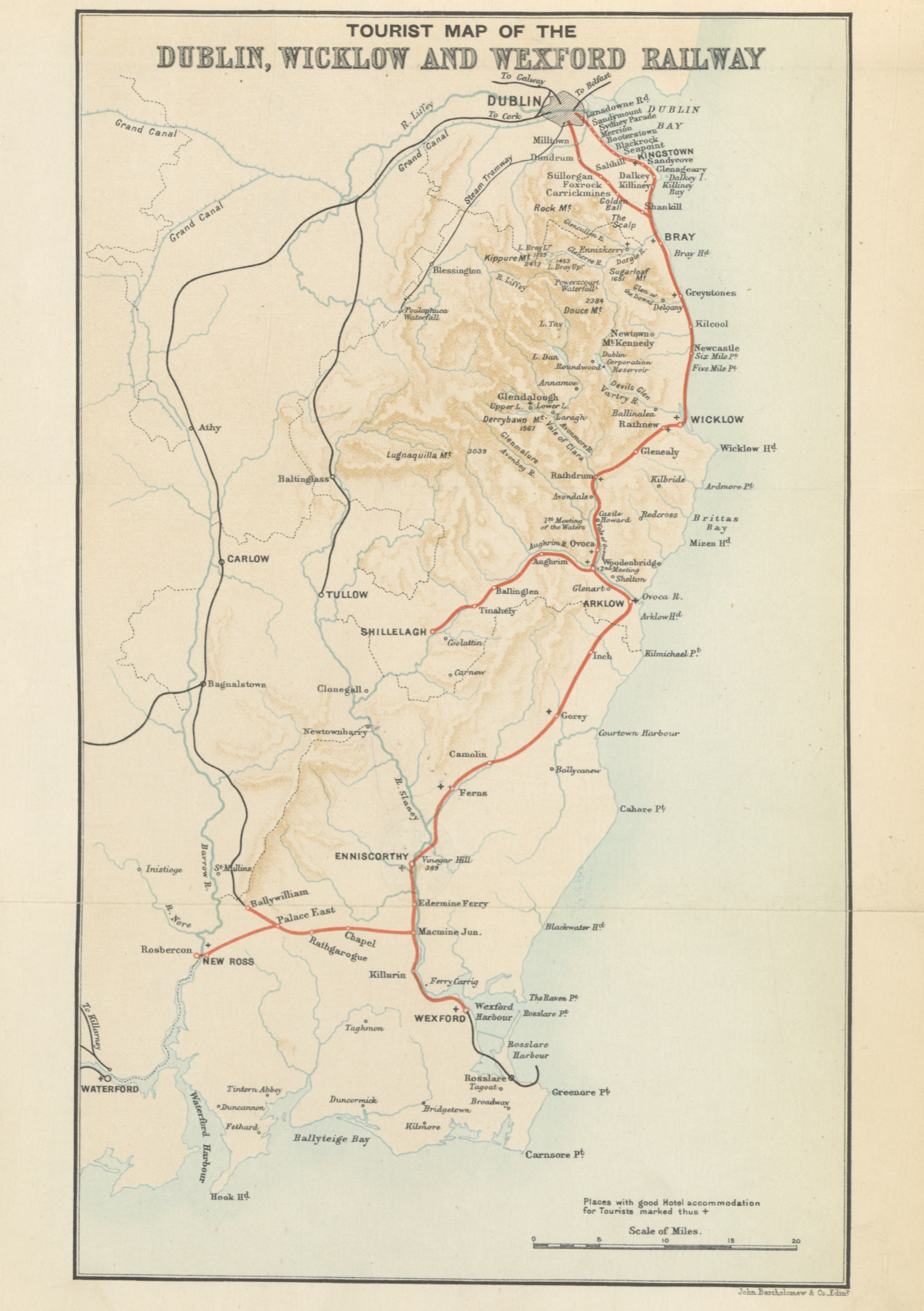
Dublin, Wicklow and Wexford Railway network in 1895

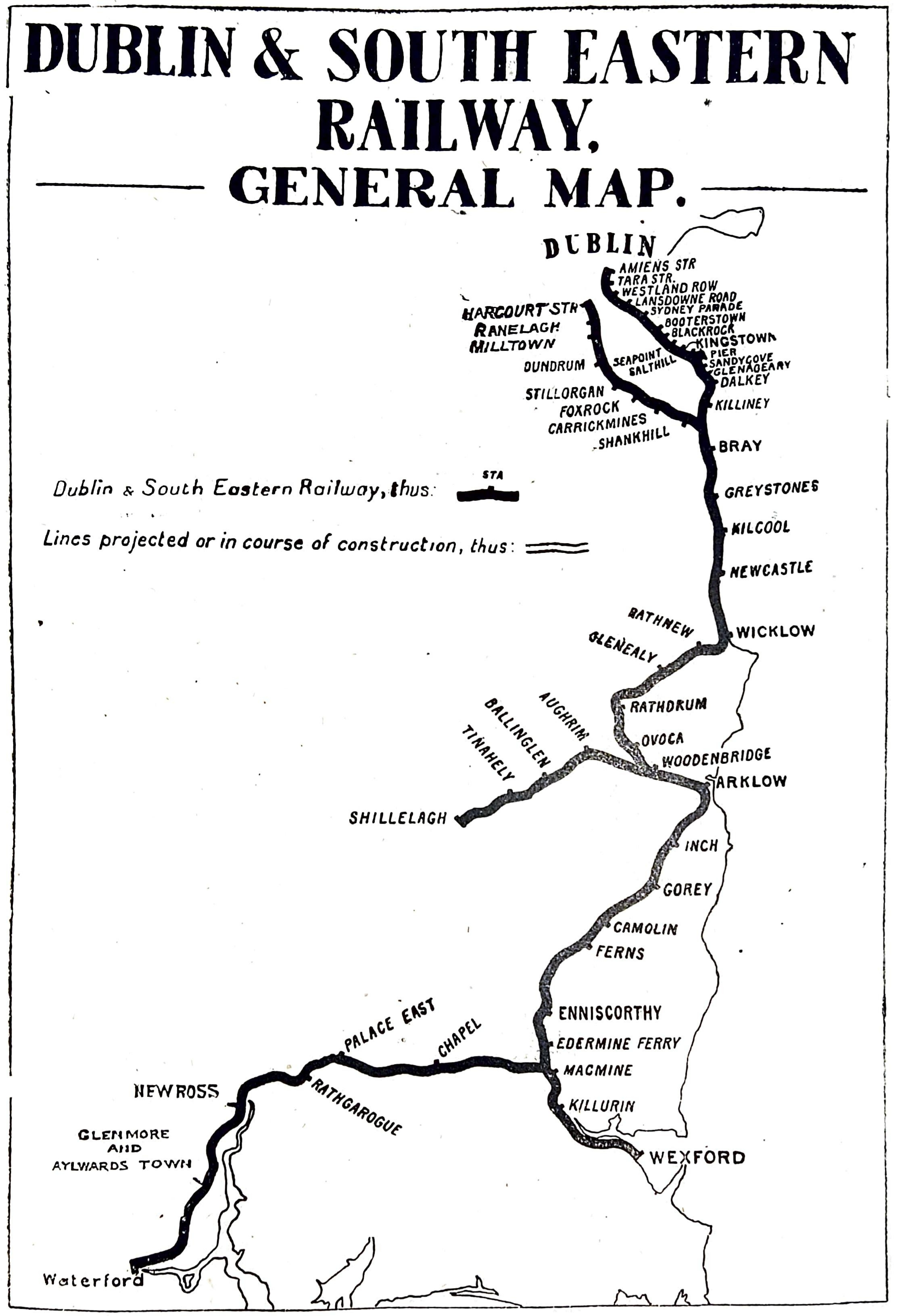
Dublin and South Eastern Railway network in 1920

== Network and infrastructure ==
The DSER had two main stations in Dublin on separate lines; Westland Row (renamed Pearse Station in 1966) for the coastal line and a terminus at Harcourt Street for the Harcourt Street line. It also owned the Marine Station Hotel at Bray and the Grand Central Hotel at Rathdrum, south of Wicklow.

=== Grand Canal Street railway works ===
The locomotive workshop for the DSER was the Grand Canal Street railway works, also known as The Factory, a two-storey converted distillery at Grand Canal Street, Dublin. With no lifting crane and poor workshop layout the works was increasingly stretched by larger locomotives and the shortages from the First World War and damages due to the Irish Civil War.

== Rolling stock ==
According to the Railway Year Book 1912, the railway operated 60 locomotives, hauling 253 passenger coaches and 1,005 goods vehicles. The locomotives were painted black picked out with red bands and gold lines, while the passenger vehicles were crimson lake with gold lines.

One DSER steam locomotive is preserved: a 2-6-0 goods locomotive No. 15 (later Great Southern Railways No. 461) owned by the Railway Preservation Society of Ireland at Whitehead, County Antrim.

== Accidents and incidents ==
Bray Head in 1867

- A derailment on 9 August 1867 at the Brandy Hole Viaduct resulted in the train and most of the coaches falling into the sea below. Two passengers were killed, and there were a further 25 injuries.

1900 train crash at Harcourt Street station into Hatch Street Upper

- On 20 February 1900, a cattle train overran buffers at Harcourt Street station, Dublin.
- On 29 February 1908, two shunters; Timothy Doyle and William Needham were killed after a carriage they were pushing collided with a steam engine travelling tender at Bray Station.

== Legislation ==
- Waterford, Wexford, Wicklow and Dublin Railway Act 1846
- Waterford, Wexford, Wicklow and Dublin Railway Amendment Act 1848
- Dublin and South Eastern Railway Act 1908
- Dublin and South Eastern Railway Act 1912
- Dublin and Wicklow Railway Act 1851
- Dublin and Bray Railway Act 1851
- Dublin and Wicklow Railway Amendment Act 1857
- Dublin and Wicklow Railway (Gorey Extension) Act 1859
- Dublin, Wicklow and Wexford Railway (Enniscorthy Extension) Act 1860
- Dublin, Wicklow and Wexford Railway (City of Dublin Junction Railways) Act 1884
- Dublin, Wicklow and Wexford Railway (New Ross and Waterford Extension) Act 1897

== See also ==
- Dublin-Rosslare railway line
- Harcourt Street railway line
- History of rail transport in Ireland
