= Athy railway station =

Railway station in County Kildare, Ireland

Athy Baile Átha Í
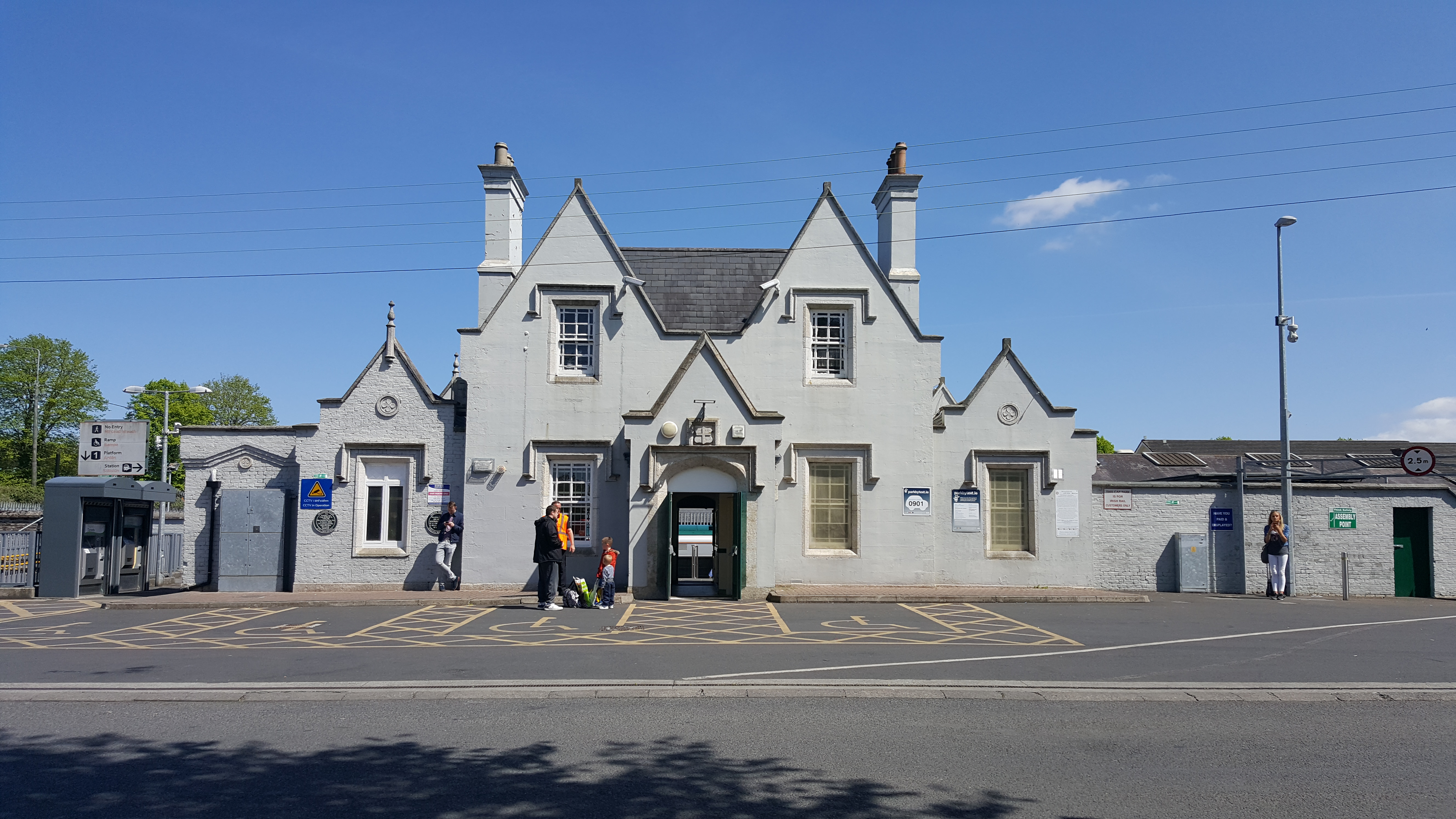
- Athy Railway Station

General information
- Location: Church Road, Athy; County Kildare, R14 XH64; Ireland
- Coordinates: 52.9925°N 6.9768°W
- Owner: Iarnród Éireann
- Operator: Iarnród Éireann
- Platforms: 2
- Bus operators: TFI Local Link
- Connections: 888; 897

Construction
- Structure type: At-grade

Other information
- Station code: ATHY
- Fare zone: F

Key dates
- 4 August 1846: Station opens
- 6 September 1976: Station closes to goods

Services
Preceding station	Iarnród Éireann	Following station
Kildare	InterCity; Dublin-Waterford	Carlow
	Historical railways	
Cherryville Junction	Great Southern and Western Railway; Dublin-Waterford	Mageney
Location
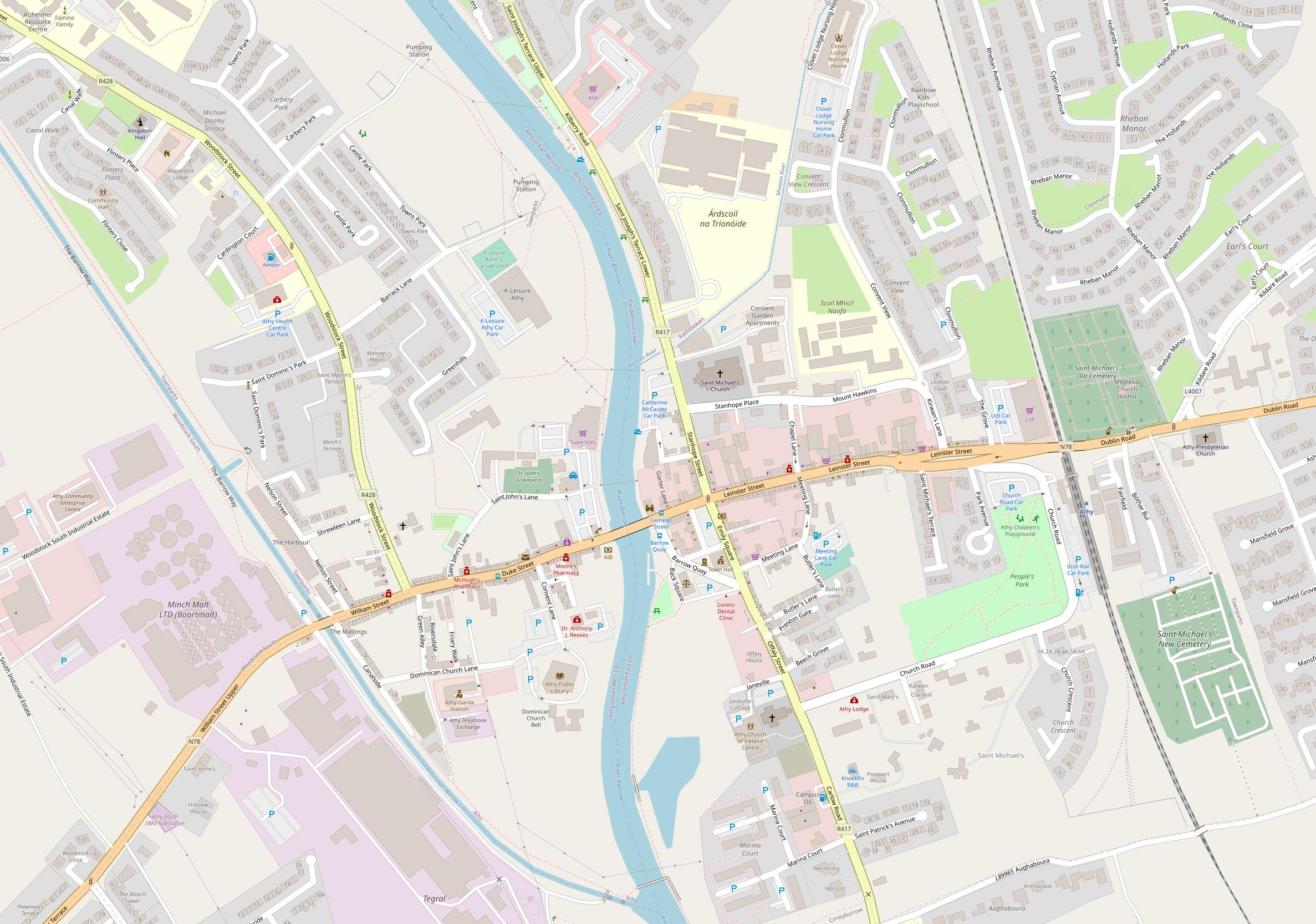
- Location within Athy Location within Ireland

Athy railway station serves the town of Athy in County Kildare, Ireland.

It is a station on the Dublin to Waterford intercity route.

== Description ==
The single track north and south of the station splits to provide two platforms. Platform 1, next to the station building, car park and pedestrian entrance, is used where possible for passenger services. only when two trains are in the station simultaneously is Platform 2 used. A siding at the southern end of the station is all that remains of the line to Wolfhill.

Due to the rapid growth of Athy itself, this station has seen considerable growth in passenger numbers. In 2004 the mechanical signalling system was replaced. In 2007 the platforms were extended to accommodate longer trains, a development which included the demolition of the signal box. In July 2008, planning permission was granted for the refurbishment of the partially derelict station building itself.

== History ==
The station opened on 4 August 1846. Opened by the Great Southern and Western Railway, the station was amalgamated into the Great Southern Railways.

The line was nationalised, passing to the Córas Iompair Éireann with the Transport Act 1944 which took effect from 1 January 1945 and closed for goods traffic on 6 September 1976.

It passed on to Iarnród Éireann in 1986.

=== Footbridge ===
Athy station was not originally built with a footbridge. On February 5, 1886, a newsboy, John Hamilton, was struck by a train while crossing the tracks, suffering serious injuries. He died two days later. At the inquest the railway company was criticised that they had “not at present proper provision for the protection of life at the railway station, and we, therefore, consider that a bridge crossing should be erected without delay”. By the end of April 1886 the new footbridge was ready to open.

=== Wolfhill Line ===
Due to limited coal supplies during World War I, a branch from Athy to the collieries at Gracefield and Modubeagh near Wolfhill, County Laois was opened by the government in September 1918. It was built by reusing track obtained by singling a section of the mainline to Waterford at a cost of approximately £125,000. The branch left the main line at the south end of Athy station, crossed the River Barrow with a concrete-built bridge, and passed through the village of Ballylinan (Ballylynan). Initially, the branch was primarily used to transport coal. The Wolfhill collieries closed in the 1920s, but a shortened line as far as a siding at Ballylinan remained open for the transport of sugar beet to the Irish Sugar Company's factory at Carlow.

The branch was vested in the Great Southern Railways in 1929.

In the early 1940s, a short spur for the delivery of cement was constructed to the Asbestos Cement Factory (later to become Tegral, and now Etex) on the west side of Athy town.

In 1963, as part of a wider program of line and station closures, the line between Ballylinan and the Asbestos Cement Factory was closed.

The Asbestos Cement Factory spur closed in 2005 and the track was lifted in 2019, in preparation for the construction of the Athy Distributor Road. As of 2023 only a short siding at the southern end of Athy station remains, although the bridge over the Barrow has been renovated and repurposed for walking and cycling.

== Services ==
All journeys are operated by Iarnród Éireann.

The current Monday to Friday service pattern is:

- 7 trains per day to Waterford
  - An extra train runs on Fridays only.
- 2 trains per day to Carlow
- 10 trains per day to Dublin Heuston
  - An extra journey runs on Fridays only.

On Saturdays, the service pattern is:

- 7 trains per day to Waterford
- 8 trains per day to Dublin Heuston

The Sunday service pattern is:

- 4 trains per day to Waterford
- 4 trains per day to Dublin Heuston

Preceding station	Iarnród Éireann	Following station
Kildare	InterCity; Dublin-Waterford	Carlow

== See also ==
- List of railway stations in Ireland
