= Muine Bheag (Bagenalstown) railway station =

Station serving Bagenalstown in County Carlow, Ireland

Bagenalstown Muine Bheag
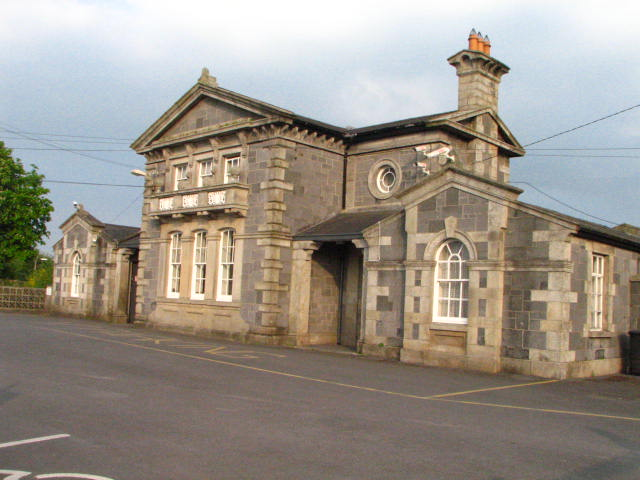
- Muine Bheag halt from the forecourt

General information
- Location: Railway Road, Muine Bheag; County Carlow, R21 H295; Ireland
- Coordinates: 52.699098°N 6.952521°W
- Owner: Iarnród Éireann
- Operator: Iarnród Éireann
- Platforms: 2

Construction
- Structure type: At-grade

Other information
- Station code: MNEBG
- Fare zone: H

Key dates
- 24 July 1848: Station opens as Bagnalstown
- By April 1910: Station renamed Bagenalstown
- 6 September 1976: Station closed to goods
- 1988: Station reopened and renamed Muine Bheag
Location

Muine Bheag halt serves the town of Bagenalstown (Irish: Muine Bheag), in County Carlow, Ireland. Nearby is Leighlinbridge in the same county.

It is a station on the Dublin to Waterford intercity route.

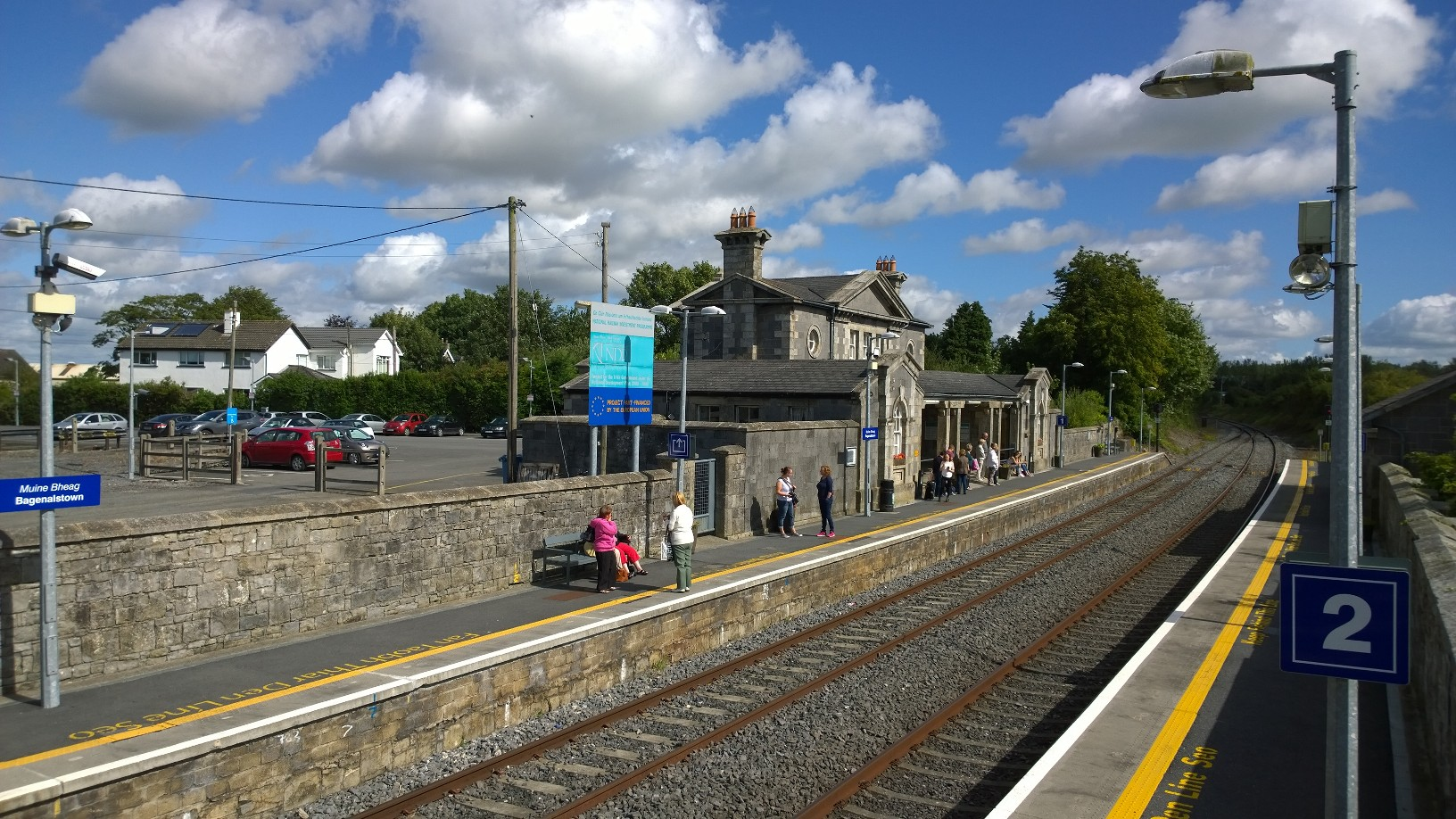
The station platforms from the footbridge

The station is staffed; the main platform is fully accessible but the far-side platform (used only when two trains pass in the station) is accessible only by stairs and a footbridge.

== History ==
The station opened on 24 July 1848 as Bagnalstown (renamed Bagenalstown by April 1910). The station was designed by Sancton Wood.

Opened by the Great Southern and Western Railway, the station was amalgamated into the Great Southern Railways. The line was then nationalised, passing to the Córas Iompair Éireann with the Transport Act 1944 which took effect from 1 January 1945.

The station was closed to passengers on 30 March 1963 and for goods traffic on 6 September 1976. Although the station closed the line remained open.

Station passed on to the Iarnród Éireann in 1986 and was re-opened, renamed Muine Bheag, in 1988. The station nameboards bore solely the Irish language name until c.2015 when they were replaced with the bilingual Muine Bheag/Bagenalstown.

== Services ==
The current Monday to Saturday service pattern is:

- 7 trains per day to Waterford
- 7 trains per day to Dublin Heuston

On Sundays, the service pattern is:

- 4 trains per day to Waterford
- 4 trains per day to Dublin Heuston

Preceding station	Iarnród Éireann	Following station
Carlow	InterCity; Dublin-Waterford	Kilkenny; MacDonagh
	Historical railways	
Milford	Great Southern and Western Railway; Dublin-Waterford	Gowran

== See also ==
- List of railway stations in Ireland
