= Clonmel railway station =

Station in County Tipperary, Ireland

Clonmel Cluain Meala
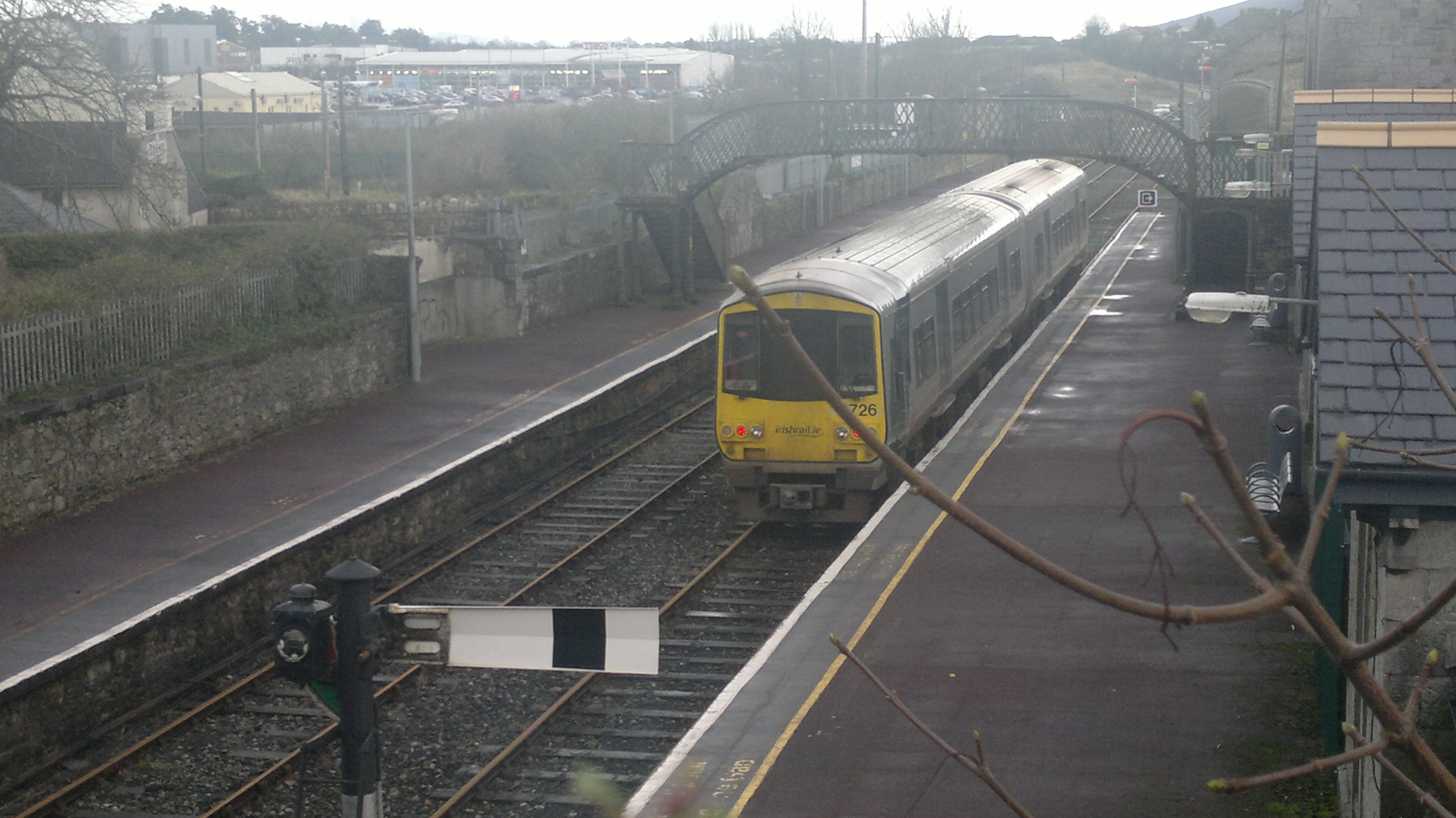
- 2726 Arrives from Limerick Junction

General information
- Location: Thomas Street, Clonmel; County Tipperary, E91 N9C4; Ireland
- Coordinates: 52°21′40″N 7°41′59″W
- Owner: Iarnród Éireann
- Operator: Iarnród Éireann
- Platforms: 2
- Bus operators: Bus Éireann; TFI Local Link
- Connections: 55; 245; 355; 356

Construction
- Structure type: At-grade

Other information
- Station code: CLMEL
- Fare zone: G

History
- Opened: 1852

Key dates
- 1880: line to Thurles opened
- 1963: Thurles passenger trains withdrawn
- 1967: line to Thurles closed
- 1988: reduced to halt
Location

Clonmel railway station serves the town of Clonmel in County Tipperary, Ireland.

It is on the railway line that links Waterford and Limerick Junction. It has a weekday passenger service of two trains to Limerick Junction and two to Waterford. There is no Sunday service.

Limerick Junction provides connections to Limerick, Cork Kent, Tralee, Galway and Dublin Heuston. Waterford provides connections to Kilkenny and also Dublin Heuston.

⇒ Eastbound	towards Waterford ⇒
⇐ Westbound	towards Limerick Junction ⇐

The station has a café (reopened in 2013), waiting room and toilets. Bus Éireann routes 55, 245 & 355 serve the station.

== History ==
The Waterford and Limerick Railway opened the station on 1 May 1852. The company was renamed the Waterford, Limerick and Western in 1896 and merged with the Great Southern and Western Railway in 1901.

In 1880 the Southern Railway of Ireland opened between Clonmel and Thurles on the Dublin–Cork railway line, making Clonmel a junction. CIÉ withdrew passenger services from the Thurles – Clonmel line in 1963 and closed the line to freight in 1967.

== Statistics ==
Year	Daily Passengers Exit and Entry	Change
2012	75	NA
2013	54	▼21
2014	49	▼5
2015	40	▼9
2016	45	▲5
2017	57	▲12

== Services ==
Preceding station	Iarnród Éireann	Following station
Cahir	InterCity; Limerick–Rosslare railway line	Carrick-on-Suir
	Disused railways	
Cahir	Great Southern and Western Railway; Limerick–Waterford railway line	Kilsheelan
	Disused railways	
terminus	Great Southern and Western Railway; Thurles–Clonmel line	Fethard

== See also ==
- List of railway stations in Ireland
