= Thomastown railway station =

Train station in Thomastown, Ireland

Thomastown Baile Mhic Andáin
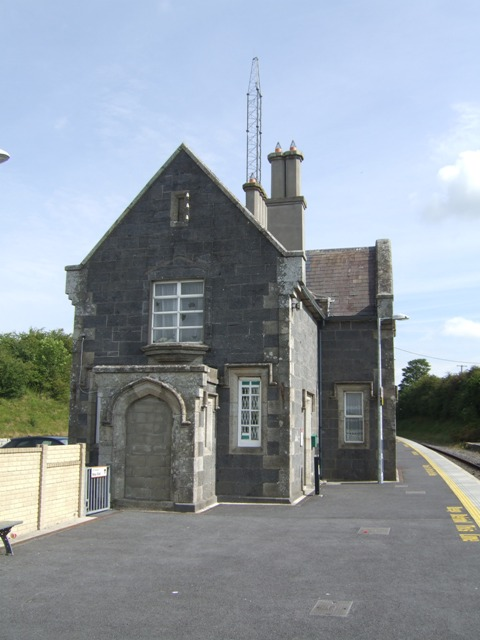
- Thomastown railway station

General information
- Location: Newtown, Thomastown; County Kilkenny, R95 N298; Ireland
- Coordinates: 52.523171°N 7.149034°W
- Owner: Iarnród Éireann
- Operator: Iarnród Éireann
- Platforms: 1

Construction
- Structure type: At-grade

Other information
- Station code: THTWN
- Fare zone: L

Key dates
- 12 May 1848: opened
Location

Thomastown Railway Station serves the town of Thomastown in County Kilkenny, Ireland.

It is a station on the Dublin to Waterford Intercity route.

== History ==
The station opened on 12 May 1848 upon the opening of the Waterford and Kilkenny Railway.

== Facilities ==
Unlike most other railway stations on the network, there is no ticket office however tickets can still be purchased at a digital kiosk.

There is a disused low platform and signal box across the track. The track was removed from it in 2004 when mini-CTC signalling was installed.

== Services ==
The current Monday to Saturday service pattern is:

- 7 trains per day to Waterford
- 7 trains per day to Dublin Heuston

On Sundays, the service pattern is:

- 4 trains per day to Waterford
- 4 trains per day to Dublin Heuston

| Preceding station | Iarnród Éireann | Following station |
|---|---|---|
| Kilkenny; MacDonagh | InterCity; Dublin-Waterford railway line | Waterford; Plunkett |

== Gallery ==
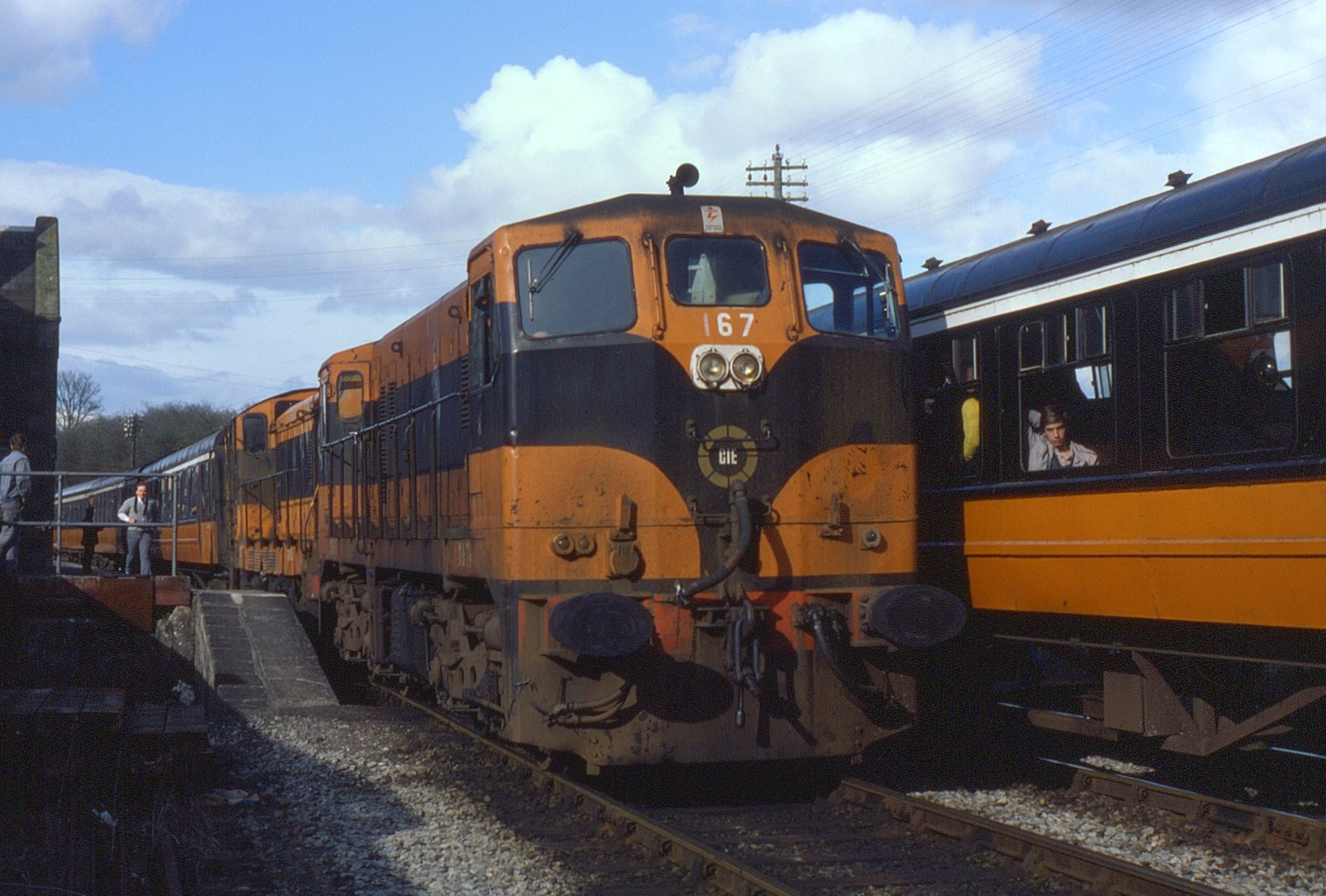
Thomastown in 1985.

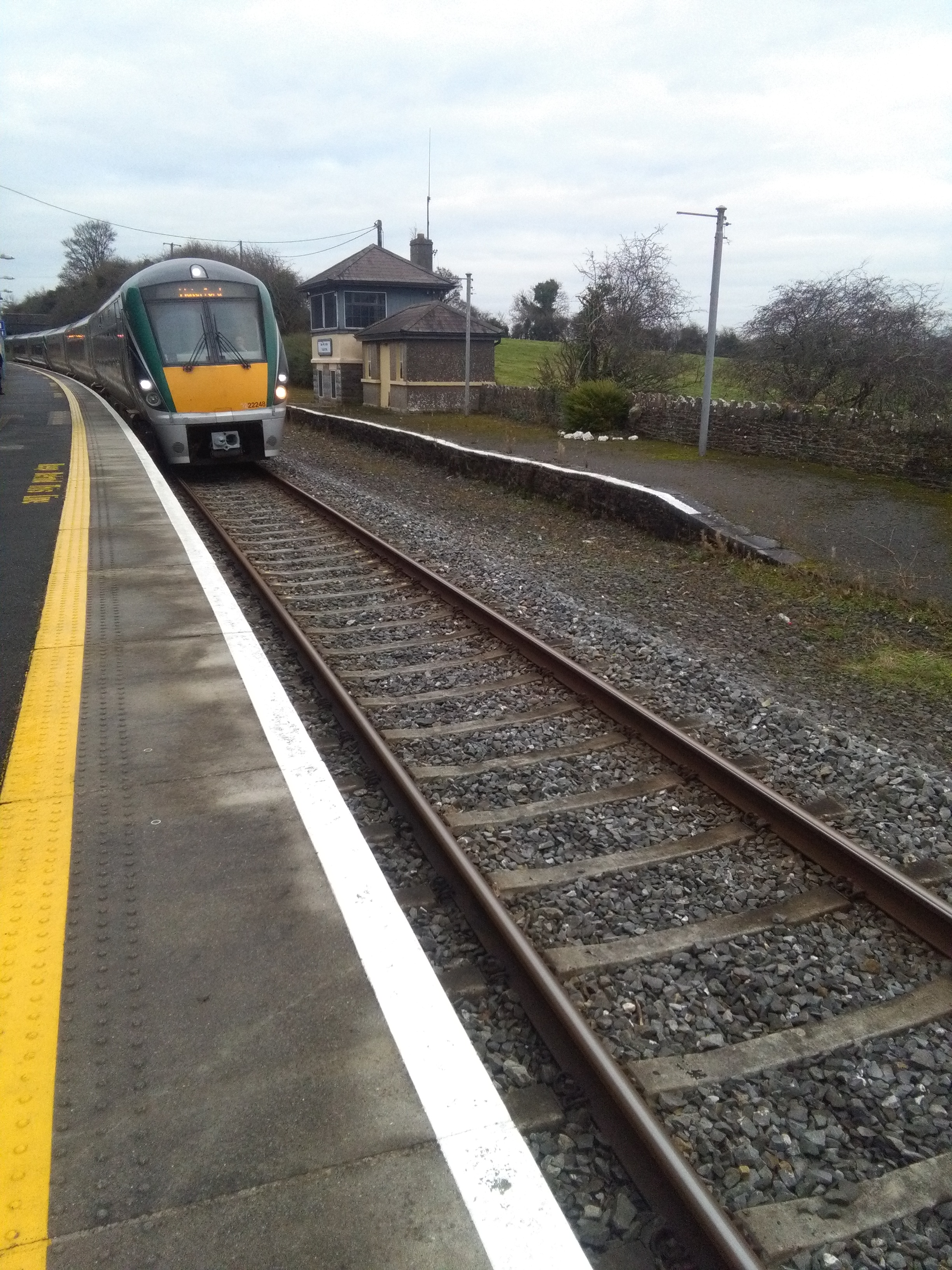
The station today. Note that only one platform remains in use.

== See also ==
- List of railway stations in Ireland
