= Lavistown loop line =

Coordinates: 52.637°N 7.189°W

Lavistown Loop Line

Overview
- Status: Operational
- Owner: Iarnród Éireann
- Locale: Maddockstown, County Kilkenny
- Termini: Dublin Heuston – Kilkenny; Kilkenny – Waterford
- Stations: 0

Service
- Type: Heavy rail
- Rolling stock: 22000 Class; 071 Class; 201 Class

History
- Opened: 25 March 1996

Technical
- Line length: .56 mi (0.90 km)
- Number of tracks: 1
- Track gauge: 1,600 mm (5 ft 3 in)
- Operating speed: 25 mph (40 km/h)

The Lavistown Loop Line provides an important function in transporting freight and timber liner trains on the Dublin–Waterford line. Before the loop was constructed, freight and timber liner trains would have to turn around at Kilkenny railway station to continue on to their destination in Sallypark, near Waterford. Approval for construction was given by Minister Brian Cowen on 2 December 1994. Non-passenger trains such as the "DFDS Freight Train" from Ballina–Waterford avoid Kilkenny by using the Lavistown Loop Line which joins both lines going to Kilkenny. The loop has allowed Irish Rail to run a daily morning limited stop service between Waterford and Heuston, Dublin, departing Waterford at 07.10 and arriving in Heuston at 09.01.
