= Kilkenny MacDonagh railway station =

Railway station serving Kilkenny, Ireland

Kilkenny MacDonagh Stáisiún Mhic Dhonnchadha
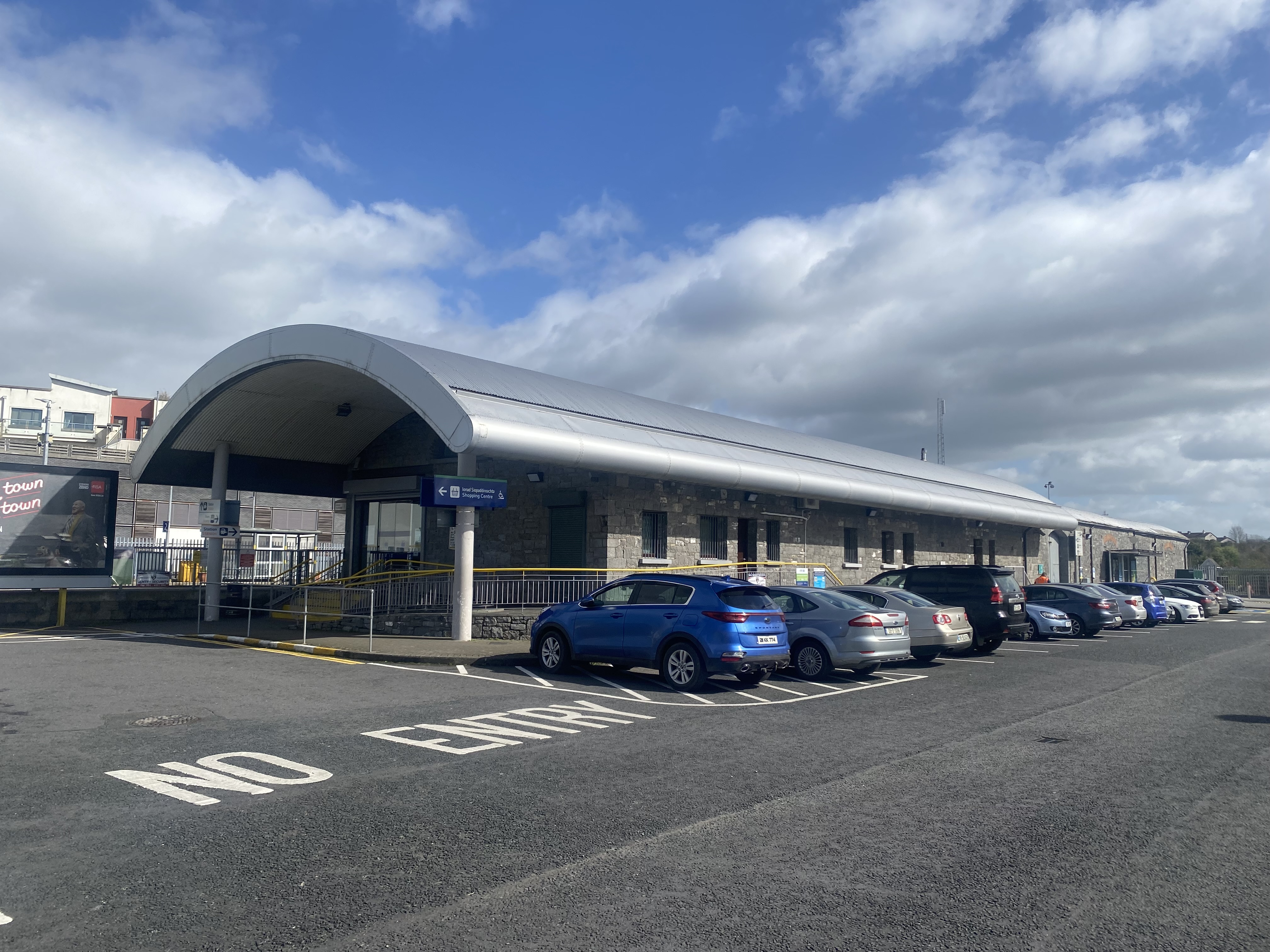
- Kilkenny MacDonagh station in 2024

General information
- Location: Dublin Road, Kilkenny; County Kilkenny, R95 AWY8; Ireland
- Coordinates: 52.654167°N 7.243611°W
- Owner: Iarnród Éireann
- Operator: Iarnród Éireann
- Platforms: 2
- Bus routes: 4
- Bus operators: Bus Eireann; City Direct; Dublin Coach; Dunnes Coaches; JJ Kavanagh and Sons; TFI Local Link
- Connections: 73; 374; 600; 717; 817C; 881; 891; 897; IW01; KK1; KK2

Construction
- Structure type: At-grade

Other information
- Station code: KKNNY
- Fare zone: K

Key dates
- 12 May 1848: Station opened
- c. 2000: Station relocated
Location

Kilkenny railway station (MacDonagh Station, Irish: Stáisiún Mhic Dhonnchadha) serves the city of Kilkenny in County Kilkenny.

It is a station on the Dublin to Waterford intercity route. and was given the name MacDonagh on 10 April 1966 in commemoration of Thomas MacDonagh, one of the executed leaders of the Easter Rising of 1916.

It is on a short spur off the main railway line, at a distance of approximately 4.5 km from the Lavistown Loop Line. This requires trains to exit the station in the same direction from which they entered. This meant shunting the locomotive from one end of the train to the other. Today the use of IE 22000 Class railcars has eliminated the need for this procedure.

== Previous station ==
The station opened on 12 May 1848 as the terminus of the Waterford and Kilkenny Railway.

On 14 November 1850 the Irish South-Eastern Railway connection to Carlow was opened, which branched off at Lavistown. In 1867 the line from Waterford was extended from Kilkenny to Portlaoise (formerly Maryborough). This line closed in 1962. A branch line from Kilkenny to Castlecomer was opened in 1919 and closed on 1 January 1963.

The old station can be seen at the bottom of the platforms, facing north. There were 3 platforms: 2 through, and 1 bay facing Waterford/Dublin via Carlow. The two through tracks carried on over a bridge, onwards to Maryborough (Now Portlaoise) or Castlecomer. This allowed running of trains from Dublin to Waterford without the need for a runaround. However, when many rural lines in the Irish Railway network shut down, the station reverted to its current state. The old Building had separate waiting-rooms for Ladies and Gentlemen and an underpass to the island platform. Formerly, locomotives could run around here, although since 2011 this is not possible any more.

== Present day ==
In 2011 the tracks northwest of the two platforms were lifted, and a connection between the two platforms was built across them. This provides level access to Platform 2, creating a layout similar to Howth railway station and abolishing the runaround facility. The footbridge, formerly the only connection between the platforms, was difficult to climb during cold weather.

The old cargo shed south of the tracks has been transformed into the new station building and is equipped with

- 1 TVM
- A ticket office
- A now defunct FasTrack office
- A small shop
- Toilets

It is fully accessible with a ramp from outside.

== Services ==
The current Monday to Saturday service pattern is:

- 7 trains per day to Waterford
- 7 trains per day to Dublin Heuston

On Sundays, the service pattern is:

- 4 trains per day to Waterford
- 4 trains per day to Dublin Heuston

Preceding station	Iarnród Éireann	Following station
Muine Bheag (Bagenalstown)	InterCity; Dublin-Waterford	Thomastown

== Bus links ==
Bus Éireann services 073 & 374 stop outside the station at a bus shelter at the side of the station.

== See also ==
- List of railway stations in Ireland
