= List of railway stations in Ireland =

This article lists railway stations both in the Republic of Ireland and Northern Ireland. The stations in the Republic of Ireland are generally operated by Iarnród Éireann and stations in Northern Ireland are generally operated by NI Railways, with some along the Dublin-Belfast line served by both.

Information about stations in the Republic of Ireland is sourced from IÉ's API, while details for stations in Northern Ireland served by the Enterprise come from the same source. Details for other Northern Irish stations are obtained from the Translink NI Railways API. Some stations have dual codes, with one for the IÉ network and another for the NI Railways network; both codes are included here.

== Table ==
English name	Irish name	Coordinates	Location	Railway Route
Portrush		55.202554°N 6.653696°W	Northern Ireland	Coleraine-Portrush line
Dhu Varren		55.196389°N 6.661389°W	Northern Ireland	Coleraine-Portrush line
Castlerock		55.165278°N 6.786944°W	Northern Ireland	Belfast-Derry line
University (Northern Ireland)		55.150556°N 6.668333°W	Northern Ireland	Coleraine-Portrush line
Coleraine		55.133856°N 6.662937°W	Northern Ireland	Belfast-Derry line and Coleraine-Portrush line
Bellarena		55.126667°N 6.951667°W	Northern Ireland	Belfast-Derry line
Ballymoney		55.066667°N 6.513889°W	Northern Ireland	Belfast-Derry line
Derry ~ Londonderry		54.992069°N 7.313788°W	Northern Ireland	Belfast-Derry line
Cullybackey		54.888056°N 6.344722°W	Northern Ireland	Belfast-Derry line
Ballymena		54.864167°N 6.284722°W	Northern Ireland	Belfast-Derry line
Larne Town		54.850278°N 5.814167°W	Northern Ireland	Belfast-Larne line
Larne Harbour		54.848056°N 5.798611°W	Northern Ireland	Belfast-Larne line
Glynn		54.826944°N 5.80750°W	Northern Ireland	Belfast-Larne line
Magheramorne		54.815556°N 5.766667°W	Northern Ireland	Belfast-Larne line
Ballycarry		54.776944°N 5.726111°W	Northern Ireland	Belfast-Larne line
Whitehead		54.752778°N 5.709444°W	Northern Ireland	Belfast-Larne line
Downshire		54.721111°N 5.790278°W	Northern Ireland	Belfast-Larne line
Antrim		54.718333°N 6.211389°W	Northern Ireland	Belfast-Derry line
Clipperstown		54.71750°N 5.816389°W	Northern Ireland	Belfast-Larne line
Carrickfergus		54.717422°N 5.809689°W	Northern Ireland	Belfast-Larne line
Trooperslane		54.710059°N 5.849477°W	Northern Ireland	Belfast-Larne line
Greenisland		54.700278°N 5.873333°W	Northern Ireland	Belfast-Larne line
Mossley West		54.696111°N 5.951389°W	Northern Ireland	Belfast-Derry line
Jordanstown		54.687222°N 5.895556°W	Northern Ireland	Belfast–Larne line
Whiteabbey		54.672778°N 5.904444°W	Northern Ireland	Belfast–Larne line & Belfast–Derry line
Helen's Bay		54.666389°N 5.740833°W	Northern Ireland	Belfast–Bangor line
Carnalea		54.666111°N 5.705833°W	Northern Ireland	Belfast–Bangor line
Seahill		54.660833°N 5.768056°W	Northern Ireland	Belfast–Bangor line
Bangor West		54.659444°N 5.692778°W	Northern Ireland	Belfast–Bangor line
Bangor Rail Centre		54.658611°N 5.6725°W	Northern Ireland	Belfast–Bangor line
Cultra		54.652222°N 5.8050°W	Northern Ireland	Belfast–Bangor line
Marino (Northern Ireland)		54.646944°N 5.8175°W	Northern Ireland	Belfast–Bangor line
Holywood (Northern Ireland)		54.641111°N 5.839444°W	Northern Ireland	Belfast–Bangor line
York Street		54.610556°N 5.922222°W	Northern Ireland	Belfast–Derry line & Belfast–Larne line
Sydenham (Northern Ireland)		54.609167°N 5.877222°W	Northern Ireland	Belfast–Bangor line
Titanic Quarter		54.601944°N 5.906389°W	Northern Ireland	Belfast–Bangor line
Belfast Lanyon Place		54.595278°N 5.917222°W	Northern Ireland	Belfast–Bangor line, Belfast–Larne line & Belfast–Derry line
Belfast Grand Central		54.594767°N 5.939789°W	Northern Ireland	Belfast–Bangor line, Belfast–Derry line, Belfast–Dublin line & Belfast–Larne line
City Hospital		54.588611°N 5.940278°W	Northern Ireland	Belfast–Bangor line, Belfast–Derry line & Belfast–Larne line
Botanic		54.588333°N 5.932778°W	Northern Ireland	Belfast–Bangor line, Belfast–Derry line & Belfast–Larne line
Adelaide (Northern Ireland)		54.578333°N 5.9550°W	Northern Ireland	Belfast–Dublin line
Balmoral		54.568889°N 5.968333°W	Northern Ireland	Belfast–Dublin line
Finaghy		54.563889°N 5.986667°W	Northern Ireland	Belfast–Dublin line
Dunmurry		54.553076°N 6.003059°W	Northern Ireland	Belfast–Dublin line
Derriaghy		54.541594°N 6.018338°W	Northern Ireland	Belfast–Dublin line
Lambeg		54.529553°N 6.029675°W	Northern Ireland	Belfast–Dublin line
Hilden		54.522778°N 6.029444°W	Northern Ireland	Belfast–Dublin line
Lisburn		54.514054°N 6.045811°W	Northern Ireland	Belfast–Dublin line
Moira		54.491944°N 6.215°W	Northern Ireland	Belfast–Dublin line
Lurgan		54.466944°N 6.338056°W	Northern Ireland	Belfast–Dublin line
Portadown		54.425°N 6.446111°W	Northern Ireland	Belfast–Dublin line
Scarva		54.332222°N 6.366389°W	Northern Ireland	Belfast–Dublin line
Poyntzpass		54.2925°N 6.371944°W	Northern Ireland	Belfast–Dublin line
Newry		54.188611°N 6.3625°W	Northern Ireland	Belfast–Dublin line
Sligo Mac Diarmada	Sligeach Sheáin Mhic Dhiarmada	54.2723°N 8.48249°W	Republic of Ireland	Dublin-Sligo railway line
Collooney	Cúil Mhuine	54.1871°N 8.49453°W	Republic of Ireland	Dublin-Sligo railway line
Ballina	Béal an Átha	54.1085°N 9.16146°W	Republic of Ireland	Ballina branch line
Ballymote	Baile an Mhóta	54.0887°N 8.52088°W	Republic of Ireland	Dublin-Sligo railway line
Dundalk Clarke	Stáisiún Uí Chléirigh	54.0007°N 6.41291°W	Republic of Ireland	Northern Commuter, Belfast–Dublin line
Foxford	Béal Easa	53.983°N 9.1364°W	Republic of Ireland	Ballina branch line
Boyle	Mainistir na Búille	53.9676°N 8.30438°W	Republic of Ireland	Dublin-Sligo railway line
Carrick-on-Shannon	Cora Droma Rúisc	53.9383°N 8.10657°W	Republic of Ireland	Dublin-Sligo railway line
Dromod	Dromad	53.8591°N 7.9164°W	Republic of Ireland	Dublin-Sligo railway line
Castlebar	Caisleán an Bharraigh	53.8471°N 9.2873°W	Republic of Ireland	Dublin-Westport/Galway railway line
Manulla Junction	Gabhal Mhaigh Nulla	53.828°N 9.19296°W	Republic of Ireland	Ballina branch line and Dublin-Westport/Galway railway line
Westport	Cathair na Mart	53.7955°N 9.50885°W	Republic of Ireland	Dublin-Westport/Galway railway line
Ballyhaunis	Béal Átha hAmhnais	53.7616°N 8.7584°W	Republic of Ireland	Dublin-Westport/Galway railway line
Castlerea	An Caisleán Riabhach	53.7612°N 8.48448°W	Republic of Ireland	Dublin-Westport/Galway railway line
Longford	An Longfort	53.7243°N 7.79574°W	Republic of Ireland	Dublin-Sligo railway line
Claremorris	Clár Chlainne Mhuiris	53.7204°N 9.00222°W	Republic of Ireland	Dublin-Westport/Galway railway line and Western Rail Corridor
Drogheda (MacBride)	Stáisiún Mhic Ghiolla Bhríde	53.712°N 6.33538°W	Republic of Ireland	Northern Commuter & Belfast–Dublin line
Edgeworthstown	Meathas Troim	53.6888°N 7.60299°W	Republic of Ireland	Dublin-Sligo railway line
Laytown	An Inse	53.6794°N 6.24253°W	Republic of Ireland	Northern Commuter
Gormanston	Baile Mhic Gormáin	53.638°N 6.21705°W	Republic of Ireland	Northern Commuter & Belfast–Dublin line
Roscommon	Ros Comáin	53.6243°N 8.19631°W	Republic of Ireland	Dublin-Westport/Galway railway line
Balbriggan	Baile Brigín	53.6118°N 6.18226°W	Republic of Ireland	Northern Commuter & Belfast–Dublin line
Skerries	Na Sceirí	53.5741°N 6.11933°W	Republic of Ireland	Northern Commuter & Belfast–Dublin line
Mullingar	An Muileann gCearr	53.523°N 7.34608°W	Republic of Ireland	Dublin-Sligo railway line
Rush and Lusk	An Ros agus Lusca	53.5201°N 6.1439°W	Republic of Ireland	Northern Commuter & Belfast–Dublin line
Donabate	Domhnach Bat	53.4855°N 6.15134°W	Republic of Ireland	Northern Commuter & Belfast–Dublin line
Malahide	Mullach Íde	53.4509°N 6.15649°W	Republic of Ireland	Northern Commuter, Belfast–Dublin line & Dublin Area Rapid Transit
M3 Parkway	Ollpháirc M3	53.4349°N 6.46898°W	Republic of Ireland	Western Commuter
Athlone	Baile Átha Luain	53.4273°N 7.93683°W	Republic of Ireland	Dublin-Westport/Galway railway line
Dunboyne	Dún Búinne	53.4175°N 6.46483°W	Republic of Ireland	Western Commuter
Portmarnock	Port Mearnóg	53.4169°N 6.1512°W	Republic of Ireland	Northern Commuter, DART & Belfast–Dublin line
Enfield	An Bóthar Buí	53.4157°N 6.83395°W	Republic of Ireland	Dublin–Sligo railway line & Western Commuter
Kilcock	Cill Choca	53.4043°N 6.67892°W	Republic of Ireland	Dublin-Sligo railway line & Western Commuter
Clongriffin	Cluain Ghrífín	53.4032°N 6.14839°W	Republic of Ireland	Northern Commuter & DART
Sutton	Cill Fhionntain	53.392°N 6.11448°W	Republic of Ireland	DART
Bayside	Cois Bá	53.3917°N 6.13678°W	Republic of Ireland	DART
Howth Junction & Donaghmede	Gabhal Bhinn Éadair ⁊ Domhnach Míde	53.3909°N 6.15672°W	Republic of Ireland	Northern Commuter, Belfast–Dublin line & DART
Howth	Binn Éadair	53.3891°N 6.07401°W	Republic of Ireland	DART
Kilbarrack	Cill Bharróg	53.387°N 6.16163°W	Republic of Ireland	DART
Hansfield	Páirc Hans	53.3853°N 6.44205°W	Republic of Ireland	Western Commuter
Clonsilla	Cluain Saileach	53.3831°N 6.4242°W	Republic of Ireland	Western Commuter
Castleknock	Caisleán Cnucha	53.3816°N 6.37149°W	Republic of Ireland	Western Commuter
Raheny	Ráth Eanaigh	53.3815°N 6.17699°W	Republic of Ireland	Belfast–Dublin line & DART
Harmonstown	Baile Hearman	53.3786°N 6.19131°W	Republic of Ireland	Belfast–Dublin line & DART
Maynooth	Maigh Nuad	53.378°N 6.58993°W	Republic of Ireland	Dublin-Sligo railway line & Western Commuter
Navan Road Parkway	Ollpháirc Bhóthar na hUaimhe	53.3777°N 6.34591°W	Republic of Ireland	Western Commuter
Coolmine	Cúil Mhín	53.3776°N 6.39072°W	Republic of Ireland	Western Commuter
Ashtown	Baile an Ásaigh	53.3755°N 6.33135°W	Republic of Ireland	Western Commuter
Pelletstown	Baile Pheiléid	53.3752°N 6.31388°W	Republic of Ireland	Western Commuter
Leixlip Confey	Léim an Bhradáin Confaí	53.3743°N 6.48624°W	Republic of Ireland	Western Commuter
Killester	Cill Easra	53.373°N 6.20442°W	Republic of Ireland	DART
Broombridge	Droichead Broome	53.3725°N 6.29869°W	Republic of Ireland	Dublin–Sligo railway line & Western Commuter
Leixlip Louisa Bridge	Léim an Bhradáin Droichead Louisa	53.3704°N 6.50598°W	Republic of Ireland	Western Commuter
Drumcondra	Droim Chonrach	53.3632°N 6.25908°W	Republic of Ireland	Dublin–Sligo railway line, Western Commuter & South Western Commuter
Clontarf Road	Bóthar Chluain Tarbh	53.3629°N 6.22753°W	Republic of Ireland	Belfast–Dublin line & DART
Connolly	Stáisiún Uí Chonghaile	53.3531°N 6.24591°W	Republic of Ireland	Belfast–Dublin line, Dublin–Sligo railway line, Dublin–Rosslare railway line & DART
Docklands	Dugthailte / Ceantar na nDugaí	53.3509°N 6.23929°W	Republic of Ireland	Western Commuter
Tara Street	Sráid na Teamhrach	53.347°N 6.25425°W	Republic of Ireland	DART
Dublin Heuston	Stáisiún Heuston	53.3464°N 6.29461°W	Republic of Ireland	Dublin–Cork railway line Dublin–Waterford railway line Dublin–Westport/Galway railway line Mallow–Tralee railway line South Western Commuter
Dublin Pearse	Stáisiún na bPiarsach	53.3433°N 6.24829°W	Republic of Ireland	Dublin–Rosslare railway line, South Eastern Commuter & DART
Woodlawn	Móta	53.3432°N 8.47231°W	Republic of Ireland	Dublin-Westport/Galway railway line
Grand Canal Dock	Dug na Canálach Móire	53.3397°N 6.23773°W	Republic of Ireland	South Eastern Commuter & DART
Clara	Clóirtheach	53.3395°N 7.61596°W	Republic of Ireland	Dublin-Westport/Galway railway line
Ballinasloe	Béal Átha na Sluaighe	53.3363°N 8.24081°W	Republic of Ireland	Dublin-Westport/Galway railway line
Adamstown	Baile Adaim	53.3353°N 6.45233°W	Republic of Ireland	South Western Commuter
Lansdowne Road	Bóthar Lansdún	53.3347°N 6.22979°W	Republic of Ireland	South Eastern Commuter & DART
Kishoge	An Chiseog	53.3345°N 6.4304°W	Republic of Ireland	South Western Commuter
Park West and Cherry Orchard	An Páirc Thiar ⁊ Gort na Síliní	53.334°N 6.37868°W	Republic of Ireland	South Western Commuter
Clondalkin/Fonthill	Cluain Dolcáin / Cnoc an Fhuaráin	53.3334°N 6.40628°W	Republic of Ireland	South Western Commuter
Sandymount	Dumhach Thrá	53.3281°N 6.22116°W	Republic of Ireland	DART
Hazelhatch and Celbridge	Collchoill agus Cill Droichid	53.3223°N 6.52356°W	Republic of Ireland	Dublin–Westport/Galway railway line Dublin–Waterford railway line South Western Commuter
Attymon	Áth Tíomáin	53.3212°N 8.60608°W	Republic of Ireland	Dublin-Westport/Galway railway line
Sydney Parade	Paráid Sydney	53.3206°N 6.21112°W	Republic of Ireland	South Eastern Commuter & DART
Booterstown	Baile an Bhóthair	53.3099°N 6.19498°W	Republic of Ireland	DART
Blackrock	An Charraig Dhubh	53.3027°N 6.17833°W	Republic of Ireland	Dublin–Rosslare railway line Northern Commuter; Western Commuter; South Eastern Commuter; DART
Athenry	Baile Átha an Rí	53.3015°N 8.74855°W	Republic of Ireland	Dublin-Westport/Galway railway line Western Railway Corridor; Galway Suburban Rail
Oranmore	Órán Mór	53.27586°N 8.94572°W	Republic of Ireland	Dublin-Westport/Galway railway line Western Railway Corridor; Galway Suburban Rail
Seapoint	Rinn na Mara	53.2991°N 6.16512°W	Republic of Ireland	DART
Salthill and Monkstown	Cnoc an tSalainn agus Baile na Manach	53.2954°N 6.15206°W	Republic of Ireland	DART
Dún Laoghaire Mallin	Stáisiún Uí Mhealláin	53.2951°N 6.13498°W	Republic of Ireland	Dublin–Rosslare railway line, Northern Commuter, Western Commuter, South Eastern Commuter & DART
Sandycove and Glasthule	Cuas an Ghainimh agus Glas Tuathail	53.2878°N 6.12712°W	Republic of Ireland	DART
Glenageary	Gleann na gCaorach	53.2812°N 6.12289°W	Republic of Ireland	DART
Dalkey	Deilginis	53.2756°N 6.10333°W	Republic of Ireland	DART
Galway	Stáisiún Cheannt	53.2736°N 9.04696°W	Republic of Ireland	Dublin-Westport/Galway railway line, Western Railway Corridor & Galway Suburban Rail
Tullamore	Tulach Mhór	53.2704°N 7.49985°W	Republic of Ireland	Dublin-Westport/Galway railway line & Ballina branch line
Killiney	Cill Iníon Léinín	53.2557°N 6.11317°W	Republic of Ireland	DART
Sallins and Naas	Na Solláin agus An Nás	53.2469°N 6.66386°W	Republic of Ireland	Dublin–Westport/Galway railway line & South Western Commuter
Shankill	Seanchill	53.2364°N 6.11691°W	Republic of Ireland	DART
Craughwell	Creachmhaoil	53.2252°N 8.7359°W	Republic of Ireland	Western Railway Corridor
Woodbrook	Shruthán na Coille	53.2183°N 6.1094°W	Republic of Ireland	DART
Bray	Bré Uí Dhálaigh	53.2043°N 6.10046°W	Republic of Ireland	Dublin–Rosslare railway line, South Eastern Commuter, Northern Commuter, Western Commuter & DART
Newbridge (Ireland)	An Droichead Nua	53.1855°N 6.80807°W	Republic of Ireland	Dublin–Waterford railway line, Dublin–Westport/Galway railway line & South Western Commuter
Kildare	Cill Dara	53.163°N 6.90802°W	Republic of Ireland	Mallow–Tralee railway line, Dublin–Cork railway line, Dublin–Westport/Galway railway line, Dublin–Waterford railway line & South Western Commuter
Ardrahan	Ard Raithin	53.1572°N 8.81483°W	Republic of Ireland	Western Railway Corridor
Portarlington	Cúil an tSúdaire	53.146°N 7.18055°W	Republic of Ireland	Mallow–Tralee railway line, Dublin-Westport/Galway railway line, Ballina branch line & South Western Commuter
Monasterevin	Mainistir Eimhín	53.1454°N 7.06361°W	Republic of Ireland	Dublin–Westport/Galway railway line & South Western Commuter
Greystones	Na Clocha Liatha	53.1442°N 6.06085°W	Republic of Ireland	Dublin–Rosslare railway line, South Eastern Commuter & DART
Kilcoole	Cill Chomhghaill	53.107°N 6.04112°W	Republic of Ireland	Dublin–Rosslare railway line & South Eastern Commuter
Gort	An Gort	53.0653°N 8.81595°W	Republic of Ireland	Western Railway Corridor
Portlaoise	Port Laoise	53.0371°N 7.30086°W	Republic of Ireland	Dublin-Cork railway line & South Western Commuter
Athy	Baile Átha Í	52.992°N 6.9762°W	Republic of Ireland	Dublin–Waterford railway line
Wicklow	Cill Mhantáin	52.9882°N 6.05338°W	Republic of Ireland	Dublin–Rosslare railway line & South Eastern Commuter
Roscrea	Ros Cré	52.9607°N 7.7941°W	Republic of Ireland	Limerick-Ballybrophy railway line
Cloughjordan	Cloch Shiurdáin	52.9363°N 8.0246°W	Republic of Ireland	Limerick-Ballybrophy railway line
Rathdrum	Ráth Droma	52.9295°N 6.22641°W	Republic of Ireland	Dublin–Rosslare railway line & South Eastern Commuter
Ballybrophy	Baile Uí Bhróithe	52.8999°N 7.60259°W	Republic of Ireland	Dublin-Cork railway line, Limerick-Ballybrophy railway line & South Western Commuter
Nenagh	An tAonach	52.8605°N 8.19471°W	Republic of Ireland	Limerick-Ballybrophy railway line
Carlow	Ceatharlach	52.8407°N 6.92217°W	Republic of Ireland	Dublin–Waterford railway line
Ennis	Inis	52.8386°N 8.97491°W	Republic of Ireland	Western Railway Corridor & Limerick Suburban Rail
Arklow	An tInbhear Mór	52.7932°N 6.15994°W	Republic of Ireland	Dublin–Rosslare railway line & South Eastern Commuter
Templemore	An Teampall Mór	52.7878°N 7.82293°W	Republic of Ireland	Dublin–Cork railway line
Birdhill	Cnocán an Éin Fhinn	52.7656°N 8.44247°W	Republic of Ireland	Limerick-Ballybrophy railway line
Sixmilebridge	Droichead Abhann Ó gCearnaigh	52.7376°N 8.78427°W	Republic of Ireland	Western Railway Corridor & Limerick Suburban Rail
Castleconnell	Caisleán Uí Chonaill	52.7128°N 8.49794°W	Republic of Ireland	Limerick-Ballybrophy railway line & Limerick Suburban Rail
Muine Bheag (Bagenalstown)	Muine Bheag	52.699°N 6.95213°W	Republic of Ireland	Dublin–Waterford railway line
Thurles	Durlas	52.6766°N 7.82189°W	Republic of Ireland	Dublin–Cork railway line
Gorey	Guaire	52.6712°N 6.29195°W	Republic of Ireland	Dublin–Rosslare railway line & South Eastern Commuter
Limerick Colbert	Stáisiún Uí Cholbáird	52.6587°N 8.62397°W	Republic of Ireland	Dublin–Cork railway line, Limerick Suburban Rail & Western Railway Corridor
Kilkenny MacDonagh	Stáisiún Mhic Dhonnchadha	52.655°N 7.24498°W	Republic of Ireland	Dublin–Waterford railway line
Thomastown	Baile Mhic Andáin	52.523°N 7.14891°W	Republic of Ireland	Dublin–Waterford railway line
Enniscorthy	Inis Córthaidh	52.5046°N 6.56627°W	Republic of Ireland	Dublin–Rosslare railway line
Limerick Junction	Gabhal Luimnigh	52.5009°N 8.20003°W	Republic of Ireland	Limerick–Rosslare railway line
Tipperary	Tiobraid Árann	52.4701°N 8.1625°W	Republic of Ireland	Limerick–Rosslare railway line
Cahir	An Chathair	52.3777°N 7.92181°W	Republic of Ireland	Limerick–Rosslare railway line
Clonmel	Cluain Meala	52.3611°N 7.69936°W	Republic of Ireland	Limerick–Rosslare railway line
Carrick-on-Suir	Carraig na Siúire	52.3487°N 7.40354°W	Republic of Ireland	Limerick–Rosslare railway line
Charleville	An Ráth	52.3468°N 8.65362°W	Republic of Ireland	Dublin–Cork railway line
Wexford	Ó hAnnracháin, Loch Garman	52.3434°N 6.4636°W	Republic of Ireland	Dublin–Rosslare railway line
Rosslare Strand	Stáisiún Trá Ros Láir	52.2726°N 6.39254°W	Republic of Ireland	Dublin–Rosslare railway line
Tralee Casement	Stáisiún Mhic Easmainn	52.271°N 9.69846°W	Republic of Ireland	Mallow–Tralee railway line
Waterford Plunkett	Stáisiún Phluincéid	52.2667°N 7.1183°W	Republic of Ireland	Dublin–Waterford railway line & Limerick–Rosslare railway line
Rosslare Europort	Stáisiún Calafort Ros Láir	52.2531°N 6.33493°W	Republic of Ireland	Dublin–Rosslare railway line
Farranfore	An Fearann Fuar	52.1733°N 9.55278°W	Republic of Ireland	Waterford–Mallow railway line
Mallow	Mala	52.1396°N 8.65521°W	Republic of Ireland	Dublin–Cork railway line, Mallow–Tralee railway line & Cork Suburban Rail
Banteer	Bántír	52.1287°N 8.89793°W	Republic of Ireland	Waterford–Mallow railway line
Rathmore	An Ráth Mhór	52.0854°N 9.21756°W	Republic of Ireland	Waterford–Mallow railway line
Millstreet	Sráid an Mhuilinn	52.0776°N 9.06973°W	Republic of Ireland	Waterford–Mallow railway line
Killarney	Stáisiún Cill Airne	52.0595°N 9.50198°W	Republic of Ireland	Waterford–Mallow railway line
Midleton	Mainistir na Corann	51.9212°N 8.17579°W	Republic of Ireland	Cork Suburban Rail
Carrigtwohill	Carraig Thuathail	51.9163°N 8.26323°W	Republic of Ireland	Cork Suburban Rail
Glounthaune	Gleanntán	51.9112°N 8.3254°W	Republic of Ireland	Cork Suburban Rail
Little Island	An tOileán Beag	51.9078°N 8.35466°W	Republic of Ireland	Cork Suburban Rail
Cork Kent	Stáisiún Cheannt	51.9018°N 8.4582°W	Republic of Ireland	Cork Suburban Rail, Mallow–Tralee railway line & Dublin–Cork railway line
Fota	Fóite	51.896°N 8.3183°W	Republic of Ireland	Cork Suburban Rail
Carrigaloe	Carraig an Ló	51.8688°N 8.32417°W	Republic of Ireland	Cork Suburban Rail
Rushbrooke halt	Rinn an Chabaltaigh	51.8496°N 8.32252°W	Republic of Ireland	Cork Suburban Rail
Cobh	An Cóbh	51.8491°N 8.29956°W	Republic of Ireland	Cork Suburban Rail

== See also ==
- List of closed railway stations in Ireland
