= Cahir railway station =

Railway station in Cahir, Ireland

Coordinates: 52.377731°N 7.922710°W

Cahir An Chathair
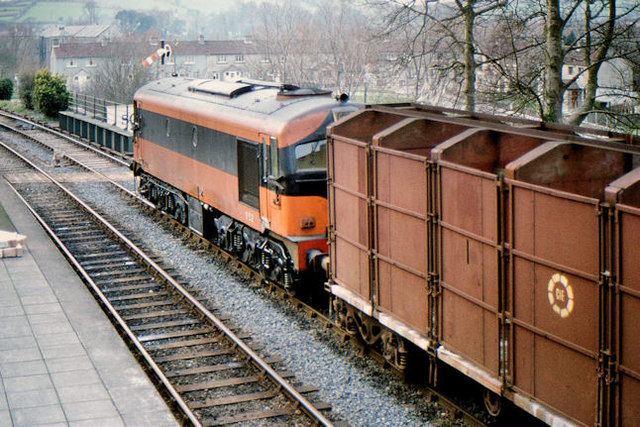
- CIE 001 Class departing Cahir station on 26 February 1982

General information
- Location: Church Street; Cahir, County Tipperary, E21 KC89; Ireland
- Owner: Iarnród Éireann
- Operator: Iarnród Éireann
- Platforms: 1
- Bus operators: TFI Local Link
- Connections: 855

Construction
- Structure type: At-grade

Other information
- Station code: CAHIR
- Fare zone: F

History
- Opened: 1 May 1852
Location

Cahir railway station serves the town of Cahir, County Tipperary in Ireland.

== History ==
The station opened on 1 May 1852.

== Services ==
It has a weekday passenger service of two trains to Limerick Junction and two to Waterford. There is no Sunday service. Until 19 January 2013 (inclusive) there were three trains each way. However, the late-morning Waterford to Limerick Junction and early-afternoon Limerick Junction to Waterford trains are now discontinued.

Passengers should change at Limerick Junction for connections to Limerick, Cork, Tralee, Galway and Dublin.

The station is unstaffed and the platform is accessible via a ramp.

Preceding station	Iarnród Éireann	Following station
Tipperary	InterCity; Limerick-Rosslare railway line	Clonmel

== See also ==
- List of railway stations in Ireland
