= Carrick-on-Suir railway station =

Railway station in County Tipperary, Ireland

Carrick-on-Suir Carraig na Siúire
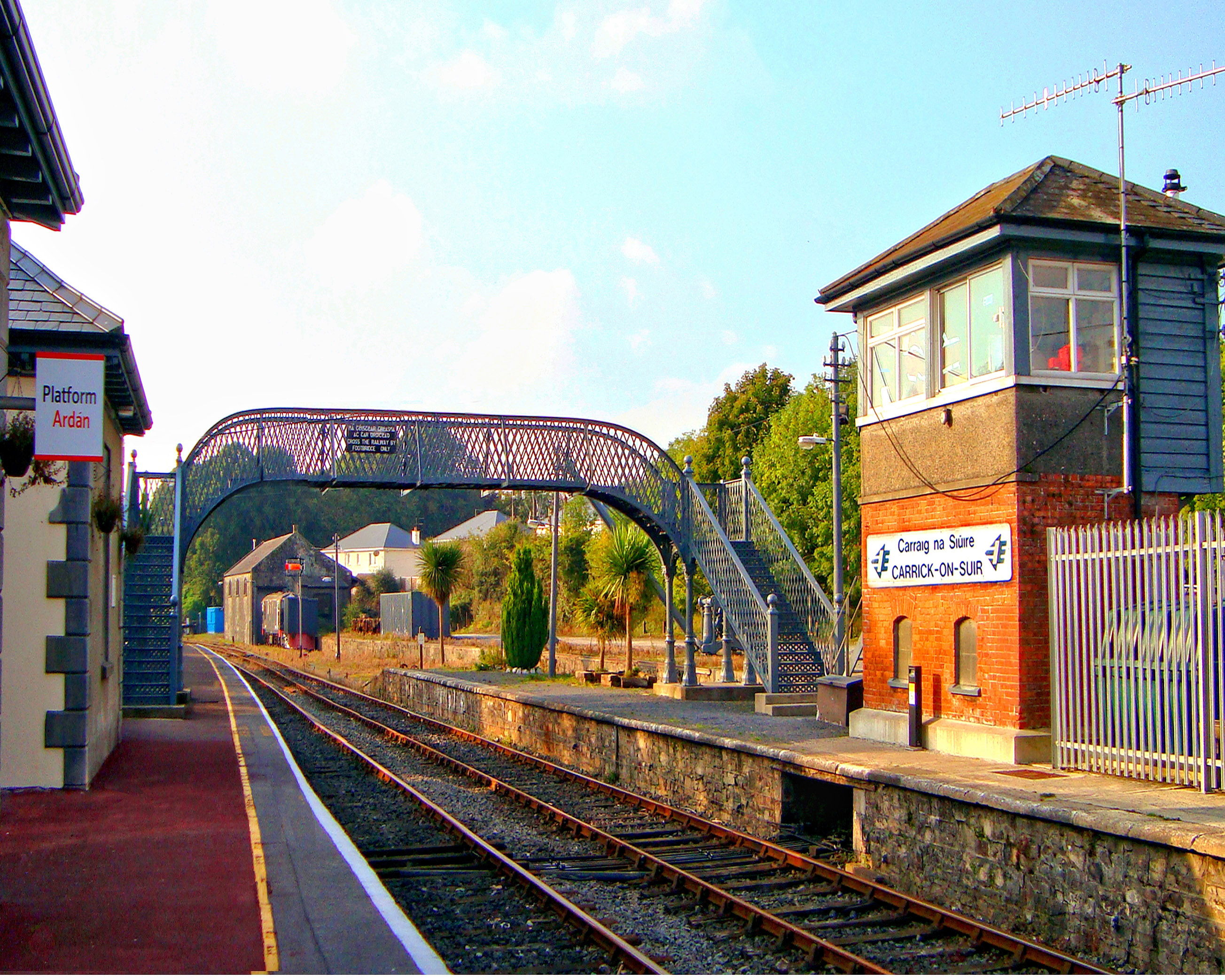

General information
- Location: Cregg Road, Carrick-on-Suir; County Tipperary, E32 XN82; Ireland
- Coordinates: 52.349084°N 7.404536°W
- Owner: Iarnród Éireann
- Operator: Iarnród Éireann
- Platforms: 2 (including 1 not in use)
- Tracks: 1

Construction
- Structure type: At-grade

Other information
- Station code: CKOSR
- Fare zone: H

History
- Opened: 15 April 1853
- Original company: Waterford, Limerick and Western Railway
- Pre-grouping: Great Southern and Western Railway
- Post-grouping: Great Southern Railways
Location

Carrick-on-Suir railway station serves the town of Carrick-on-Suir, County Tipperary in Ireland.

It has a weekday passenger service of two trains to Waterford and two to Limerick Junction. There is no Sunday service. Until 19 January 2013 (inclusive) there were three trains each way. However the late-morning Waterford to Limerick Junction and early-afternoon Limerick Junction to Waterford trains are now discontinued.

The station consists of two platforms, a waiting room, toilets and small car park at present free for rail passengers. The second platform, on which the signal cabin is located, was served by a passing loop until November 2013.

There is also a siding, used by the Irish Traction Group to store preserved diesel locomotives.

== History ==
The station opened on 15 April 1853.

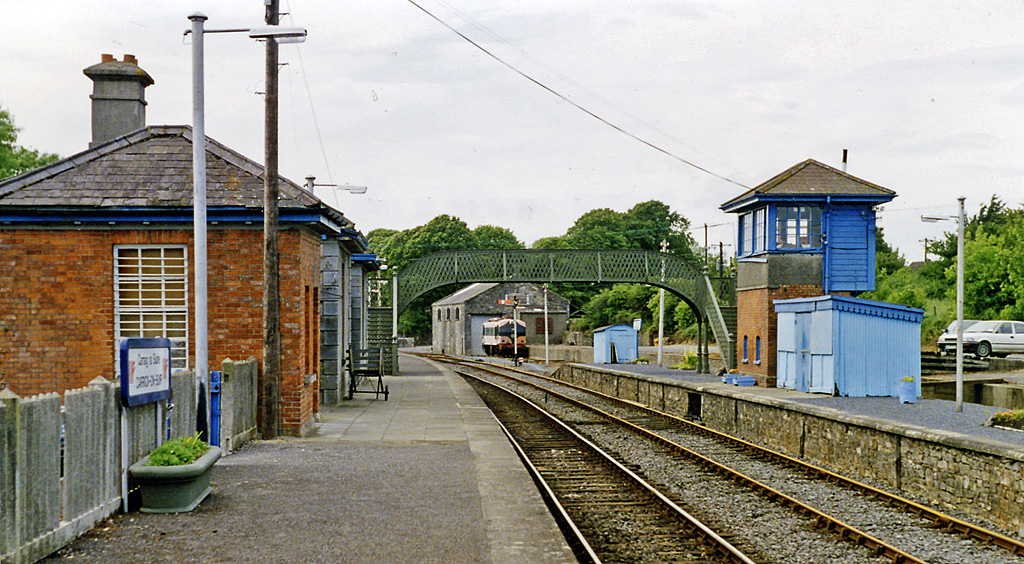
The station in 1993

== Statistics ==
Passenger statistics are compiled by the National Transport Authority. The passenger decline is due to unreliable timetables.

Year	Daily Passengers Exit and Entry	Change
2012	22	NA
2013	10	▼12
2014	13	▲3
2015	1	▼12
2016	9	▲8
2017	12	▲3

== Services ==
Preceding station	Iarnród Éireann	Following station
Clonmel	InterCity; Limerick-Rosslare railway line	Waterford; Plunkett
	Disused railways	
Kilsheelan	Great Southern and Western Railway; Limerick-Rosslare railway line	Fiddown

== See also ==
- List of railway stations in Ireland
