= Carlow railway station =

Railway station serving Carlow, Ireland

Carlow Ceatharlach
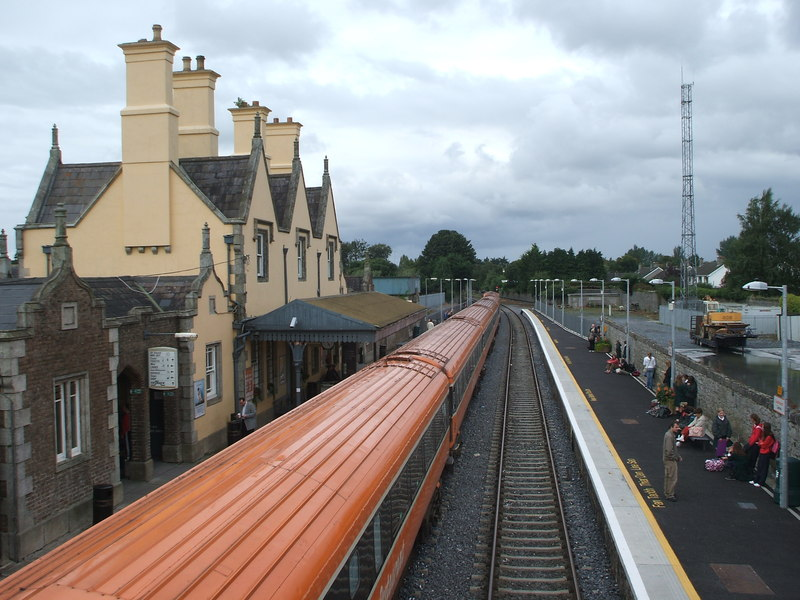
- Station as seen from the footbridge.

General information
- Location: Railway Road; Carlow, County Carlow, R93 C2C4; Republic of Ireland
- Coordinates: 52.8409°N 6.9226°W
- Owner: Iarnród Éireann
- Operator: Iarnród Éireann
- Platforms: 2
- Bus operators: TFI Local Link
- Connections: 800; 887

Construction
- Structure type: At-grade

Other information
- Station code: CRLOW
- Fare zone: G

History
- Opened: 4 August 1846
Services
Preceding station	Iarnród Éireann	Following station
Athy	InterCity; Dublin-Waterford	Muine Bheag
Location

Carlow railway station serves the town of Carlow in County Carlow. It is a station on the Dublin to Waterford intercity route. The station has two platforms. The far-side platform is only used when two trains are in the station at once, as it is not accessible other than by footbridge. The station has a café.

== History ==
The station opened on 4 August 1846 and was closed for goods traffic on 9 June 1976.

== Services ==
The current Monday to Friday service pattern is:

- 7 trains per day to Waterford
- 10 trains per day to Dublin Heuston

Preceding station	Iarnród Éireann	Following station
Athy	InterCity; Dublin-Waterford	Muine Bheag (Bagenalstown)

== See also ==
- List of railway stations in Ireland
