= Dublin–Waterford railway line =

Railway line in Ireland

Dublin to Waterford line
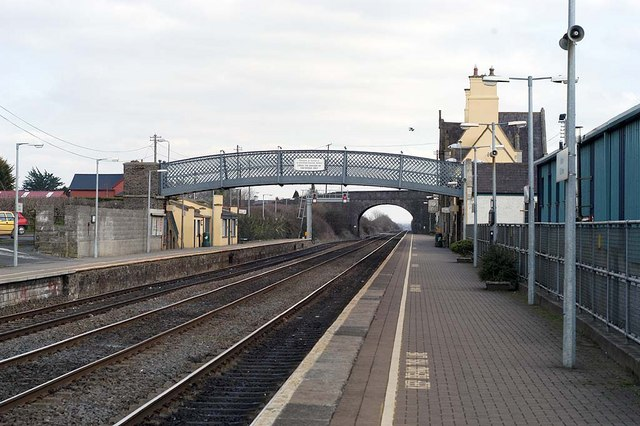
- Kildare railway station.

Overview
- Status: Operational
- Locale: Ireland
- Termini: Kildare; Waterford
- Stations: 7

Service
- Type: Inter-city rail, Heavy rail
- System: Iarnród Éireann
- Services: InterCity: Dublin–Waterford; Commuter: Dublin-Carlow
- Operator(s): Iarnród Éireann
- Rolling stock: 22000 Class; 071 Class

History
- Opened: 1844

Technical
- Line length: 119 kilometres (74 mi); Kilkenny spur: 3.822 kilometres (2.375 mi)
- Number of tracks: Single track
- Character: Primary
- Track gauge: 1,600 mm (5 ft 3 in) Irish gauge
- Operating speed: 160 kilometres per hour (100 mph) (Cherryville–Kilkenny); 130 kilometres per hour (80 mph) (Kilkenny–Waterford)

The Dublin-Waterford line is a railway line in Ireland connecting Dublin with the major port of Waterford City in County Waterford. The line is part of the significant network of InterCity routes connected to the Dublin-Cork Main Line from Dublin Heuston. The line was constructed by the Great Southern and Western Railway. At Cherryville Junction, County Kildare the line splits from the Cork line. Both passenger and freight services run on the line. InterCity passenger services are operated by the 22000 Class DMUs. Kilkenny is located on a short spur off the line; freight trains use the Lavistown loop line to avoid reversal there.

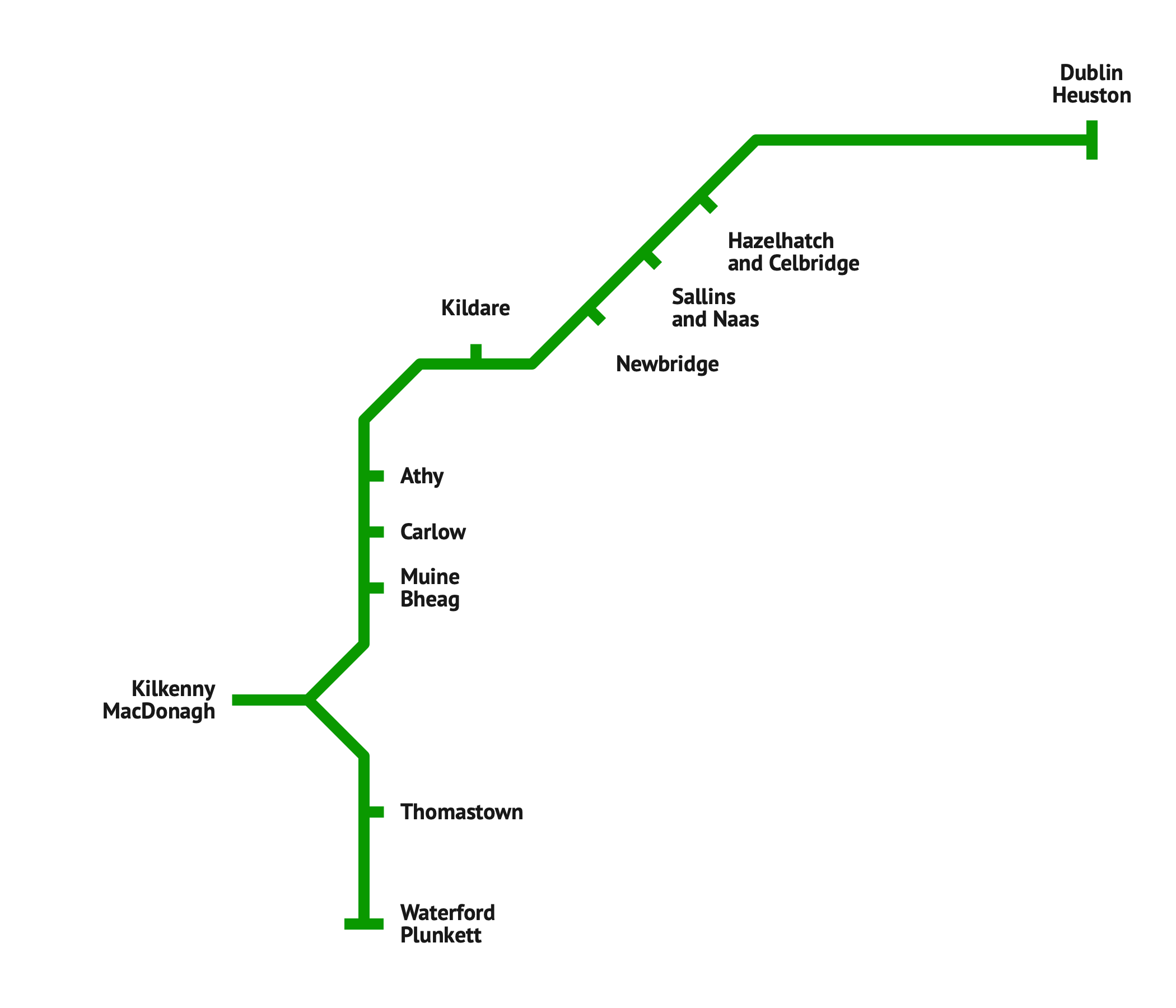
A non-geographical diagram of the Dublin - Waterford line.

== Services ==
- Monday-Thursday

7 trains in each direction Dublin to Waterford 2 trains Carlow to Dublin 1 train Dublin to Carlow

- Friday

8 trains in each direction Dublin to Waterford 1 train Dublin to Carlow 2 trains Carlow to Dublin

- Saturday

7 trains Dublin-Waterford 8 trains Waterford-Dublin

- Sunday

4 trains in each direction Dublin to Waterford The journey times range from 1h 55min to 2h 20min Dublin to Waterford and 1h 48min to 2h 16min Waterford to Dublin.
