= Heuston station =

Railway terminal in Dublin, Ireland

Dublin Heuston Heuston
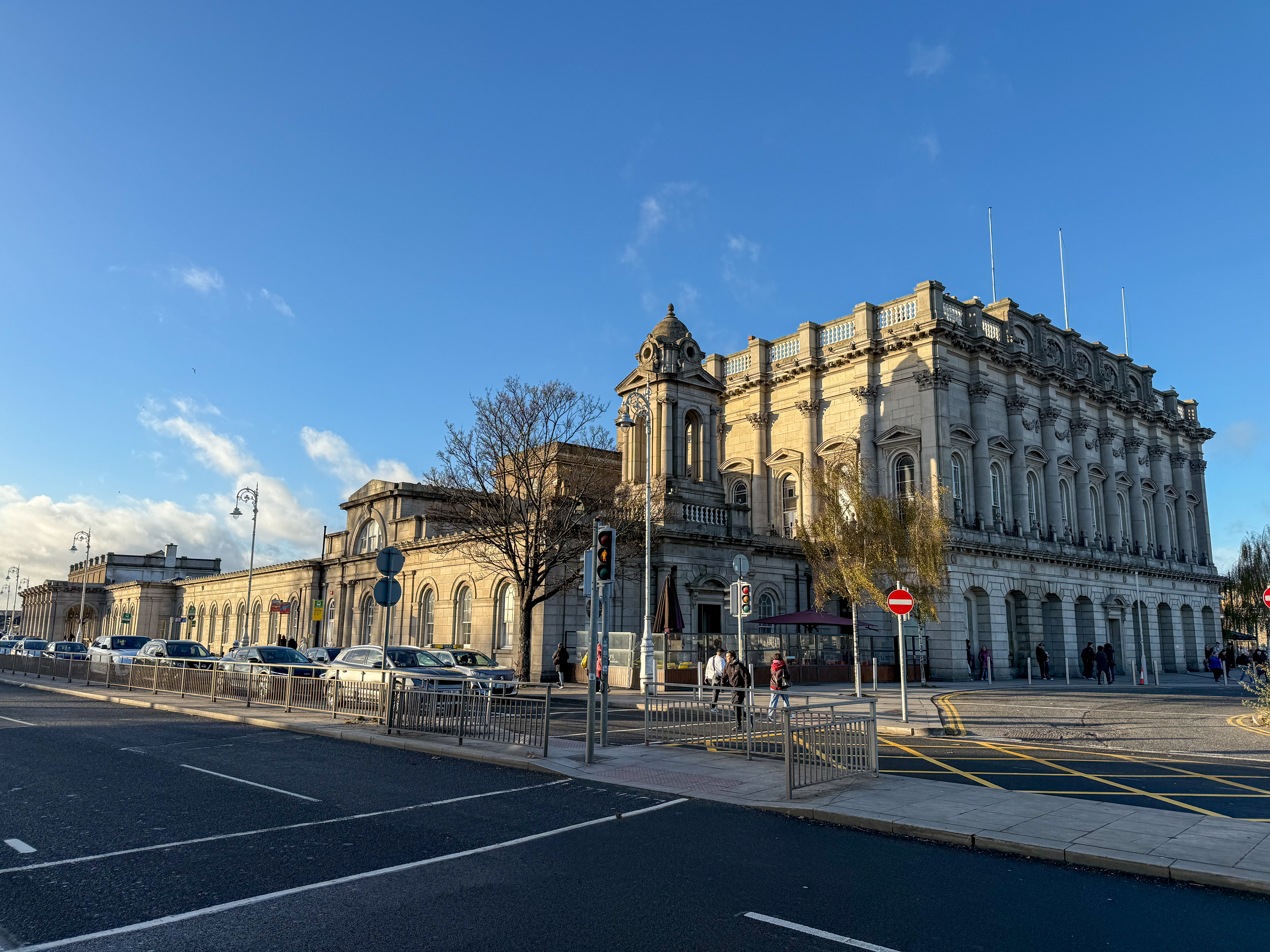
- The station in late 2025

General information
- Location: St John's Road West; Dublin 8, D08 E2CV; Ireland
- Coordinates: 53.3465°N 6.2925°W
- Owner: Iarnród Éireann
- Operator: Iarnród Éireann
- Line: Dublin–Cork line
- Platforms: 9
- Bus operators: Bus Eireann; Citylink; Dublin Bus; Dublin Express; Express Bus; Go-Ahead Ireland; JJ Kavanagh and Sons; Nolan Coaches
- Connections: 4; 22; 23; 51D; 52; 60; 69; 69X; 80; 99; 115; 115C; 115X; 120; 120A; 120B; 120E; 120F; 120X; 126; 126A; 126B; 126D; 126E; 126T; 126U; 126X; 130; 130A; 245X; 660; 707; 717; 735; 736; 761; 763; 782; 845; 847; 853; 860; C1; C2; C3; C4; C5; C6; GD02; N2; S2; P29; X25; X26; X27; X28; X30; X31; X32; Red Line

Construction
- Structure type: At-grade
- Parking: Yes
- Cycle facilities: Yes
- Accessible: Yes
- Architect: Sancton Wood (terminal); John MacNeill (train shed)

Other information
- Station code: HSTON, 1
- Fare zone: Suburban 1

History
- Opened: 4 August 1846; 180 years ago
- Former names: Kingsbridge Station
- Original company: Great Southern and Western Railway
- Pre-grouping: Great Southern and Western Railway
- Post-grouping: Great Southern Railways

Key dates
- 1846: Station opened as Kingsbridge Station
- 1966: Renamed as Heuston Station
- 1998, 2004 and 2005: Station refurbished and partially rebuilt

Passengers
- 2015: ▲19,750
- 2016: ▼19,544
- 2017: ▲22,296
- 2018: ▲23,165
- 2019: ▼22,836
Location
Notes
- Passenger numbers are for a single day of usage in the year mentioned, and are the sum of the year's boardings and alightings. Source

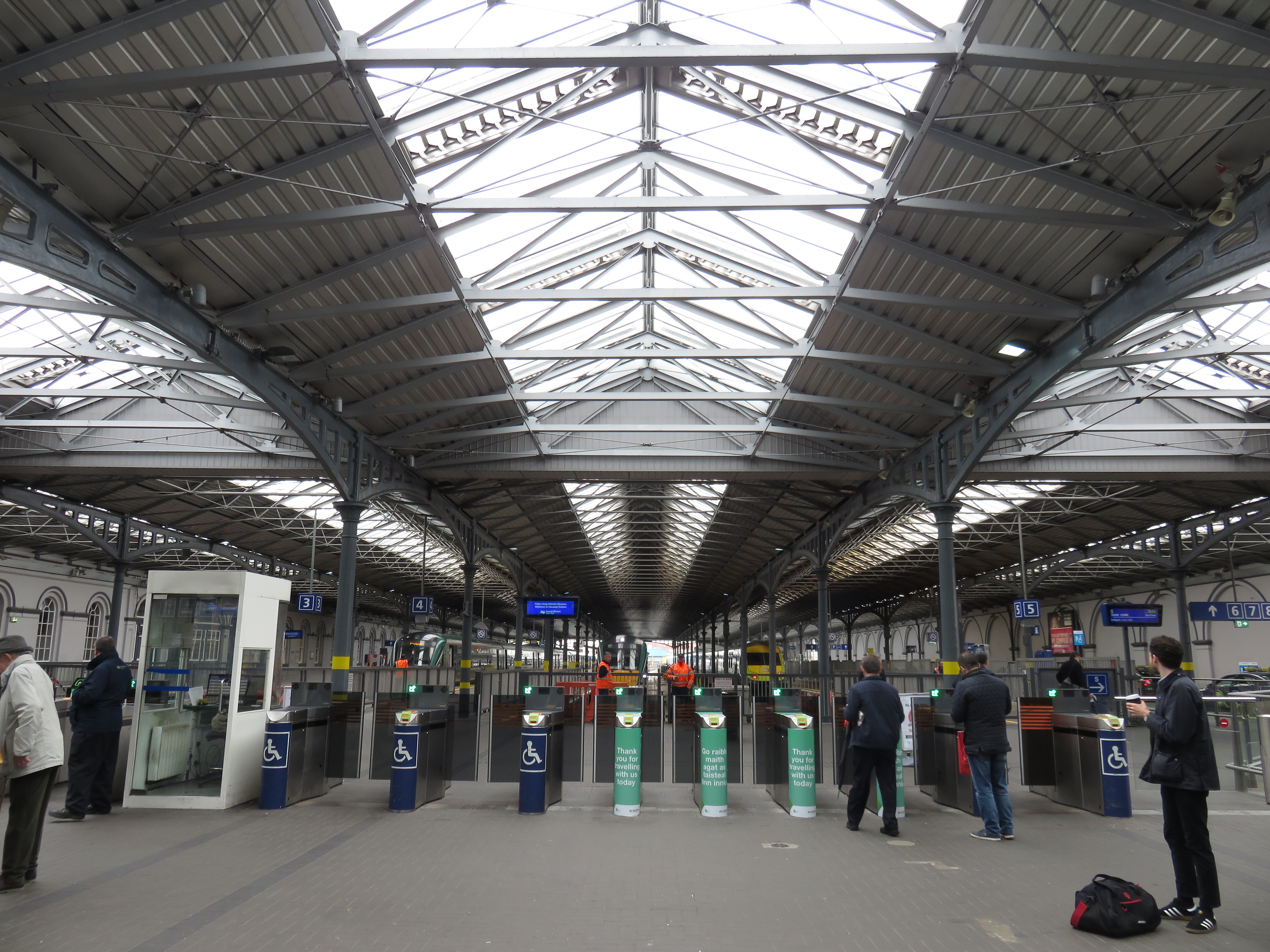
Interior of the station looking towards the track area in 2018

Heuston Station (/ˈhjuːstən/ HEW-stən; Irish: Stáisiún Heuston), also known as Dublin Heuston and formerly named Kingsbridge Station, is one of Dublin's largest railway stations and links the capital with the south, southwest and west of Ireland. It is operated by Iarnród Éireann (IÉ), the national railway operator. It also houses the head office of its parent company, Córas Iompair Éireann (CIÉ). The station is named in honour of Seán Heuston, an executed leader of the 1916 Easter Rising, who had worked in the station's offices.

== History ==
In 1836, a committee of Commissioners was appointed by the British Government to identify a system of rail routes throughout Ireland which would best serve the interests of the country as a whole. In their report of 1838, Kingsbridge, or 'King's Bridge', was selected as the optimum location for a terminus in Dublin which would most conveniently serve a main trunk railway line to the southern and western districts of Ireland. The site had been known as Kingsbridge since the completion of the nearby King's Bridge over the River Liffey in 1828.

The Great Southern and Western Railway (GS&WR) company was authorised by an Act passed in 1844 and began selecting a site in Dublin for their main city terminus, as well as the site of their headquarters. In a series of pamphlets, the promoters of a proposed rail link to Cashel, County Tipperary argued that Kingsbridge was the better choice for a Dublin terminus over a competing proposal for a Portobello terminus, due to it being conveniently located next to the quays, Smithfield cattle market, hay and straw markets, wool and butter cranes, woollen, cotton, iron and leather warehouses, the Linenhall area, as well as sites of strategic military importance such as the Royal Barracks.

The station with King's Bridge in the foreground c. 1900

An Incorporation Act entitled “An Act for Making and Maintaining a Railway from the City of Dublin to the Town of Cashel, with a Branch to the Town of Carlow" was passed and established in law. On 28 October 1845 the Great Southern and Western Railway Company bought a site in Dublin adjoining the Military Road, and another parcel of ground, from Henry John Temple, Lord Viscount Palmerston for £1,600. (Note: Registry of Deeds, Dublin. 1847-20-179. Registered 21/12/1847. A Memorial of an Indented Deed of Conveyance bearing date the Twenty eighth day of October in the year of our Lord one thousand eight hundred and forty five made between the Right Honorable (sic) Henry John Lord Viscount Palmerston of the Kingdom of Ireland of the one part and the Great Southern and Western Railway Company Ireland Incorporated by an Act of Parliament made and passed in the seventh and eighth years of the Reign of her present Majesty Queen Victoria intituled “An Act for making and maintaining a Railway from the city of Dublin to the Town of Cashel with a branch to the town of Carlow” of the other part Whereby the said Henry John Lord Viscount Palmerston in consideration of the sum of one thousand six hundred pounds paid to him by the said Great Southern and Western Railway Company the receipt of whereof was thereby acknowledged did convey, grant and release to the said Company, their successors and assigns All That or those the pieces or portions of land adjoining the Military Road situate in the Parish of Saint James in the City of Dublin and also All That and those the pieces or parcels of ground situate in the said Parish of Saint James and County of Dublin containing in the whole one acre and twenty two perches Irish plantation measure…) In December 1845, the GS&WR began advertising for tenders for building the Kingsbridge railway terminus on the land they had recently bought.

The station opened on 4 August 1846 as the terminus and headquarters of the Great Southern and Western Railway with the Freeman's Journal describing how "carriages of all classes were densely crowded with passengers, thus giving early evidence of the vast traffic which is likely to accrue on the line when in full and perfect operation". The first regular passenger train service from the station commenced later that month with the running of two trains each way daily between Dublin and Carlow (Carlow-bound trains departed Dublin at 9am and 5pm). Trains were scheduled to take about 2hr 35min for the 56 mi (90 km) stretch to Carlow from where conventional mail coach connections could carry passengers onwards to Kilkenny, Clonmel, Waterford or Cork.

The passenger terminal and buildings were built to designs by London-born architect Sancton Wood, and the train sheds and infrastructure were designed by Irish-born railway engineer John MacNeill. Regarding the architectural merits of the passenger terminal, historian Maurice Craig described it thus: "a delightful building, a renaissance palazzo, gay and full-blooded, with fruity swags and little domed towers on the wings, a thoroughgoing formal composition, excellently articulated".

When first constructed the station had only two platforms separated by five carriage lines. Two of the lines were subsequently replaced by a two-sided platform and the remaining carriage line also removed. An additional platform, created in 1872 on the south side of the station, beyond the station roof, was known as the "military platform" – the intention being that military personnel could be kept separate from the rest of the public. Due to the need to cater for increased demand and reduce delays, three new platforms were incorporated in August 2002 as part of a €170,000,000 development incorporating improved signalling and approach track-work.

In 1966, on the 50th anniversary of the Easter Rising, it was renamed "Heuston Station" in honour of Seán Heuston, a young railway worker who commanded a nearby post in the 1916 Easter Rising. Heuston was one of the 16 executed by the British after that Rising, and had previously worked in the station's offices.

Since the station's refurbishment and modernisation (by Quinn Savage Smyth architects and engineers Buro Happold) its retail facilities now include a branch of Easons, as well as some dining facilities, including a branch of Supermacs, several cafés, a kiosk, and a large pub.

A maintenance depot at the Inchicore railway works is located approximately three kilometres (two miles) away and, as with Heuston Station itself, was also opened in 1846.

== Operation ==
Based on 2019 National Transport Authority figures for "boardings and alightings", Heuston was then the third busiest station in Ireland, behind Connolly Station and Pearse stations, also in Dublin. All services leave the station on a triple line as far as Inchicore, quadruple line until Hazelhatch, and thereafter only double line (one each way).

=== Rail services ===
The following services depart Heuston on weekdays:

- 1 train per hour (tph) to Cork Kent
- 7 trains per day (tpd) to Waterford Plunkett
- 1 tp2h to Galway Ceannt
- 3 tpd to Westport
- 1 tph to Limerick Colbert (peak times only)
- 1 tpd to Tralee Casement
- 1 tph to Portlaoise
- 2 tpd to Carlow
- 1 tpd to Athlone

Heuston is the terminus for the mainline to Cork, and there are key service and transfer points in the Cork-bound direction at:

- Kildare (for stations on the Waterford line)
- Portarlington (for routes to the west via Tullamore and Athlone)
- Portlaoise (end of commuter services from Heuston)
- Ballybrophy (junction for stations on the Limerick-Ballybrophy railway line),
- Limerick Junction (for transfer to Limerick and Ennis services, and Waterford via Clonmel)
- Mallow (junction for Killarney and Tralee, and the start of Cork commuter services).

Preceding station	Iarnród Éireann	Following station
Terminus	InterCity; Dublin-Cork	Portlaoise or Thurles
Terminus	InterCity; Dublin-Waterford railway line	Hazelhatch and Celbridge or Newbridge
Terminus	InterCity; Dublin–Westport/Galway railway line	Sallins and Naas or Portarlington
Terminus	InterCity; Ballina branch line	Portarlington
Terminus	InterCity; Mallow–Tralee line	Ballybrophy
Terminus	Commuter; South Western Commuter	Park West & Cherry Orchard

=== Links to other main railway stations ===
Before 2016, the physical rail link between Connolly Station and Heuston via the Phoenix Park Tunnel was usually only used for freight and rolling stock movements. Once or twice a year special trains operated, usually from Cork to Connolly for Gaelic Athletic Association matches at Croke Park. A more regular service along this route began on 21 November 2016.

The Luas light rail red line connects the two stations (apart from off-peak Saturdays, Sundays and bank holidays). Dublin Express has a direct service to Dublin Airport.

=== Platforms ===
There are nine platforms: eight terminal platforms and one through platform. Platform 1 is an extension to Platform 2, and is reachable only via that platform. Prior to Heuston's 2002–2004 upgrade, there were five terminal platforms.

The through platform is numbered Platform 10 and is situated on the Phoenix Park Tunnel line, which connects to Connolly Station. There is no platform nine. Platform 10 is some distance from the main concourse and is not used for any regularly scheduled trains.

== Proposed developments ==
A 2018 consultation paper for the proposed Dublin MetroLink project included a reference to a potential future station, labelled "Heuston West", with connections via the Phoenix Park Tunnel to Cabra.

Other plans, first published in the 1970s, suggested that a proposed DART Underground project would link underground stations at Heuston and Pearse station via a tunnel. As of 2015, these plans were subject to review, and as of mid-2018, the DART Underground project was not funded.

== Heuston Luas stop ==
Heuston
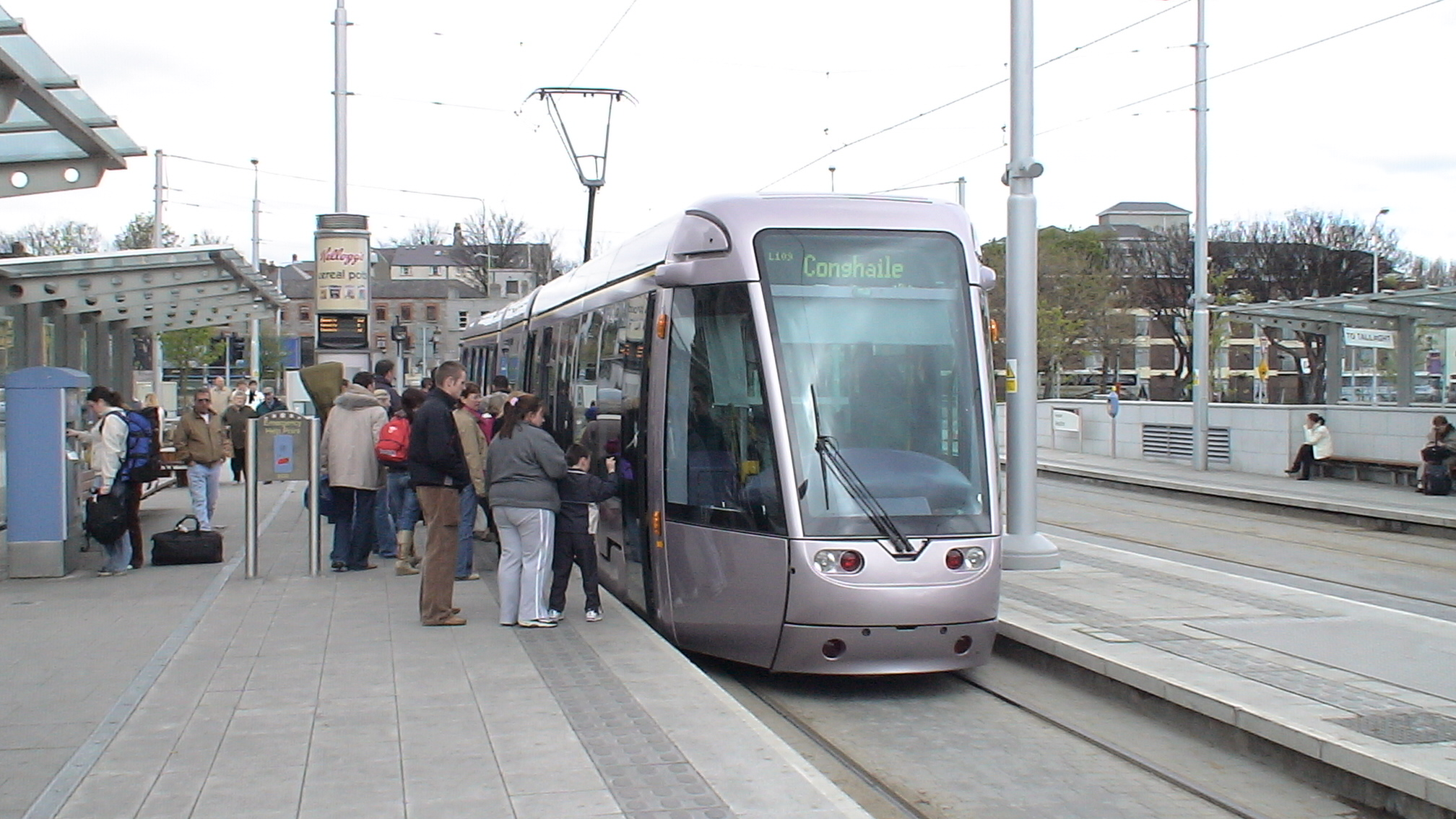
- A tram at Heuston in 2005

General information
- Location: Dublin; Ireland
- Coordinates: 53°20′48″N 6°17′30″W
- Owner: Transport Infrastructure Ireland
- Operator: Luas
- Line: Red
- Platforms: 3

Construction
- Structure type: At-grade

Other information
- Fare zone: Central/Red 2

Key dates
- 26 September 2004: Station opened

Services
Preceding station	Luas	Following station
James's towards Saggart or Tallaght	Red Line	Museum towards The Point or Connolly
Location
- Location within Central Dublin

Heuston is an interchange with Dublin's Luas light rail tram system. Opened in 2004, Heuston Luas stop is located in front of the station building; the tram tracks run perpendicular to the main line tracks. To the north of the stop, trams cross the River Liffey on the Seán Heuston Bridge, which was refurbished as part of the Luas construction. To the south, trams travel up Steeven's Lane, which is closed to road vehicles other than those accessing St. Patrick's University Hospital.

Heuston has three platforms. There are two outer edge platforms and two sides of an island platform. The two platforms nearest the station serve the same section of track, used for northbound trams travelling towards Connolly or The Point. The platform nearest St. John's Road West is for southbound trams travelling towards Tallaght and Saggart. The eastern side of the island is a terminus platform, used only in certain peak times, when extra services are run in the city centre section.

== In culture ==
Exterior shots of the station appeared in the 1978 heist film The First Great Train Robbery purporting to be London Bridge railway station. The station was altered to represent the Victorian era including the erection of offices, signs, posters and horse-drawn transport.

== Gallery ==
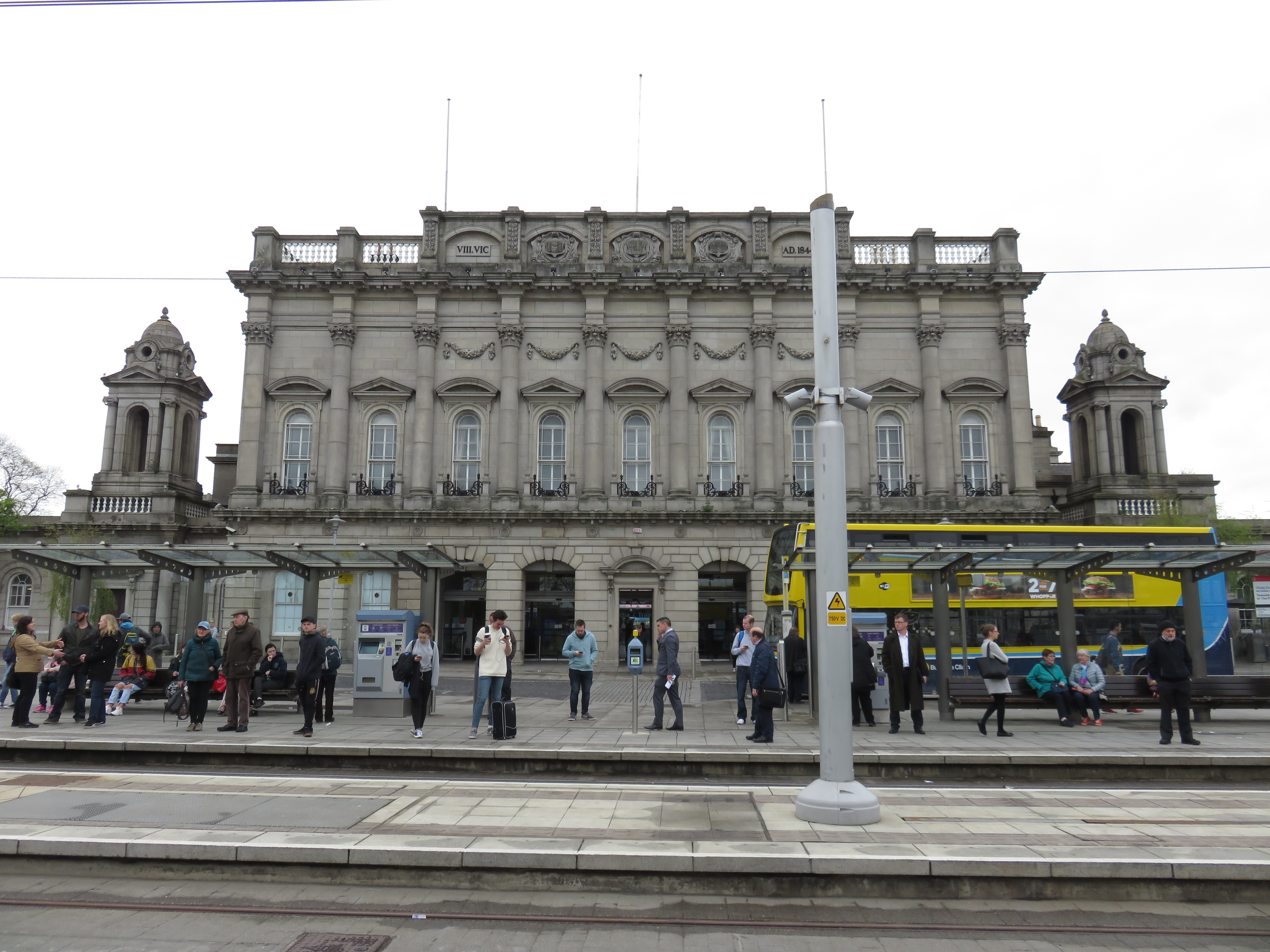
Facade in 2018

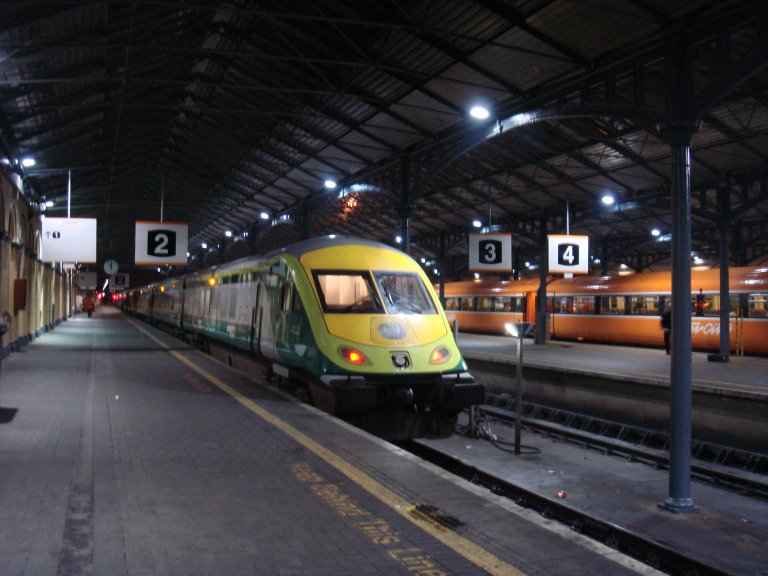
Cork-Dublin train at Heuston

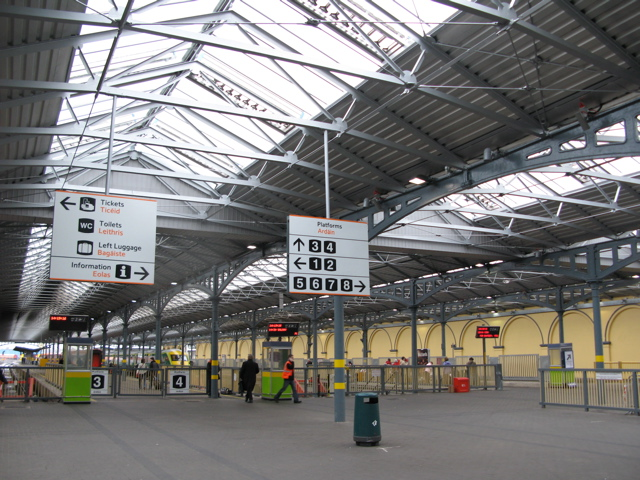
Renovated roof

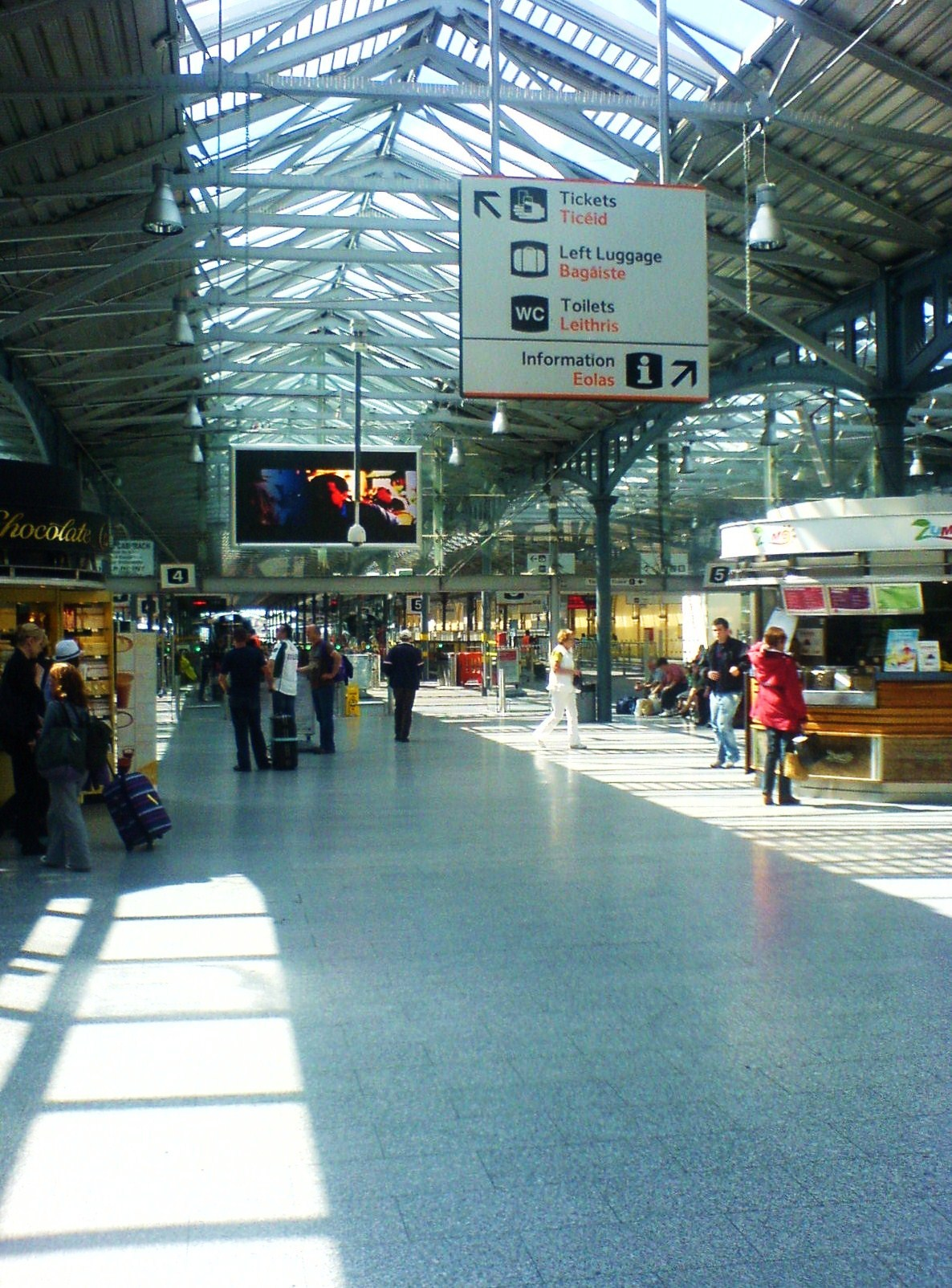
Heuston interior

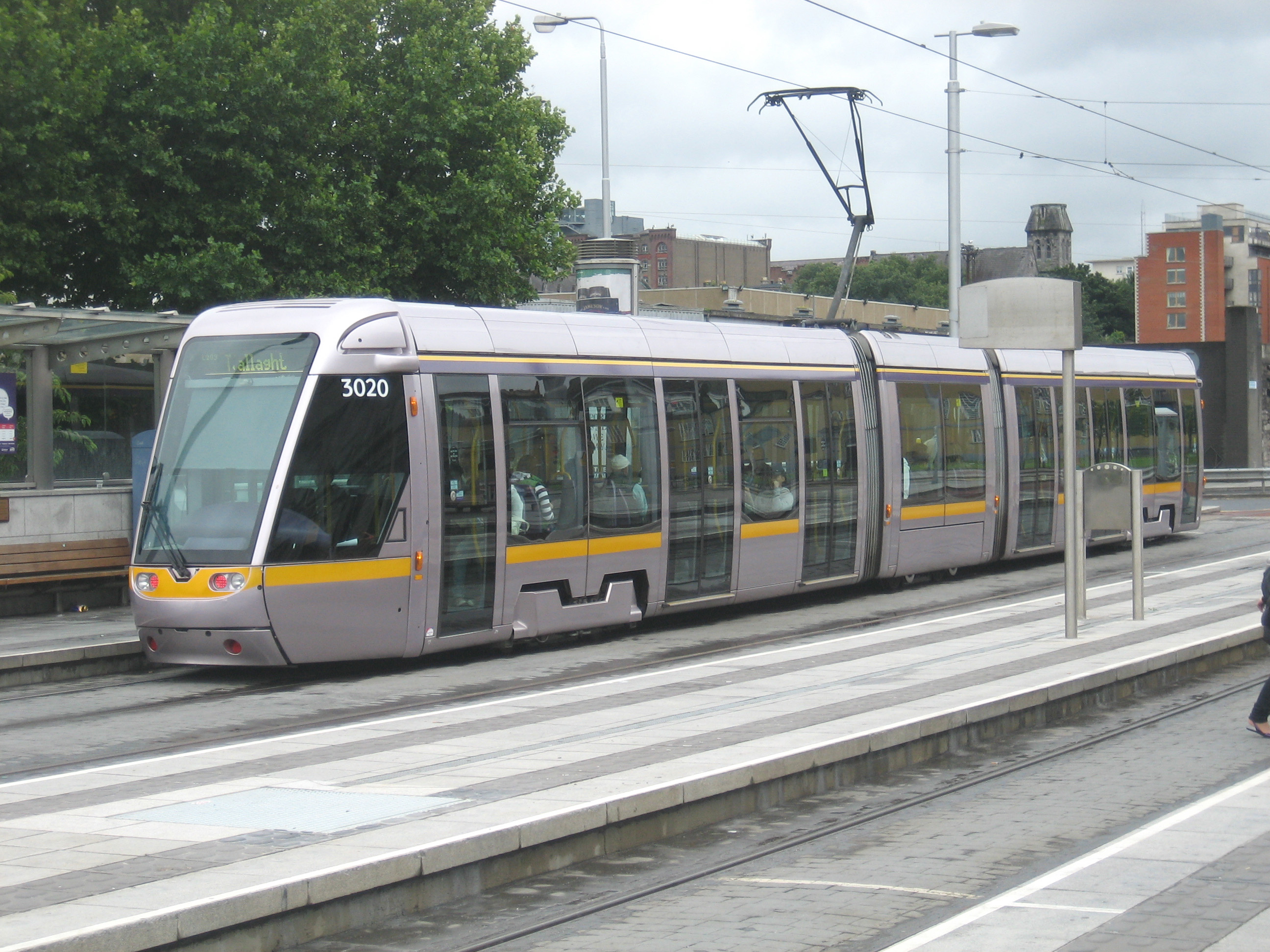
Luas at Heuston

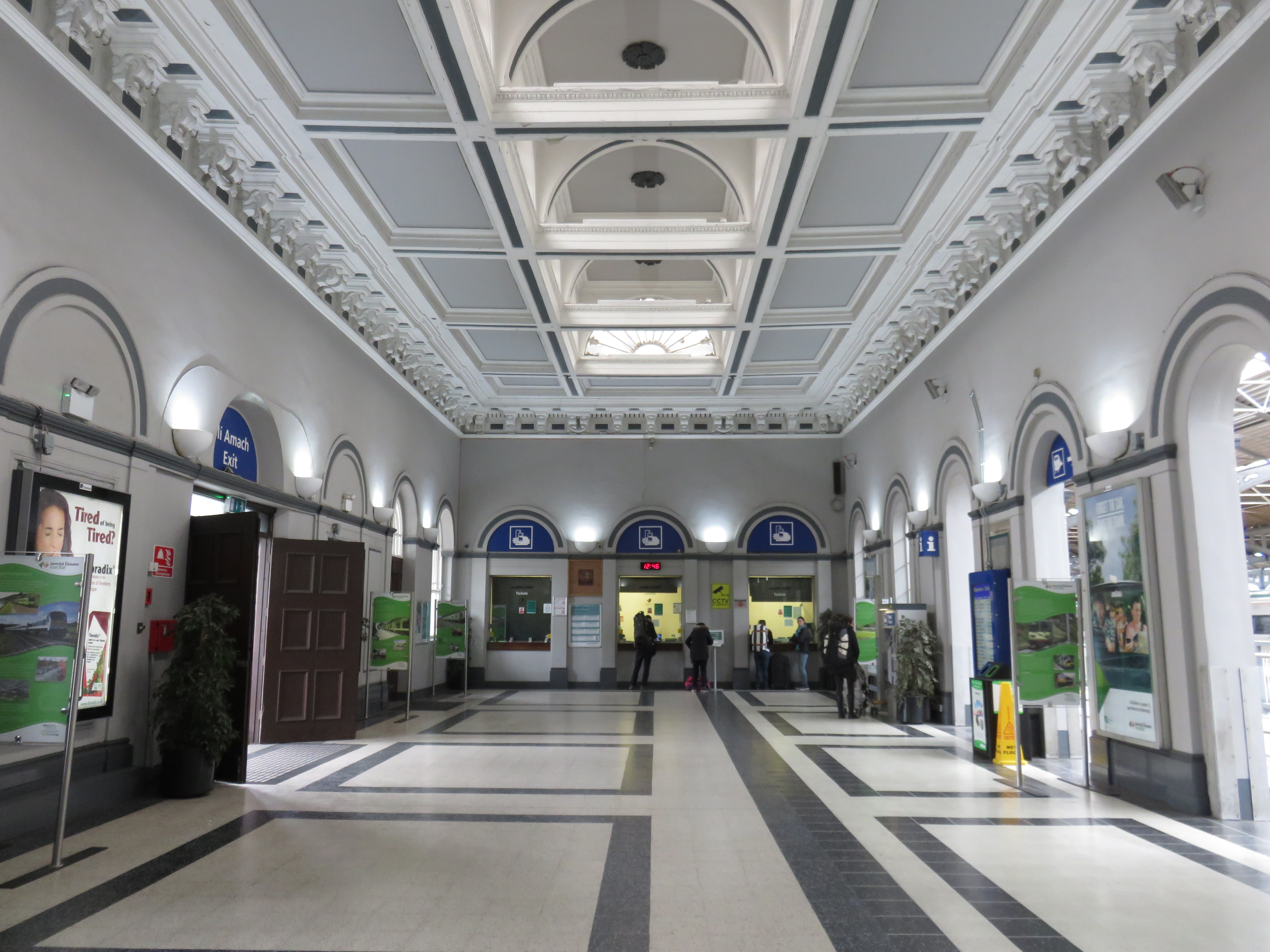
Ticketing area in 2018

== See also ==
- List of railway stations in Ireland
- History of rail transport in Ireland

== Sources ==
- Craig, Maurice (1952). Dublin 1660-1860: The Shaping of a City. Dublin: Liberties Press. ISBN 978-1905483112.
- Murray, K.A.; McNeill, D.B. (1976). Great Southern & Western Railway. Dublin: Irish Railway Record Society. ISBN 0-904078-05-1.
