= Waterford Plunkett railway station =

Station in Waterford City, Ireland

Waterford Plunkett Stáisiún Phluincéid
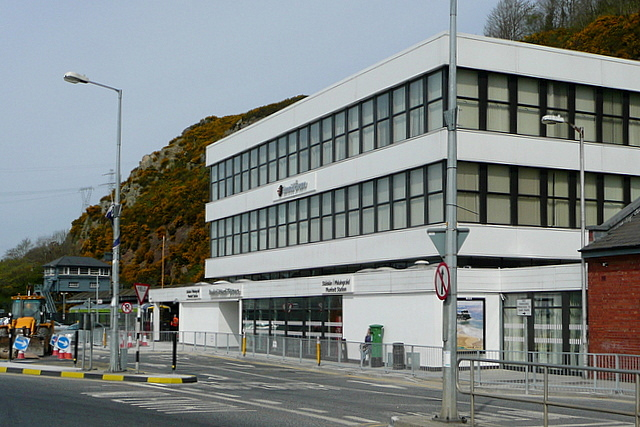
- Waterford Plunkett railway station

General information
- Location: Terminus Street, Waterford; County Waterford, X91 A2PV; Ireland
- Coordinates: 52.266°N 7.117°W
- Owner: Iarnród Éireann
- Operator: Iarnród Éireann
- Platforms: 3

Construction
- Structure type: At-grade

Other information
- Station code: WFORD
- Fare zone: N

History
- Opened: 26 August 1864
Location

Waterford railway station (Plunkett Station, Irish: Stáisiún Phluincéid) is a railway station which serves the city of Waterford in County Waterford, Ireland. The station is located across Rice Bridge on the north side of the city.

Only one platform, the bay platform 5 remains in service. The former main through platforms 3/4 is now used only for access to Belview port and the tracks have been removed from platform 6. A large signal cabin is situated across the running lines. The station area is still currently controlled by semaphore signals.

== Services ==
The station is a significant interchange. It is the terminus for InterCity services from Dublin Heuston and InterCity services from Limerick Junction. Travel to Limerick Junction provides onward connections to Cork, Killarney, Tralee, Limerick, Ennis, Athenry and Galway.

There are seven daily trains in each direction between Waterford - Dublin Mondays to Saturdays inclusive. One extra Dublin to Waterford train runs Friday only and one extra Waterford to Dublin train runs Friday and Saturday only. On Sundays there are four trains each way. The fastest of these trains being the 07.10 Waterford - Dublin which completes the journey in exactly 1 hour and 48 minutes.

There are two trains each way between Waterford - Limerick Junction Mondays to Saturdays inclusive. There is no Sunday service on this line. Until 19 January 2013 (inclusive) there were three trains each way. However, the late-morning Waterford to Limerick Junction and early-afternoon Limerick Junction to Waterford trains are now discontinued.

Preceding station	Iarnród Éireann	Following station
Thomastown	InterCity; Dublin-Waterford railway line	Terminus
Carrick-on-Suir	InterCity; Limerick-Rosslare railway line	Terminus
	Disused railways	
Carrick on Suir	InterCity; Limerick Junction-Waterford	Campile
Grange	Great Southern and Western Railway; Limerick-Rosslare railway line	Campile

=== Rail replacement bus to Rosslare Europort ===
Until 18 September 2010 (inclusive), there was one daily return train between Waterford and Rosslare, after which time passenger trains on the line were suspended. The rail service was replaced by a revised Bus Éireann Route 370 service from 20 September 2010. However, the replacement bus service does not serve the railway station, the nearest stop being the bus station a walk of several minutes. In 2021, the transport minister Eamon Ryan said the government were reviewing the line with a possibility of re-opening it.

== Facilities ==
The station has a booking office, ticket vending machines, shop, waiting areas, toilets and a car park.

== Freight ==
The station is directly rail connected to Waterford Port (Belview). A freight yard is located at the Dublin/Limerick end of the station, served by freight traffics such as cement and timber which travel to and from Dublin Port and Ballina.

== History ==
The earliest station on the North bank of the River Suir in Waterford was the Dunkitt station, built in 1854 about 2 km away from the current site. This was very shortly moved to Sally Park, and service was available to Limerick via the Waterford Limerick Railway and to Kilkenny via the Waterford Kilkenny Railway.

The predecessor to the current station opened on 26 August 1864 as Waterford North. The original station building was located close to the site of the current station.

Service to Dublin first commenced on February 15, 1904 when the station was connected to the Dublin, Wicklow and Wexford railway. In 1906, the Red Iron Bridge was constructed, enabling a service to Rosslare to commence.

The original station was demolished and replaced by the current station building in 1966. Upon reopening, it was renamed Plunkett on 10 April 1966 in commemoration of Joseph Plunkett, one of the executed leaders of the Easter Rising of 1916.

In 1878, a second station, known as Waterford South was opened across the river. This station operated until 1908, when it was shut and all services moved to Waterford North. Waterford South was briefly reopened in 1935 to service the Waterford Stanley plant.

== Future Development ==
As part of the Waterford North Quay SDZ Scheme the present station will be closed and a new station opened on the North Quays. The new station will be part of a "Transport Hub" with bus station and other transport infrastructure. A new sustainable transport bridge (bus, cycle and pedestrian bridge) will link the transport hub to the other side of river/Waterford city centre.

Trains to Waterford are currently limited to 6 coaches due to the shortening of Kilkenny MacDonagh station in 1997, as all trains to Waterford pass through this station. Iarnród Éireann have stated they would like to enable longer trains to pass through Kilkenny station, but have no current timeline on when such a project could be funded.

== Statistics ==
Year	Daily Passenger Exit and Entry	Change
2012	937	NA
2013	482	▼455
2014	990	▲508
2015	868	▼122
2016	867	▼1

== Gallery ==
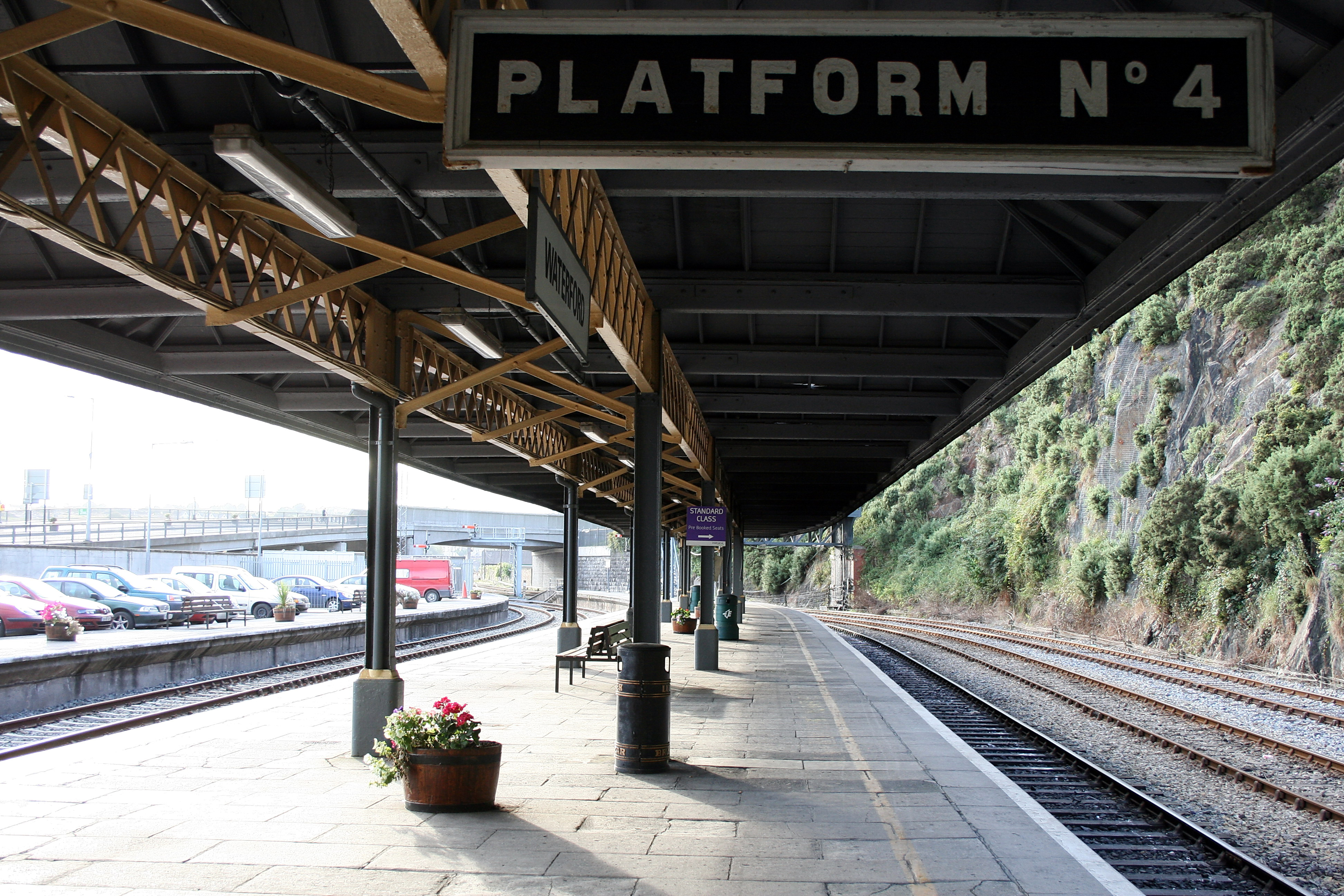
Looking west

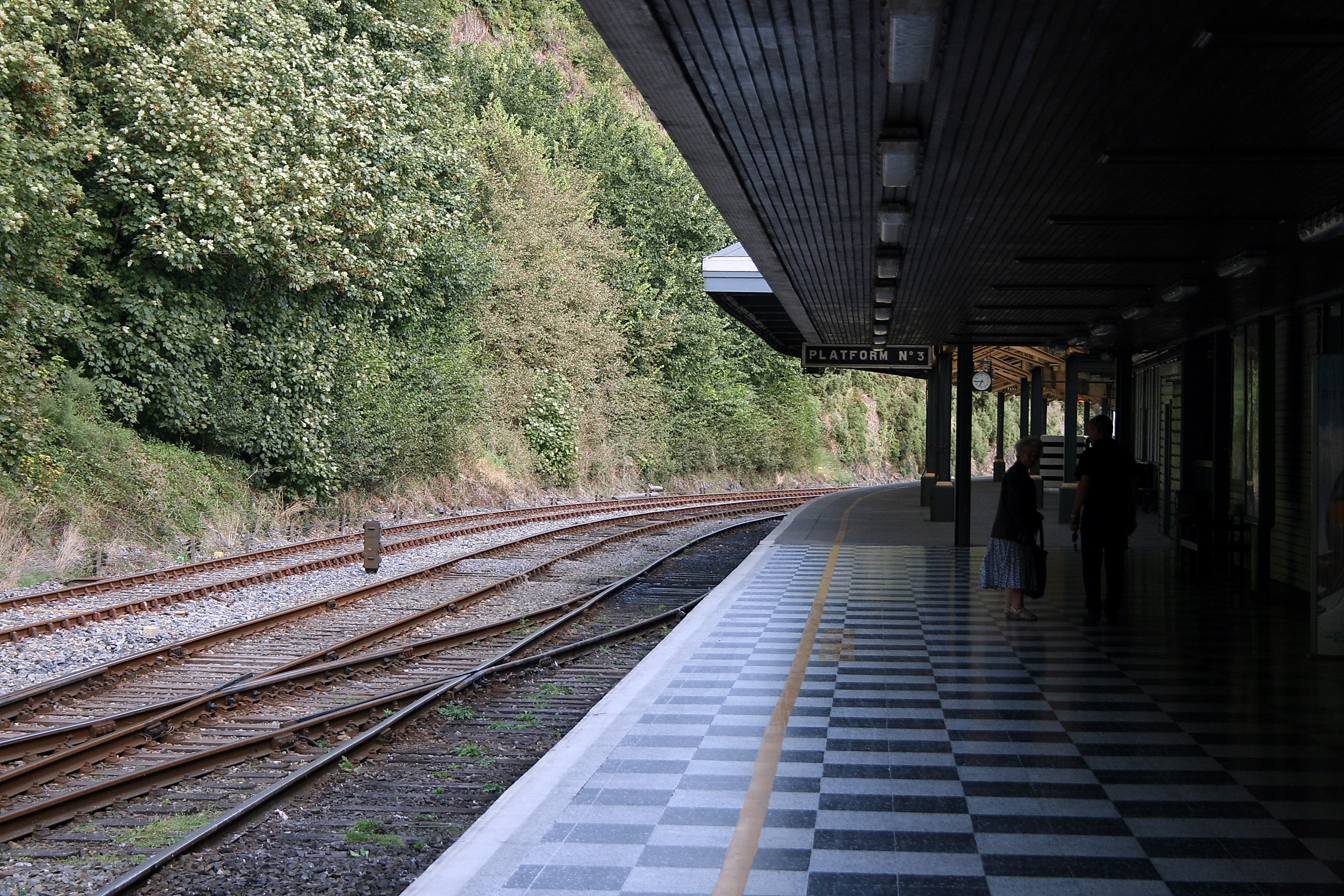
Looking east

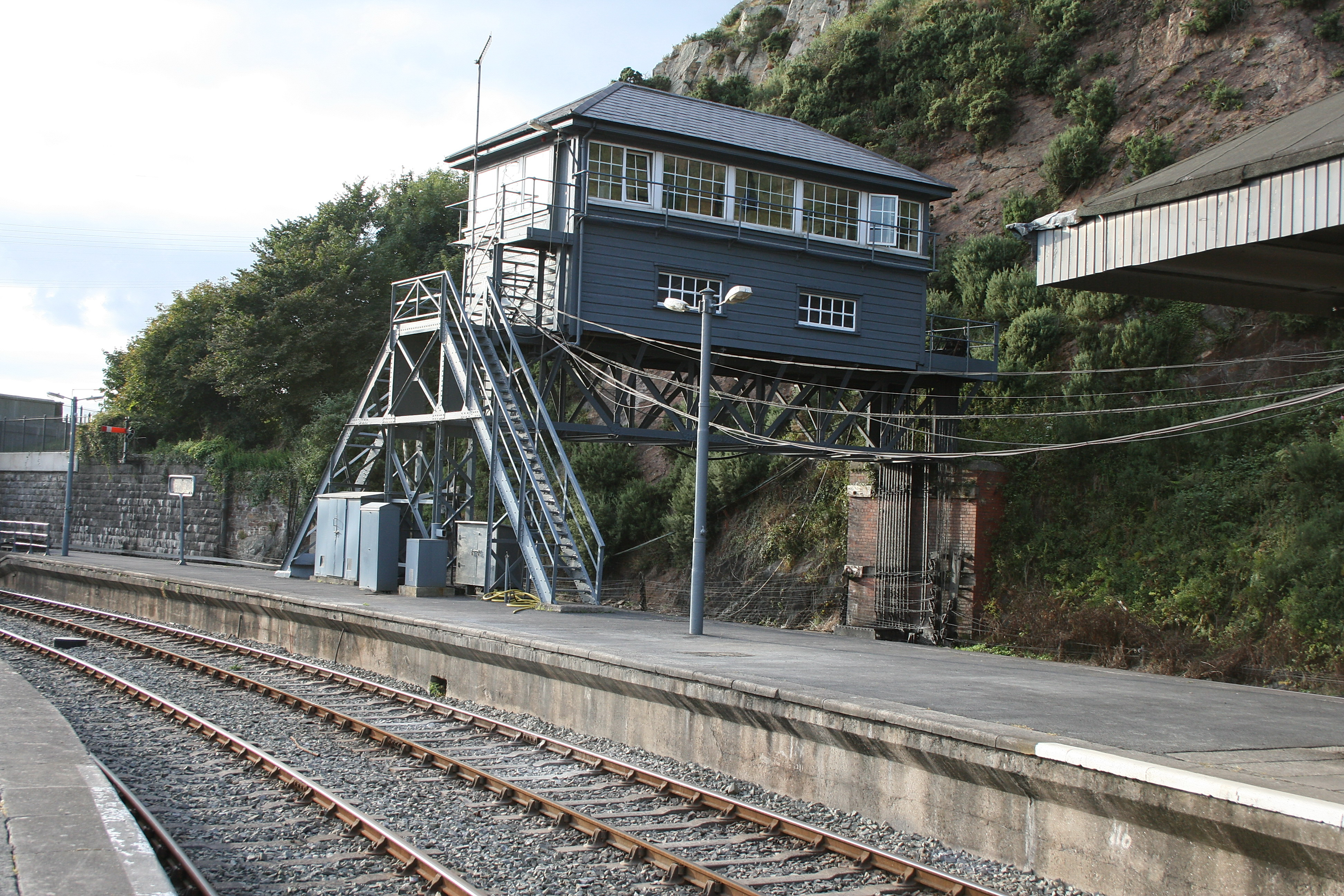
The signal cabin

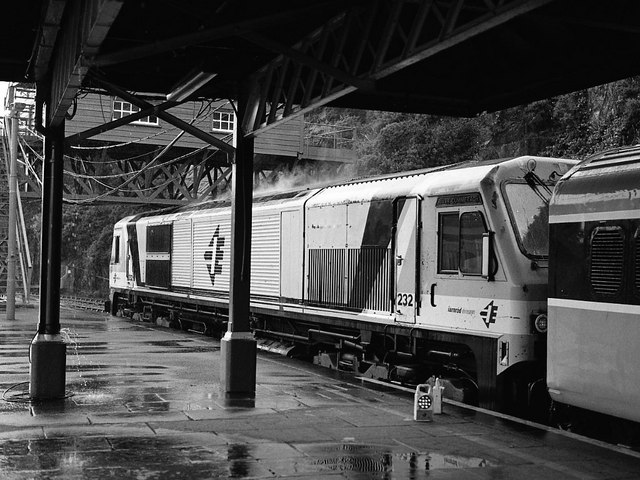
Loco-hauled in 2007 now replaced by IE 22000 Class

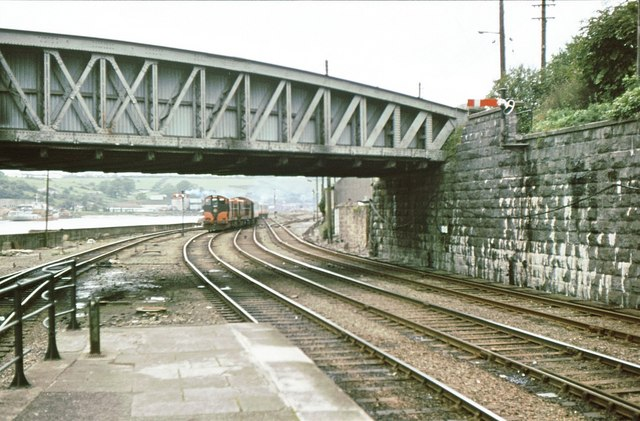
In 1983 with a terminating train from Dublin Heuston hauled by a pair of CIE 121 Class locomotives

== See also ==
- List of railway stations in Ireland
