= Sea Point (disambiguation) =

Sea Point can refer to:

- Sea Point, Cape Town, Cape Town
  - Sea Point High School
- Seapoint, Blackrock and Monkstown in Dublin, Ireland
  - Seapoint railway station
- Sea Point (EP), an EP by Mark Templeton
