= Inland (Mark Templeton album) =

Studio album by Mark Templeton
- Released: May 11, 2009
- Genre: Ambient, electronic
- Length: 43:44
- Label: Anticipate Recordings

Mark Templeton chronology
Acre Loss CD+DVD (2009)	Inland (2009)	Sea Point 12"Vinyl (2009)

Professional ratings
Review scores
Source	Rating
AllMusic	link
Boomkat	link
Dusted Magazine	link
Exclaim!	link
Forest Gospel	link
Foxy Digitalis	link
Mapsadaisical	link

Inland follows up Standing on a Hummingbird as Mark Templeton's second full-length solo album. Inland was released May 11, 2009, by the electronic music label Anticipate Recordings, hailing out of New York City.

== Track listing ==
1. "At Your Feet" – 3:52
2. "Oak" – 4:12
3. "Their Light Reflected" – 4:06
4. "Please Take Me" - 4:13
5. "Sleep In Front Of" – 5:16
6. "West Of Fabric pt. 1" – 4:36
7. "West Of Fabric pt. 2" – 1:15
8. "Under" – 3:51
9. "Even You Can Tell" – 2:46
10. "Seam" – 5:32
11. "Beginnings" – 3:05
