= Surfaces of a Broken Marching Band =

Studio album by Ezekiel Honig
- Released: October 2008
- Genre: Ambient, IDM, experimental
- Length: 44:48
- Label: Anticipate Recordings
- Producer: Ezekiel Honig

Ezekiel Honig chronology
Scattered Practices (2006)	Surfaces of a Broken Marching Band (2008)

Professional ratings
Review scores
Source	Rating
AllMusic	3.5/5 stars
Cyclic Defrost	Extremely favorable
Resident Advisor	4.5/5
XLR8R	7.5/10

Surfaces of a Broken Marching Band is Ezekiel Honig's fifth album, released October 27, 2008 by Anticipate Recordings.

== Reception ==
Critical reception of the album was very positive. Resident Advisor—an online magazine with a focus on electronic music—named Surfaces of a Broken Marching Band as the 13th best album of 2008. In their review of the album, RA reviewer Derek Miller give it a rating of 4.5 out of 5 and stated that "there hasn't been a better 'ambient' album this year." Alexandra Savvides of Cyclic Defrost had strong praise for the album, ending her review with "nothing can come close to describing just how amazing this release really is."

== Track listing ==
1. "Porchside Prologue" – 1:19
2. "Broken Marching Band" – 5:04
3. "A Brief Visual Pattern" – 5:06
4. "Seaside Pastures part 2" – 5:57
5. "Displacement" – 3:35
6. "Porchside Economics" – 5:29
7. "Material Instrument 1" – 5:27
8. "Material Instrument 2" – 4:25
9. "Past Tense Kitchen Movement" – 4:40
10. "Epilogue" – 3:29

== Personnel ==
- Craig Colorusso – guitar on track 9
- Thomas Hildebrand – field recordings on track 2
- Mark Templeton – guitar on tracks 1,6,9
- Twerk – mastering

== Porchside Past Tense ==
A single, entitled Porchside Past Tense, consisting of two tracks from the album, was released on 7" vinyl in limited quantities on December 14, 2008, by Anticipate Recordings out of New York City.

=== Track listing ===
A. "Porchside Economics" – 5:33
B. "Past Tense Kitchen Movement" – 4:40
