= Salthill and Monkstown railway station =

Railway station in Dublin, Ireland

Salthill and Monkstown Cnoc an tSalainn agus Baile na Manach
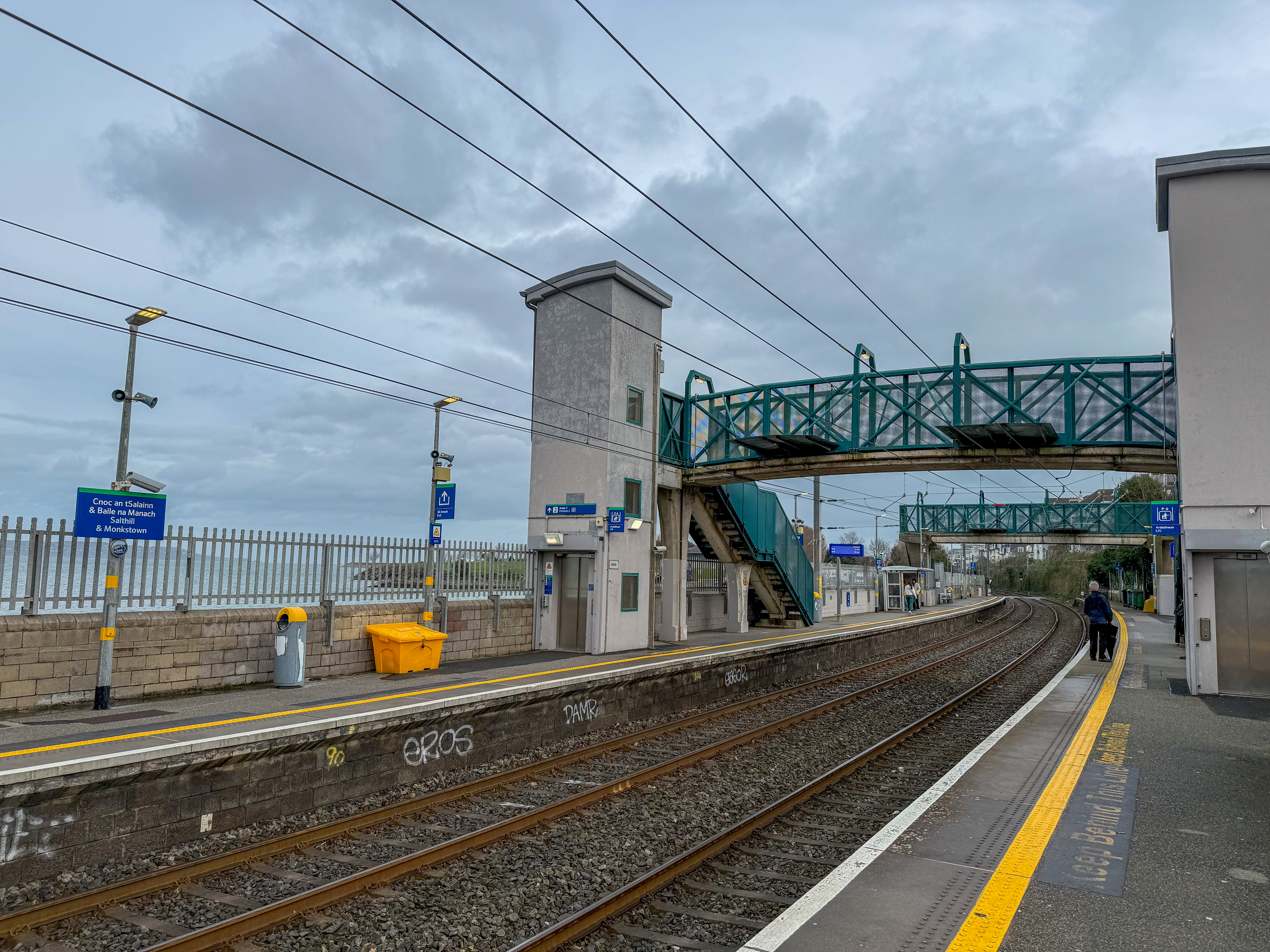
- The station in 2026

General information
- Location: Longford Terrace, Monkstown; County Dublin, A94 YY26; Ireland
- Coordinates: 53.2953°N 6.1522°W
- Owner: Iarnród Éireann
- Operator: Iarnród Éireann
- Platforms: 2

Construction
- Structure type: At-grade
- Platform levels: 2
- Accessible: Yes

Other information
- Station code: SHILL
- Fare zone: Suburban 2

History
- Opened: 1 May 1837 (as Salthill)
- Original company: Dublin and Kingstown Railway
- Pre-grouping: Dublin and South Eastern Railway
- Post-grouping: Great Southern Railways

Key dates
- 1863: Station renamed Salthill and Monkstown
- 1960: Station closed
- 1983: Station upgraded
- 1984: Station reopened for DART
- 2009: Station refurbished
Location

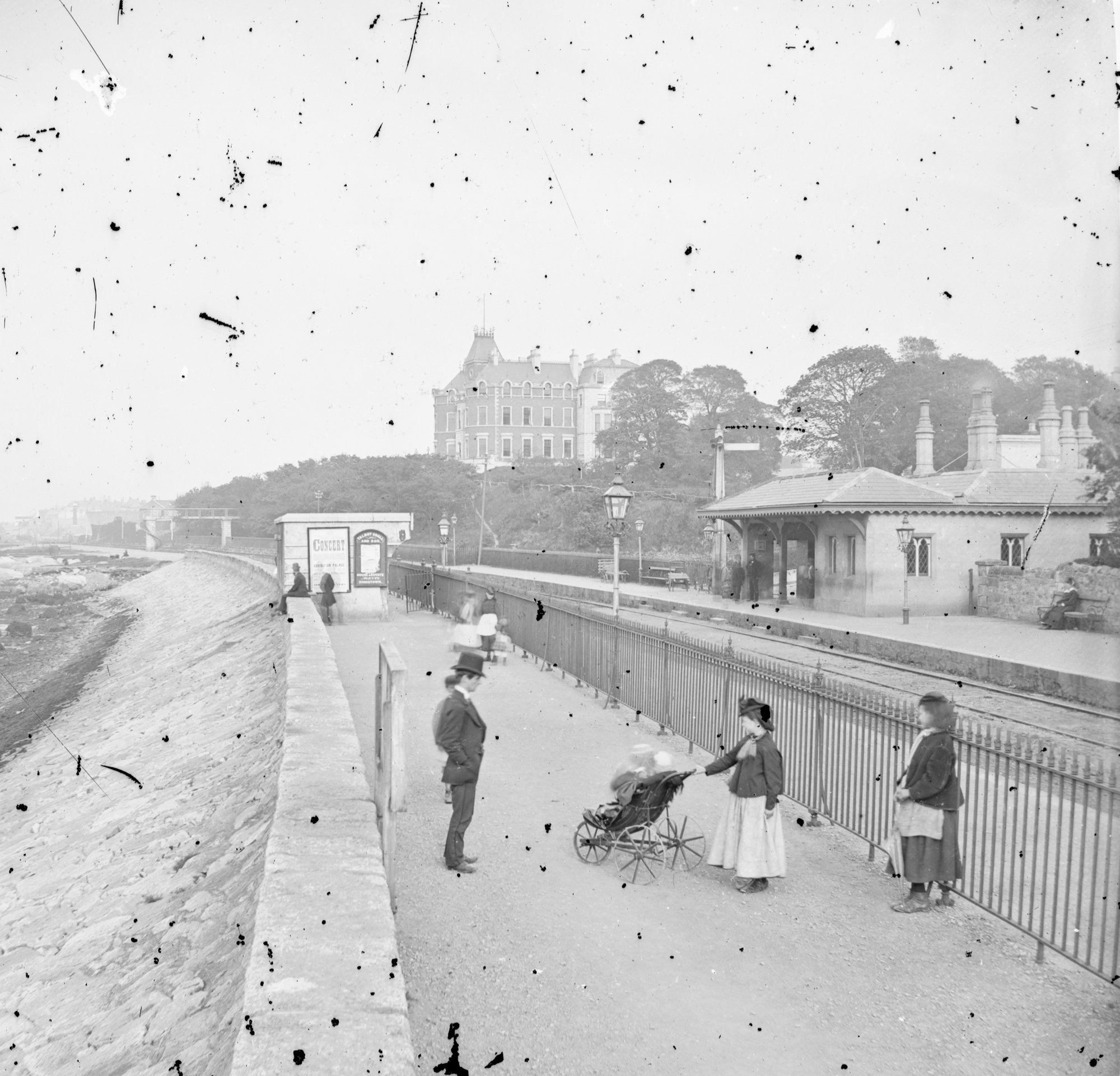
The station in Victorian times

Salthill and Monkstown railway station (Irish: Stáisiún Chnoc an tSalainn agus Baile na Manach) serves the areas of Salthill (on the coast) and Monkstown (just inland) in Dublin, Ireland.

It is on the DART line between the stations of Seapoint and Dún Laoghaire. The station has a car park, information office, automated ticket and vending machines. The information office is open between 05:45–00:15, Monday to Sunday.

== History ==
The original Salthill station opened in May 1837. It was built by the Dublin and Kingstown Railway. It closed in 1960 and was electrified and reopened in 1984 with the arrival of DART services.

== Services ==
The station is not staffed, it features no toilets and there is no Wi-Fi. There is also no enclosed waiting room, but there are multiple passenger shelters on both sides of the track. There are 2 ticket machines within the station, and a night gate is opened during the evening. There used to be a vending machine within the building however it has since been removed.

== Transport services ==
With the exception of the DART, there is no direct public transport to or from the station. The nearest bus stops are in Monkstown village, located less than 300 m from the station, which are served by the following:

Dublin Bus Routes:

- 7 / 7A from Mountjoy Square to Bride's Glen / Loughlinstown. Route 7 provides a connection to the Luas Green Line terminus at Bride's Glen
- 7N Nitelink from Dublin city centre to Shankill, via Blackrock (Fri & Sat only)

Go-Ahead Ireland Routes:

- S8 from Citywest to Dún Laoghaire, via The Square and Sandyford Business District

Private Operators

- Aircoach route 703 from Killiney to Dublin Airport, via Monkstown

There is also a taxi rank in Monkstown village and a large car park adjacent to the station.

Preceding station	Iarnród Éireann	Following station
Seapoint	DART	Dún Laoghaire; Mallin
	Historical railways	
Blackrock; Line and station open	Dublin and Kingstown Railway	Kingstown; Line and station open
Monkstown and Seapoint; Line and station open	Dublin and South Eastern Railway; Coastal line	Kingstown; Line and station open

== See also ==
- List of railway stations in Ireland
