= Scattered Practices =

Studio album by Ezekiel Honig
- Released: September 2006
- Genres: Ambient, electronic
- Length: 40:19
- Label: Microcosm Music

Ezekiel Honig chronology
Early Morning Migration w/ Morgan Packard (2005)	Scattered Practices (2006)	Surfaces of a Broken Marching Band (2008)

Professional ratings
Review scores
Source	Rating
Time Out New York	not rated link
Village Voice	not rated link
Dusted Magazine	not rated link
Grooves Magazine	not rated link

Scattered Practices is Ezekiel Honig's fourth album, released October 2006 by Microcosm Music.

== Track listing ==
1. "Going Sailing Refrain 1" – 1:40
2. "Concrete and Plastic" – 3.33
3. "Books on Tape" – 4:58
4. "Going Sailing Refrain 2" – 1:49
5. "Going Sailing Refrain 3" – 1:51
6. "Fractures and Fissures (part 1)" – 3:57
7. "Homemade Debris" – 9:36
8. "Fractures and Fissures (part 2)" – 5:35
9. "Oceans and Living Rooms" – 4:11
10. "Edit Edit Edit" – 3:09
