= Standing on a Hummingbird =

Studio album by Mark Templeton
- Released: February 2007
- Genre: Ambient, electronic
- Length: 43:06
- Label: Anticipate Recordings

Mark Templeton chronology
Frail as Breath EP (2005)	Standing on a Hummingbird (2007)	Acre Loss CD+DVD (2009)

Standing on a Hummingbird is Mark Templeton's debut full-length album, released in February 2007. It was also Anticipate Recordings' first release.

== Track listing ==
1. "Amidst Things Uncontrolled" – 5:00
2. "Pigeon Hurt" – 3.17
3. "Roots Growing" – 4:42
4. "From Verse to Verse" – 3:40
5. "Refrain From" – 1:04
6. "Tentative Growth" – 4:29
7. "Across From Golden (Remix)" – 5:05
8. "Standing on a Hummingbird" – 4:52
9. "Pattern for a Pillow" – 7:15
10. "Difficult to Light" – 5:02
