= Blackrock railway station =

Railway station in Blackrock, Dublin, Ireland

Blackrock An Charraig Dhubh
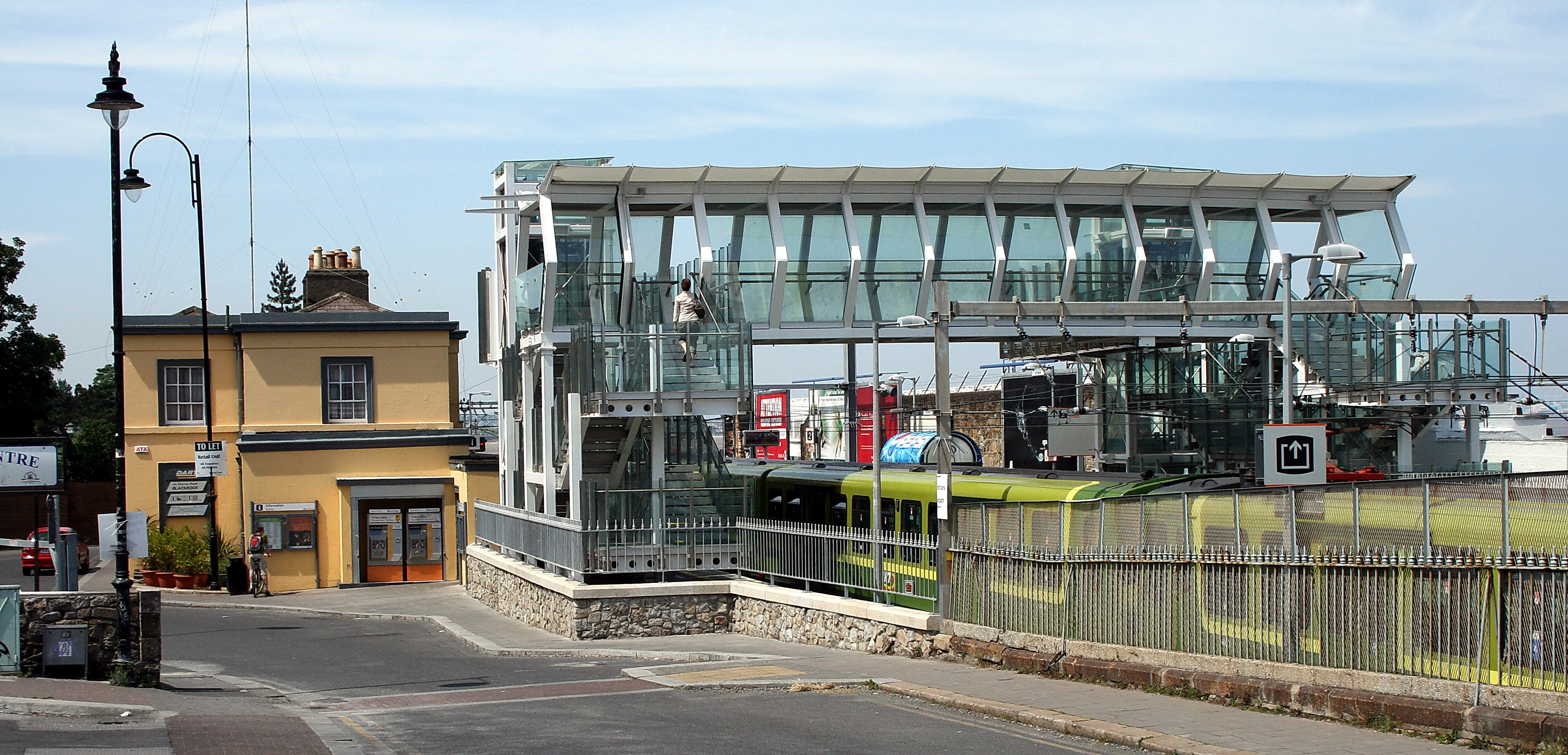

General information
- Location: Bath Place, Blackrock; County Dublin, A94 E4P9; Ireland
- Coordinates: 53.30297°N 6.17891°W
- Owner: Iarnród Éireann
- Operator: Iarnród Éireann
- Platforms: 2
- Tracks: 2
- Bus operators: Dublin Bus; Go-Ahead Ireland
- Connections: 7; 7A; 7N; 84N; 114; L26; S6

Construction
- Structure type: At-grade
- Parking: Yes
- Cycle facilities: Yes
- Accessible: Yes

Other information
- Station code: BROCK
- Fare zone: Suburban 1

History
- Opened: 17 December 1834
- Electrified: 1984
- Original company: Dublin and Kingstown Railway
- Pre-grouping: Dublin and South Eastern Railway
- Post-grouping: Great Southern Railways

Key dates
- 1857: Line regauged from 1,435 mm (4 ft 8 1/2 in) to 5 ft 3 in (1,600 mm)
- 1983: Station upgraded
- 23 July 1984: DART services commence
- 2005: Station refurbished
Location

Blackrock railway station (Irish: An Charraig Dhubh) serves Blackrock in Dún Laoghaire–Rathdown, Ireland. It opened to the public on 17 December 1834 and is one of the three original stations on the Dublin and Kingstown Railway (D&KR), the oldest public passenger railway in Ireland.

== History ==
The station opened on 17 December 1834. as one of the three original stations on the D&KR, the others being Westland Row (now Pearse) and Dún Laoghaire though the latter was subsequently rebuilt to the south of the original site a few years later. On 27 January 1858, an accident happened in the vicinity of the station.

== Services ==
The station is fully accessible and has two through platforms connected via a footbridge with lifts.

=== DART ===
From the inception of the Dublin Area Rapid Transit (DART) service in 1984, all DART services stop at Blackrock.

=== Other services ===
Blackrock is on the commuter Dundalk Dublin Maynooth routes and some trains on these routes have a scheduled stop here.

Preceding station	Iarnród Éireann	Following station
Lansdowne Road	InterCity; Dublin-Rosslare; 2tpd northbound-only	Dún Laoghaire Mallin
Sydney Parade	Commuter; Northern Commuter; Peak times only	Dún Laoghaire Mallin
Sydney Parade	Commuter; Western Commuter; Peak times only	Dún Laoghaire Mallin
Sydney Parade	Commuter; South Eastern Commuter	Dún Laoghaire Mallin
Booterstown	DART	Seapoint
	Historical railways	
Williamstown; Line open, station closed	Dublin and Kingstown Railway	Salthill; Line and station open

== Road transport services ==
Directly outside the station are bus stops served by Go-Ahead Ireland routes 114, L26 and S6 along with some private operators.

There is a taxi rank outside the station and a pay and display car park opposite the station.

== Gallery ==
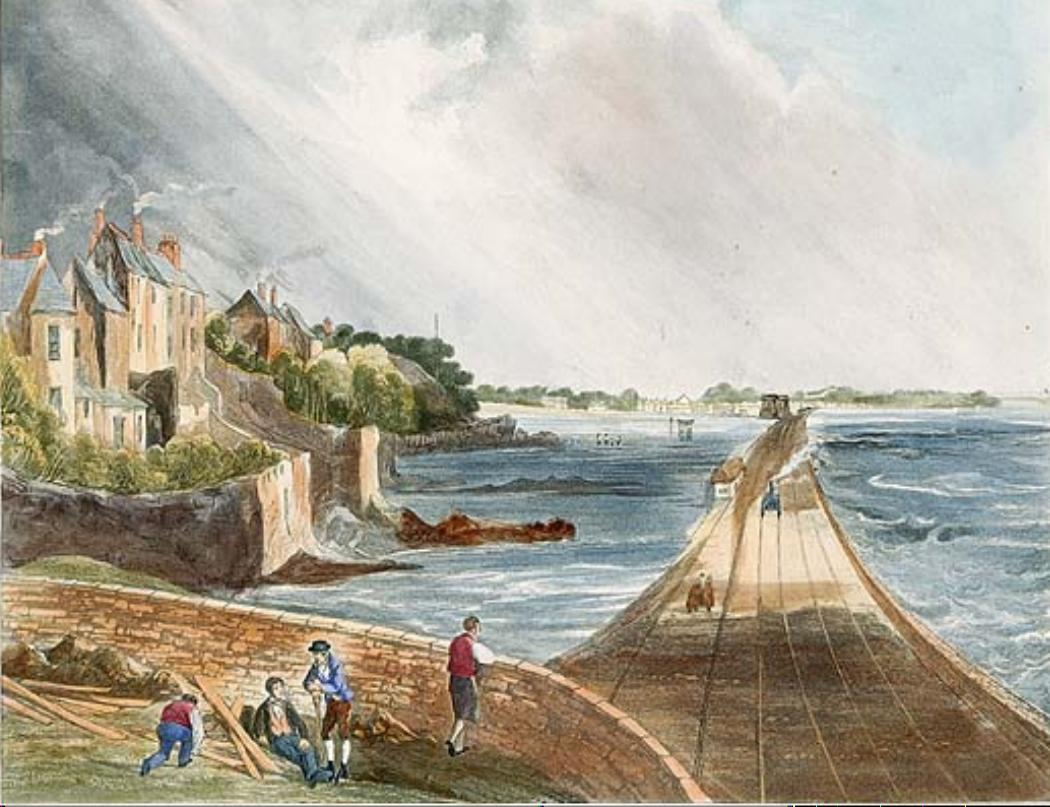
(1834) Looking north across Merrion Strand in Dublin Bay from Blackrock railway station

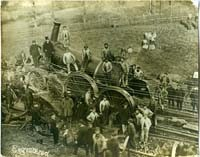
Accident as of 27 January 1858

== See also ==
- List of railway stations in Ireland
