= Early Morning Migration =

Studio album by Ezekiel Honig and Morgan Packard
- Released: July 2005
- Genre: Electronic
- Length: 52:34
- Label: Microcosm Music

Professional ratings
Review scores
Source	Rating
Textura	link
XLR8R	link
Pop Matters	link
Cyclic Defrost	link

Early Morning Migration is a minimal electronic album created by Anticipate and Microcosm label-head Ezekiel Honig with Morgan Packard. The album is Honig's third release.

== Track listing ==
1. "Tropical Ridges" (Ezekiel Honig) – 4:16
2. "Balm" (Morgan Packard) – 2:29
3. "Window Nature" (Honig) – 2:19
4. "Hibernate" (Packard) – 3:41
5. "A Lake of Suggestions Part 1" (Honig) – 4:19
6. "Billow" (Packard) – 4:47
7. "White on White" (Packard, Phil Salathé) – 4:37
8. "Planting Broken Branches Part 1" (Honig) – 4:48
9. "Planting Broken Branches Part 2" (Honig) – 6:10
10. "A Lake of Suggestions" (Honig) – 4:26
11. "A Long Time Ago" (Packard) – 10:38

== Personnel ==
- Michael Fossenkemper – mastering
- Ernie Mills – trombone on track seven
