= Sebastian Meissner =

Sebastian Meissner (born 1969 in Częstochowa, Poland) is an artist, electronic musician, journalist, radio-producer and photographer. Under monikers such as Random Inc, Random Industries and Bizz Circuits he released several albums for influential electronica label Mille Plateaux. He also composed music for German independent label Kompakt under the name Klimek. Followed up by releases on New Yorker Anticipate Recordings and Belgian Sub Rosa label. He has collaborated with Ekkehard Ehlers under the name Autopoieses and with Israeli audio-visual artist Ran Slavin as b.Z_ToneR. For his project Not By Note he received in 2011 an honorary mention in the category Digital Musics & Sound Art at Prix Ars Electronica.

His album "Walking in Jerusalem" was included by The Wire magazine in their list of top 15 electronic records of the year 2002.

Meissner performed at many notable music and sound art festival like CTM in Berlin, MUTEK in Montreal, Sónar in Barcelona, Unsound in New York, Sonic Acts in Amsterdam, Jewish Culture Festival in Kraków and Steirischen Herbst in Graz.

He recorded audio material with former Nick Cave & the Bad Seeds member Hugo Race and with Italian songwriter Marta Collica. For the opening of the 2010 New York edition of the Unsound Festival Meissner performed with Polish classical music ensemble Kwartludium at the David Rubenstein Atrium of the Lincoln Center. Under the name Solid State Transmitters they played selected compositions from the catalogue of SST Records – a music label formed in 1978 by Black Flag member Greg Ginn. An Artforum reviewer wrote about this concert the following:

What Meissner and Kwartludium were about to attempt was nothing less than a new-music interpretation of some minor classics from the cult American hardcore and alternative-rock label. Beginning with Black Flag's "I Can See You," they moved on to Blind Idiot God's "Roller Coaster," Grant Hart's "The Main," and Husker Dü's "Something I Learned Today." Accompanying each piece with a slow-dissolving projection of some of the band's record-cover illustrations (Raymond Pettibon's designs for Black Flag being the most familiar to an art-world viewer), they gave each one a different, radical, and surprisingly effective spin.

Since 2010 Meissner has been writing and directing documentary radio features for German public radio stations such as Deutschlandfunk, Deutschlandfunk Kultur, RBB and WDR3. He also composed soundtracks for some of those broadcasts. Meissner dedicated several of his long form broadcasts to the history and current affairs of United States. The topics ranged from urban explorations in Detroit, portraying native Hawaiian protesters at Mauna Kea in Hawaii and capturing Voodoo rituals in New Orleans.

== Selected discography ==
as Klimek

- Songs of Love and Fear Vol.1 & Vol.2 — 2015 (GOULDEN)
- Excitement & War — 2015 (GOULDEN)
- Live in Ramallah — 2015 (GOULDEN)
- Movies Is Magic — 2009 (Anticipate Recordings)
- Dedications — 2007 (Anticipate Recordings)
- Music To Fall Asleep — 2006 (Kompakt)
- Milk & Honey — 2004 (Kompakt)

as Random Inc

- Walking in Jerusalem — 2002 (Mille Plateaux)
- Jerusalem: Tales Outside The Framework Of Orthodoxy — 2001 (Ritornell)

as Bizz Circuits

- Bizz Circuits Play Intifada Offspring Vol. 1: Nishbar Li Ha'Zayin — 2004 (Mille Plateaux Media)
- The Very Best Of Bizz Circuits — 2002 (Deluxe)

as Random Industries

- Selected Random Works — 2000 (Ritornell)
