= Ezekiel Honig =

- Born: 1977 (age 47–48)
- Origin: New York City, U.S.
- Genres: Electronic, ambient, techno
- Occupation: Label manager
- Labels: Anticipate Recordings; Microcosm Music

Ezekiel Honig, a New York City native, is a musician and label manager for Microcosm Music and Anticipate Recordings. He is a well-known figure in the electronic music community.

Honig usually follows a strict production code on all of his songs. He uses 'found-sound' and warm melodies.

Having put out two successful albums, Technology Is Lonely and People, Places & Things, Honig collaborated with friend and fellow musician Morgan Packard on Early Morning Migration. The album received praise from critics and was a highly successful album within the subgenre. Honig's fourth album, Scattered Practices, was a departure from his earlier work. It was less techno, and more ambient. His most recent album, Surfaces of a Broken Marching Band, was released by Anticipate on October 27, 2008.

== Discography ==
Studio albums

- 2003: Technology is Lonely (Microcosm)
- 2004: People Places & Things (Microcosm)
- 2005: Early Morning Migration with Morgan Packard (Microcosm)
- 2006: Scattered Practices (Microcosm)
- 2008: Surfaces of a Broken Marching Band (Anticipate)
- 2011: Folding In On Itself (Type)
- 2015: A Film of String & Wood (Abandoned Audio)
- 2017: A Passage Of Concrete (Anticipate)

EPs/singles

- 2004: Colorfield EP (Red Antenna)
- 2004: People Places & Things Sampler with John Tejada remix (Microcosm)
- 2005: It's Getting Cold Outside EP with Someone Else remix (Unfoundsound)
- 2006: Live in Minneapolis (Microcosm)
- 2008: Porchside Past Tense limited edition 7" vinyl (Anticipate)
- 2009: Prologuing the Inevitable with David Last remix (Konque)
- 2014: Paragraphs digital download and 12" vinyl (Other People)

Splits/collaborations

- 2004: Love Session / 1000 Remix EP with Graphic (Microcosm)
- 2005: More Human Than Human Remixes with Soultek, isan, Ezekiel & Friends (Microcosm)
- 2005: Macrofun Volume 3 with Someone Else (Microcosm)
- 2006: Macrofun Volume 4 (as saidsound) with Krill.Minima (Microcosm)
- 2006: Early Morning Migration Remix EP with Morgan Packard, Socks and Sandals (Microcosm)
- 2006: The Road to Victory EP with Nicholas Sauser (Microcosm)
- 2008: Open the Door Seaside Pastures part 1 with Dapayk and Midnight (Fenou)

Remixes

- 2010: A Sunny Day In Glasgow – "Nitetime Rainbows" (Mis Ojos Discos)
- 2016: Kettenkarussell "Of Course" (Giegling)

== See also ==
- List of ambient music artists
