= Ekkehard Ehlers =

German musician

- Born: 1974 (age 51–52); Frankfurt, Germany
- Genres: Electronic music, ambient music
- Label: Staubgold

Ekkehard Ehlers (born 1974) is an artist working in the field of electronic music. In addition to his solo career, he has recorded under the monikers Auch, Betrieb and Ferdinand Fehlers and as a member of the duo Autopoesies and his band März. A BBC reviewer wrote of Ehlers music: Ehlers' music toys with your perceptions a little, opening up a space to think

== Biography ==
Ehlers was born in Frankfurt. He became interested in aesthetic theory, particularly the work of Theodor Adorno, as a university student in Frankfurt. He began working with Sebastian Meissner as Autopoieses in the late 1990s. Autopoieses was in part about the recontextualization of samples, and the duo released their well-received debut record exploring these ideas in 1999 on Mille Plateaux. Ehlers' tested the solo waters with minimal house released as Auch and Betrieb from 2000 to 2005 on Force Inc. and Klang. In 2000 Ehlers released his first solo album under his own name, the dark and abstract Betrieb. Constructed primarily of manipulated samples of Arnold Schoenberg and Charles Ives, Betrieb is steeped in theory, as evidenced by the Ehlers-penned liner notes.

In 2001, Ehlers began recording a series of singles to serve as tributes to some of his aesthetic heroes. These singles, which included "Ekkehard Ehlers Plays Cornelius Cardew" and "Ekkehard Ehlers Plays John Cassavetes" were ultimately gathered together on the 2002 album Plays. This release brought Ehlers fame outside of experimental electronic music circles. He followed it with the far more abstract Politik Braucht Keinen Feind in 2003, and then with A Life Without Fear, which incorporated blues in a typically oblique way, in 2006.

Since 2000 he started working on ballet scores for the choreographers William Forsythe and later Christoph Winkler and for Ulrich Rasche. Ehlers has curated Music festivals such as "under construction", "Audio Poverty" and "Lux Aeterna" and the Donaueschinger Musiktage 2020.

He remixed the Red Hot Chili Peppers' single "Californication" and collaborated with the band on a couple of their live sets. Two live recordings have been made called Tuesday Night in Berlin and Thursday Night in Berlin. The remixed Californication and the 14 minute improvisation jam Tuesday Night in Berlin can be found on the second version of the Red Hot Chili Peppers' Fortune Faded single. The nearly 30 minute Thursday Night In Berlin has not been released officially although a bootleg has recently leaked onto the Internet.

== Selected discography ==
- Betrieb — CD, Mille Plateaux, 2000
- März — CD, 2001 (Ehlers, Kunze) 2002–2004
- Plays — CD, Staubgold, 2002
- Music For William Forsythe — CD, Whatness, 2003 (Ehlers, Sebastian Meissner, Thom Willems)
- Politik Braucht Keinen Feind — CD, Staubgold, 2003
- Childish Music — CD, Staubgold, 2005 (compilation)
- A Life Without Fear — CD, Staubgold, 2006
- Ballads — CD, Staubgold, 2009 (with Paul Wirkus)
- Adikia — CD, Staubgold, 2012
