= Frail as Breath =

EP by Mark Templeton
- Released: September 2005
- Genre: Ambient, electronic
- Length: 14:55
- Label: Independent/Robotopera

Mark Templeton chronology
Frail as Breath (2005)	Standing on a Hummingbird (2007)

Frail as Breath is an independently released solo EP by Canadian electronic artist Mark Templeton. The album was re-released in connection with net label Robotopera in 2005.

Professional ratings
Review scores
Source	Rating
Edmonton Journal [09/24/2005]	
EtherREAL	link
Textura	link

== Track listing ==
1. "Not Alone Anymore" – 4:13
2. "Continue Later" – 2:57
3. "Birds" – 1:16
4. "Drama Section" – 3:29
5. "Spring Breakup" – 3:00
