= Dún Laoghaire railway station =

Rail station in Ireland

Dún Laoghaire Mallin Stáisiún Uí Mhealláin
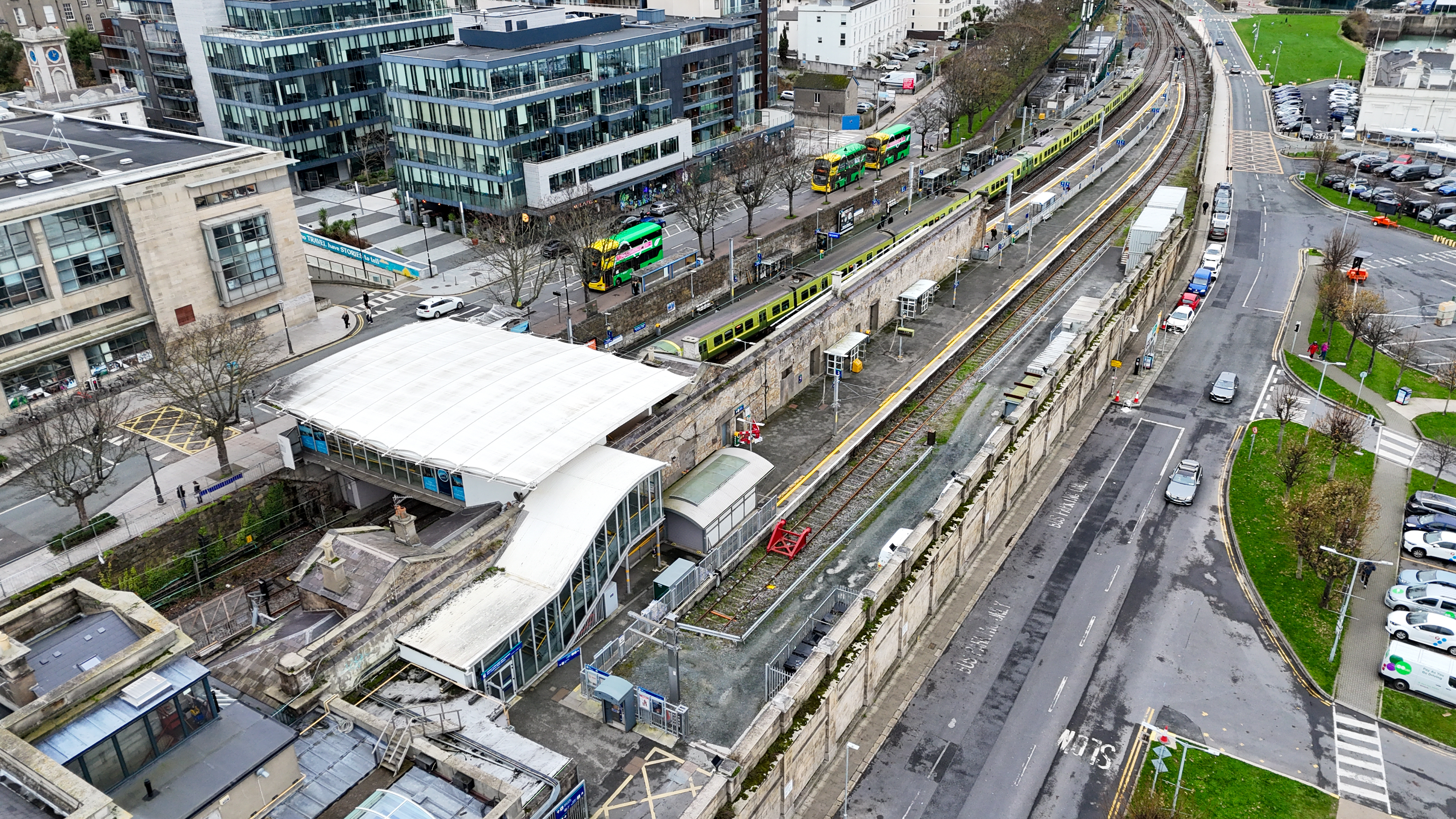
- Dún Laoghaire railway station in 2025

General information
- Location: Crofton Road, Dún Laoghaire; County Dublin, A96 N7C6; Ireland
- Coordinates: 53.2949°N 6.1345°W
- Owner: Iarnród Éireann
- Operator: Iarnród Éireann
- Platforms: 3 (only 2 see regular use)
- Tracks: 2
- Bus operators: Aircoach; Dublin Bus; Go-Ahead Ireland
- Connections: 7; 7A; 7N; 45A; 45B; 59; 111; 702; E2; L25; L27; S8

Construction
- Structure type: At-grade
- Parking: No
- Cycle facilities: Stands outside
- Accessible: Yes
- Architect: John Skipton Mulvany

Other information
- Station code: DLERY
- Fare zone: Suburban 2

History
- Opened: 1837 (as Kingstown Harbour)
- Original company: Dublin and Kingstown Railway
- Pre-grouping: Dublin and South Eastern Railway
- Post-grouping: Great Southern Railways

Key dates
- 1861: Station renamed Kingstown
- 1921: Station renamed Dún Laoghaire
- 1957: Second through platform built
- 1966: Station renamed Dún Laoghaire Mallin
- 1971: Original station entrance closed
- 1983: Station upgraded
- 1984: DART services commence
- 1997: Current station entrance built
Location

Dún Laoghaire Mallin railway station (Irish: Stáisiún Uí Mhealláin, Dún Laoghaire) is a station in Dún Laoghaire, Dún Laoghaire–Rathdown, Ireland.

== History ==
The original station for Dún Laoghaire, then known as Kingstown, was situated some 0.5 miles (0.80 km) closer to Dublin at the West Pier near to or at the present-day Salthill and Monkstown railway station. That station was the southern terminus of the first railway in Ireland, the Dublin and Kingstown Railway (D&KR), which opened in 1834. For the first public timetable the station was named Kingstown but in contract documents it was at least sometimes referred to as Dunleary.

Before the D&KR had even begun to be built it became apparent that the packet boats were to use either the East Pier or the new wharf being built. Therefore, in 1833 the D&KR raised a parliamentary bill so its railway could be extended beyond the East Pier with a new station at Kingstown, then on to Dalkey. (Note: The D&KR had some eventual ambitions of reaching Bray) Mobilised opposition from a rival canal group and local opposition caused the Bill to fail in June 1833.

The D&KR regrouped and with lobbying presented a less ambitious bill to the site of the current station only in 1834. Thomas M. Gresham, a D&KR shareholder and main spokesperson for the opposition, being awarded a silver plate in August 1833 for the same at a personal cost of £1,200, was persuaded not to oppose the 1834 bill. Other obstacles including an agreement to cross the old part of Dunleary harbour and demolition of a Martello fortification needed an agreement with the Admiralty and Ordnance. The bill was passed in May 1834 but logistics meant Dargan began work in May 1836 finishing about a year later. The new terminus opened on 13 May 1837, the first train being a special with D&KR directors and friends. (Note: The 1837 station was essentially based on the north of the current station at and beyond the current Platform 3 terminus platform)

The original station building was an apparently insufficient Station House and Parcel Office and in 1840 the D&KR resolved to replace it, (Note: It would reasonable there was work to buildings for the opening of the Dalkey Atmospheric in 1844 but this seems difficult to source) hiring J. S. Mulvaney as designer. The new station building eventually cost £2,500 and was designed by Mulvaney using stone quarried in Ballyknockan, County Wicklow in preference to granite from Dalkey quarry (which was located much closer). The platforms were finally covered in 1845 by a temporary structure costing £122 which was later extended for £300.

On 29 March 1844, the Dalkey Atmospheric Railway officially opened. The line was a branch of the existing D&KR which diverged to the south when approaching from the west with an interchange platform (Note: This is the current platform 2 which was much wider at its eastern end than now) before the atmospheric ran as a single track eastbound into the tunnel. While through running was possible it was not used.

Grierson notes that the station build was completed in 1853 to a design by John Skipton Mulvany by Mr. Roberts doing the "masonry, carpentry, ironmongery, &c," for £1,665. L This included the station walls, (Note: This may refer to the high station walls still showing in pictures in 2017 to the north of the station and between platforms 2 and 3) while ironwork, roof, and plumbing cost £1,031 by I. & R. Mallet. The roof has since been removed. The station house above the platforms was completed in 1854. a structure in a neo-classical style, designed also by Mulvany. This was the station building until 1971 when the current arrangement was introduced. Mulvany's building became reused as a restaurant. (Note: The precise order and details of the builds between 1840 and 1854 have some details that seem somewhat difficult to resolve between the sources and may require expert interpretation or better sources)

The Dalkey Atmospheric ceased operation in 1854. The Dublin, Wicklow and Wexford Railway exercised their rights and rebuilt the Dalkey to Kingstown section as a conventional railway at 5 ft 3 in (1,600 mm) removing height restrictions. When they ran their first train into Kingstown on 10 October 1855, the D&KR directors refused them the use of the station and the passengers were forced to return towards Dalkey, this also happening for some days afterwards. On 30 March 1856, both the D&KR and D&WR concurred with the D&KR's engineer D. B. Gibbons assessment that the rebuild under Brunel was not to the parliamentary approved specification in terms and had safety issues and it was closed for rework by William Dargan as an accident would be disastrous for both companies. Dargan converted the down line between Kingstown and Old Dun Leary harbour to dual gauge so the spoil could be dumped there. (Note: this would have been in the part put off by the railway which had issues of holding stagnant water) and was able to complete the re-work quickly. When the Dalkey-Bray section re-opened on 1 July 1856 the D&KR handed all its operations to the D&WR. The D&WR converted their newly acquired line to 5 ft 3 in (1,600 mm) in the next year or so enabling through running.

Carlisle Pier with its branch on the single track section just to the east of the station was created in 1859.

Although it lay on a double-track railway for over ninety years, Dún Laoghaire station had only one through platform with a bay platform facing Dublin, both on the seaward side of the station. The station lay on a short section of a single line that ran from just north of the station, to just past the junction for the branch to Carlisle Pier, which was controlled by a signal box known as the 'Hole in the Wall Box.' This arrangement created a bottleneck for intensive steam-hauled suburban services to/from Bray. It was not until 1957 that CIÉ remedied the situation by providing a second through platform. Further improvements were carried out in connection with the introduction of DART electric trains in 1984.

A replacement station entrance, with a combined ticket office and automated barriers, was built above the railway lines at street level in 1998. It was constructed with a steel framework supporting a taut sail-like canopy and with glazed panels as side features.

=== Naming ===
Also called Kingstown Harbour the station was renamed Kingstown in 1861, and renamed Dún Laoghaire in 1921. It was given the additional name "Mallin" on 10 April 1966, 50 years after the Easter Rising, when Córas Iompair Éireann renamed 15 major stations after Republican leaders. It is named in honour of Michael Mallin, a leader in the 1916 Easter Rising. although it is usually referred to simply as Dún Laoghaire.

== Services ==
Dún Laoghaire has two through platforms and one terminal platform. Unusually, the station building is on a bridge above the platforms, in a setup similar to Leixlip Louisa Bridge railway station. The station has a ticket office, automatic ticket machines and a small coffee shop. The ticket office is open between 05:45-00:06 AM, Monday to Sunday.

=== DART ===
From the inception of the Dublin Area Rapid Transit (DART) service in 1984, all DART services stop at Dún Laoghaire.

=== Other services ===
Dún Laoghaire is on the intercity Dublin-Rosslare and commuter Dundalk-Dublin-Arklow-Gorey routes and all trains on these routes stop here. They often run non-stop between Dun Laoghaire and Dublin Pearse, and freight and maintenance trains pass through Dún Laoghaire without stopping.

Preceding station	Iarnród Éireann	Following station
Blackrock or Dublin Pearse	InterCity; Dublin-Rosslare	Bray Daly
Blackrock	Commuter; Northern Commuter; Peak times only	Bray Daly or Terminus
Blackrock	Commuter; Western Commuter; Peak times only	Bray Daly or Terminus
Blackrock	Commuter; South Eastern Commuter	Bray Daly
Salthill & Monkstown	DART	Sandycove & Glasthule or Terminus
	Historical railways	
Salthill	Dublin and Kingstown Railway	Terminus
Terminus	Dalkey Atmospheric Railway	Dalkey
Westland Row (later Dublin Pearse); Line and station open	Dublin and South Eastern Railway; Dun Laoghaire boat train	Carlisle Pier; Line and station closed

== Transport services ==
Directly outside the station are bus stops for Dublin Bus, Go-Ahead Ireland and other private bus operator routes, a full list of which is provided below:

Dún Laoghaire Mallin Station Bus Services as of May 2026
Route	Origin	Destination	Via & Notes	Operator
7	Mountjoy Square	Brides Glen Luas	Via Ballsbridge, Blackrock, and Dún Laoghaire	Dublin Bus
7A	Mountjoy Square	Loughlinstown Park	Via Ballsbridge, Blackrock, and Dún Laoghaire	Dublin Bus
7N	D'Olier Street	Woodbrook College	Via Ballsbridge, Blackrock, Dún Laoghaire, Dalkey or Glenageary, and Ballybrack Nitelink service: operates southbound only on Friday & Saturday evenings	Dublin Bus
45A	Dún Laoghaire Station	Kilmacanogue	Via Ballybrack, Shankill, and Bray	Go-Ahead Ireland
45B	Dún Laoghaire Station	Kilmacanogue	Via Ballybrack, Shanganagh Cliffs Estate, Shankill, and Bray Operates twice per day, once in each direction	Go-Ahead Ireland
59	Dún Laoghaire Station	Killiney	Via Dalkey	Go-Ahead Ireland
111	Brides Glen Luas	Dalkey	Via Ballybrack and Dún Laoghaire Station	Go-Ahead Ireland
E2	Harristown	Dún Laoghaire Station	Via Ballymun, Glasnevin, Phibsborough, and O'Connell Street	Dublin Bus
L25	Dundrum Luas	Dún Laoghaire Station	Via Stillorgan and Monkstown	Dublin Bus
L27	Leopardstown Valley	Dún Laoghaire Station	Via Carrickmines	Go-Ahead Ireland
S8	Citywest	Dún Laoghaire Station	Via Tallaght and Sandyford Luas	Go-Ahead Ireland

There is also a taxi rank near the station on Marine Road, and a car park adjacent to the station in the harbour area.

The station is where the Killiney-Dún Laoghaire footpath "The Metals" (Ná Ráillí) ends.

It is also next to the former Dún Laoghaire Ferryport, for Stena Line services to Holyhead. This service ceased in September 2014.

== See also ==
- List of railway stations in Ireland

== Gallery ==
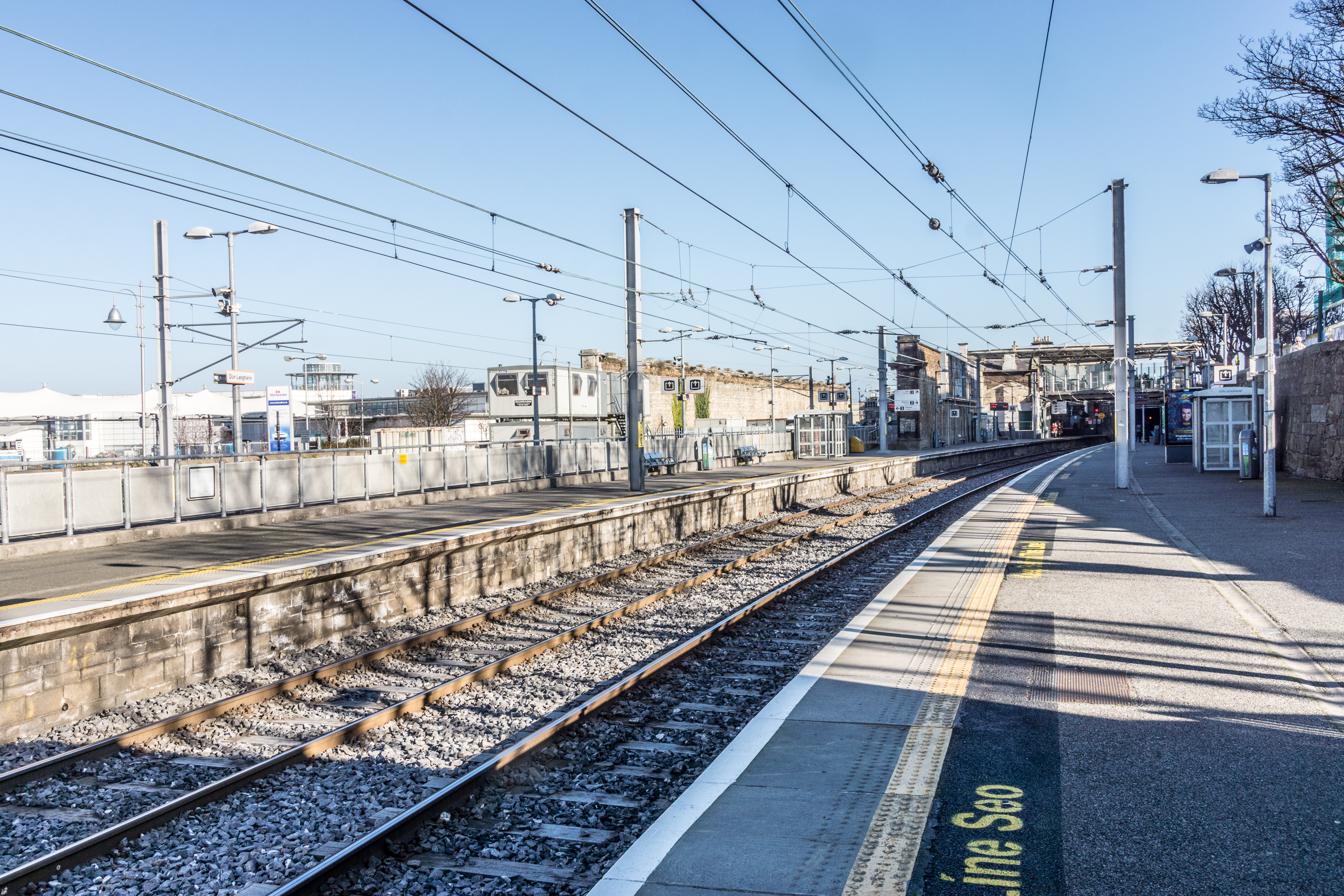
The station in 2014

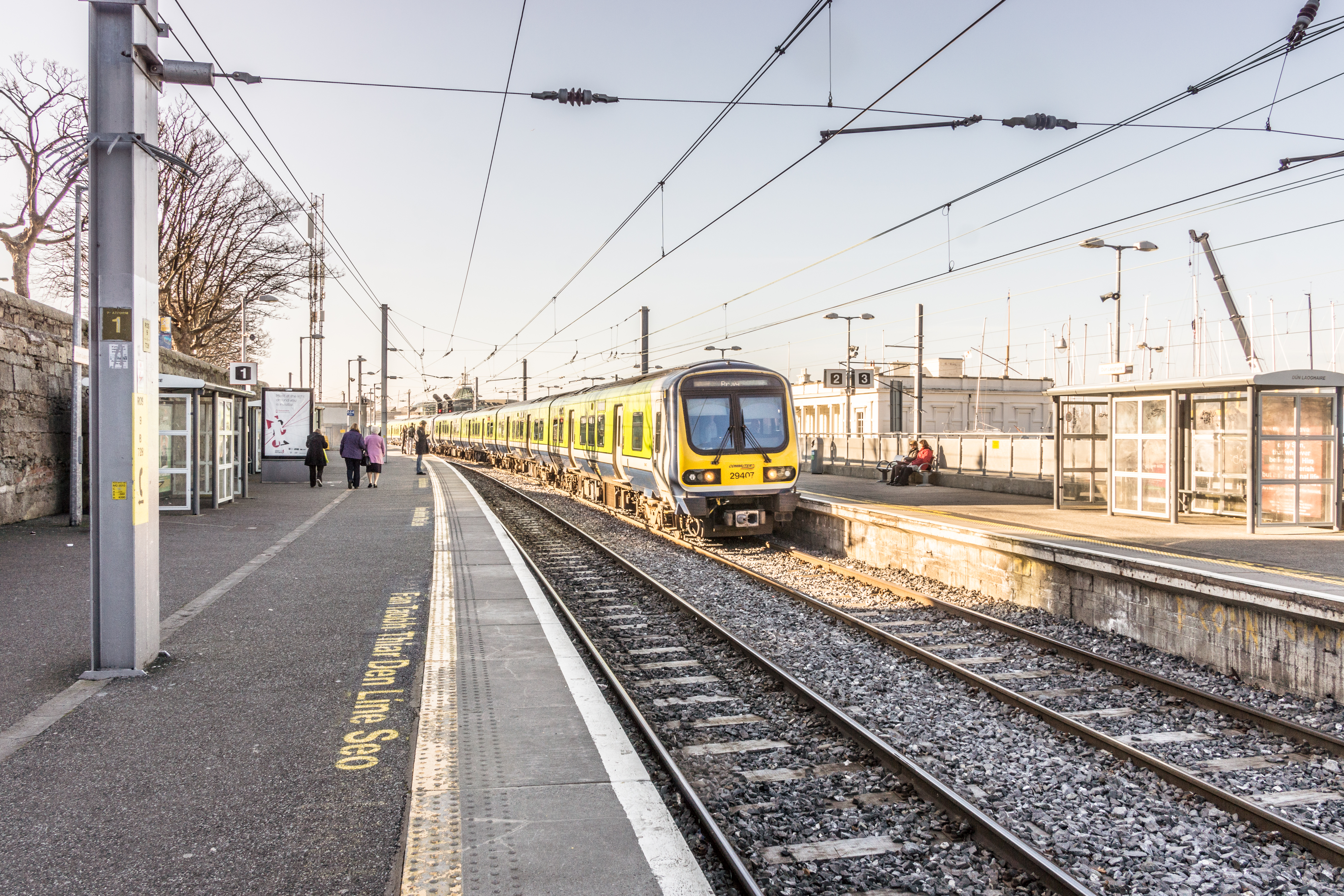
Commuter train arrives from Dublin

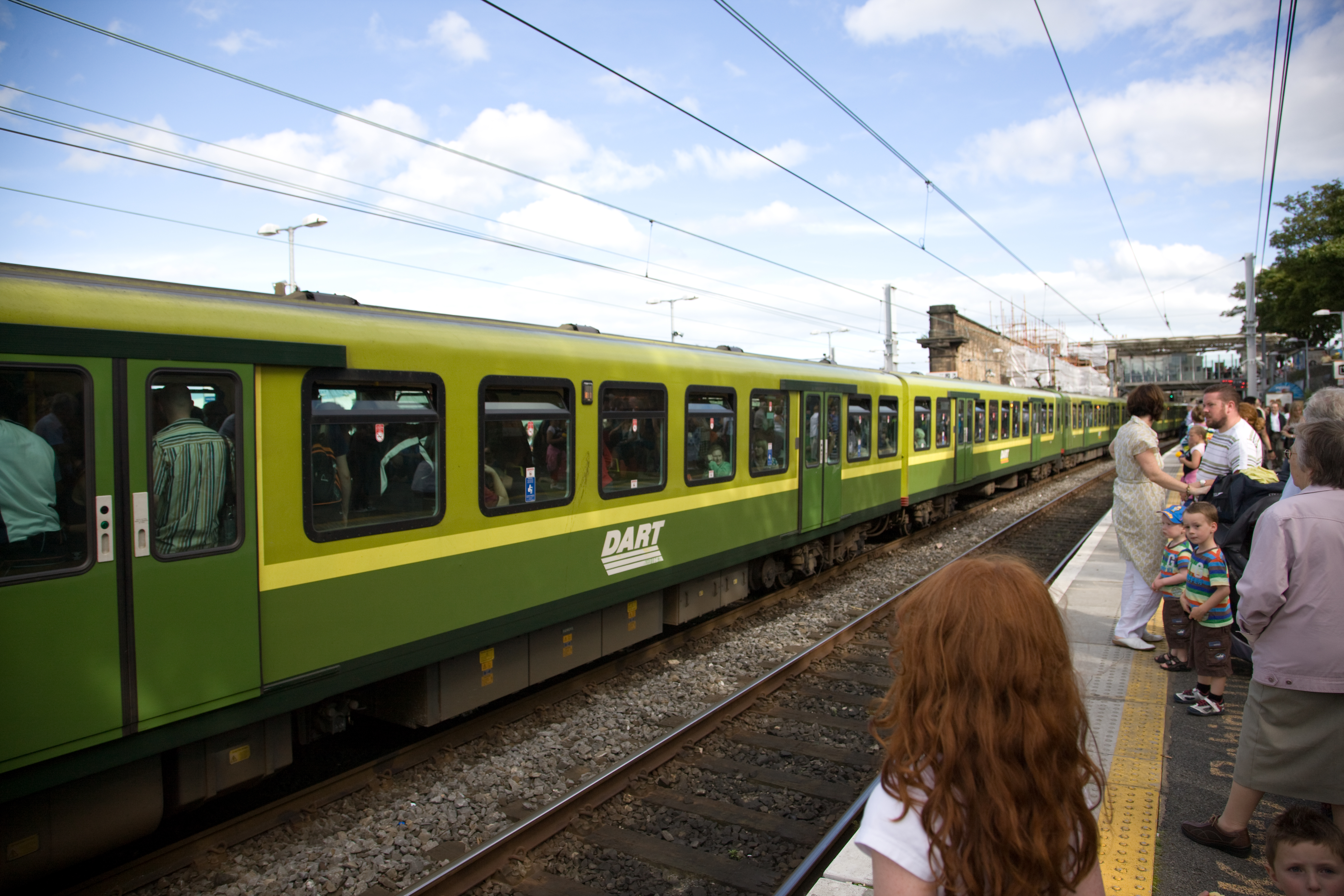
DART 8300 Class at Dún Laoghaire Mallin station in 2008

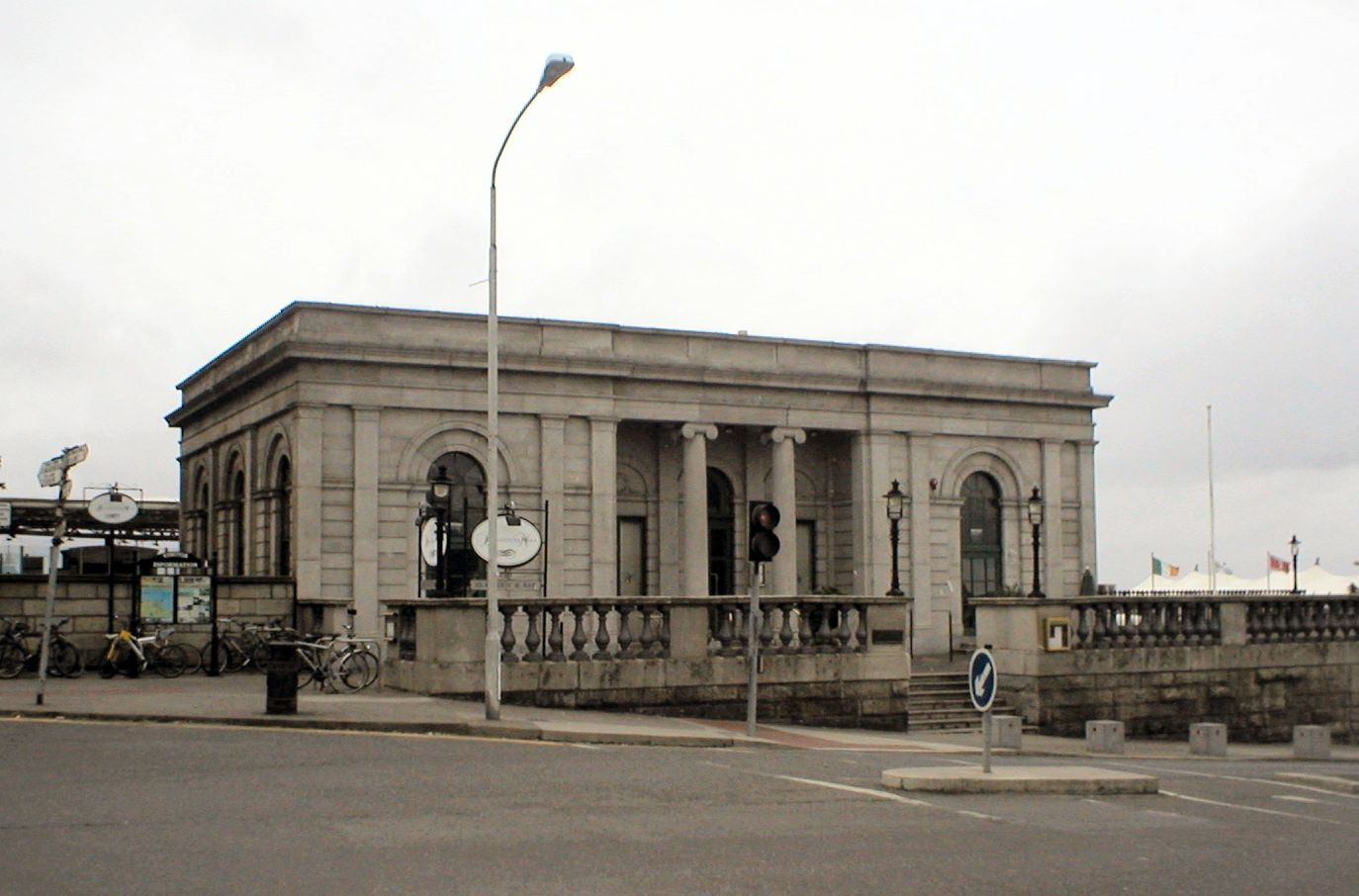
The previous station entrance in 2007

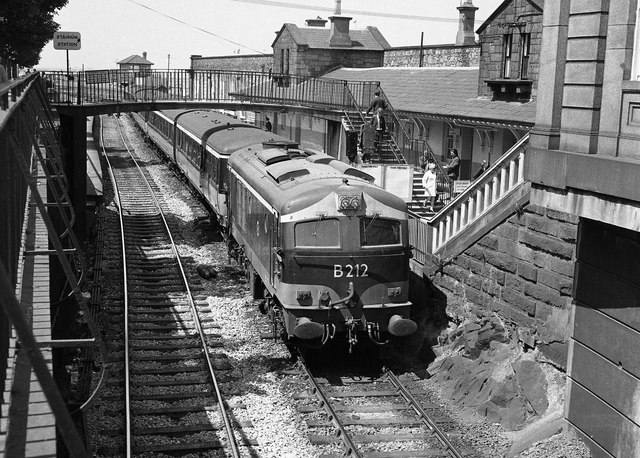
June 1975, the footbridge was later to become the main entrance

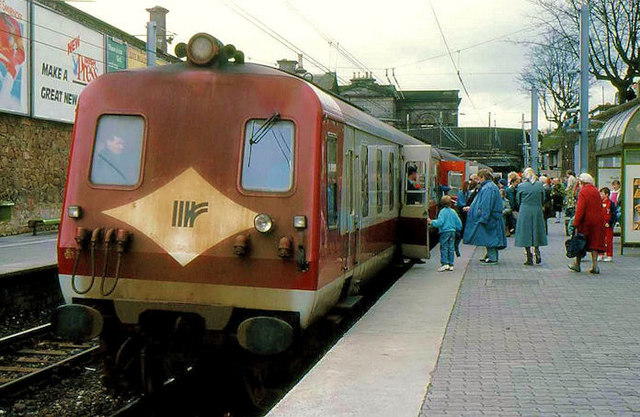
Chartered NIR diesel train in 1982 before the new entrance

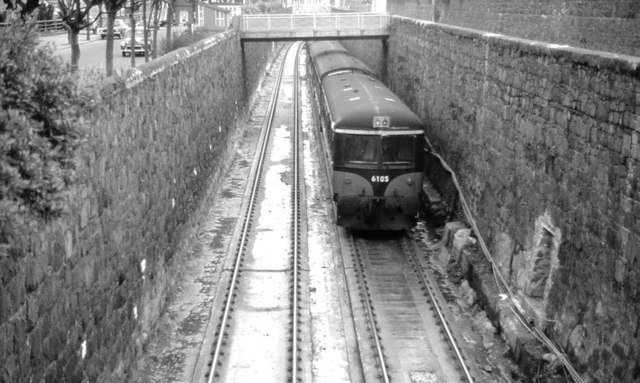
Train in cutting south of the station in 1982

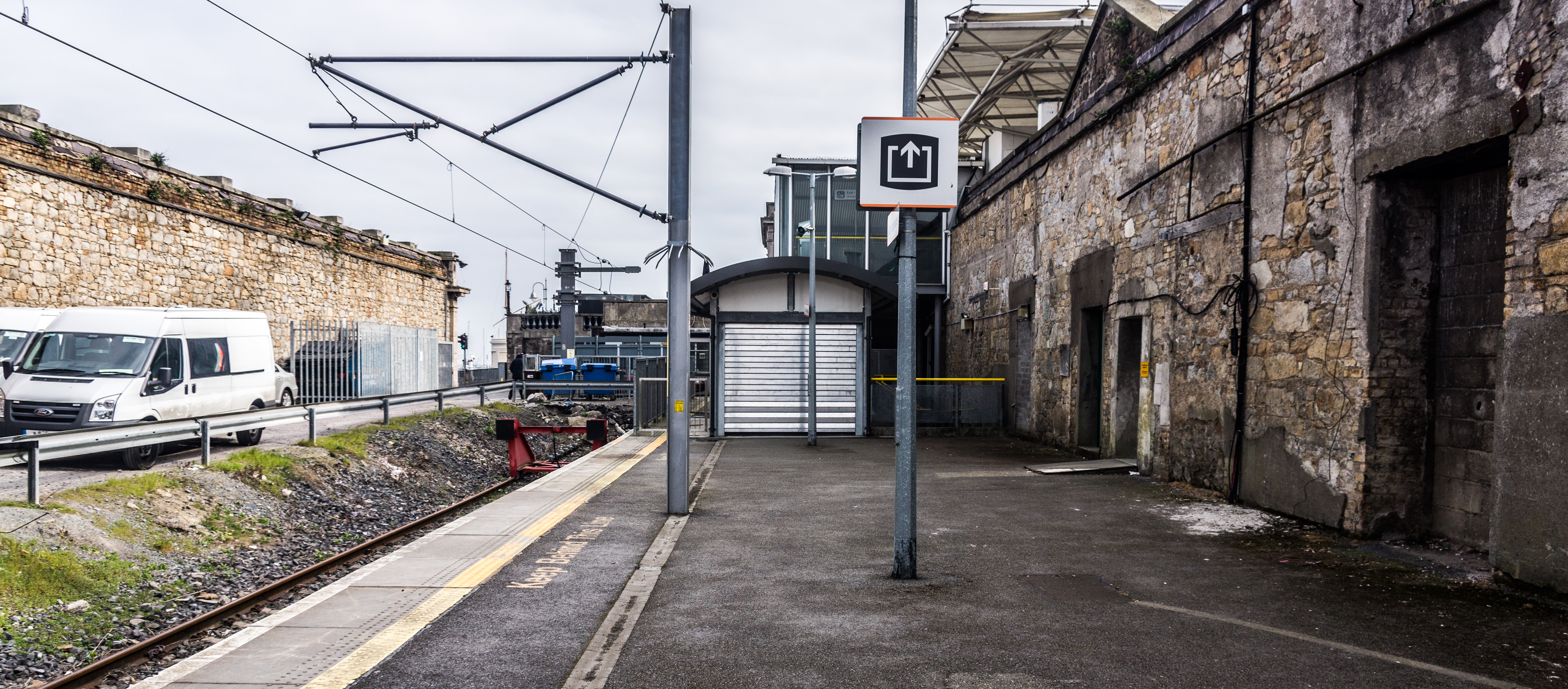
The terminus platform in 2012, the other side of the wall from the through platforms

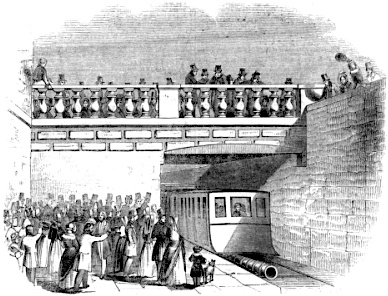
Dalkey Atmospheric Railway used what is now platform two which was previously wider

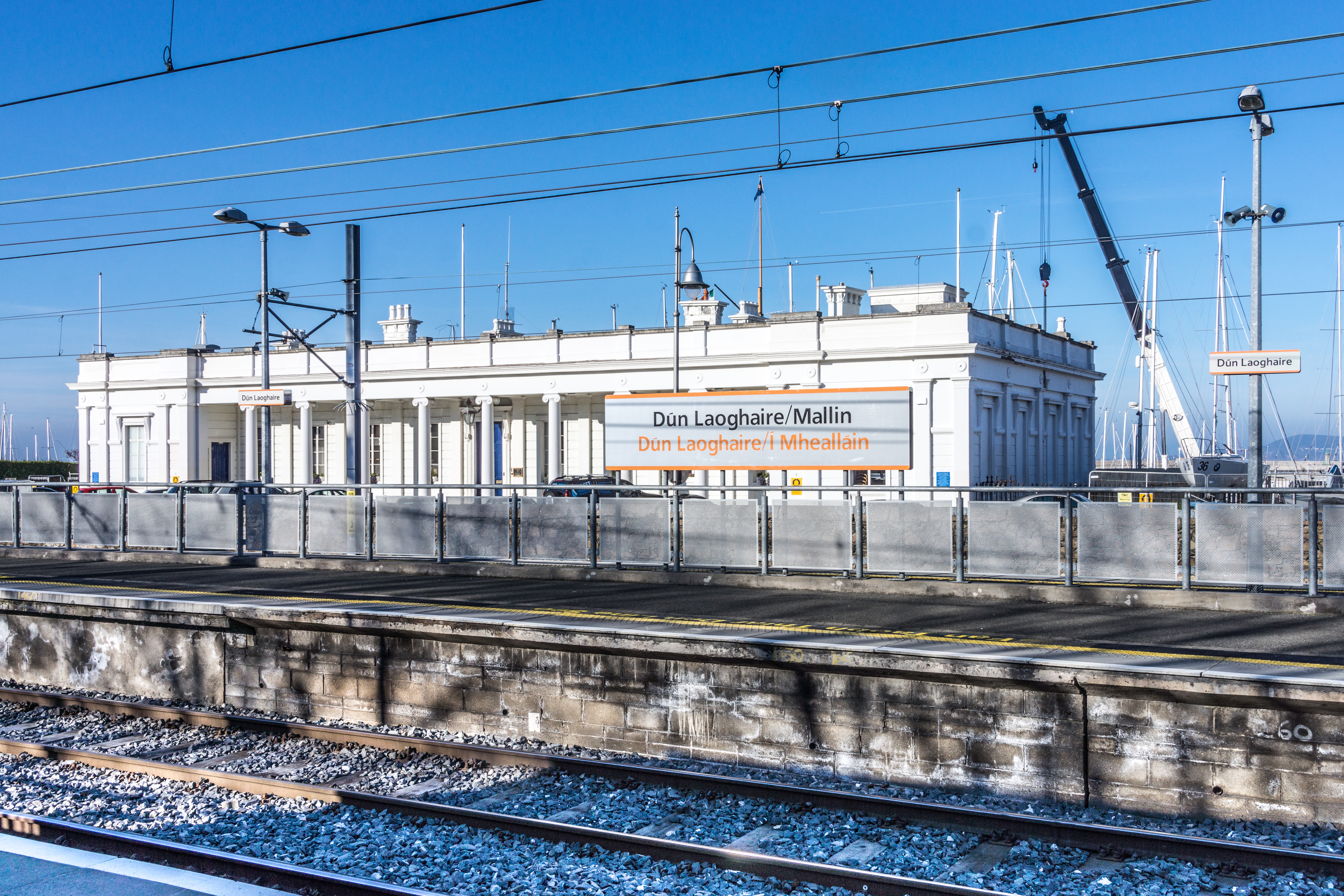
The southbound platform with the Royal Irish Yacht Club building to rear in 2014

== Sources ==
- Grierson, Thomas B (1887). "The enlargement of Westland Row Terminus Part I". Transactions of the Institution of Civil Engineers of Ireland. 18. Institution of Civil Engineers of Ireland. Archived from the original on 23 July 2019.
- Little, Stephen (June 2015). "5.11 Architectural Heritage". Proposed cruise berth facility, Dun Laoghaire Harbour, Environmental Impact Statement (PDF) (Report). Archived from the original on 23 September 2019.
- Kullmann, Kurt (28 May 2018). The First Irish Railway: Westland Row to Kingstown. THP Ireland. ISBN 978-0750987646.
- Murray, K. A. (1981). Ireland's First Railway. Dublin: Irish Railway Record Society. ISBN 0-904078-07-8.
- Pearson, Peter (1981). Dun Laoghaire Kingstown. Dublin: O'Brien Press. ISBN 0-905140-83-4. OL 22450451M.
- Scannell, James (1 March 2009). "From Kingstown to Dalkey By Air (The Atmospheric Railway 1844-1854)". Dublin Historical Record. 62 (1). Dublin: Old Dublin Society: 83–97. JSTOR 27806814.
