= Seapoint railway station =

Railway station in Ireland

Seapoint Rinn na Mara
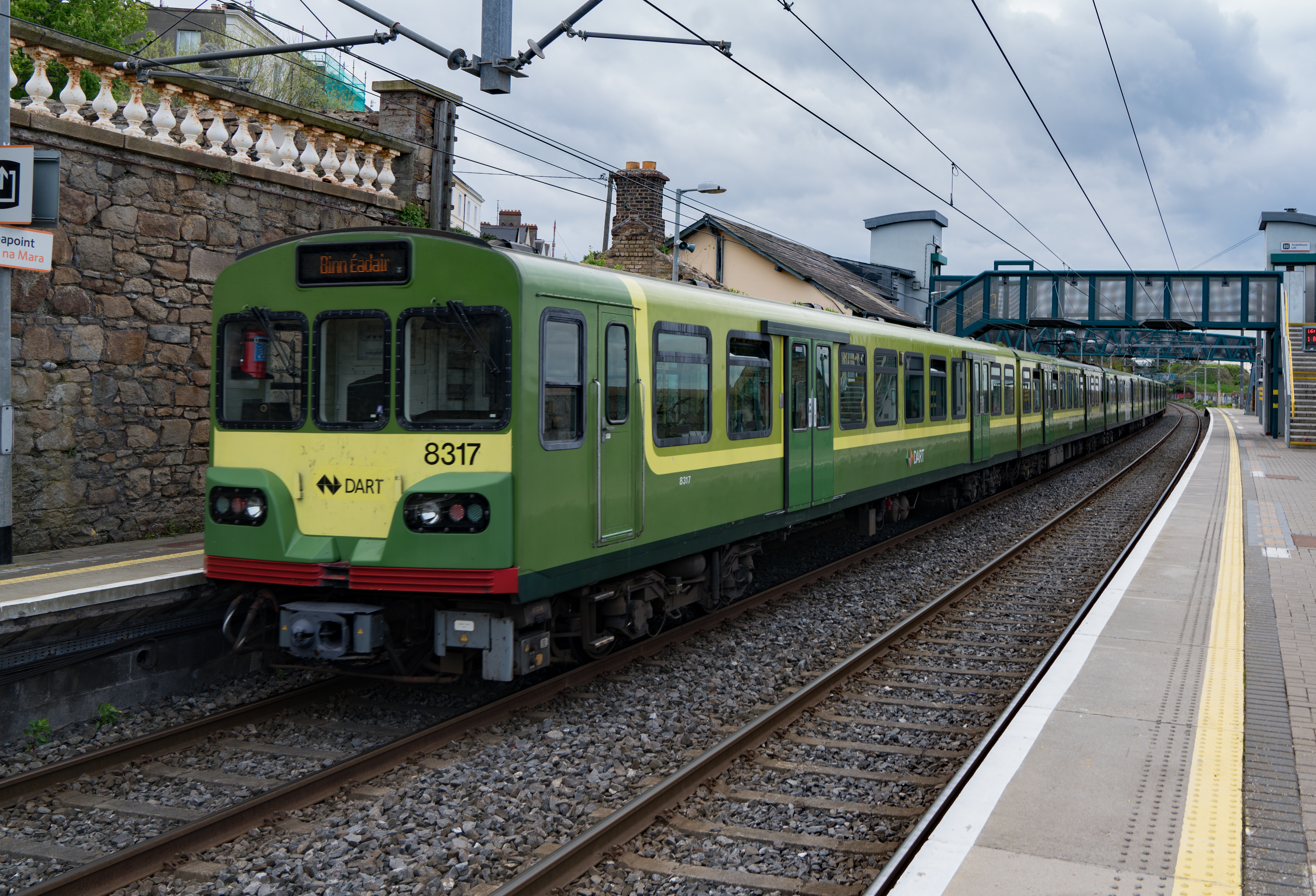
- A DART 8100 class at Seapoint.

General information
- Location: Seapoint Avenue; Blackrock, Dublin, A94 YN88; Ireland
- Coordinates: 53.29910°N 6.16505°W
- Owner: Iarnród Éireann
- Operator: Iarnród Éireann
- Platforms: 2
- Tracks: 2

Construction
- Structure type: At-grade
- Accessible: Yes

Other information
- Station code: SEAPT
- Fare zone: Suburban 2

History
- Opened: 1 July 1862 (as Monkstown and Seapoint)
- Original company: Dublin, Wicklow and Wexford Railway
- Pre-grouping: Dublin and South Eastern Railway
- Post-grouping: Great Southern Railways

Key dates
- 1863: Station renamed Seapoint
- 1983: Station upgraded
- 2006: Station refurbished
Location

Seapoint railway station (Irish: Stáisiún Rinn na Mara) serves the locality of Seapoint, between Blackrock and Salthill in Dún Laoghaire–Rathdown, Ireland.

== History ==
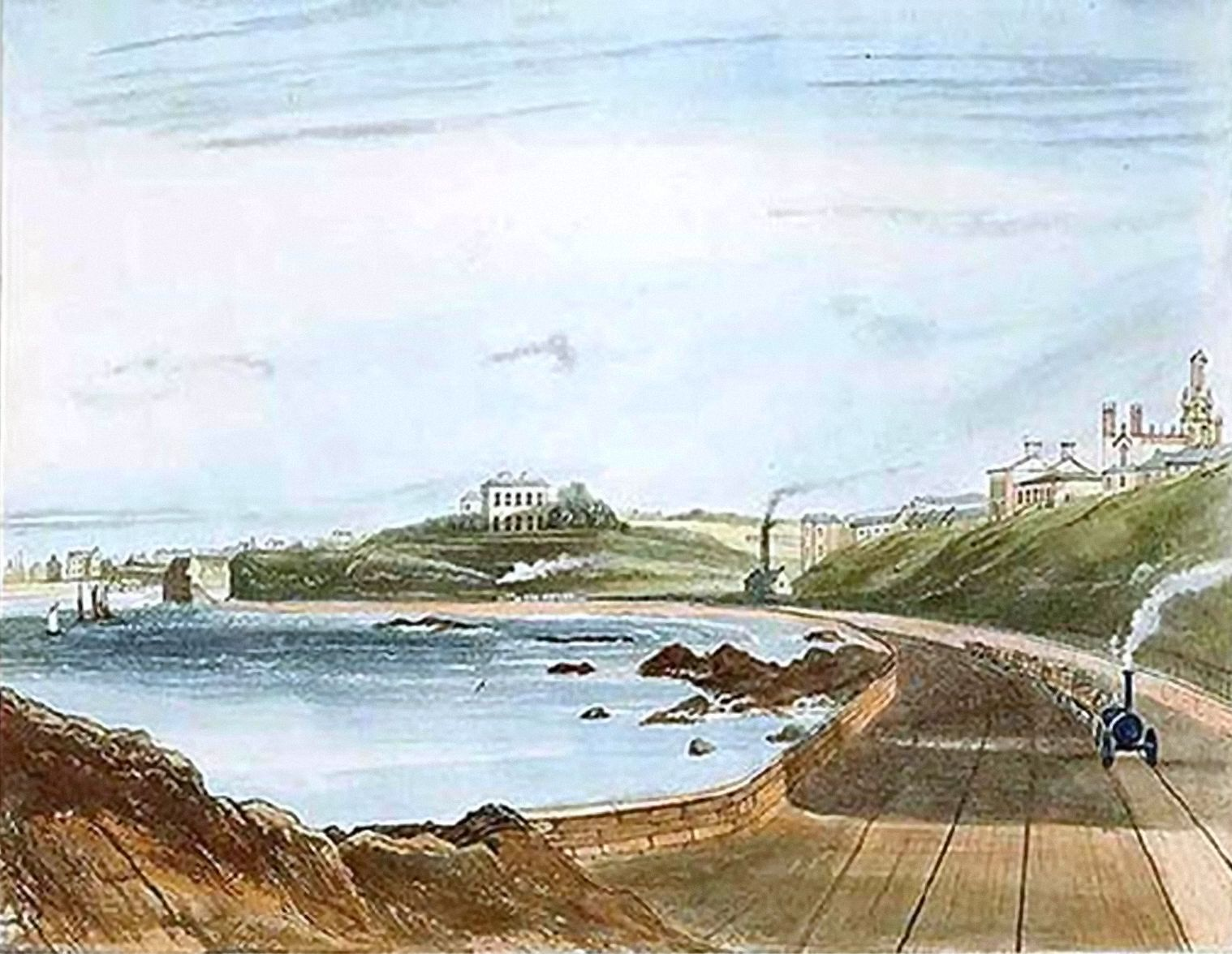
Seapoint station as viewed from the Martello Tower when it first opened.

The station opened on 1 July 1862 and was originally called Monkstown & Seapoint, though the following year this was changed to just Seapoint. It was upgraded and electrified in 1984 with the arrival of DART services.

== Transport services ==
There is no direct public transport to or from the station. The nearest bus stops are on Monkstown Road, located 450 m from the station, which are served by the following:

Dublin Bus Routes:

- 7 / 7A from Mountjoy Square to Bride's Glen / Loughlinstown. Route 7 provides a connection to the Luas Green Line terminus at Bride's Glen
- 7N Nitelink from Dublin city centre to Shankill, via Blackrock (Friday & Saturday only)

== See also ==
- List of railway stations in Ireland

Preceding station	Iarnród Éireann	Following station
Blackrock	DART	Salthill & Monkstown
