= Seapoint =

Coastal area and beach in Ireland

Coordinates: 53.29771°N 6.159683°W

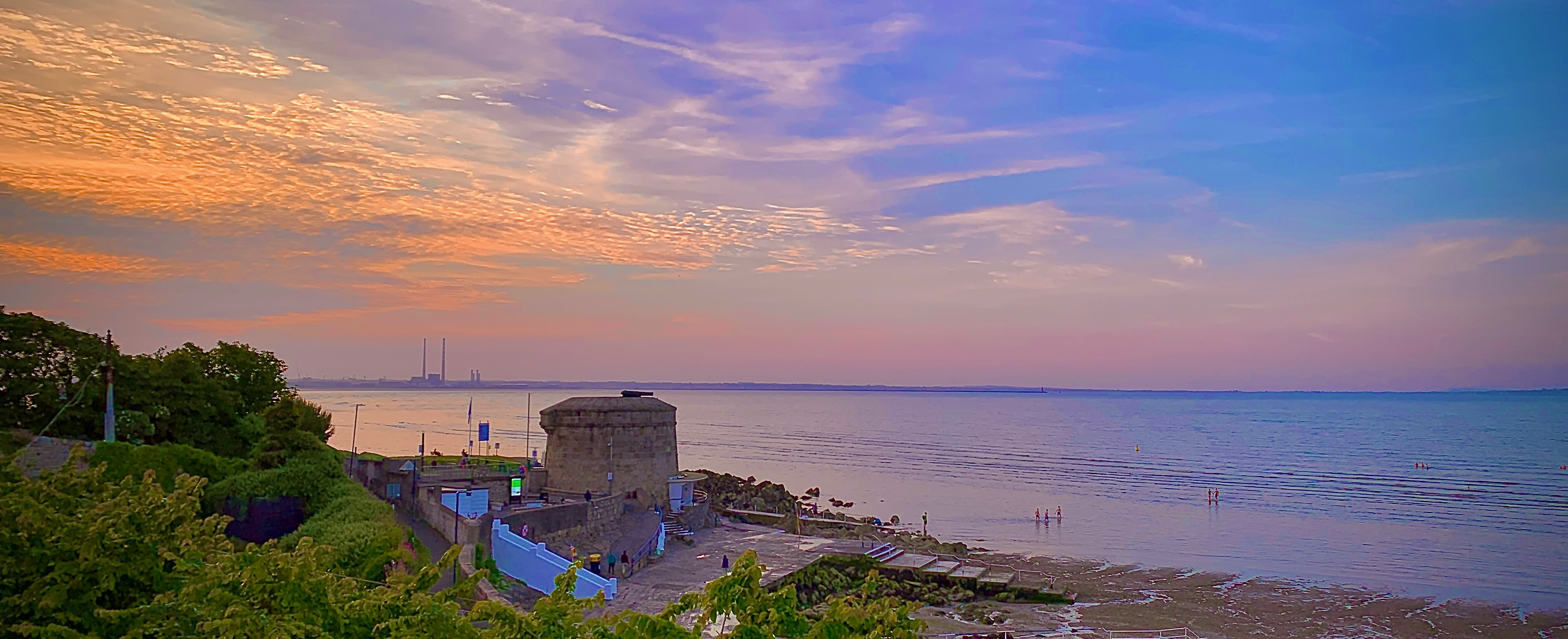
Sunset at Seapoint

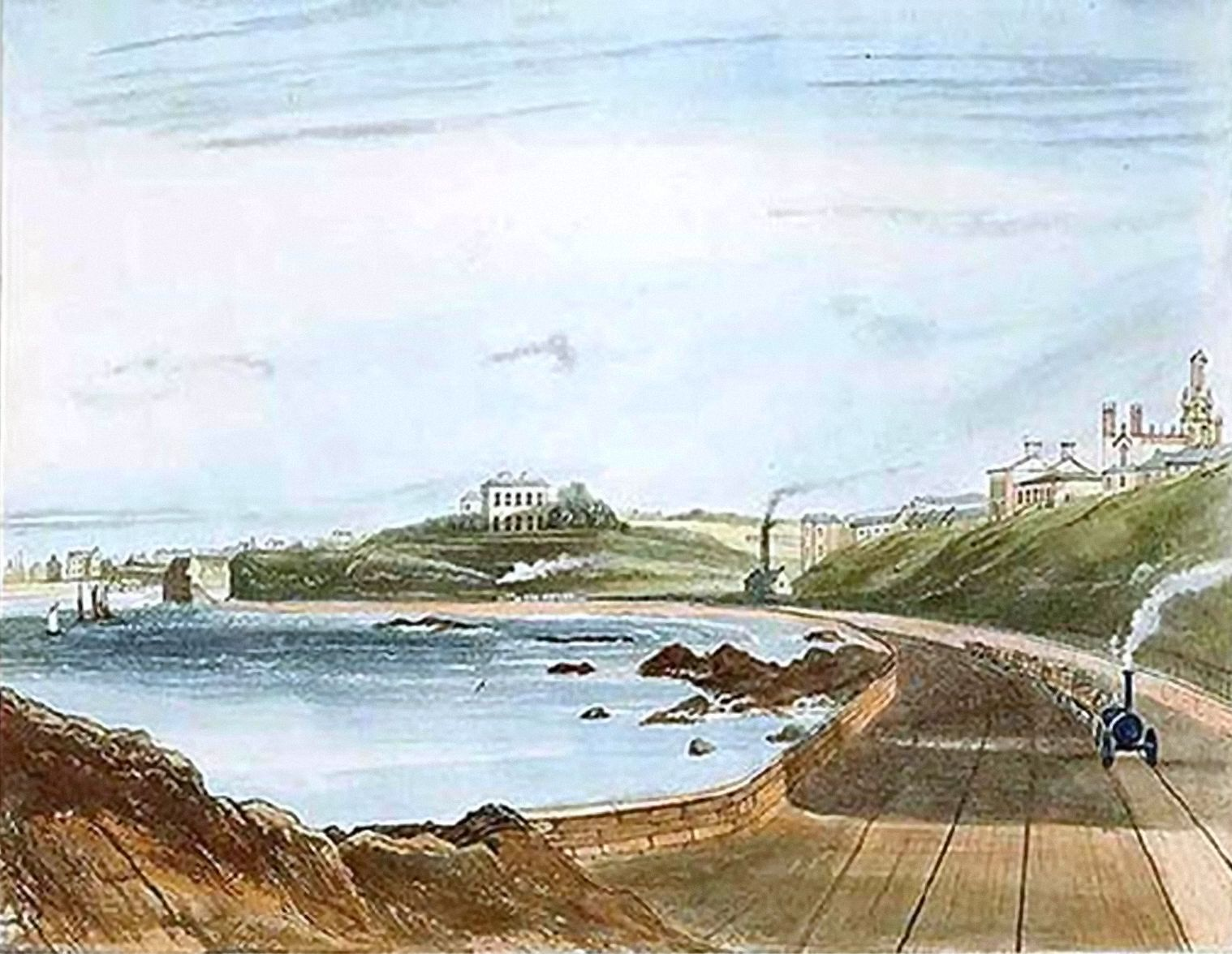
Seapoint in 1834 viewed from the Martello Tower towards Salthill and Old Dunleary, the railway line was new, having just been built a few years earlier

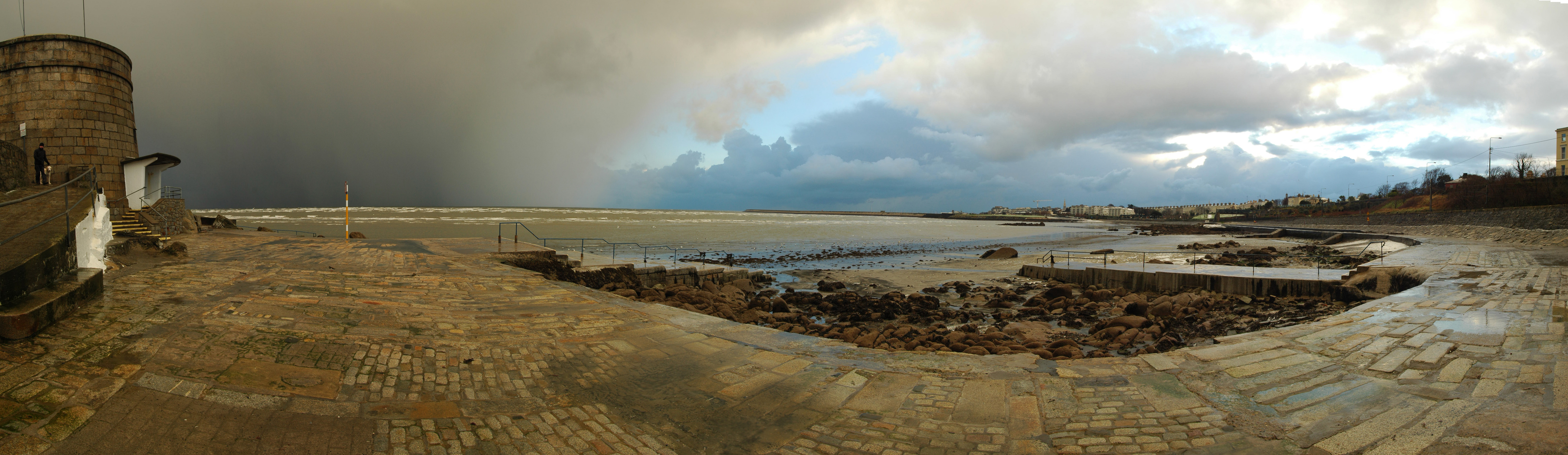
Panorama photograph of Seapoint in Monkstown in February 2009

Seapoint (Irish: Rinn na Mara) is a small seafront area between Blackrock and Monkstown in Dublin in the Dún Laoghaire–Rathdown area. It is best known for its beach and bathing areas, beside a Martello Tower on the Dublin Bay seashore. The beach currently has an International Blue flag award and a national Green flag award.

The Martello Tower is now the headquarters of the Genealogical Society of Ireland.

The route linking Dún Laoghaire harbour to the N11 National primary route has itself been designated a National primary route, the N31. Part of the route includes Seapoint Avenue, and the Seapoint area is located on the strip of land, which includes the railway line, between the road and the sea.

== Seapoint Boat Club ==
In 1924, Michael Mahony of Dun Laoghaire built six B.R.A. 12 ft. dinghies which became the core of the sailing club which survived for about 10 years.

== See also ==
- Seapoint railway station
