= Anticipate Recordings =

American independent record label

- Founder: Ezekiel Honig
- Distributor: Kompakt
- Genre: Ambient, experimental, techno
- Country of origin: U.S.
- Location: New York City
- Official website: anticipaterecordings.com

Anticipate Recordings is an independent record label based in Manhattan founded by electronic music producer and performer Ezekiel Honig. Anticipate combines elements of electro-acoustics, ambient, slow motion techno, and found house with traces of filtered influences ranging from jazz, post rock, classical, dub, musique concrète, and minimalism.

== Artists ==
- Ezekiel Honig (United States)
- Sebastian Meissner a.k.a. Klimek (Germany)
- aAron Munson (Canada)
- Joshue Ott (United States)
- Morgan Packard (United States)
- Nicola Ratti (Italy)
- Sawako (Japan)
- Mark Templeton (Canada)

== Catalog ==
- ANT-001 - Mark Templeton - Standing on a Hummingbird (February 19, 2007)
- ANT-002 - Morgan Packard - Airships Fill the Sky CD + Morgan Packard & Joshue Ott Unsimulatable DVD (July 2, 2007)
- ANT-003 - Sawako - Madoromi (October 15, 2007)
- ANT-004 - Klimek - Dedications (November 12, 2007)
- ANT-004A - Klimek - Dedications Limited Edition EP (November 12, 2007)
- ANT-005 - Nicola Ratti - From the Desert Came Saltwater (May 26, 2008)
- ANT-006 - Ezekiel Honig - Surfaces of a Broken Marching Band (October 27, 2008)
- ANT-006A - Ezekiel Honig - Porchside Past Tense 7" vinyl (December 14, 2008)
- ANT-007 - Mark Templeton - Inland (May 11, 2009)
- ANT-007A - Mark Templeton - Sea Point 12" vinyl (August 17, 2009)
- ANT-008 - Klimek - Movies is Magic (October 12, 2009)
- ANT-009 - Mark Templeton & aAron Munson - Acre Loss CD+DVD (February 2, 2009)
