= Sea Point (EP) =

EP 12" Vinyl by Mark Templeton
- Released: August 17, 2009
- Genre: Ambient, electronic
- Length: 22:41
- Label: Anticipate Recordings

Mark Templeton chronology
Inland (2009)	Sea Point (2009)

Sea Point is a limited edition 12" vinyl released by Anticipate Recordings that includes three tracks from Mark Templeton's Inland release along with three additional tracks. The 12" vinyl was released on August 17, 2009.

== Track listing ==
A1."Beginnings"–3:03
A2."Sleep In Front Of"–5:13
A3."At Your Feet"–3:48

B1."Telepathy"–2:49
B2."Increasing By Numbers"–4:18
B3."Traditional Instruments"–3:30
