= Go-Ahead Ireland =

Irish bus operator

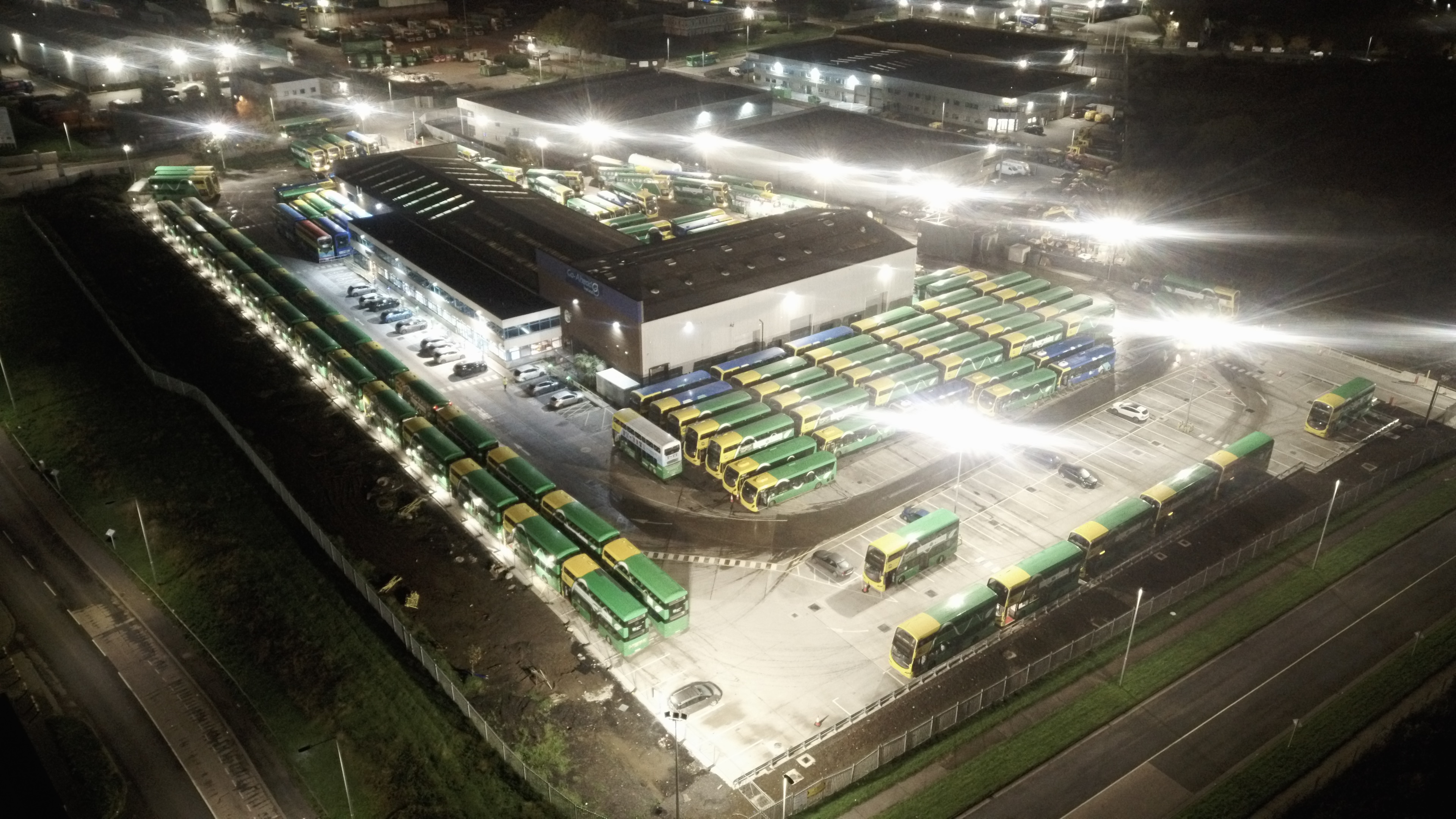
- Go-Ahead Ireland Ballymount Depot at Night
- Parent: Go-Ahead Group
- Founded: 9 September 2018; 8 years ago
- Headquarters: Ballymount, Dublin
- Service area: Dublin, Kildare, Wicklow
- Service type: Public Transport Operator
- Routes: 43
- Depots: Ballymount, Naas, Ballycoolen
- Fleet: 284
- Website: www.goaheadireland.ie

Go-Ahead Transport Services (Dublin) Limited, trading as Go-Ahead Ireland, is a bus operator in Dublin that commenced trading in September 2018. It is a subsidiary of the Go-Ahead Group.

== History ==
With the aim of improving efficiency, in 2015 the National Transport Authority put the operation of 24 Dublin Bus routes out to tender. In August 2017 the contract was awarded to the Go-Ahead Group. This represented 10% of the incumbent operator Dublin Bus existing monopoly operated network.

Go-Ahead Ireland commenced operating one new route, 175 from Citywest to University College Dublin, on 9 September 2018. A further four transferred from Dublin Bus on 7 October, then another three on 21 October, four on 2 December, nine on 20 January 2019 and a final three transferred on 24 March 2019. By this time the fleet had grown to 125 buses after taking over all the services that the company was scheduled to commence operation on. The contract is for five years with an option for a two-year extension.

On 26 July 2019 a second depot was opened in Naas in County Kildare. This depot is being used to manage a number of Dublin commuter coach routes which the company won the tender to operate, formerly operated by Bus Éireann, which were transferred to Go-Ahead between December 2019 and January 2020.

By 2022, the National Transport Authority indicated that it was not satisfied with Go-Ahead's performance, but extended the contract to October 2024 on the basis that it would be too disruptive to bus services to re-tender the contract. Go-Ahead has been penalised by the National Transport Authority for failing to meet minimum performance standards in 2019, 2021, 2022, 2023 and 2024.

== Routes ==
=== Dublin routes ===
Route	Origin	Destination	Notes	Start Date
33A	Skerries or Balbriggan	Dublin Airport or Swords	Services operate as either Skerries-Dublin Airport or Balbriggan-Swords.	2 December 2018
33B	Portrane	Swords		2 December 2018
45A	Dún Laoghaire Station	Kilmacanogue		7 October 2018
45B	Dún Laoghaire Station	Kilmacanogue	As route 45A, but via Shanganagh Cliffs Estate. Once a day in each direction.	7 October 2018
59	Dún Laoghaire Station	Killiney		7 October 2018
73	Kilnamanagh Road	Griffith Avenue East	Former Dublin Bus route 123, introduced during Phase 7 of the BusConnects programme.	19 October 2025
102	Sutton Station	Dublin Airport		2 December 2018
104	Dublin City University	Clontarf Road Station		20 January 2019
111	Dalkey	Brides Glen Luas stop		21 October 2018
114	Ticknock	Blackrock Station		20 January 2019
161	Dundrum Luas stop	Rockbrook		20 January 2019
220	Dublin City University	Mulhuddart		20 January 2019
220A	Dublin City University	Mulhuddart	As route 220, but via Coolmine. Once a day in each direction.	20 January 2019
236	Blanchardstown Centre	Damastown		20 January 2019
236A	Blanchardstown Centre	Damastown		20 January 2019
238	Tyrrelstown	Mulhuddart		20 January 2019
270	Blanchardstown Centre	Dunboyne		20 January 2019
L1	Bray Station	Newtown Mount Kennedy	Former route 184, introduced during Phase 6a of the BusConnects programme.	26 January 2025
L2	Bray Station	Newcastle	Former route 184, introduced during Phase 6a of the BusConnects programme.	26 January 2025
L3	North Delgany	Glenbrook Park	Introduced during Phase 6a of the BusConnects programme.	26 January 2025
L15	Bray Station	Enniskerry Golf Club	Former route 185, introduced during Phase 6a of the BusConnects programme.	26 January 2025
L26	Blackrock Station	Kilternan	Former routes 63 and 84, introduced during Phase 6a of the BusConnects programme.	26 January 2025
L27	Dún Laoghaire Station	Leopardstown Valley	Former route 63, introduced during Phase 6a of the BusConnects programme.	26 January 2025
L51	Adamstown Station	Liffey Valley	Former route 239, introduced during Phase 2 of the BusConnects programme.	28 November 2021
L52	Blanchardstown Centre	Adamstown Station	Former route 239, introduced during Phase 2 of the BusConnects programme.	28 November 2021
L55	Palmerstown Village	Chapelizod	Introduced during Phase 5b of the BusConnects programme.	26 November 2023
N2	Heuston Station	Clontarf Road Station	Introduced during Phase 6a of the BusConnects programme.	29 September 2024
N6	Kilbarrack	Finglas	Former route 17A, introduced during Phase 3 of the BusConnects programme.	29 May 2022
S4	Liffey Valley Shopping Centre	UCD	Introduced during Phase 5b of the BusConnects programme.	26 November 2023
S6	Tallaght	Blackrock Station	Introduced during Phase 5b of the BusConnects programme.	26 November 2023
S8	Citywest	Dún Laoghaire Station	Introduced during Phase 5b of the BusConnects programme.	26 November 2023
W2	The Square Tallaght	Liffey Valley Shopping Centre	Introduced during Phase 5b of the BusConnects programme.	26 November 2023
W4	The Square Tallaght	Blanchardstown Centre	Introduced during Phase 5a of the BusConnects programme.	25 June 2023
W6	Maynooth (Community College)	The Square Tallaght	Replaced placeholder routes W61 and W62.	24 November 2024

=== Dublin Commuter routes ===
Go-Ahead Ireland took over the operation of a further six routes from Dublin to counties Offaly, Laois, Kildare and Meath from Bus Éireann between December 2019 and January 2020. These are the 120, 120C, 123, 124, 126 and the 130. They started operating the 126 and 130 on 1 December 2019 which coincided with the introduction of new route 125 from Newbridge, County Kildare to UCD. They took over the 120 and 120C on 19 January 2020.

=== Route 197 ===
On 24 November 2019, Go-Ahead Ireland started operating route 197. This route is part of a separate contract with the NTA. It uses Alexander Dennis Enviro 200MMCs owned by Go-Ahead rather than the NTA as is the case on the Dublin city and commuter routes.

== Fleet ==
Go-Ahead Ireland commenced operations with nine buses. By the time it took over its final routes from Dublin Bus in early 2019, the fleet was scheduled to expand to 125 buses comprising

- 24 new Wright Gemini 3 bodied Volvo B5TLs and
- 40 Wright StreetLites, with
- 12 Wright Gemini 2 bodied Volvo B9TLs and
- 49 Wright Gemini 3 bodied Volvo B5TLs to transfer from Dublin Bus.

It was later decided that an extra 12 double decker buses were required in order to be able to fulfill the full quantity of routes due to transfer. These buses were diverted from an order of Wright Gemini 3 Volvo B5TL buses originally meant for Dublin Bus bringing the fleet up to 133 buses.

In 2022 Go-Ahead Ireland received 3 more Wright Gemini 3 Volvo B5TL buses from Dublin Bus and were numbered 11601 to 11603. These were former SG272, SG273 and SG275 of Dublin Bus Broadstone Depot.

Go-Ahead Ireland use five digit and six digit numbers for fleet numbering with their

- 179 B5TLs being numbered from 11501 to 11593 and 11601 to 11657,
- 12 B9TLs are numbered from 11901 to 11912 and the
- 40 Streetlites are numbered between 12101 and 12140.
- 9 former Dublin Bus AX class Volvo B7TL buses with Alexander ALX400 bodywork have been added to the fleet as additional buses. These were numbered 11701 to 11709 and were new to Dublin Bus as AX497 to AX505. Ten Mercedes-Benz Citaros and five Wright Gemini bodied Volvo B7TLs were transferred from Oxford Bus Company and Go-Ahead London as driver trainers. In March 2022 they received 3 former B5LH Wright Gemini 2 vehicles from Go-Ahead London also for driver training. These are numbered 8501 to 8503. In 2022 Go-Ahead took delivery of 3 Wright Streetlite's numbered 12141 to 12143. These vehicles are formerly owned by Metrobus in the UK and have replaced Enviro200MMC's numbered 2701 to 2703 on route 197 between Ashbourne and Swords. The 3 Enviro200MMC's were sold to Metrobus in exchange for the Streetlites.

The Dublin Commuter routes are operated by a mixture of double deck VDL Futura coaches and Sunsundegui SB3 bodied Volvo B8R interurban buses.

Go-Ahead Ireland's Dublin City fleet is managed from its primary depot on the site of a former DHL Express and JCB Retailer depot in Ballymount. A second depot in Naas where the Commuter routes are based opened on 26 July 2019.

In August 2020 Go-Ahead Ireland began operation of 8 new routes in North and West County Dublin. The fleet they use on these routes are nine ex-Dublin Bus 2006 ALX400 class buses formerly AX497-505 now they are numbered 11701–11709. They are currently operating on route 33S,102A/C/P/S,220S,236S&270S

Go-Ahead Ireland officially opened a new bus depot in Ballycoolin, Dublin 15, on August 7, 2026, serving as the central base for Go-Ahead Ireland North side bus services across the Greater Dublin Area as part of a major National Transport Authority (NTA) contract expansion aiming to support growing passenger numbers and a total of 72 regional routes. Built to house and manage up to 187 buses and can be scaled up to accommodate between 400 and 450 jobs, including roles for drivers, mechanics, and support staff

== See also ==
- BusConnects
