= Mark Templeton (electronic musician) =

Canadian experimental electronic artist

- Born: 1976 (age 49–50)
- Origin: Edmonton, Alberta
- Genres: Electronic, ambient, sound collage
- Labels: Anticipate Recordings, Staalplaat, Sweat Lodge Guru, Under The Spire, Graphical, Senufo Editions, SUPERPANG, enmossed, Faitiche

Mark Templeton (born 1976) is a Canadian experimental electronic artist. Templeton's works are released by New York City record label Anticipate Recordings.

== Background ==
Templeton utilizes acoustic instruments, found sounds and sampled material to construct textured, collage-like electronic compositions His style has been called 'glitchy', but also 'painterly', in an attempt to describe his deconstruction and crumbling of instruments' traditional voices.

His works have been commissioned by organizations of contemporary dance, film and audiovisual disciplines. Collaborations with experimental filmmakers aAron Munson and Kyle Armstrong and sound artists Nicola Ratti and Ezekiel Honig have produced numerous works on various formats.

Templeton has performed at international festivals and alternative spaces such as MUTEK (Montreal), Unsound Festival (Kraków), send+receive: a festival of sound (Winnipeg), Eat This Festival (Utrecht), Galapagos (New York), Latitude 53 (Edmonton) and Suoni Per Il Popolo Festival (Montreal).

== Discography ==
- Fields Awake (2005, Independent) [CD+DVD]
- Frail as Breath (2005, Independent/Robotopera)
- Standing on a Hummingbird (2007, Anticipate Recordings)
- Acre Loss (2009, Anticipate Recordings) [CD+DVD]
- Inland (2009, Anticipate Recordings)
- Sea Point (2009, Anticipate Recordings) [12" vinyl]
- Ballads (2010, Independent)
- Scotch Heart (2011, Sweat Lodge Guru) [cassette]
- Mark Templeton Mort Aux Vaches (2011, Staalplaat)
- Jealous Heart (2013, Under the Spire) [12" vinyl]
- EXTENSIONS (2015, Graphical) [12" vinyl+DVD]
- Gentle Heart (2017, Graphical) [12" vinyl]
- Distorted Tourist (2018, Graphical) [photobook+five one-sided flexi disc records]
- Ocean Front Property (2020, Senufo Editions) [CD]
- Ocean Front Property (2021, The Ice Plant and Graphical) [photobook+limited edition cassette]
- Western Sunset (2021, SUPERPANG) [digital]
- Office Swan (2021, Granny Records) [cassette]
- Inner Light (2024, enmossed) [cassette]
- Two Verses (2024, Faitiche) [12" vinyl]
