= Acre Loss =

Soundtrack album by Mark Templeton and aAron Munson
- Released: February 2009
- Genres: Ambient, electronic
- Length: 39:20
- Label: Anticipate Recordings

Acre Loss is a collaboration project between electronic musician Mark Templeton and filmmaker aAron Munson. Released in 2009 by Anticipate Recordings, Acre Loss explores the artists' feelings of attachment to the land from which they came and will leave behind. This is a CD/DVD set with ten musical compositions accompanied by ten short films shot in Alberta, Canada. The artist collaboration was made possible through funding from the Edmonton Cultural Capital Explorations Grant program, in which each artist attempted to mentor the other in his craft.

== Track listing ==
1. "aTest" – 3:05
2. "this will pass" – 5:25
3. "saw to the seed" – 3:34
4. "too small" – 1:03
5. "contents are" –2:35
6. "1 is to one as..." – 4:23
7. "safer" – 4:27
8. "it's ok to fall" – 3:56
9. "small one" – 0:47
10. "looking Northward" – 10:05

== Personnel ==
- Harris Newman – mastering
- Mark Templeton – synthesizer, banjo, bass, guitar, percussion, accordion, voices, computers, video, field recording, effects pedals

Professional ratings
Review scores
Source	Rating
Allmusic	3/5 stars
