= Cork Kent railway station =

Railway station in Cork, Ireland

Kent Station Stáisiún Cheannt
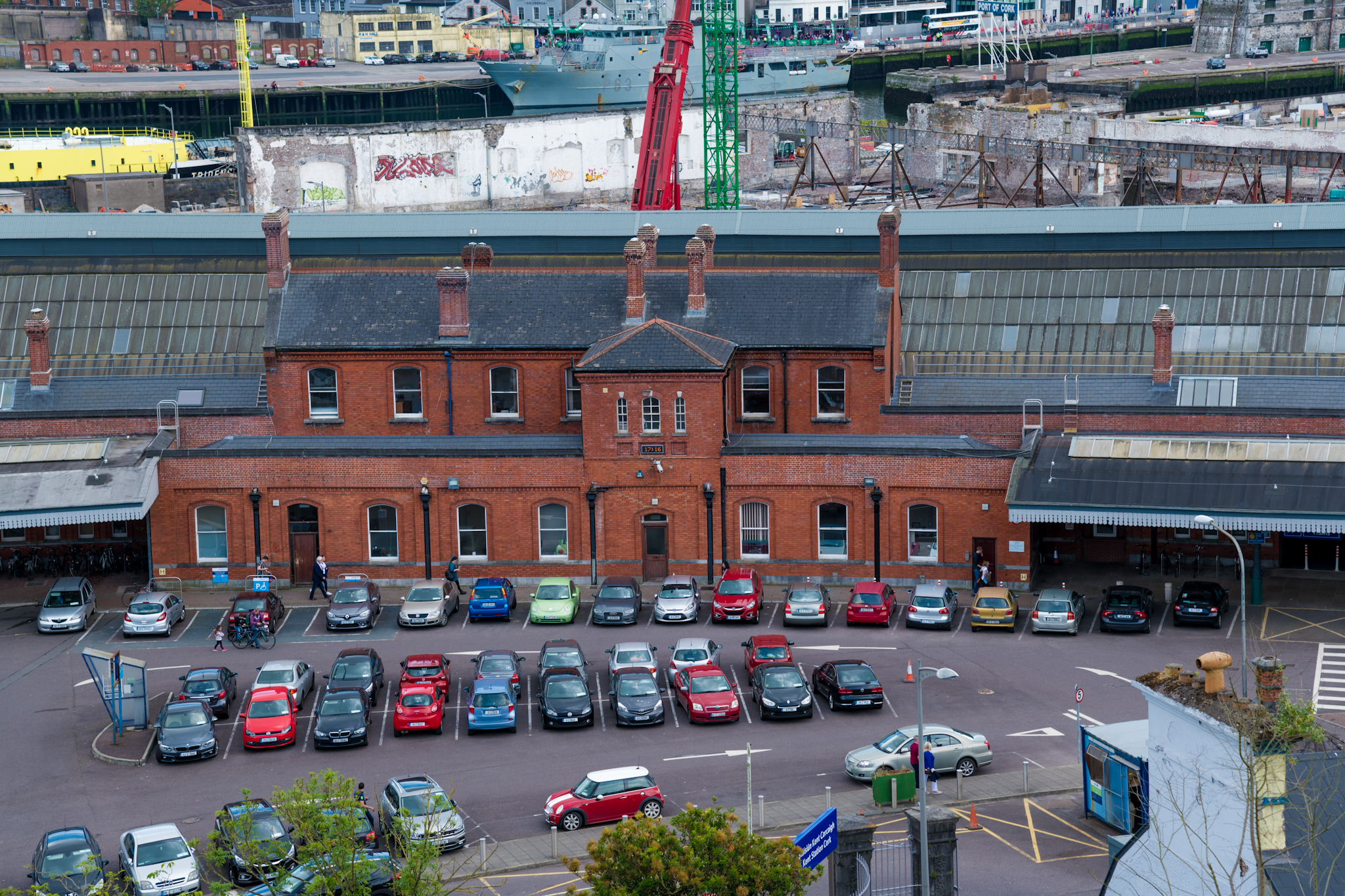
- Kent Station, as seen in 2019

General information
- Location: Lower Glanmire Road, Cork; Ireland
- Coordinates: 51.901786°N 8.458829°W
- Owner: Iarnród Éireann
- Lines: Dublin–Cork railway line Mallow–Tralee railway line
- Platforms: 6
- Bus operators: Barrys Coaches; Bus Éireann
- Connections: 31; 205; 210; 212; 214; 225; 226; 240; 241; 245; 260; 261

Construction
- Structure type: At-grade

Other information
- Station code: 30

History
- Opened: 1893
- Former names: Glanmire Road

Key dates
- 1966: Renamed to Kent Station

Services
| Preceding station | Iarnród Éireann | Following station |
|---|---|---|
| Mallow towards Dublin Heuston | InterCity Dublin–Cork | Terminus |
| Mallow towards Tralee | InterCity Cork–Tralee | Terminus |
| Mallow Terminus | Commuter Cork–Mallow | Terminus |
| Terminus | Commuter Cork–Cobh | Little Island towards Cobh |
| Terminus | Commuter Cork–Midleton | Little Island towards Midleton |
Location

Kent Station (Irish: Stáisiún Cheannt) is an Iarnród Éireann railway station in Cork, Ireland. Originally opened in 1893, the station operates as a hub for Intercity services to Dublin and Tralee and commuter services to Mallow, Cobh and Midleton. In 2016, Kent Station was the fifth busiest station in the Republic of Ireland, as well as the busiest outside of Dublin.

== Background ==
=== Name ===
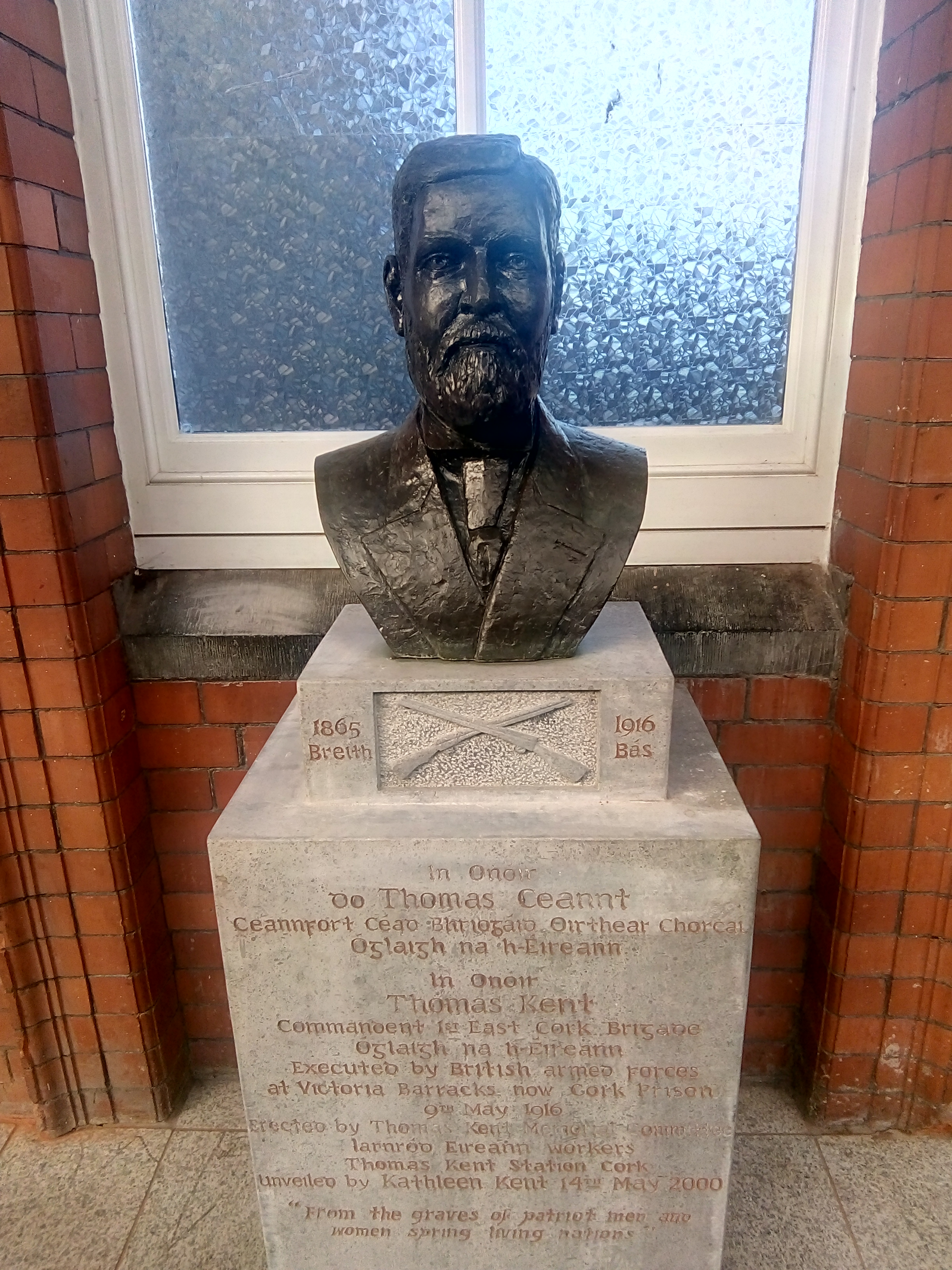
Bust of Thomas Kent at the station, by sculptor James MacCarthy

The station was originally called Glanmire Road Station, but was renamed after Thomas Kent in 1966 on the 50th anniversary of the Easter Rising.

=== History ===
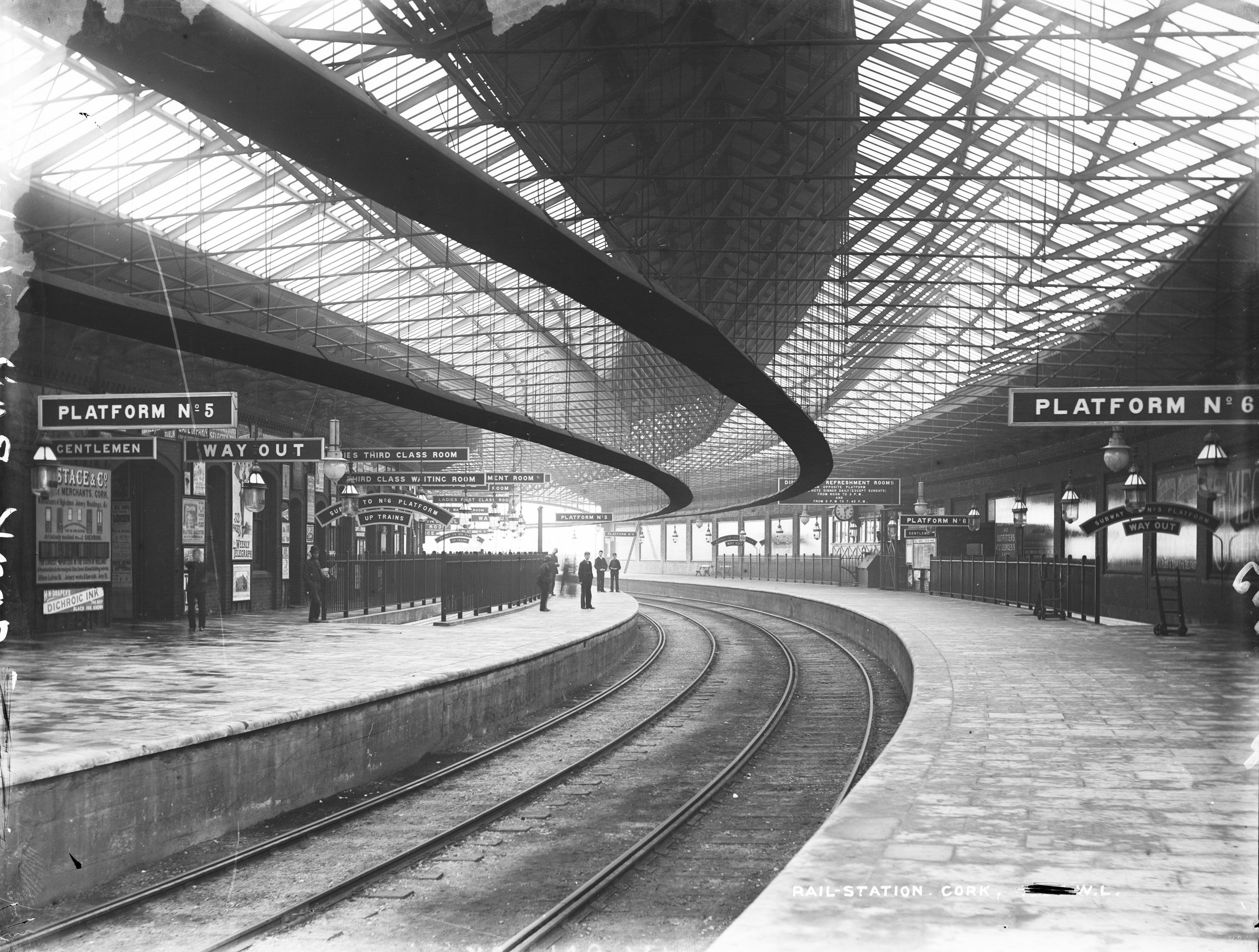
The station, ca. 1893.

The station opened on 2 February 1893 and the current building was built in the same year. The station replaced two earlier stations that served as separate termini for the Great Southern and Western Railway (GS&WR) and Cork & Youghal Railway (C&Y). The original GS&WR station, Penrose Quay, was located directly in front of the portal of the Cork railway tunnel through which the railway into Cork passed, while Cork Summerhill, the original C&Y terminus was above the tunnel portal. The purpose of the new station was to allow through running of trains after the 1865 takeover of the C&Y by the GS&WR. The station is the only one of the six Cork railway stations that still exists today.

The station served as a filming location for the 1979 movie The First Great Train Robbery starring Sean Connery, Donald Sutherland and Lesley-Anne Down.

On 24 February 2012, the station briefly shut due to a gas leak.

On 18 December 2013, the canopy over platforms 1 and 2 collapsed in high winds; there was damage to one train and one person suffered minor injuries. In February 2014, €2.8 million was allocated to repair the canopy.

=== Site improvements ===
Planning permission was granted by Cork City Council in July 2013 for a new entrance building onto Horgan's Quay and a new bi-directional road linking Railway Street/Alfred Street and Horgan's Quay. The plan also included bus shelters, a car park with 140 spaces and a set-down area accessed from Horgan's Quay for taxis and buses. In February 2014, €3 million was allocated towards implementing phase one including site works and detailed planning. Work began in summer 2014.

In September 2014, Irish Rail submitted a new application for two rather than one entrance building onto the quayside. Planning permission was granted, and Irish Rail put the entrance building project out to tender in early 2015. Construction commenced in summer 2015, and was expected to complete in approximately 12 months. However, works took longer and the entrances were officially opened in November 2017. In parallel, a new road project (for use by buses), commenced in early 2016 with its opening coinciding with the completion of the entrance building contract in November 2017. Bus Éireann now carries passengers from the new entrance to the city centre and beyond.

In late 2023, construction started on a new platform to enable through-running. It was slated to open in 2024, but opened in April 2025 as part of a Cork railway upgrade.

=== Engine no. 36 ===
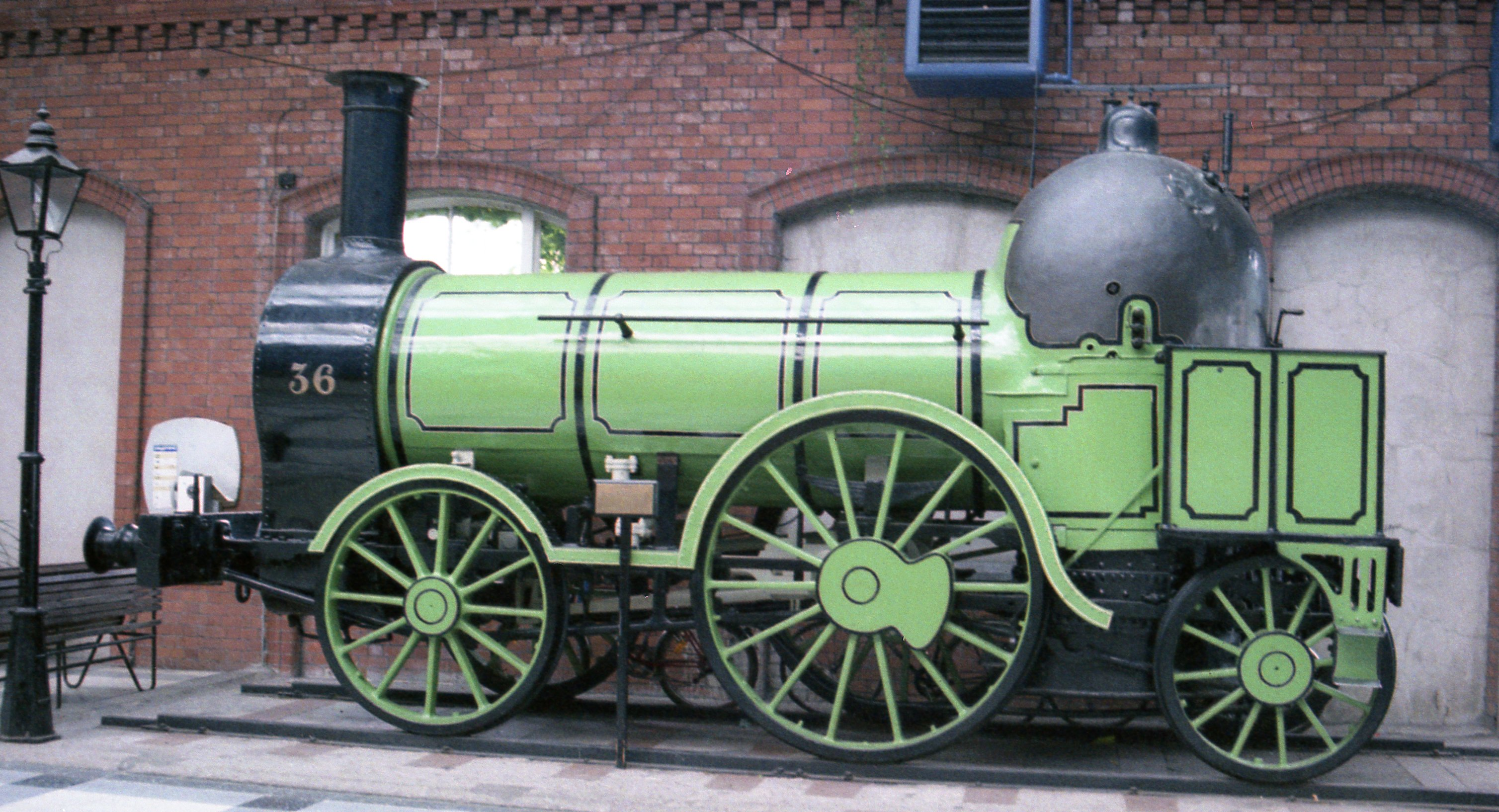
Engine No. 36

GS&WR Class 21 No. 36 has been on permanent display at the station since 1950. "Engine No. 36" dates from 1847 and is on display on a viewing platform in the booking hall. It was restored and moved to its current position by Iarnród Éireann in 2007.

Originally built by Bury, Curtis, and Kennedy of Liverpool at a cost of £1,955, the engine was obtained by the Great Southern and Western Railway to run services from Dublin to Cork. It has a 2-2-2 wheel arrangement, and remained in service until 1874. The engine was displayed at the Cork International Exhibition in 1902, the Railway Centenary Exhibition in 1925, and the bi-centenary of the Royal Dublin Society at Ballsbridge in 1930.

== Train Services ==
The station offers direct intercity rail services to Heuston Station and stations in County Kerry such as Killarney, Farranfore (for Kerry Airport) and Tralee. Cork Suburban Rail services follow the Cobh and Mallow lines. Since July 2009, a commuter line also operates to Midleton.

The station has three terminating platforms, numbered 1 to 3 (in the Cobh direction), and three through platforms, numbered 4, 5 and 6. The platforms not directly accessible from the station concourse, platforms 5 & 6, are accessed through a subway, unlike most other Irish stations, which use footbridges. Until the mid-1990s, the platforms 4 and 5 were numbered 5 and 6, as there had been a fourth terminating platform adjacent to platform 3; it was removed in 1984.

Since December 2005's timetable change, the through platforms tend to get quite congested as commuter trains often come in together, clogging up limited space. Since the reopening of the Cork & Youghal Railway as far as Midleton, increased use has been made of the terminating platforms 1 to 3. There is also a loop line behind platform 5, which used to be used to facilitate moving locomotives from the end of arriving trains to the other end in preparation for departure. This line used to be a double-tracked freight, avoiding the line that enabled goods trains to bypass the passenger station. It is no longer necessary since all services to the station are operated either by railcars or by Mark 4 sets with a driving van trailer.

In 2017, the Cork to Dublin reached record usage of 3.15 million passengers, up 6.5% from 2016.

== Bus services ==
As of May 2017, three Bus Éireann services use Kent Station as a terminus:

- 205: Kent Station – Cork City Centre – University College Cork – Munster Technological University
- 226: Kent Station – Parnell Place Bus Station – Cork Airport – Kinsale
- 225: Kent Station – Parnell Place Bus Station – Cork Airport - Ballygarvan - Carrigaline - Haulbowline

Some other Bus Éireann services use a stop across from the station on Lower Glanmire Road, which is listed on timetables as "Lwr Glanmire Rd (Opp Kent Station)". These include:

- 241: Parnell Place Bus Station – Midleton – Whitegate – Trabolgan Holiday Village
- 260: Parnell Place Bus Station – Youghal – Ardmore

Parnell Place Bus Station is approximately a 750m walk from Kent Station.

== Gallery ==
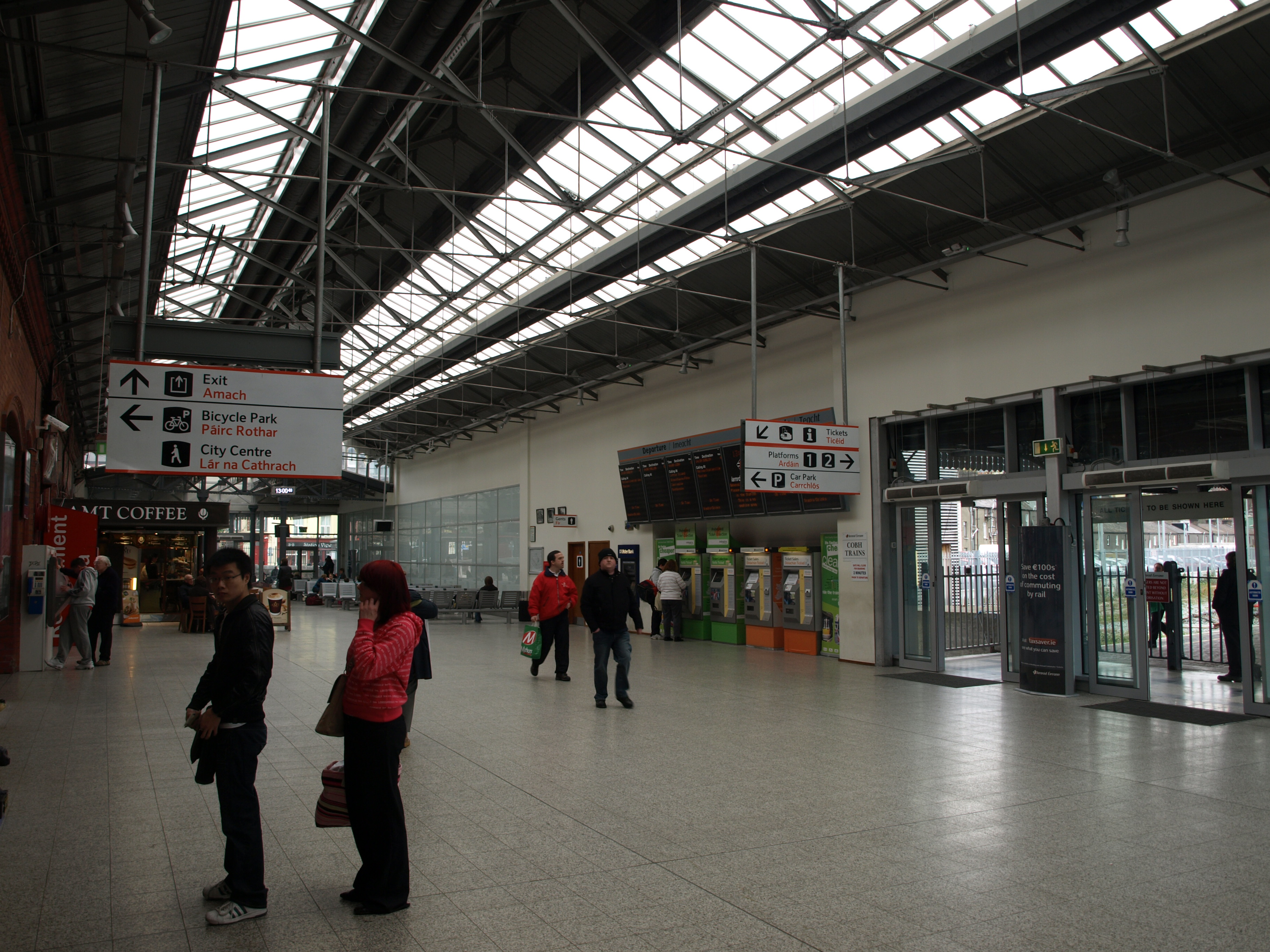
The booking hall

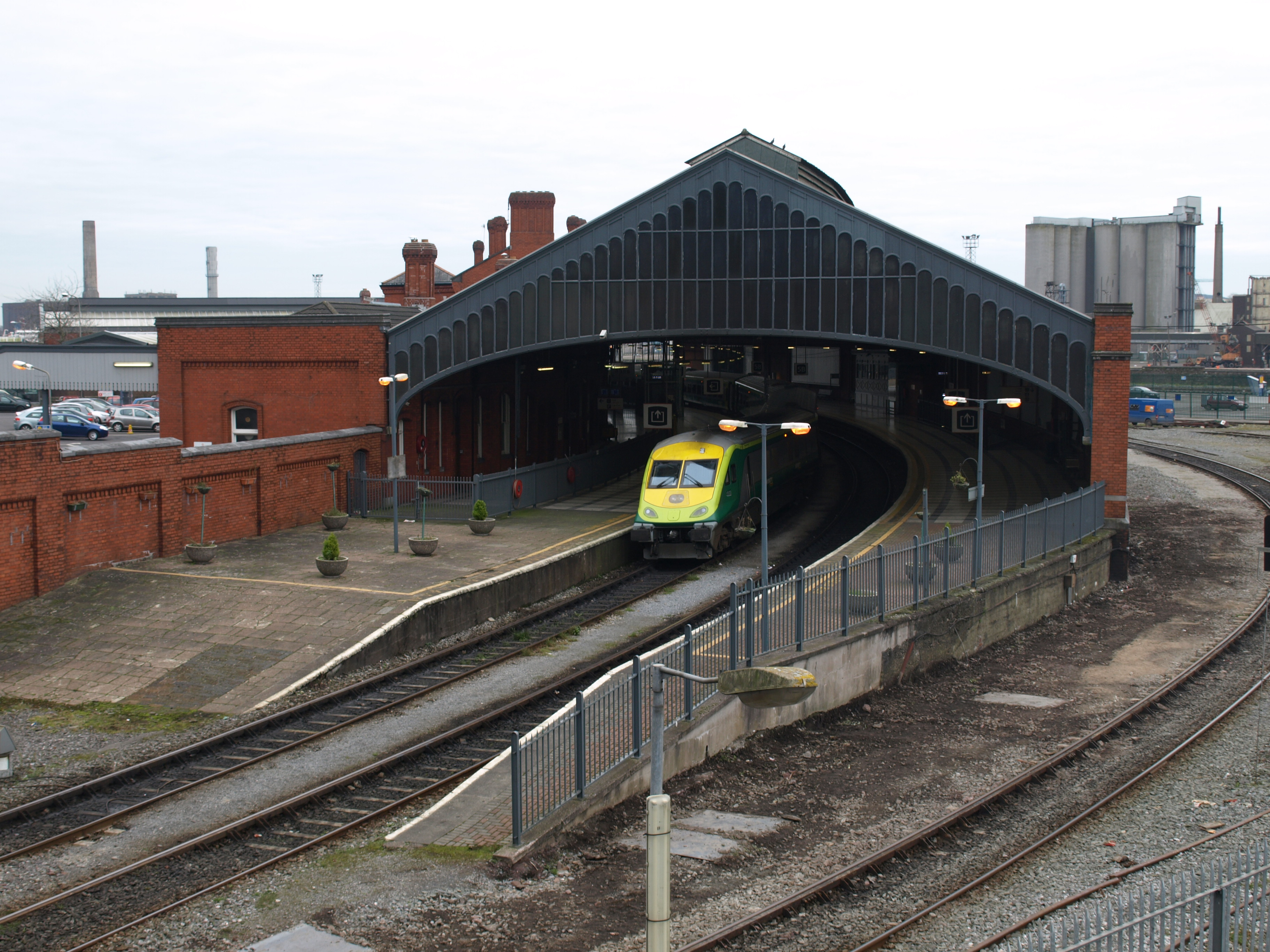
Main train shed

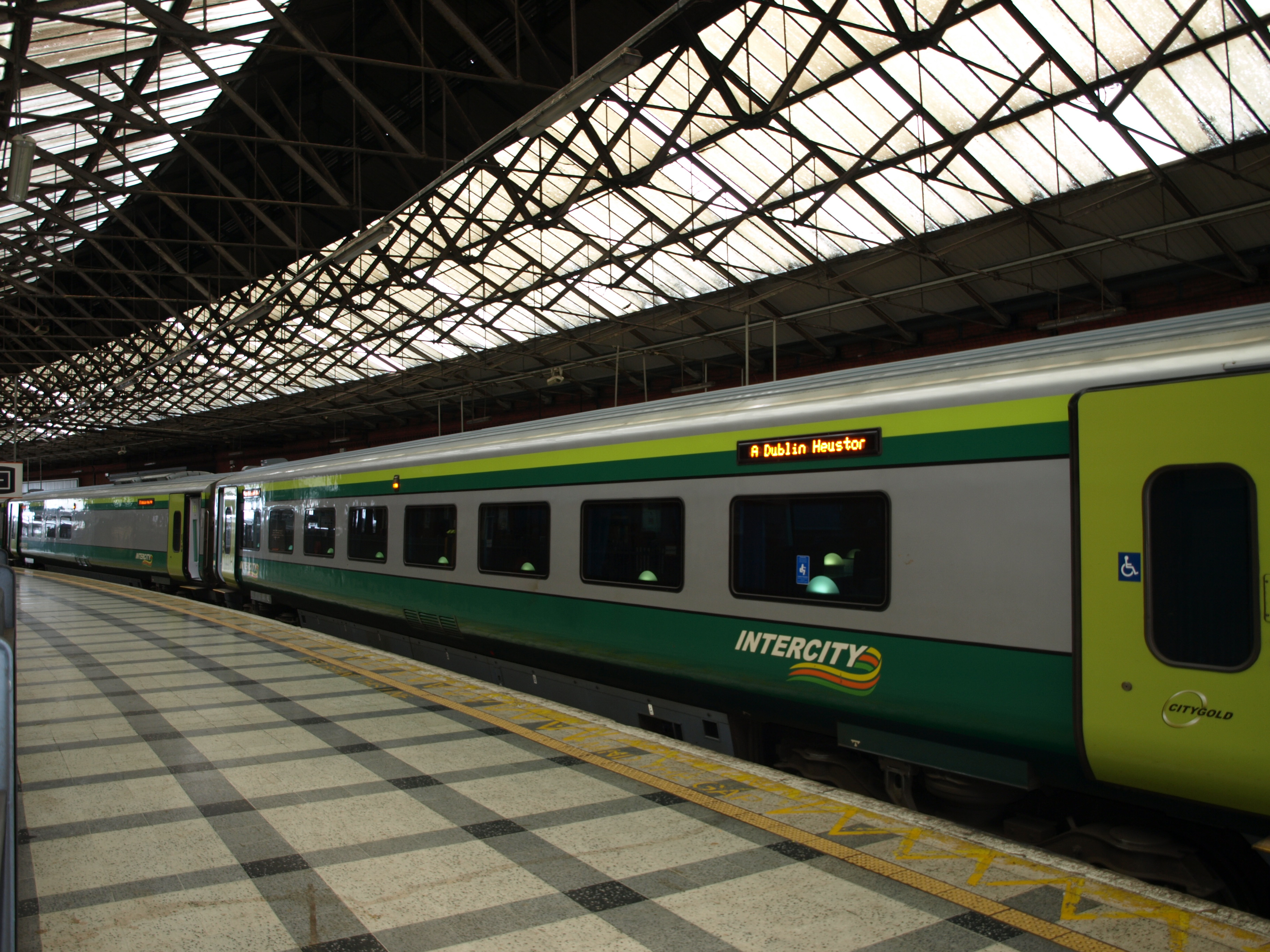
Dublin service waiting to depart

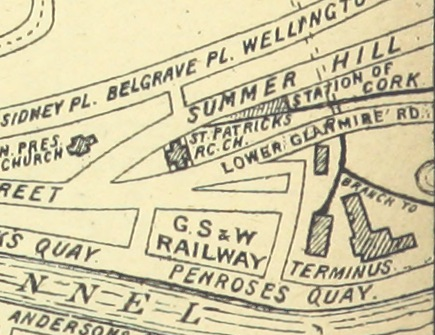
Earlier Penrose Quay & Summerhill stations

== See also ==
- List of railway stations in Ireland
- Proposed light rail developments for Cork City
