= Dublin–Cork railway line =

Transport link between Ireland's largest cities

Dublin–Cork Main Line
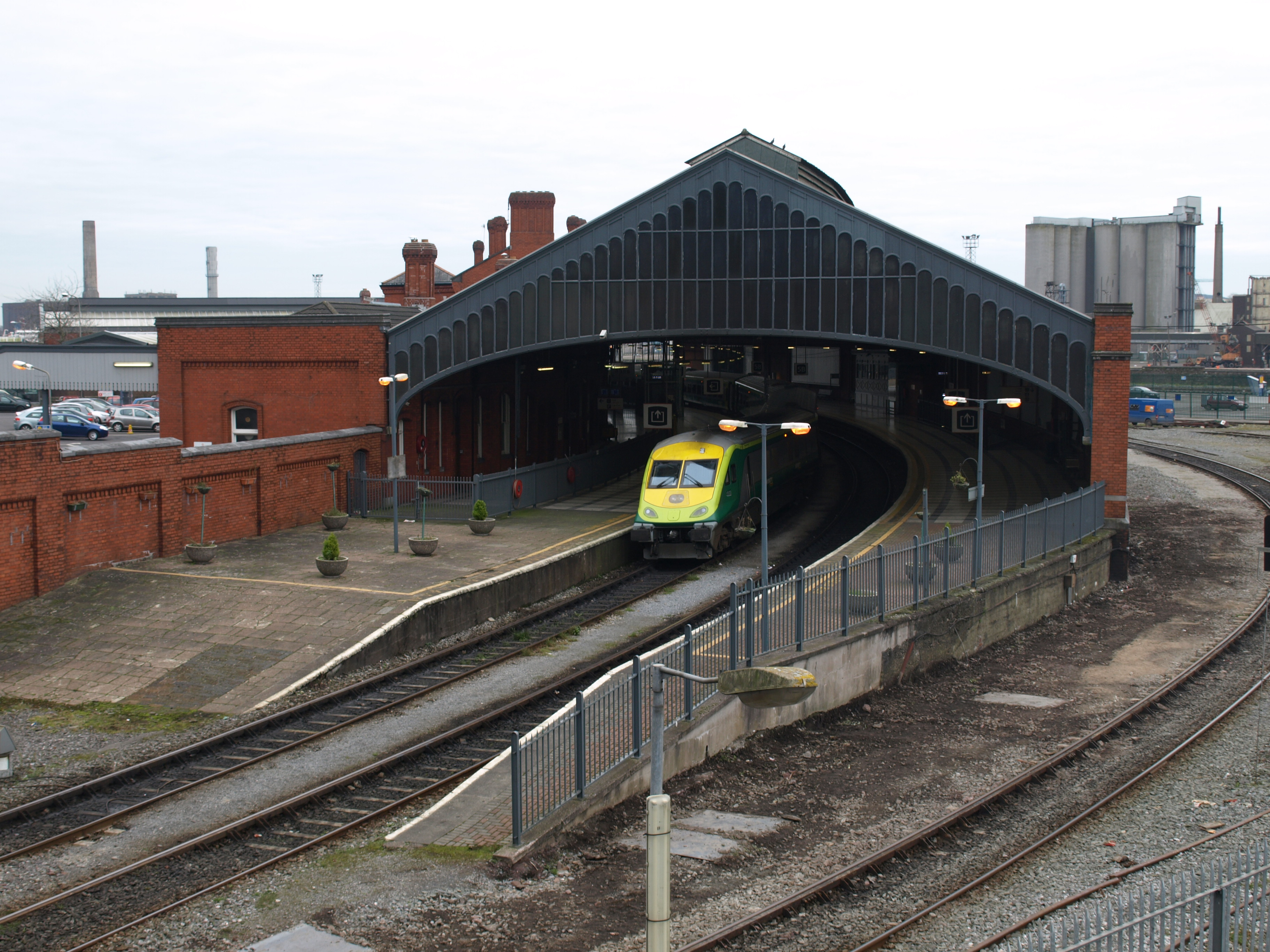
- Mark 4 InterCity at Cork Kent.

Overview
- Status: Operational
- Locale: Ireland
- Termini: Dublin Heuston; Cork Kent
- Stations: 18

Service
- Type: Commuter rail, Inter-city rail Heavy rail
- System: Iarnród Éireann
- Services: InterCity: Dublin–Cork; Dublin–Waterford; Dublin–Galway, Westport, Ballina; Dublin–Limerick; Dublin, Cork–Tralee; Commuter: South Western Commuter; Mallow–Cork
- Operator(s): Iarnród Éireann
- Rolling stock: 22000 Class (InterCity DMU); Mark 4 (InterCity Push/Pull)

History
- Opened: 1844

Technical
- Line length: 266.75 km (165.75 mi)
- Number of tracks: Double track
- Track gauge: 1,600 mm (5 ft 3 in) Irish gauge
- Electrification: None (proposed to Hazelhatch)
- Operating speed: 160 km/h (100 mph)
Route map
(Click to expand)

The Dublin–Cork Main Line is the main InterCity railway route in Ireland between Dublin Heuston and Cork Kent. In 2018, 3.46 million passengers travelled on the line, a 10% increase from 2017 figures.

== About ==
The line is one of the longest in Ireland at 266.75 kilometres (165.75 mi) and is used by both InterCity and Commuter services. Services to Waterford branch off at Cherryville Junction, after Kildare, and to Westport and Galway after Portarlington. Although there are some direct services to Limerick, most services require a change at either Limerick Junction or Ballybrophy (the latter traveling onward via the Limerick-Ballybrophy railway line). Services to Tralee via Killarney and Farranfore (for Kerry Airport) run from Mallow. Commuter services run on both the South Western Commuter line between Dublin and Kildare or Portlaoise, and Cork Commuter line between Mallow and Cobh.

Iarnród Éireann, the Irish state railway company, has invested heavily in improving the infrastructure and rolling stock. It has had both its track and signalling upgraded in the last few years thanks to funding from the government's National Development Plan - beginning in 1977, the line was upgraded to continuous welded rail, while the introduction of centralised traffic control means that signalling is controlled from a single location at Dublin Connolly station.

In 2006, the first of 67 new Mark 4 coaches were introduced on the route as part of a €117 million upgrade of rolling stock. These seven new 8-car sets provide an hourly service frequency between Dublin and Cork.

Although Dublin Heuston is the terminus, the line connects to Dublin Connolly via the Phoenix Park Tunnel. This route is used for both passenger and freight services, as well as rolling stock movements to the main Iarnród Éireann works at Inchicore, just south of Heuston. It is occasionally also used for special passenger services to Dublin Connolly, usually for Gaelic games events at Croke Park.

== History ==
Built by the Great Southern and Western Railway (GS&WR), it connects the largest and second largest cities in the state. It connects with lines to other destinations, including Galway, Waterford, Westport, Limerick and Tralee. Construction began after receiving assent in the Great Southern and Western Railway (Ireland) Act 1844 (7 & 8 Vict. c. c) to build a railway between Dublin and Cashel with a branch to Carlow in 1844, and the GS&WR opened the line from Kingsbridge Station (now Heuston Station, Dublin) to Carlow on 4 August 1846.

The company received permission to extend the line towards Cork and Limerick in the Great Southern and Western Railway (Ireland) (Extension to Cork and Limerick) Act 1845 (8 & 9 Vict. c. cxxiv), reaching the northern Cork suburbs at a temporary terminus in 1847, and would later reach the city centre following the completion of the Cork railway tunnel in 1855. Amalgamations between the GS&WR and other smaller railway companies in the south led to the line gaining connections to other population centres. A branch from Portarlington to Athlone was built to connect with the Midland Great Western Railway to Galway.

== Timetable ==
There are 14 daily services between Dublin Heuston - Cork Kent (Monday - Saturday) Departing hourly on the hour. There are 15 daily services between Cork Kent - Dublin Heuston (Monday - Friday) Departing hourly at 25-past-the-hour and 14 daily on Saturday. On Sundays there are 10 services between Cork Kent - Dublin Heuston. In 2015, a morning service started which ran non-stop from Cork-Dublin. This service departs Cork Kent at 06:15 AM and arrives at Dublin Heuston in 2 hours 15 minutes, at 08:30 AM. Since then, in an extra service from Cork to Dublin than Dublin to Cork the 21:00 train from Dublin is formed of a 3+4 car class 22000 train which splits in Cork to operate 2 services to Dublin. In 2016 Irish rail brought the 2 Mk4 sets that were out of service back into service which freed up some ICR sets.

== Upgrading project ==
The line has been progressively upgraded from the late 2000s onward, with work focusing on the removal of speed restrictions, and separation of main line traffic from commuter trains near Dublin. The objective is to increase the sections of line capable of 160 km/h (99 mph) operation and thus provide faster services to compete with the M8 motorway. Ultimately it is intended for trains to run non-stop from Cork to Dublin in two hours or less. This has resulted in major disruption and cancellations on many weekends and speed restrictions affecting the punctuality of trains. The following is a summary of the main works involved:

- Awbeg River bridge renewal: The railway crosses the Awbeg river near Charleville, County Cork. By the late 2000s this bridge in dire need of renewal, with a speed restriction of 40 km/h (25 mph). The bridge was replaced in 2011 at a cost of €1 million .
- Kildare Route Project: This involved increasing the number of tracks from 2 to 4 between Cherry Orchard & Hazelhatch. It also included The renewing of the two old tracks. There is now a Down Fast, Down Slow, Up Slow & Up Fast lines. This section was cleared for 160 km/h (100 mph) in November 2010. Project completed in March 2011.
- Limerick Junction Reconfiguration: Previously there was a 40 km/h (25 mph) speed limit through Limerick Junction. In 2011 the junction was resignallised, and new track laid. It also included the automation of Emly level-crossing gates where there was a limit of 130 km/h (81 mph) in a 160 km/h (100 mph) section. This allowed speed increases to 100 km/h (60 mph) and 160 km/h (100 mph) respectively through these areas.
- Relaying with 60 kg rail: All relaying on the Dublin/Cork line in the future will involve using the 60 kg rail. It is a much heavier rail giving a smoother ride in trains. The section between Portarlington and Portlaoise has been relayed with the 60 kg rail. Most of this section is now cleared for 160 km/h (100 mph). 60 kg rail is being laid on many other smaller sections on the line and this is continuing. Relaying commenced in 2011, starting from Sallins and working back towards Hazelhatch and Celbridge.
- Rehabilitation works: Rehabilitation works have been undertaken on some existing sections of track. This included excavation, renewing drainage, installing a geo-textile membrane, replacing broken sleepers and renewing side worn rails. This was carried out on the 40 km (25 mi) section between Newbridge and Portlaoise. Speeds have been restored to almost 160 km/h (100 mph).
- Lisduff Area Renewal: Where the line passes through Lisduff County Tipperary there is the quarry used for ballast for the railway. There are railway sidings leading off the main line into it which were in poor condition and were replaced in early 2012, following a brief line closure.
- Other Works: Other works now completed have been: Renewal of Track layout Sallins (2009); Renewal of Points & provision of faster turnouts, Cherryville (2010); Portarlington Rebuilding to increase line speed here from 50 km/h (30 mph) to 130 km/h (80 mph) (2008), Renewal of Signalling & Track, Portlaoise (2010) & Excavation of boggy area, Pile driving and track renewal, Ballybrophy (2009)

In September 2011, Iarnród Éireann received government funding of €1 million to continue the improvements on the Dublin – Portarlington section of this line later in 2011. In September 2011, Iarnród Éireann announced a €175 million major investment programme, designed to further accelerate upgrading works on InterCity Routes, In particular the Dublin - Cork line. Since 2012 further upgrading has taken place including the following:

- Sallins - Cherryville Realignments: In this section, in particular around the Curragh, there was much curvature in the line, resulting in an 130 km/h (80 mph) limit in these areas. This project has seen the Railway realigned through these areas to remove the curves & increase the speed limit to 160 km/h (100 mph). There was also relaying of track in this section. Project completed in 2016.
- Portlaoise - Limerick Junction Relaying: This long section of line formerly had a maximum speed of 145 km/h (90 mph), with slightly lower limits in spots. The majority of this section had works to the trackbed & Relaying to increase the speed to 160 km/h (100 mph). There was also an elimination of level crossings & upgrading of points nearer Limerick Junction. Project completed in 2016.

In 2015 further upgrade plans were announced. Iarnród Éireann chief executive David Franks outlined how ballast was to be renewed between Hazelhatch and Kildare, which was to allow 160 km/h (100 mph) running on the 80 km (50 mi) long stretch. Further upgrades such as the removal of level crossings and bridge replacements are expected to bring journey times from Cork to Dublin to under 2 hours.

=== Electrification ===
Although electrification of the entire line was proposed within Iarnród Éireann's 2030 Rail Network Strategy Review between 2020 and 2025, this did not occur. The company's Strategy 2027 only mentions electrification of the line as a "first phase of InterCity electrification" without giving any date. As part of the DART+ South West project, two "slow" tracks on this corridor between Heuston and Hazelhatch and Celbridge, used for commuter services, will be electrified, leaving the two fast tracks to be electrified at a later date.

=== High-speed rail proposal ===
In 2020 the Irish Government confirmed it will be launching a study into an approximately 500 km high-speed railway from Belfast via Dublin to Cork and Limerick, which could cost around €15 billion.

== See also ==
- Belfast-Dublin Main Line
- Cork Suburban Rail
