= GS&WR Class 90 =

Great Southern & Western Railway Class 90
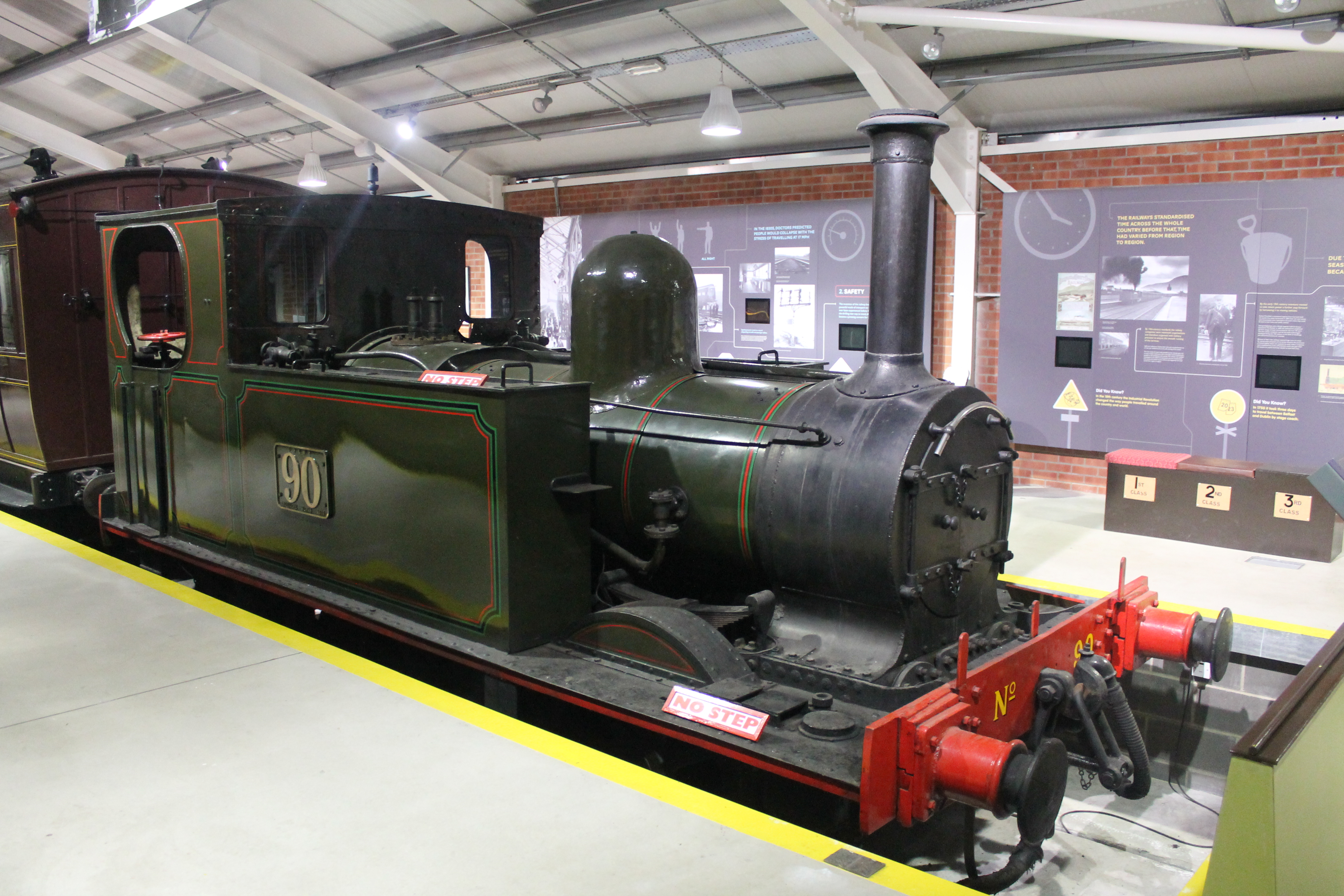
Type and origin
- Power type: Steam
- Builder: Inchicore Works
- Build date: 1875, 1890-1891
- Total produced: 3
Specifications
- Configuration
  - Whyte: 0-6-0T
  - UIC: C t
- Gauge: 5 ft 3 in (1,600 mm)
- Driver dia.: 3 ft 8 1/2 in (1.130 m)
- Axle load: 7 long tons 18 cwt (17,700 lb or 8 t)
- Loco weight: 23 long tons 8 cwt (52,400 lb or 23.8 t)
- Fuel type: Coal
- Firebox
  - Grate area: 10 sq ft (0.93 m^{2})
- Boiler pressure: 150 psi (1.03 MPa)
- Heating surface
  - Firebox: 52 sq ft (4.8 m^{2})
  - Tubes: 310 sq ft (29 m^{2})
- Cylinders: Two, inside
- Cylinder size: 10 in × 18 in (254 mm × 457 mm)
Performance figures
- Tractive effort: 5,160 lbf (22.95 kN)
Career
- Operators: GW&SR → GSR → CIÉ
- Class: GS&WR: 90; GSR/CIÉ: 90 or J30
- Locale: Ireland
- Withdrawn: 1930–1959
- Preserved: No. 90
- Disposition: One preserved, two scrapped

The Great Southern and Western Railway Class 90 is a class of 0-6-0T steam locomotive. They were one of the smallest steam locomotives to be inherited by the CIÉ on its formation.

== History ==
In 1875 Inchicore Works outshopped a railmotor for the Castleisland Railway. It was absorbed into GSWR stock in 1879, and numbered 90. Two similar examples numbered 91 and 92 respectively were built in 1881. 90 was sent to the Fermoy—Mitchelstown branch after being displaced by newer locomotives, but was impeded by its low fuel capacity, subsequently being rebuilt into a conventional tank locomotive in 1915.

In the 1890s the class was enlarged with the construction of Nos. 99 and 100. After the formation of Great Southern Railways, 90 and 100 were sent to work the Timoleague and Courtmacsherry Railway until displaced in 1954. From then on they were used as shunters on the Cork City Railways.

Both 90 and 100 were withdrawn with the arrival of the CIÉ 201 Class diesels, but 90 was brought back into service in 1960 to be a station pilot at Glanmire Road station for a year until final withdrawal in 1961, after 86 years in service.

== Livery ==
As locomotives they were painted in dark green with red, black and light green (later black and white) lining, with numbers on buffer beams in yellow, shaded white and blue. The tank sides carried number plates with polished numbers against a paint black background on the plate. After about 1915 they became all-over plain grey, initially with numberplates painted on in grey, but latterly under CIÉ these were removed and large pale yellow painted numerals applied instead. No. 90, the last survivor, appears to have been repainted black in its last few years in use, approximately 1957–60.

== Preservation ==
Recognising No. 90's historical importance, CIÉ marked the engine for preservation and put in on display in Fermoy station on the Waterford–Mallow railway line. Following the line's closure in 1967, it was moved to a plinth at Mallow, where its condition worsened until being moved into the shed there for restoration by the Great Southern Railway Preservation Society in 1984.

After the proposed restoration did not materialise, 90 was moved to Tuam in 1985 to be restored by Westrail. It had its first steaming in preservation in August 1990 and subsequently hauled trains until Westrail ceased operations in 1993 owing to a lack of drivers. Concerns about the shed it was stored in led to 90 being moved to Inchicore in 2004. The following year, the locomotive was acquired by the Downpatrick and County Down Railway and moved to Whitehead for restoration, returning to operation at Downpatrick in 2007.

Multiple issues meant 90 was withdrawn prematurely in 2010. After a couple of years in storage, restoration work began on the locomotive in 2023.

== See also ==
- Diesel Locomotives of Ireland
- Multiple Units of Ireland
- Coaching Stock of Ireland
- Steam locomotives of Ireland
