= Rathmore railway station =

Railway station in County Kerry, Ireland

Rathmore An Ráth Mhór
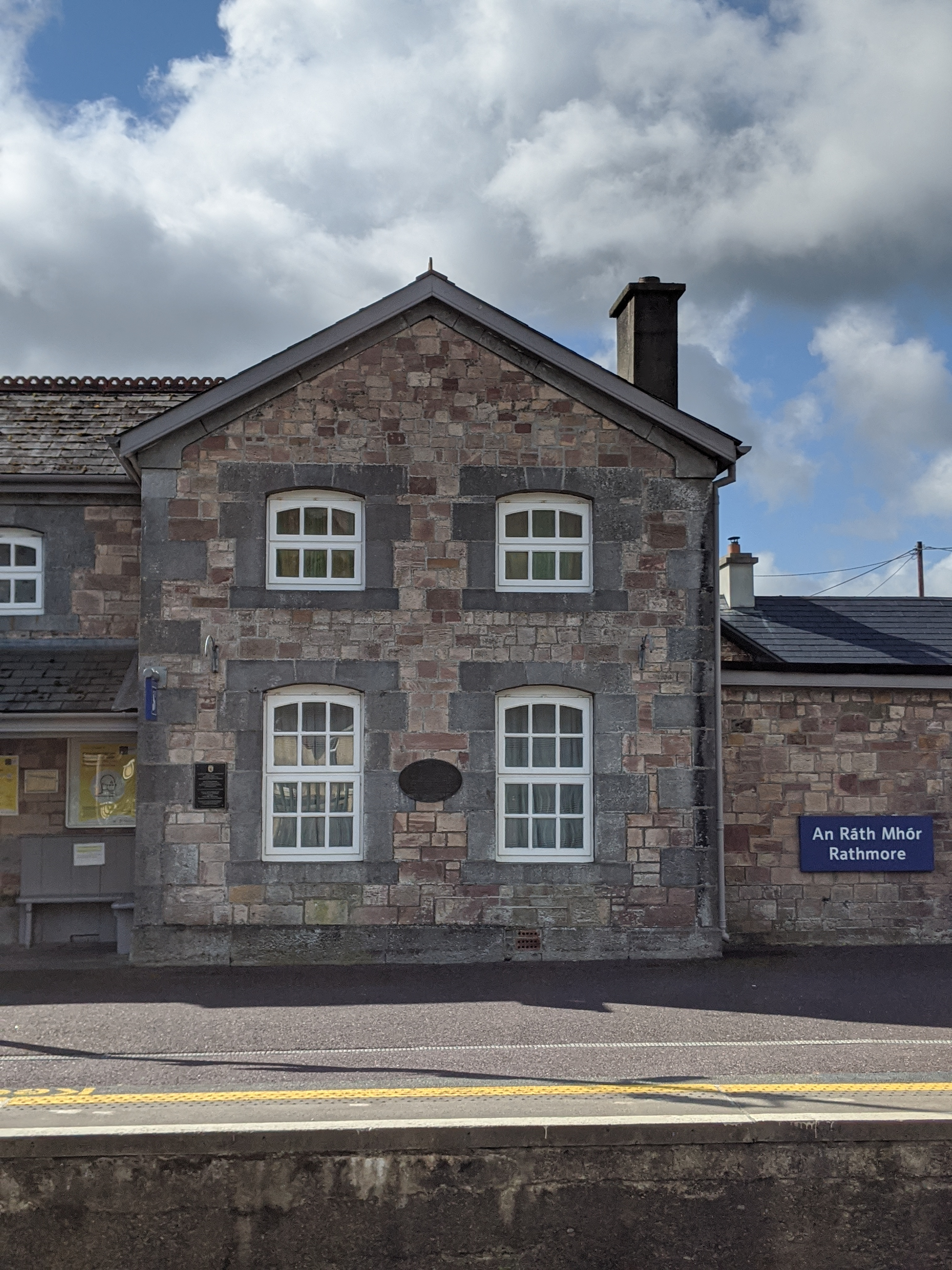
- Rathmore railway station

General information
- Location: Rathmore; County Kerry; Ireland
- Coordinates: 52°05′07″N 9°13′04″W
- Owner: Iarnród Éireann
- Operator: Iarnród Éireann
- Platforms: 2
- Bus operators: Bus Éireann
- Connections: 40A; 257

Construction
- Structure type: At-grade
- Parking: Yes
- Accessible: Yes

History
- Opened: 1854
- Original company: Great Southern and Western Railway
- Pre-grouping: Great Southern and Western Railway
- Post-grouping: Great Southern Railways

Key dates
- 1854: Station opened
Services
Preceding station	Iarnród Éireann	Following station
Millstreet	InterCity; Dublin-Tralee	Killarney
Millstreet	InterCity; Cork-Tralee	Killarney
Millstreet	Commuter; Mallow-Tralee railway line	Killarney
Route map
Location

Rathmore railway station is a station on the Mallow to Tralee railway line and serves the town of Rathmore in County Kerry, Ireland.

The station opened on 1 December 1854 and was closed for goods traffic on 3 November 1975.
