= Banteer railway station =

Railway station in County Cork, Ireland

Banteer Bántír
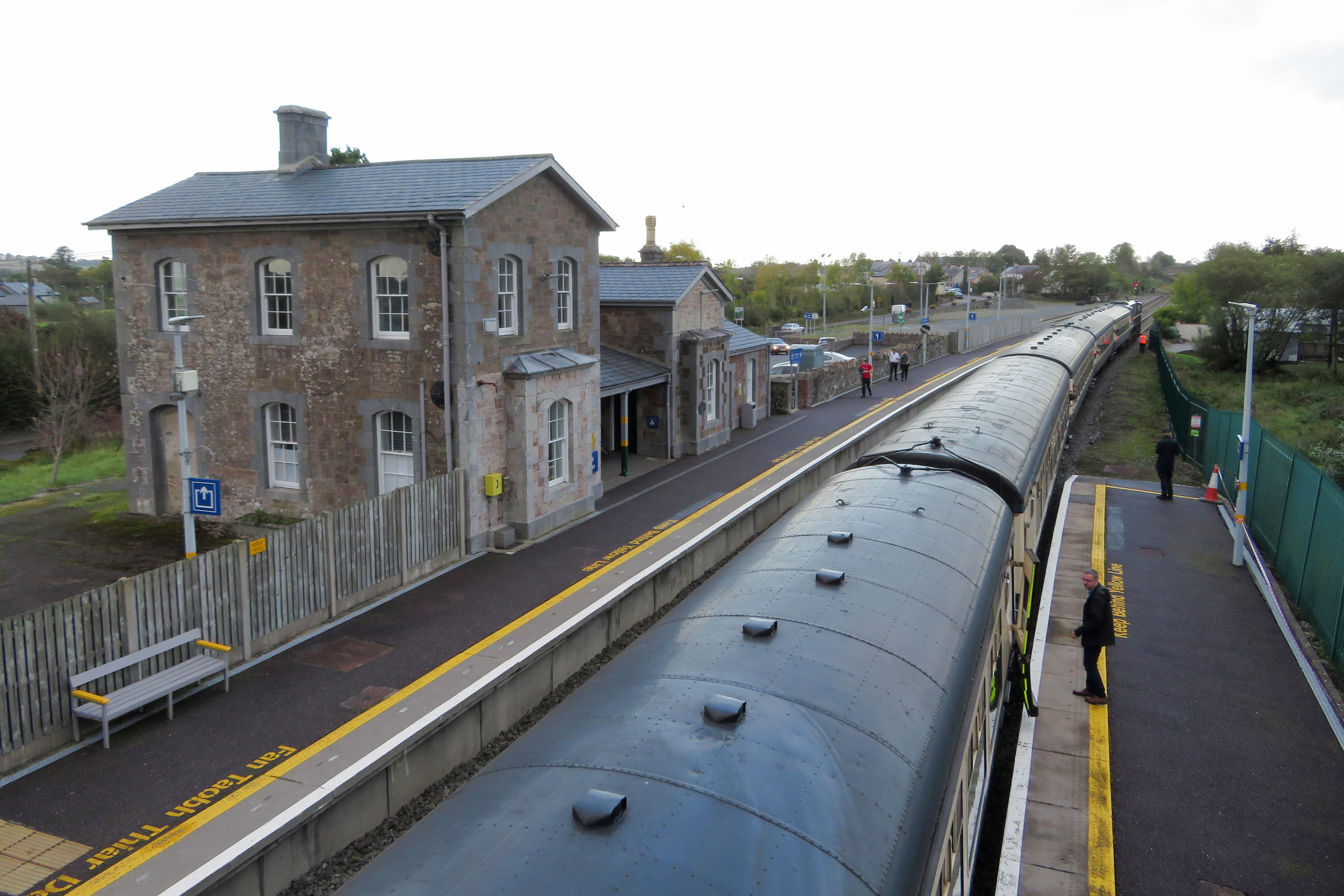
- Banter railway station

General information
- Location: Banteer; County Cork; Ireland
- Coordinates: 52°07′44″N 8°53′57″W
- Owner: Iarnród Éireann
- Operator: Iarnród Éireann
- Platforms: 2

Construction
- Structure type: At-grade
- Parking: Yes

History
- Opened: 1853
- Original company: Great Southern and Western Railway
- Pre-grouping: Great Southern and Western Railway
- Post-grouping: Great Southern Railways

Key dates
- 1853: Station opened
Services
Preceding station	Iarnród Éireann	Following station
Mallow	InterCity; Dublin-Tralee	Millstreet
Mallow	InterCity; Cork-Tralee	Millstreet
Mallow	Commuter; Mallow-Tralee railway line	Millstreet
Route map
Location

Banteer railway station is a station on the Mallow to Tralee railway line and serves the village of Banteer in County Cork, Ireland. It is the next adjacent station to Kanturk, County Cork.

The station opened on 16 April 1853 and was closed for goods traffic on 2 September 1976.

The 9 miles (14 km) branch to Newmarket closed to passengers in 1944, reopened for a year in 1946, then carried only occasional livestock trains until CIÉ applied to close it in 1954.
