= Tralee Casement railway station =

Train station in Co. Kerry, Ireland

Tralee Casement Stáisiún Mhic Easmainn Trá Lí
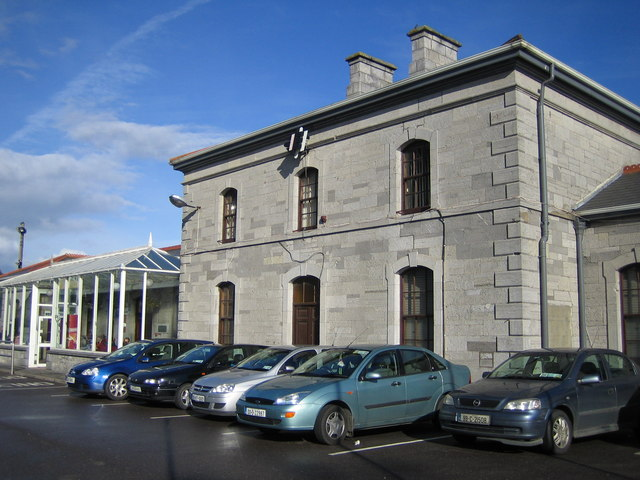
- Tralee railway station in 2006

General information
- Location: Tralee; County Kerry; Ireland
- Coordinates: 52.2710°N 9.6992°W
- Owner: Iarnród Éireann
- Operator: Iarnród Éireann
- Platforms: 2
- Bus operators: Bus Éireann; TFI Local Link
- Connections: 13; 14; 40; 271; 272; 273; 274; 275; 278; 279; 279A; 283; 284

Construction
- Structure type: At-grade
- Parking: Yes
- Cycle facilities: Yes
- Accessible: Yes

History
- Opened: 1859
- Former names: Tralee South
- Original company: Great Southern and Western Railway; Tralee and Dingle Light Railway
- Pre-grouping: Great Southern and Western Railway
- Post-grouping: Great Southern Railways

Key dates
- 1859: Opened as Tralee South
- 1966: Renamed as Casement Station
Services
Preceding station	Iarnród Éireann	Following station
Farranfore	Commuter; Mallow-Tralee	Terminus
Farranfore	InterCity; Dublin-Tralee	Terminus
Farranfore	InterCity; Cork-Tralee	Terminus
	Disused railways	
Ardfert	Great Southern and Western Railway; Limerick-Tralee	Terminus
Route map
Location

Tralee Casement station (Tralee Railway Station; Irish: Stáisiún Mhic Easmainn Trá Lí) is the terminus station on the Mallow–Tralee line and serves the town of Tralee in County Kerry. It is the most westerly railway station in Europe. The station, which is commonly known as the Tralee railway station, was built in 1859 originally as the Tralee South station and then re-named in 1966.

== Description ==
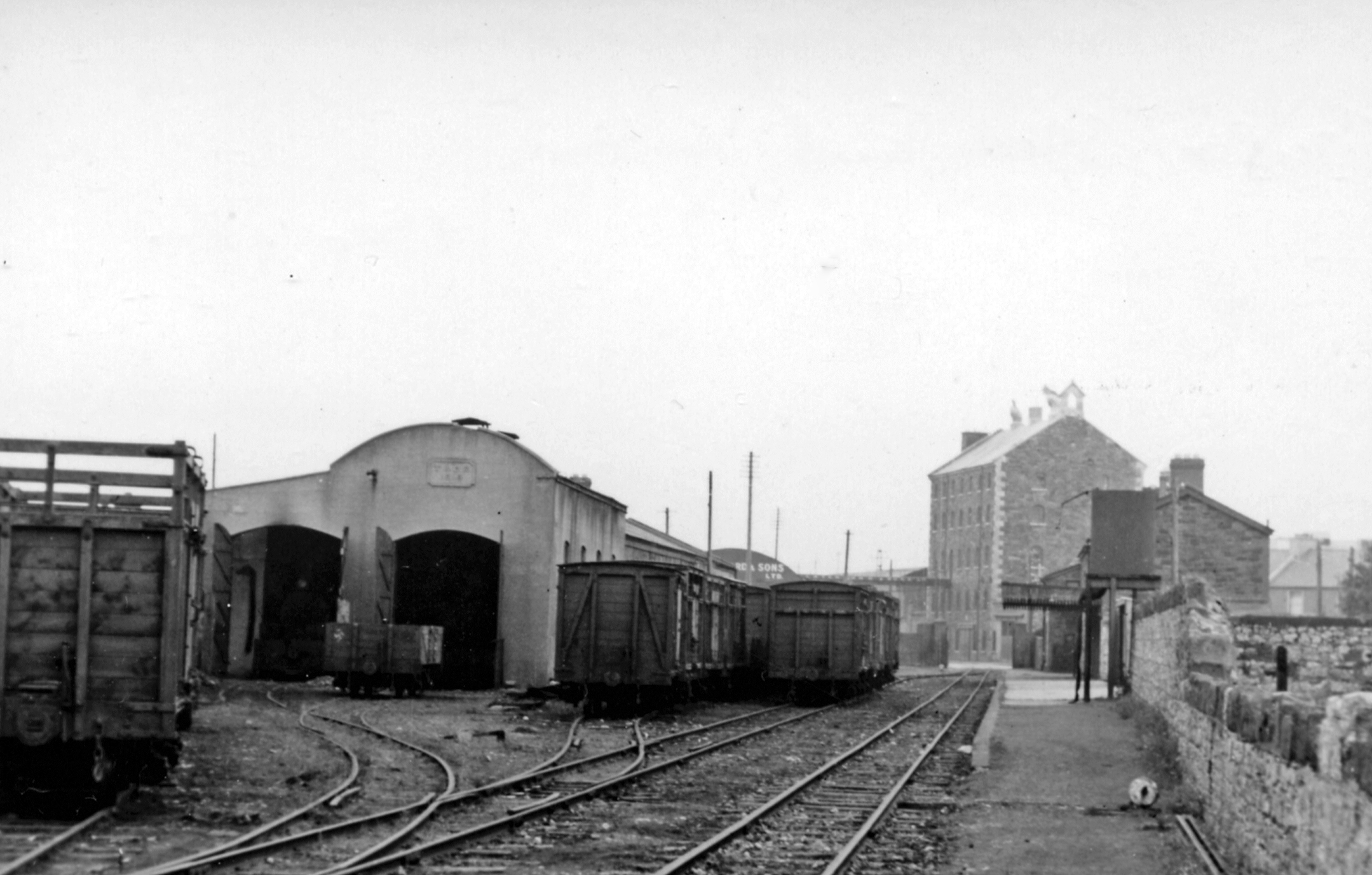
Tralee station and sheds, 1948.

Superficially, Tralee station resembles Killarney railway station, with the main station buildings lying south of the main line, and a short overall roof covering part of the main platform and the run-round loop. There is also a shorter bay platform serving the south face of the main platform, stopping short of the main building. A platform canopy covers part of both platforms 1 and 2, east of the main building and overall roof. Both platforms were considerably extended in 1979.

Until recently there was an active container terminal and freight yard opposite the main station. This survives for permanent way trains and the storage of redundant equipment. The yard opposite the passenger station was built in the late 1970s, on the site of the original freight yard and engine shed, to replace a larger yard alongside the former Tralee-Fenit and Tralee-Limerick line west of the passenger station. The Tralee-Fenit line has been converted into a greenway which opened in 2022. The rest of the site has been cleared and sold for redevelopment.

== Services ==
Passengers transfer at Mallow for services to Dublin and Cork or via a small number of direct Dublin and Cork services.

Tralee is served by 7–8 trains each weekday. There is a slightly reduced service on Sundays. There are 4 Dublin InterCity Trains on Sundays.

There are also connecting trains at Limerick Junction for Clonmel and Waterford as well as Limerick, Ennis, Athenry and Galway.

== History ==
The station, originally named Tralee South, was opened on 18 July 1859.

A serious accident occurred at the station on 24 April 1901 at 6.20 am. The 2.30 am Mallow to Tralee mail goods train failed to stop, and ran into the buffer stops at a speed estimated at between 25 and 30 mph. The driver of the train and a guard who had been travelling on the footplate were killed instantly. The fireman died a few hours later.

On 10 April 1966, the station was given the name Casement in commemoration of Roger Casement, one of the executed leaders of the Easter Rising of 1916.

== See also ==
- List of railway stations in Ireland
