= Millstreet railway station =

Railway station in Millstreet, Ireland

Millstreet Sráid an Mhuilinn
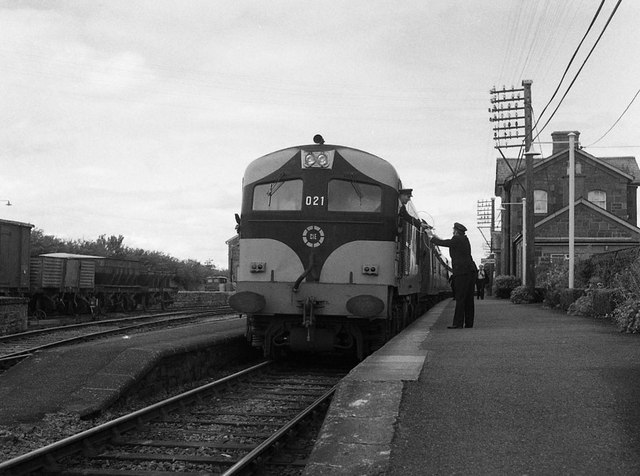
- Millstreet railway station in July 1976

General information
- Location: Millstreet; County Cork; Ireland
- Coordinates: 52°04′39″N 9°04′12″W
- Owner: Iarnród Éireann
- Operator: Iarnród Éireann
- Platforms: 2

Construction
- Structure type: At-grade
- Parking: Yes

History
- Opened: 1853
- Original company: Great Southern and Western Railway
- Pre-grouping: Great Southern and Western Railway
- Post-grouping: Great Southern Railways

Key dates
- 1853: Station opened
Services
Preceding station	Iarnród Éireann	Following station
Banteer	InterCity; Dublin-Tralee	Rathmore
Banteer	InterCity; Cork-Tralee	Rathmore
Banteer	Commuter; Mallow-Tralee railway line	Rathmore
Route map
Location

Millstreet railway station serves the town of Millstreet in County Cork. The station opened on 16 April 1853 and closed for goods traffic on 6 September 1976.

== Upgradings & improvements ==
The original railway station was much smaller to the current one. The station was heavily upgraded for the 1993 Eurovision Song Contest, which was held in Millstreet. Before 1993, there was one track which went to Rathmore and Banteer. As part of the redevelopment plan, a new track was constructed opposite the main platform. This meant there could be two trains in the station at one time. However, since the Eurovision, the spare track has been rarely used. The platform was upgraded to meet EU safety standards, and is now much higher than before 1993.

== Facilities ==
The station has two platforms, but only one is ever used. The track meets the main Millstreet-Mallow road on the Kerry direction, and can be a small hazard, but it is relatively safe since the introduction of barriers. There is a ticket office where information can be found and tickets sold. There is one toilet catering for both male and female, and there is a ticket vending machine. There is a small car park to the entrance to the station and an overflow car park across the road.

== Services ==
Normally twelve trains pass through Millstreet every day in each direction, depending on the day of the week, with an average interval of approximately two hours between trains. Most services are operated by Commuter railcars, but four service each day both ways is normally operated by an InterCity 22000 Class train.

The station is one of the best maintained on the island of Ireland, and serves the local community, as Macroom is also served by this station. The station caters for the mid-Cork region.
