= Mallow railway station =

Rail station in Mallow, County Cork, Ireland

Mallow Mala
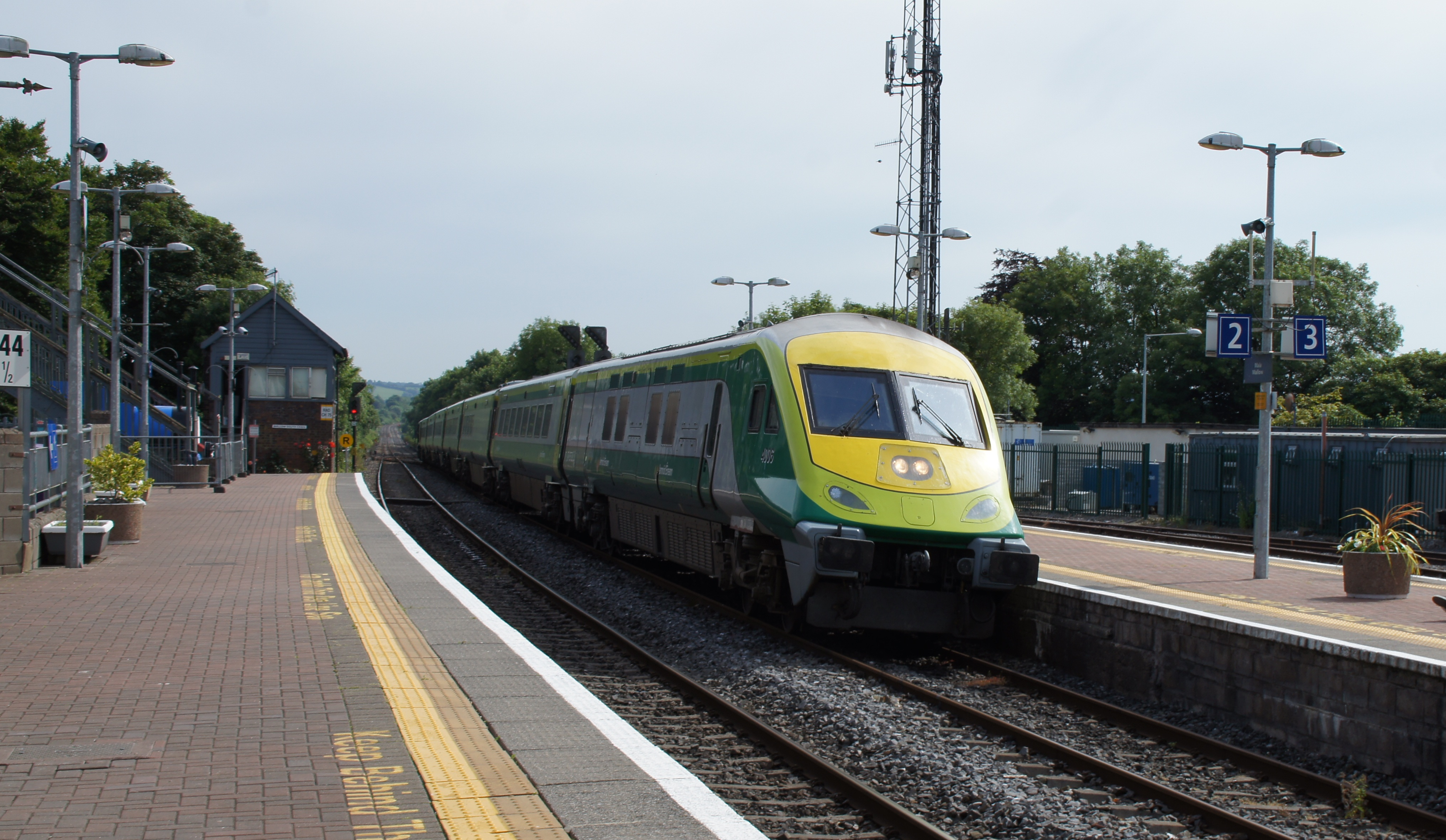
- Mark 4 at the station

General information
- Location: Annabella, Mallow, County Cork; Ireland
- Coordinates: 52.1396°N 8.65521°W
- Owner: Iarnród Éireann
- Lines: Dublin–Cork railway line Mallow–Tralee railway line
- Platforms: 3
- Bus operators: Bus Éireann; TFI Local Link
- Connections: 243; 522; 523; 530

Construction
- Structure type: At-grade

Other information
- Station code: 21

History
- Original company: Great Southern and Western Railway
- Pre-grouping: Great Southern and Western Railway
- Post-grouping: Great Southern Railways

Key dates
- 1849: Station opened

Services
Preceding station	Iarnród Éireann	Following station
Charleville towards Dublin Heuston	InterCity Dublin–Cork	Cork Kent Terminus
Banteer towards Tralee	InterCity Dublin–Tralee	Limerick Junction towards Dublin Heuston
Banteer towards Tralee	InterCity Cork–Tralee	Cork Kent Terminus
Terminus	Commuter Cork–Mallow	Cork Kent Terminus
Banteer towards Tralee	Commuter Mallow–Tralee	Terminus
Location

Mallow railway station is an Irish station on the Dublin-Cork railway line, Mallow-Tralee railway line and Cork Suburban Rail (Cork Kent, Cobh and Midleton).

== Facilities ==
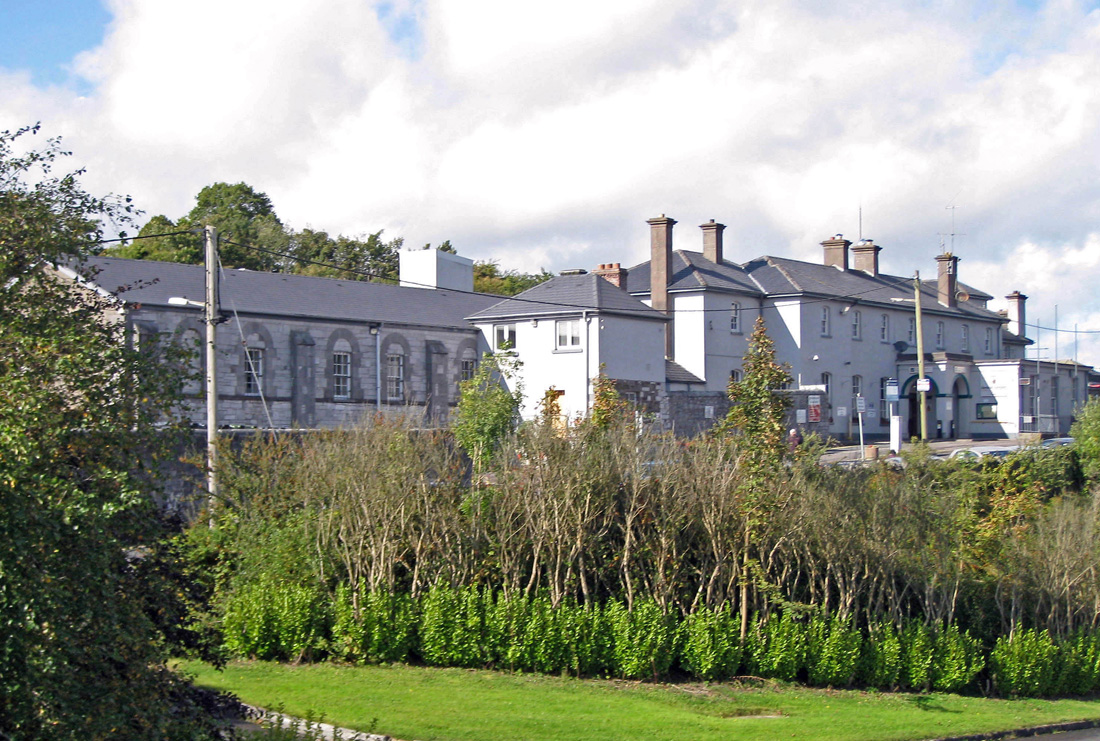
The station building from the south

Mallow's main station building is located on the south side of the railway tracks, nearest to the town, and is constructed from the grey stone typical of many Irish stations. It houses the booking office, administration accommodation and other facilities. There is a covered footbridge at the south-west end which enables passengers to reach the two other platforms, which are all through platforms. It is the transfer station for passengers changing onto the Mallow–Tralee line. The station was acclaimed as Iarnród Éireann's best overall station in 2004.

== Location ==
The station is located in Annabella, just outside Mallow, in north County Cork. It is situated just north of the junction between the lines from Cork and Tralee. It is two miles from Cork Racecourse.

== History ==
The station opened on 19 March 1849 when the line from Limerick Junction opened. It was originally built and operated by the Mallow and Fermoy Railway, which became part of the Great Southern and Western Railway in 1857. Until March 1967 Mallow was also the junction of a line which ran to Waterford via Fermoy, Lismore and Dungarvan.

== Services ==
Passengers can travel from Mallow to Limerick Junction to reach Limerick, Ennis, Athenry, Oranmore and Galway along the Western Rail Corridor. There are also trains from Limerick Junction via Clonmel to Waterford.

=== Rail Air Links ===
Passengers can travel direct to Farranfore for Kerry Airport. Passengers can travel via Limerick Junction and Limerick for a bus connection to Shannon Airport.
