= Mark 4 (Iarnród Éireann) =

Railway carriages

Iarnród Éireann Mark 4
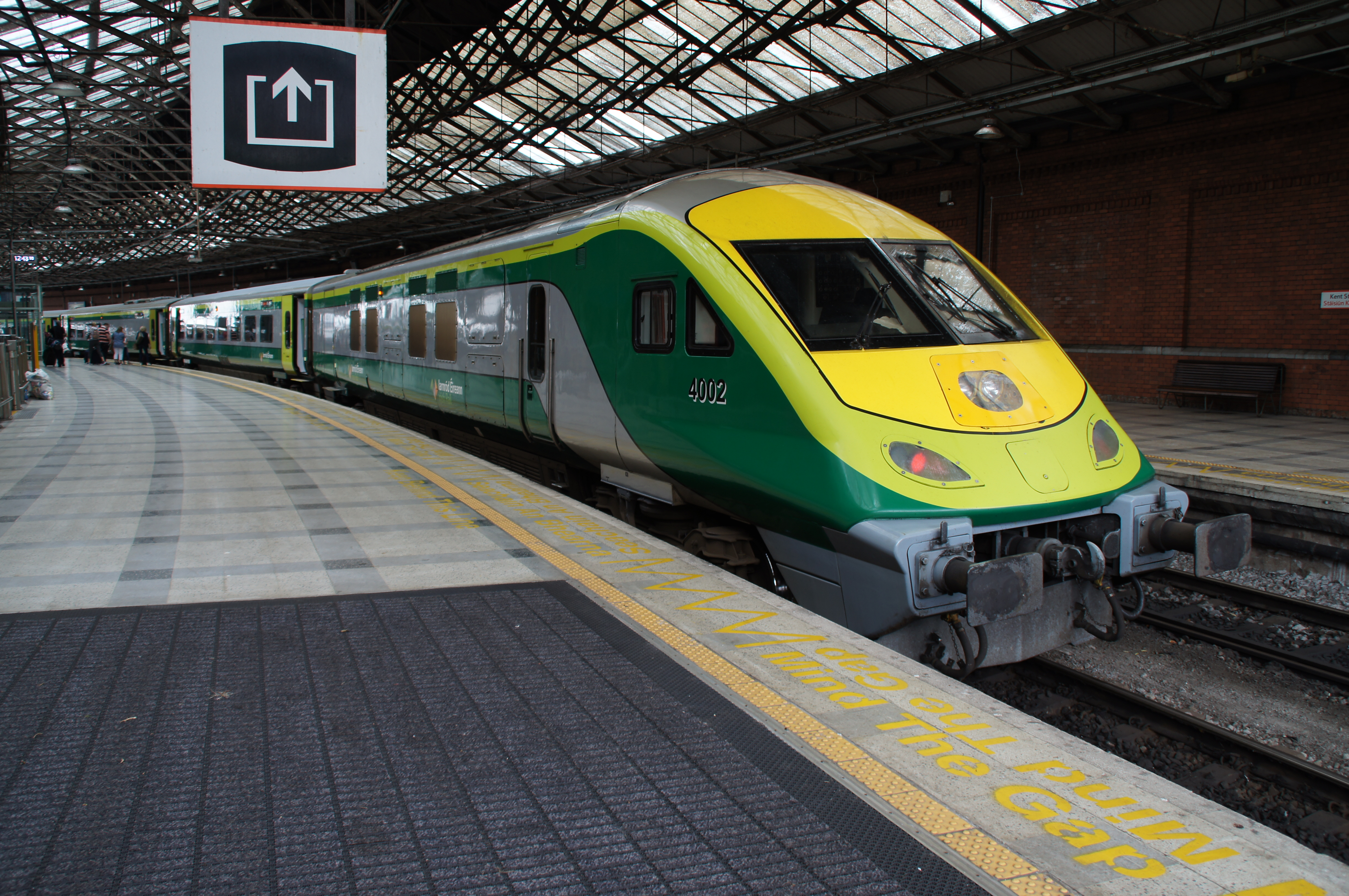
- Mark 4 DVT at Cork Kent railway station
- In service: 22 May 2006–present
- Manufacturer: CAF
- Family name: Mark 4
- Constructed: 2004–2005
- Number built: 7 trainsets (in operation); 8 trainsets (total) (spare)
- Formation: 7-8-car trainsets
- Capacity: 422 seated (maximum 493)
- Operator: InterCity

Specifications
- Train length: 189.43 metres (621 feet 6 inches)
- Width: 2.85 metres (9 feet 4 inches)
- Height: 3.85 metres (12 feet 8 inches)
- Maximum speed: Service: 160 km/h (100 mph); Design: 200 km/h (125 mph)
- Weight: 63 tonnes (62 long tons; 69 short tons) (Per Car)
- Prime mover: Twin MAN D2848 LE 202 (320 kW)
- Track gauge: 1,600 mm (5 ft 3 in) Irish Gauge; See Rail gauge in Ireland

The CAF Mark 4 (or MK4 or MKIV) are railway carriages operated by Iarnród Éireann in Ireland on the InterCity service from Dublin to Cork. These carriages have no connection to the British Rail Mark 4.

== History ==
Along with the occasional Cravens stocked train, the Dublin to Cork express was operated only with outdated slam-door British Rail Mark 2s and electric-door Mark 3s. Since only a limited amount of Mark 3 DVTs were available most services required a locomotive shunt at the end of each trip. This resulted in an infrequent service with most services bunched in the morning and evening rush hours.

Iarnród Éireann opted to extend the service to an hourly clockface departure in order to increase growth on the line. Initially, to eliminate the Locomotive shunt, interest was expressed in a long range diesel multiple unit however, since Iarnród Éireann had a large fleet of high-speed diesel locomotives which were less than ten years old, a push–pull train was chosen instead.

Funding was procured from the Irish Government and an invitation to tender was put forward in 2001 and four companies qualified. In November 2002 the contract was awarded to Construcciones y Auxiliar de Ferrocarriles.

== Description ==
67 Mark 4 coaches were manufactured in 2004-2005 by CAF and delivered in 2006. The designs for the interior of the carriages and the exterior styling of the DVT were produced for CAF by Design Triangle.

Capable of 10-car operation, each in-service set currently comprises 8 cars:

- Generator Control Car - GC (or DVT)
- One First Class - FC
- One Catering Car - CC
- Four Standard Class - SC
- One Standard End - SCE, with retractable buffers & drop-head buckeye coupling at locomotive end.

Seating capacity is 422 (8-car set), the DVT (driving van trailer) is recognised as a carriage and the train is fully accessible to mobility-impaired customers.

The DVT Features a Yellow front end to ensure visibility and has a compartment towards the rear to carry Mail and Luggage.

== Main features ==
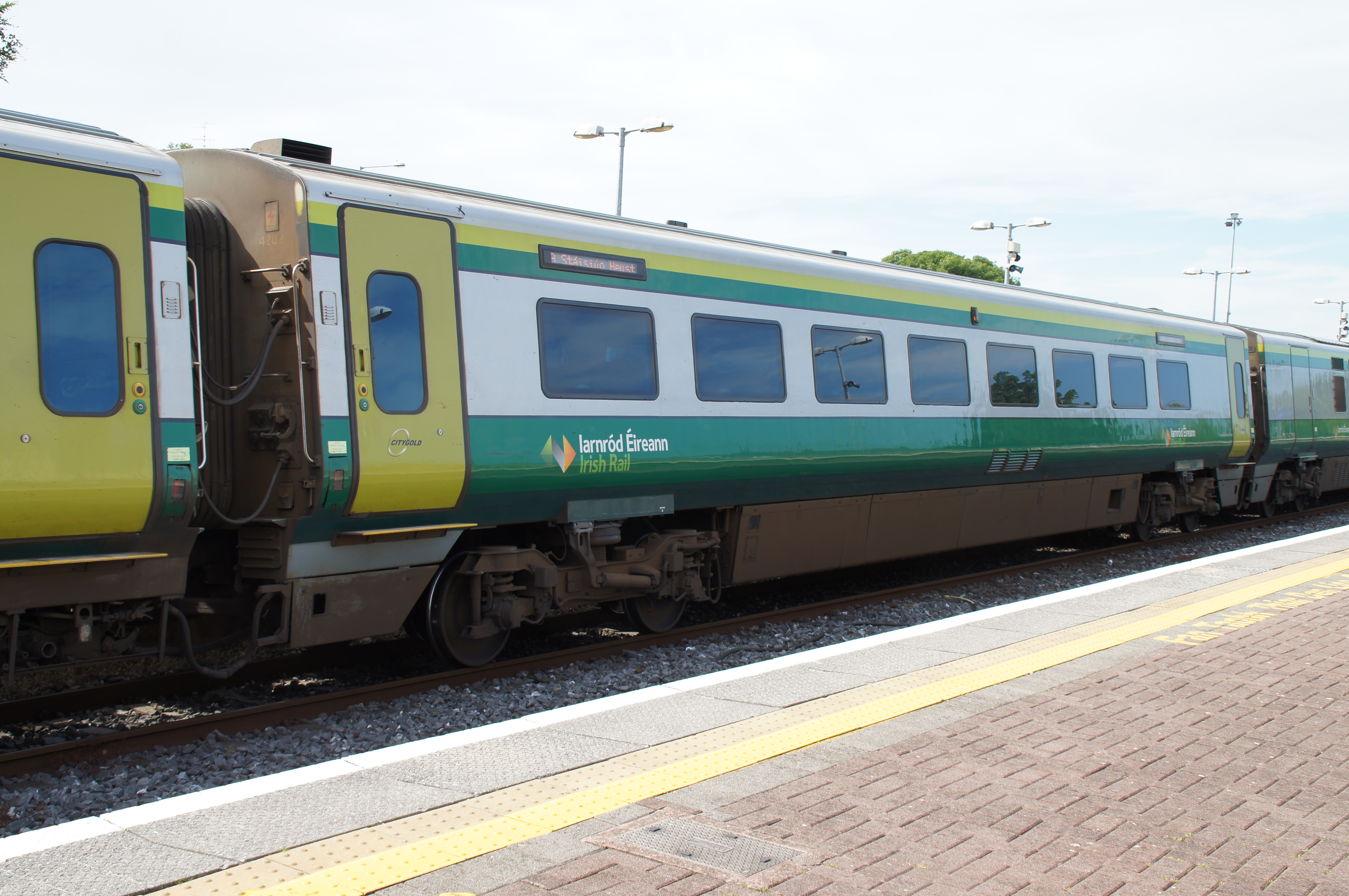
CAF Mark 4 passenger carriages

The Standard Class carriages have improved passenger seating and leg room. They also have electronic visual and audible passenger information systems, electronic seat reservation displays, CCTV, air conditioning and additional space for luggage. Power sockets are supplied on all Standard and Citygold Class coaches. Citygold cars have ergonomic, electronically adjustable seats, multi-channel ear phone jack sockets and individual overhead lighting.

Main features include:

- Merak HVAC
- Power operated passenger doors
- Fire resistance to BS 6553:1999 Cat 1B
- Public address (PA) including automated announcements in Irish and English
- Closed-circuit television (CCTV) recording, including a forward-facing camera in the DVT
- LED Exterior & Interior Destination signs
- Seat Reservation system with reserved seating LED displays above each passenger seat. System is updated via Wireless LAN (W-LAN)
- LED Route Maps
- In-seat audio in First Class
- Power operated seating in First Class
- Suspension:
  - Primary coil springs & secondary air bags
- Sanding on leading axle of GC & trailing axle of SCE cars
- Scharfenberg couplers between cars, drop-head buckeye couplers each end
- Wheelchair area & accessible toilets to UK Rail Vehicle Accessibility Regulations

Key dimensions:

- Length between couplers - 23.66 metres (77 feet 7 inches)
- Height - 3.85 metres (12 feet 8 inches)
- Width - 2.85 metres (9 feet 4 inches)

== Mark 4 DVT ==
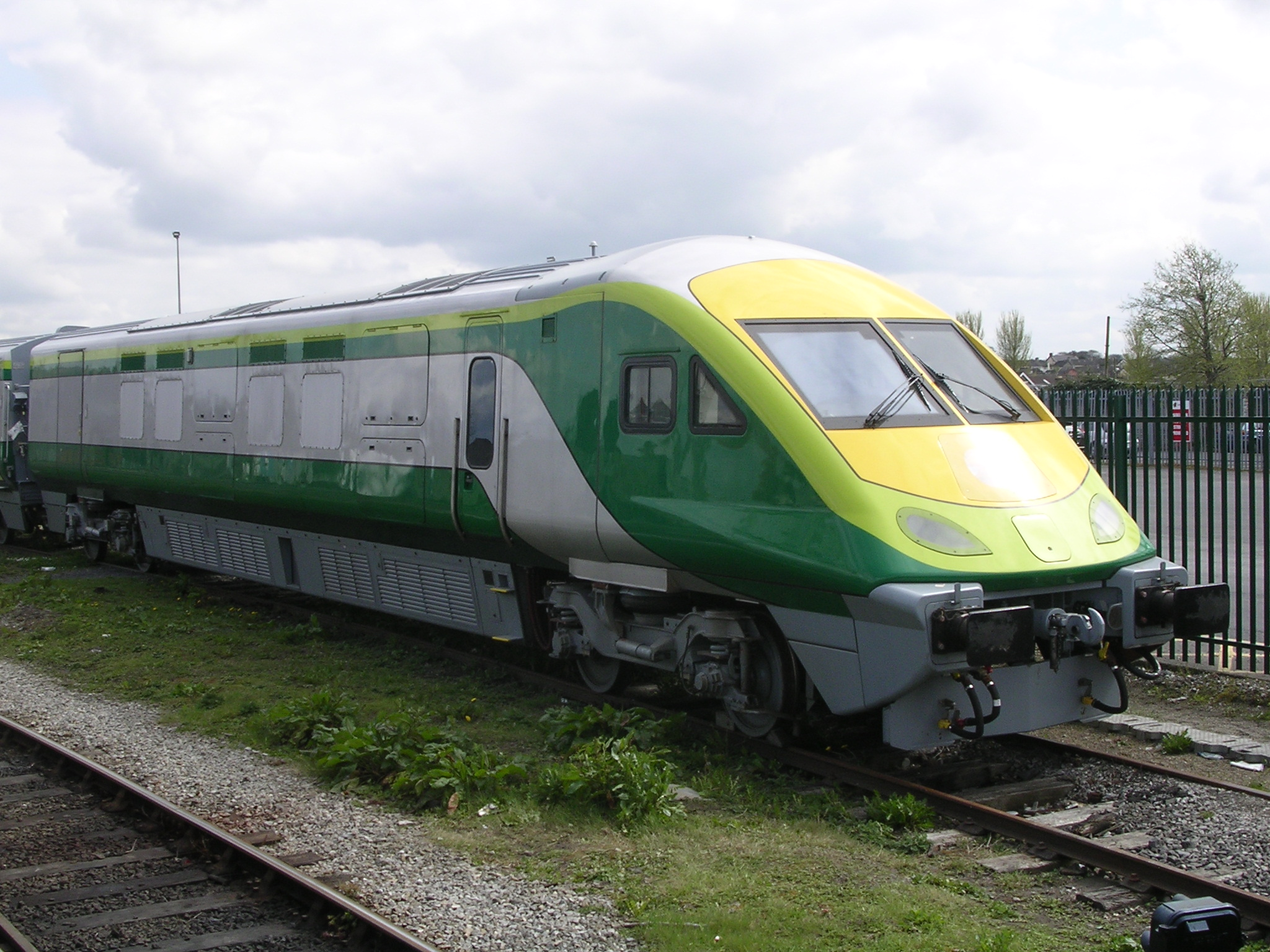
Mark 4 DVT car

- Air-conditioned driver's cab
- Fault Diagnostic system, displayed on driver's monitor
- Luggage Compartment
- Fire Suppression System
  - Generator engine compartment protected by FM200 extinguisher
  - Fuel tank protected by AFFF extinguisher
- Generators:
  - Twin MAN D2848 LE 202 (320kW) / Letag (330kVA) engine / generator sets, assembled by GESAN
- Length between couplers - 23.81 m (78.1 ft)

== Performance ==
Although capable of 200 km/h (125 mph) operation, this higher speed would require both track and signal system upgrades and the provision of a faster locomotive than the currently used 201 class. A possibility being considered is the replacement of the existing 201 with two power cars, one of which would be converted from the existing generator control car.

== Replacement stock ==
Since January 2016, six sets operate the Dublin-Cork route on an enhanced hourly clockface timetable. ICR's are used at quieter times of the day. The Mark 3 carriages, withdrawn in 2009, replaced the older Mark 2 carriages that previously operated mid-day Limerick, Galway and Waterford routes. The Mark 3s were in turn superseded by a new batch of 183 22000 Class in 2009. The first batch of these was delivered in early March 2007, while the final deliveries took place in 2012.
