= GS&WR Class 21 =

Irish class of locomotive

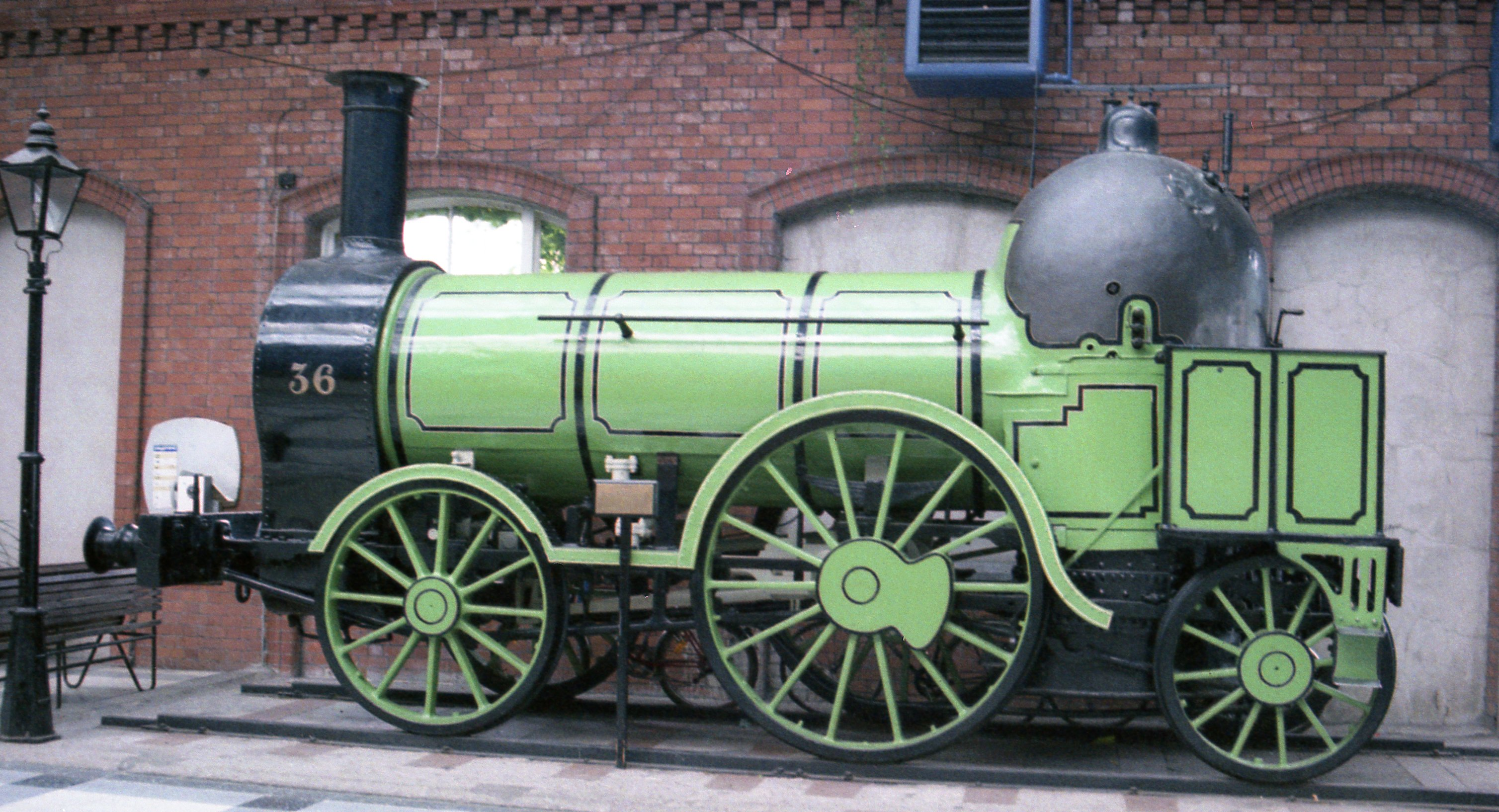
- No. 36 Preserved at Cork
Type and origin
- Power type: Steam
- Builder: Bury, Curtis and Kennedy
- Build date: 1845 (Approx)
- Total produced: 20
Specifications
- Configuration
  - Whyte: 2-2-2
- Gauge: 5 ft 3 in (1,600 mm)
- Driver dia.: 6 ft 0 in (1,830 mm); 5 ft 8 in (1,730 mm)
- Cylinders: 2
- Cylinder size: 15 in × 20 in (381 mm × 508 mm)
Career
- Operators: GS&WR
- Number in class: 20
- Numbers: 21—40
- Locale: Ireland
- Disposition: 1 preserved
- Individual locomotives had dimensional variations

The Great Southern and Western Railway (GS&WR) Class 21 (Note: There were two GS&WR Class 21's, this was the first one, the second possibly has the better claim.) (Or perhaps more simply engine numbers 21 to 40) consisted of half of the initial order of 40 passenger locomotives ordered for the GS&WR and which entered service between approximately 1845 and 1847. A number were later rebuilt to 2-4-0 locomotives for goods work.

Engine No. 36, built in 1847, covered 300,000 miles (480,000 km) and is preserved at Cork Kent. There were suggestions it was able to achieve 60 miles per hour (95 km/h) downhill on Ballybrophy bank but climbing out of Kingsbridge towards Inchicore on a wet day might require the fireman to walk alongside shovelling sand under the wheels to prevent slipping.
