= Parnell Place Bus Station =

Principal bus station for Cork city, Ireland

Parnell Place Bus Station (Cork)
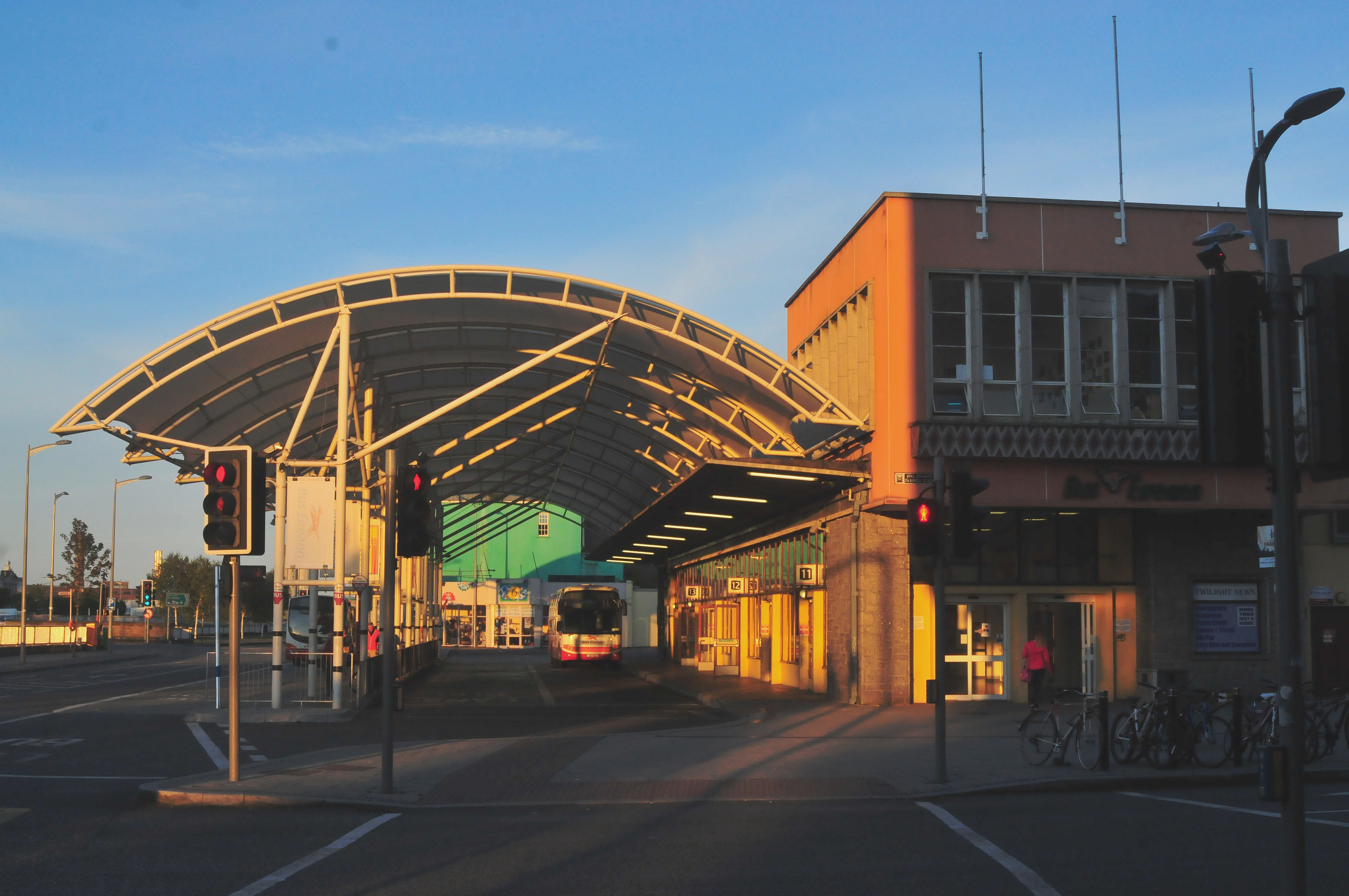

General information
- Location: Parnell Place, Cork; Ireland
- Coordinates: 51.8997°N 8.4665°W
- Bus operators: Bus Éireann; GoBé; Eurolines
- Connections: Cork Kent railway station (750 metres)
Location

Parnell Place Bus Station is the principal bus station in Cork, Ireland, for Expressway and Regional services operated by Bus Éireann.

Historically, all regional bus services to or from Cork City used Parnell Place bus station, but since 2014 a number of services to nearby towns such as Ballincollig, Crosshaven, Carrigaline and Passage West have started using on street bus stops due to capacity constraints.

== Services ==
=== National ===
As of July 2021,

National bus services from Parnell Place Bus Station
Destination	Operator	Route number	Via
Waterford	Bus Éireann	40 (eastbound)	Youghal, Dungarvan
Tralee	Bus Éireann	40 (westbound)	Killarney, Kerry Airport
Galway	Bus Éireann	51	Limerick, Shannon Airport
Dublin	Bus Éireann	245X	Cashel

=== Regional ===
As of October 2025

Regional bus services from Parnell Place Bus Station
Destination	Operator	Route number	Via
Knockraha	Bus Éireann	31	Tivoli, Glanmire, Riverstown, Hazelwood
Macroom	Bus Éireann	233	
Rylane	Bus Éireann	235	Cloghroe, Donoughmore, Stuake
Castletownbere	Bus Éireann	236	Bandon, Bantry, Glengarriff
Goleen	Bus Éireann	237	Bandon, Clonakilty, Skibbereen, Schull
Bandon	Bus Éireann	239	
Ballycotton	Bus Éireann	240	Cloyne
Trabolgan	Bus Éireann	241	Midleton, Whitegate
Newmarket	Bus Éireann	243	Mallow, Buttevant
Clonmel	Bus Éireann	245	Fermoy, Mitchelstown, Ballyporeen, Ardfinnan
Glenville	Bus Éireann	248	Carrignavar
Ardmore	Bus Éireann	260	Youghal
Ballinacurra	Bus Éireann	261	Carrigtwohill, Midleton

=== City ===
As of October 2025, no city services include a stop directly at Parnell Place Bus Station. However, several services stop at Merchant's Quay, less than 100m away – these include the 202, 203, 207A, 209, and 209A. Other services have an on-street stop on Clontarf St, just across the road from the bus station – these include the 212, 225 and 226; the latte two of which provide access to Cork Airport. The 205 service to University College Cork and Cork Institute of Technology has its terminus at Cork Kent railway station (750m walk), and multiple services stop on nearby St Patrick's Street.
