= Farranfore railway station =

Train station in southwest Ireland

Farranfore An Fearann Fuar
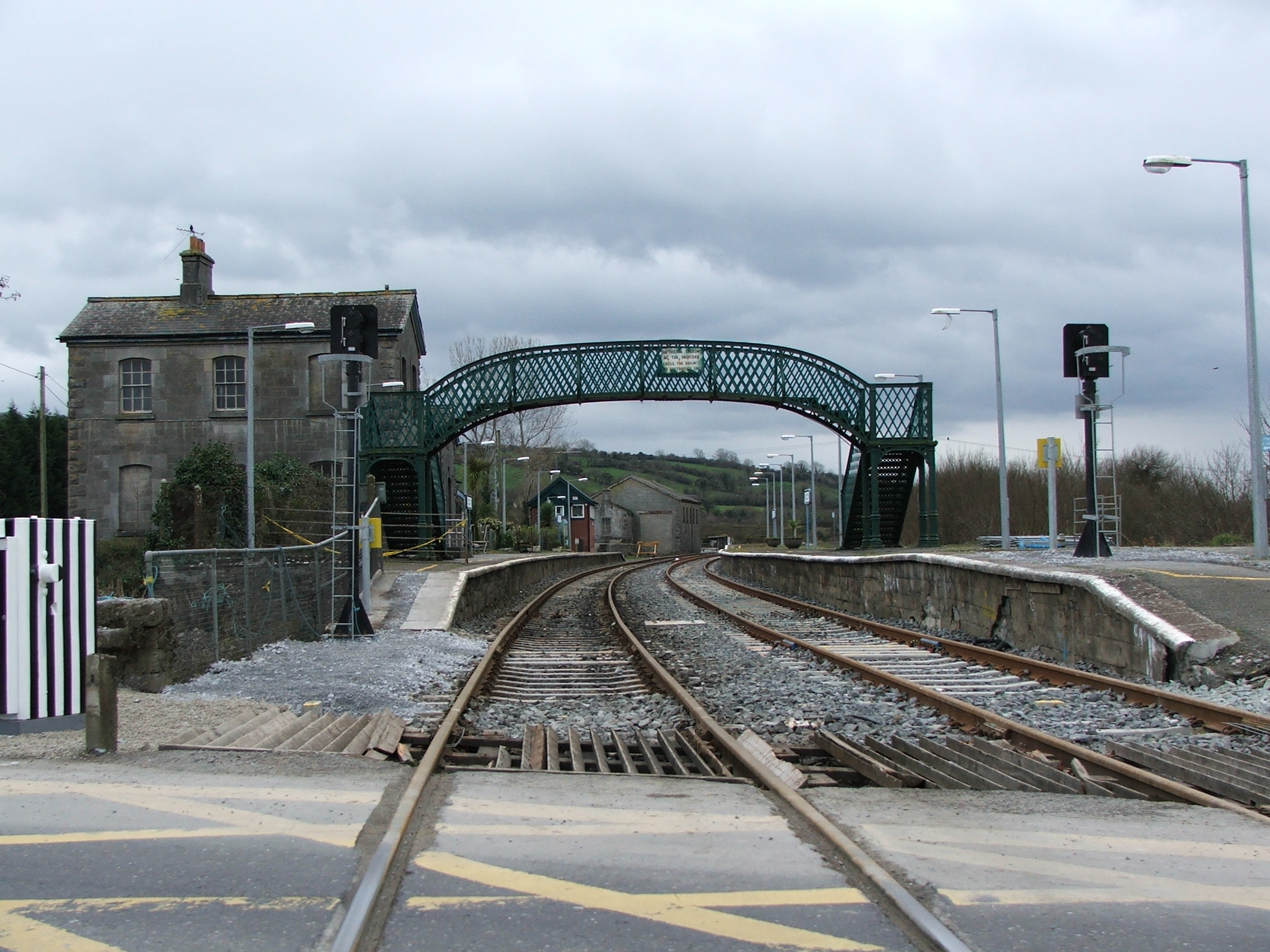
- Railway tracks stretch into the distance towards Killarney from the level crossing at the eastern end of Farranfore station

General information
- Location: Farranfore, County Kerry, Ireland
- Coordinates: 52.1733°N 9.55278°W
- Owner: Iarnród Éireann
- Operator: Iarnród Éireann
- Platforms: 2

Construction
- Structure type: At-grade
- Parking: Yes

Other information
- Station code: 27

History
- Original company: Great Southern and Western Railway
- Pre-grouping: Great Southern and Western Railway
- Post-grouping: Great Southern Railways

Key dates
- 18 July 1859: Station opened
Services
Preceding station	Iarnród Éireann	Following station
Killarney	InterCity; Dublin-Tralee	Tralee Casement
Killarney	InterCity; Cork-Tralee	Tralee Casement
Killarney	Commuter; Mallow-Tralee railway line	Tralee Casement
	Historical railways	
Ballybrack	Tralee and Killarney Railway; Tralee Junction-Tralee	Gortatlea
Terminus	Great Southern and Western Railway; Farranfore-Valentia Harbour	Molahiffe
Route map
Location

Farranfore railway station serves the village of Farranfore in County Kerry, Ireland. It is located a short distance away from Kerry Airport.

== History ==
The station opened on 18 July 1859 as part of the Tralee and Killarney Railway which opened on the same date and gave a continuous line from Dublin along the Great Southern and Western Railway (GS&WR) to Mallow then via the Killarney Junction Railway. The GS&WR had heavy interests and investments in both companies and absorbed them both on 1 May 1860.

The GS&WR completed a branch from Farranfore to Killorglin, some 12 miles (19 km) south on 15 January 1885, and this was extended to Valentia Harbour, the most westerly station in Ireland, c. 40 miles (64 km) distant, which opened on 12 September 1893.

The line to Valentia diverged from the Mallow/Dublin line to the south of the station, (Note: Farranfore station lies in an approximate north-south direction with the line to Dublin and Mallow to the south and the line to Tralee to the North.) and a bay platform adjacent to the west (down) platform was provided for trains to and from Valentia. In general trains to Valentia originated from Tralee and returned there, and were often timed to pass a Mallow-Tralee train in the opposite direction at Farranfore. The usual procedure was for the Valentia train to use the bay (thus requiring a reversal either in or out) and for the main line train to use the down platform, even if an up train towards Mallow, thus enabling a cross-platform interchange between the two trains.

The Farranfore–Valentia Harbour line closed on 1 February 1960.
