= Killarney railway station =

Train station in County Kerry, Ireland

Killarney Cill Airne
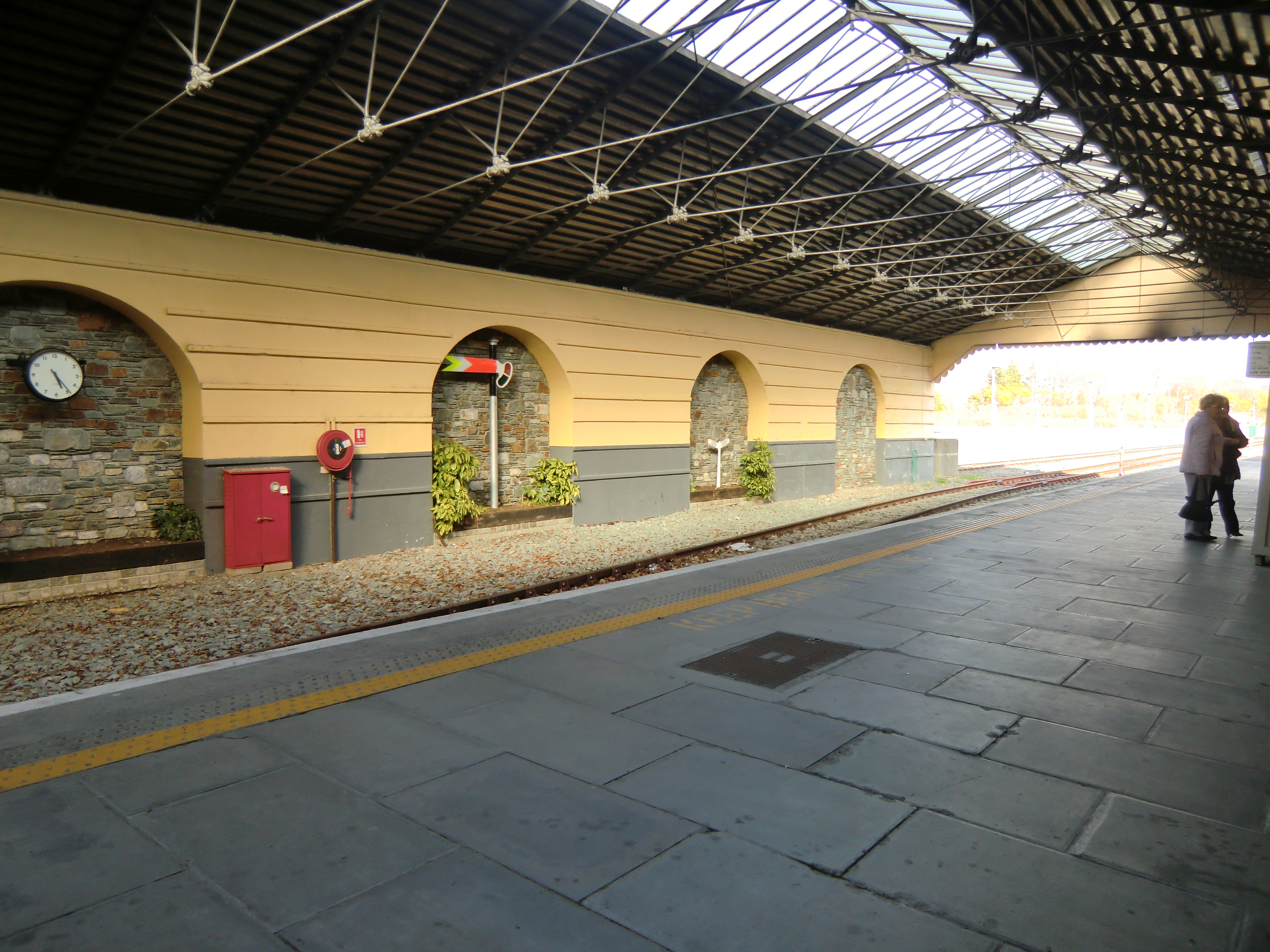
- Killarney railway station

General information
- Location: Killarney; County Kerry; Ireland
- Coordinates: 52.05920°N 9.50264°W
- Owner: Iarnród Éireann
- Operator: Iarnród Éireann
- Platforms: 2
- Bus operators: Bus Éireann; Gleneagle Hotel; TFI Local Link
- Connections: 14; 40; 257; 270; 271; 276; 279; 280; 284; KY03

Construction
- Structure type: At-grade
- Parking: Yes
- Cycle facilities: Yes
- Accessible: Yes

History
- Opened: 1853
- Original company: Great Southern and Western Railway
- Pre-grouping: Great Southern and Western Railway
- Post-grouping: Great Southern Railways

Key dates
- 1853: Station opened
Services
Preceding station	Iarnród Éireann	Following station
Rathmore	InterCity; Dublin-Tralee	Farranfore
Rathmore	InterCity; Cork-Tralee	Farranfore
Rathmore	Commuter; Mallow-Tralee railway line	Farranfore
Route map
Location

Killarney railway station is a station on the Mallow to Tralee line serving the town of Killarney in County Kerry.

It is situated next to the bus station and Killarney Outlet Centre. Adjacent to the station on the approach road is the Great Southern Hotel which was built for the railway in 1854 and was owned by CIE until 1984.

The station has a moderately large stone building on the southside of the main platform, and a short overall roof. Since the platform was extended during the Mallow-Tralee mini-CTC scheme very little of the main platform is covered. There is also a bay serving the south face of the main platform which is several carriage lengths shorter than the main platform and terminates in buffer stops just short of the main station building. The former freight yard is opposite the main buildings on the northside of the station.

Trains running from Mallow to Tralee calling at Killarney run into either the main platform or the bay platform then reverse into the headshunt to gain the line to Tralee. Trains from Tralee to Mallow pass the station and reverse in (if travelling towards Mallow).

Most of the services on the line are now operated by bi-directional diesel multiple unit trains. Locomotive hauled trains from Tralee to Cork, Mallow and Dublin simply passed the station, stopped, then reversed into the platforms, then to continue on their way to Mallow with the engine always at the "right-end" - the reverse applied with trains from Mallow to Tralee which entered the station, reversed out and continued on their way, again with the locomotive at the right end without running round. The situation is different at Kilkenny where as direction was changed, locomotives had to be detached and put on the front of the train. A change of ends for locomotives was required. At Killarney there is also a facing crossover east of the station that allows trains in either direction to bypass Killarney Station, but it has been used for this purpose only rarely since freight trains to Tralee ended.

The station opened on 15 July 1853 as the terminus of a 40-mile branch from Mallow. This was subsequently extended to Tralee.

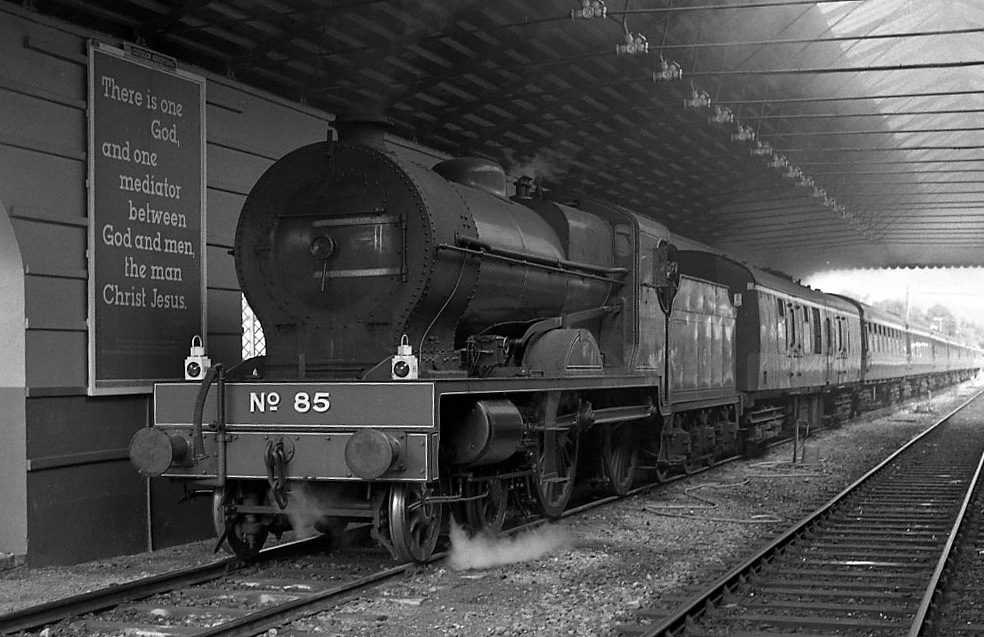
A railtour in May 1989 organised by the Railway Preservation Society of Ireland in the station.

== See also ==
- List of railway stations in Ireland
