= Mallow–Tralee railway line =

Railway line in Ireland

Mallow–Tralee
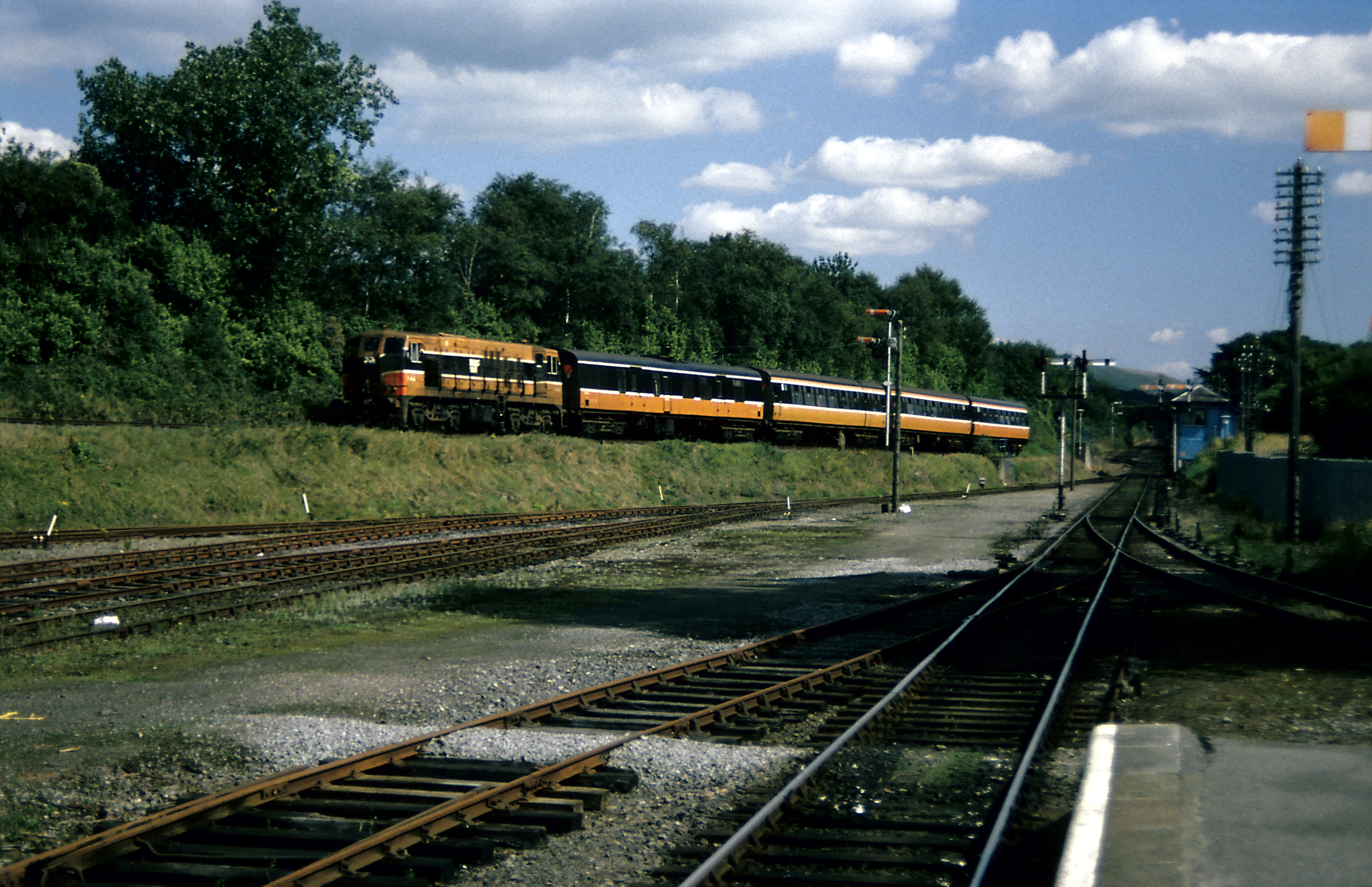
- Service from Cork after reversing out of Killarney station to continue forwards to Tralee

Overview
- Status: Operational
- Locale: County Cork, County Kerry
- Termini: Mallow; Tralee
- Stations: 7

Service
- Type: Heavy rail, Inter-city rail
- System: Iarnród Éireann
- Services: Mallow–Tralee; Dublin–Tralee; Cork–Tralee
- Operator: Iarnród Éireann
- Rolling stock: 22000 Class

History
- Opened: 15 July 1853

Technical
- Line length: 61.5 mi (99.0 km)
- Number of tracks: Single track
- Track gauge: 1,600 mm (5 ft 3 in) Irish gauge
- Operating speed: 70 mph (110 km/h)

The Mallow–Tralee line runs from Mallow to Tralee Casement. Intermediate stations include Banteer, Millstreet, Rathmore, Killarney and Farranfore.

A peculiar arrangement at Killarney is in place, in which trains from Mallow enter Killarney, which is a dead-end. Trains continuing to Tralee then have to reverse until they reach the junction, before changing direction again to continue westwards.

Irish Rail's network statement gives the length of the line as 61.5 miles (99.0 km), though other sources give the length of the line as 62 1/4 miles instead. The line from Mallow to Killarney was noted for severe gradients compared to the line from Dublin to Mallow though the Killarney expresses of 1899 were timed to achieve the section at 40.75 miles per hour (65.58 km/h) westbound and 38.2 miles per hour (61.5 km/h) eastbound.

== History ==
Killarney Junction Railway Act 1846
- Act of Parliament
- Parliament of the United Kingdom
- Long title: An Act for making a Railway from the Town of Mallow to the Town of Killarney, to be called "The Killarney Junction Railway."
- Citation: 9 & 10 Vict. c. cc

Dates
- Royal assent: 16 July 1846

Other legislation
- Amended by: Killarney Junction Railway Act 1851

Killarney Junction Railway Act 1851
- Act of Parliament
- Parliament of the United Kingdom
- Long title: An Act to amend "The Killarney Junction Railway Act, 1846."
- Citation: 14 & 15 Vict. c. ciii

Dates
- Royal assent: 24 July 1851

Other legislation
- Amends: Killarney Junction Railway Act 1846

Text of statute as originally enacted

The Killarney Junction Railway (KJR) was authorised by the Killarney Junction Railway Act 1846 (9 & 10 Vict. c. cc) and completed the construction of the line from Mallow to the holiday resort of Killarney in 1853.

Tralee and Killarney Railway Act 1853
- Act of Parliament
- Parliament of the United Kingdom
- Citation: 16 & 17 Vict. c. clxxxix

Tralee and Killarney Railway Act 1854
- Act of Parliament
- Parliament of the United Kingdom
- Long title: An Act to alter the borrowing Powers of the Tralee and Killarney Railway Company.
- Citation: 20 & 21 Vict. c. xvii

Dates
- Royal assent: 26 June 1857

Text of statute as originally enacted

Tralee and Killarney Railway Act 1859
- Act of Parliament
- Parliament of the United Kingdom
- Long title: An Act for reviving the Powers and extending the Time for the Completion of the Railway and Works authorized by "The Tralee and Killarney Railway Act, 1853."
- Citation: 22 Vict. c. x

Dates
- Royal assent: 19 April 1859

The Tralee and Killarney Railway was authorised by the Tralee and Killarney Railway Act 1853 (16 & 17 Vict. c. clxxxix) and opened the extension from Killarney junction to Tralee in 1859.

The Great Southern and Western Railway (GS&WR) who had invested in both companies absorbed them both in 1860.

At Tralee there were small sidings that were convenient to those of the narrow gauge Tralee and Dingle Light Railway. There was also links beyond the road to the marshalling yards, the branch to Fenit, and the Limerick–Tralee line.

=== Rolling stock ===
Alexander McDonnell GS&WR Class 2 Kerry bogies were specifically intended for passenger services on the line. There was a trial of a Drumm Battery Train with temporary charging points set up on the line during the late 1930s or 1940s. 22000 Class ICR railcars first began passenger services on the line in September 2008.

== Branches ==
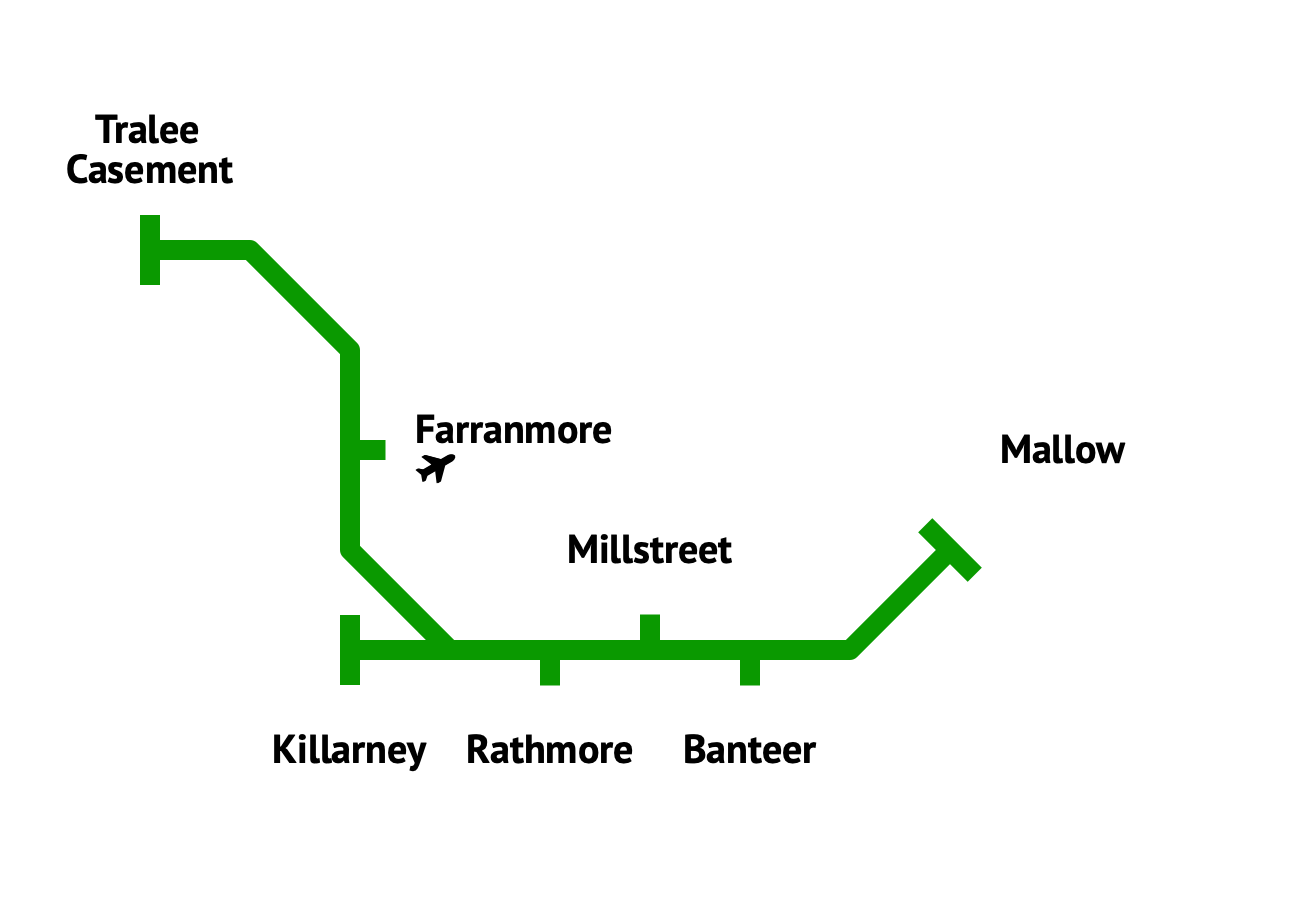
A non-geographical diagram of the Mallow - Tralee line.

=== Castleisland ===
The 4 miles (6.4 km) long Castleisland branch connected to the main line at Gortalea at a junction facing Tralee. It closed in 1974. Alexander McDonnell designed a combined engine and carriage, the GS&WR Class 90, to work the branch.

=== Kenmare ===
The branch to Kenmare was about 20 miles (32 km) long and was opened on 4 September 1893. It closed on 1 February 1960.

=== Newmarket ===
There was a 8 3/4 miles (14.1 km) branch to Newmarket from Banteer with an intermediate station at Kanturk. The line opened on 1 April 1889 which closed to passengers on 27 January 1947 and completely on 1 January 1963, though other sources say 4 February 1963.

=== Valentia ===
The terminus on the branch to Valentia Harbour was further west than any in Europe.

== Rail Air Link ==
The railway passes close by to Kerry Airport, with the station at Farranfore being located about 1 mile (1.6 km) away.
