= InterCity (Iarnród Éireann) =

Rail services in the Republic of Ireland

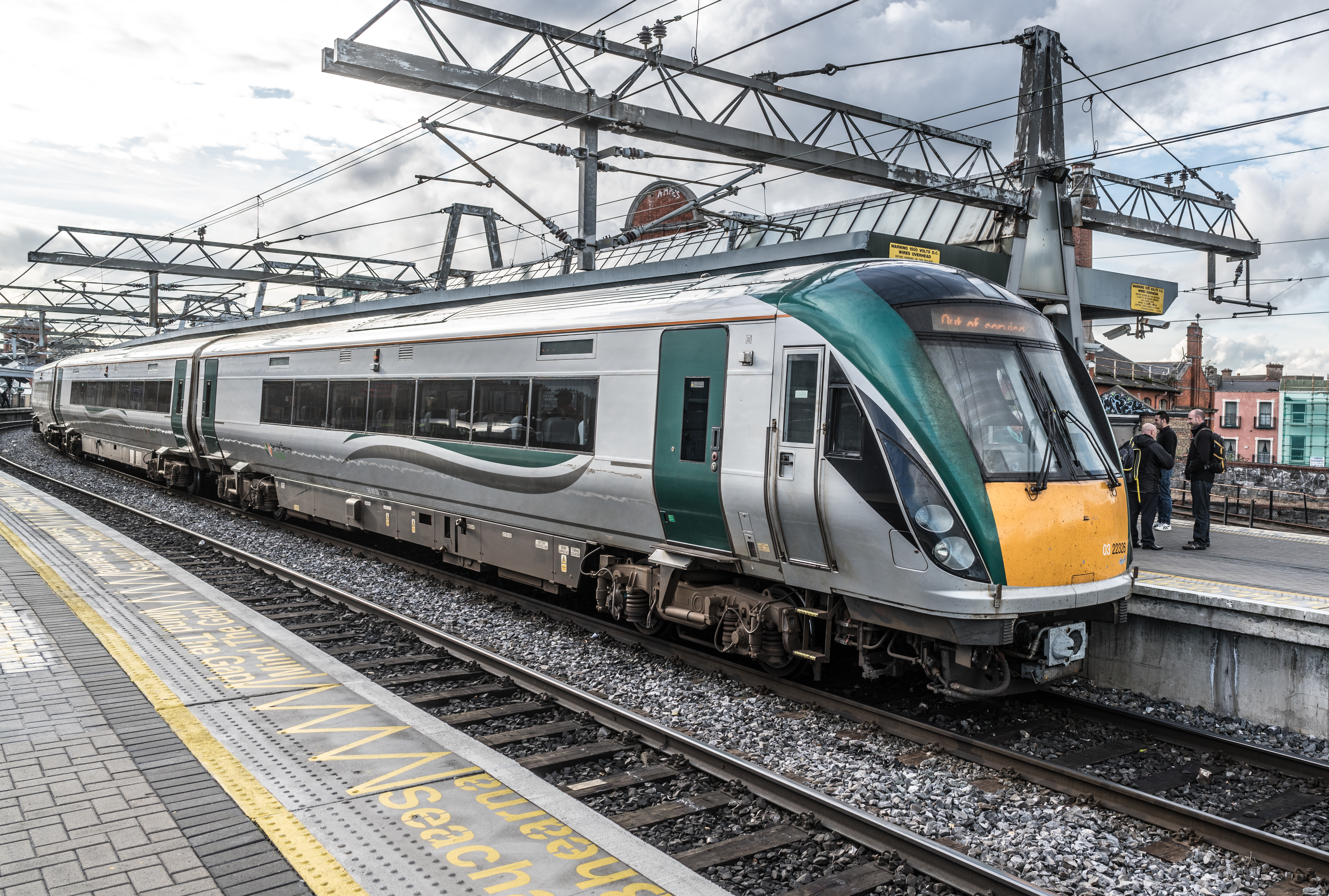
- A 22000 Class train at Dublin Connolly

Overview
- Status: Operational
- Owner: Iarnród Éireann
- Locale: Ireland
- Stations: 83

Service
- Type: InterCity
- System: Iarnród Éireann
- Services: 14
- Operator: Iarnród Éireann
- Rolling stock: 201 Class; Mark 4; 22000 Class

History
- Opened: 1972 (As Mainline); 1984 (As InterCity)

Technical
- Number of tracks: 1–6
- Track gauge: 1,600 mm (5 ft 3 in)
- Operating speed: 160 km/h (100 mph)

InterCity (Irish: IdirChathrach) is the brand name given to rail services operated by Iarnród Éireann that run between Dublin and other major cities in Ireland. InterCity branding is also used in other European countries by unaffiliated organizations.

== Services ==
InterCity services from Dublin operate from two main stations:

- Dublin Heuston – Heuston Station is the terminus for services to the south and west of Ireland. Services from Heuston operate to Cork, Galway, Waterford, Tralee, Westport and Limerick.
- Dublin Connolly – Connolly Station is the terminus for services to the east and north-west of Ireland. Services from Connolly operate to Sligo and Rosslare Europort. Dublin Connolly is also the terminus of the Dublin to Belfast main line, with services to Belfast Grand Central provided by Enterprise.

== Rolling stock ==
InterCity services are operated using a mixture of locomotive pulled coaching stock and DMUs. In 2006, deliveries began of 67 new Mark 4 coaches, specifically for the flagship Dublin-Cork route, in an order costing approximately €117 million. These are formed into 8 carriage trains, pulled by a 201 class locomotive, and operate an hourly service between Cork and Dublin. The entry into service of the Mark 4 stock allowed the Mark 3 coaching stock to be cascaded to other routes, allowing in turn the withdrawal of the elderly "Cravens" and Mark 2 coaches. In 2007, the first of a total 183 coaches of the new 22000 Class diesel multiple unit were delivered, of which 150 vehicles are for InterCity services, the remaining for use on Commuter routes, at a total cost of approximately €400 million. These trains, which are in 3-car, 4-car and 5-car formations, replaced the Mark 3 coaches formerly in use on the routes between Dublin and Limerick, Galway and Waterford and the 2800 Class and 29000 Class DMUs on the Dublin to Sligo and Dublin to Rosslare Europort services, and on the services that do not terminate in Dublin. The Commuter DMU rolling stock was then transferred to the expanded Commuter services from 2008 until 2012, when all 22000 Class DMUs had entered service. The first 22000 Class train entered service on 18 December 2007 on the service to Sligo. These DMUs now operate all Dublin-Sligo, Dublin-Tralee and Dublin-Limerick services, as well as all Dublin-Westport services and Dublin-Galway, Dublin-Waterford and Mallow/Cork-Tralee services. The final deliveries of the 22000 Class took place in 2012. As of 2016 all InterCity and many Commuter routes are operated with 22000 Class units, with the exclusion of most Cork-Dublin and Belfast-Dublin services.

=== Current fleet ===
Class	Image	Type	Top speed		Number	Routes operated	Built
Class	Image	Type	mph	km/h	Number	Routes operated	Built
201 Class		Diesel locomotive	100	160	32	Dublin-Cork, Dublin-Belfast	1994–1995
22000 Class		Diesel multiple unit	100	160	28 3-car, 25 4-car & 10 5-car sets	Cork-Tralee, Dublin-Belfast, Dublin-Cork, Dublin-Galway, Dublin-Limerick, Dublin-Rosslare, Dublin-Tralee, Dublin-Sligo, Dublin-Waterford, Dublin-Westport,	2007–2011
Mark 4		Passenger coaches	125	200	67	Dublin-Cork	2004–2005
Mark 4		Driving Van Trailer (DVT)	125	200	67	Dublin-Cork	2004–2005

==== Commuter stock ====
In addition to the dedicated InterCity rolling stock, a number of Commuter branded DMUs are used on rural routes that are classed as InterCity by Iarnród Éireann.

Class	Image	Type	Top speed		Number	Routes operated	Built
Class	Image	Type	mph	km/h	Number	Routes operated	Built
2600 Class		Diesel multiple unit	70	110	8	Cork Commuter Routes	1993
2800 Class		Diesel multiple unit	75	120	8	Cork & Limerick Commuter Routes	2000
29000 Class		Diesel multiple unit	75	120	29	Dublin-Rosslare, Dublin Commuter	2002–2005

=== Past Fleet ===
Class	Image	Type	Top speed		Number	Routes operated	Built	Withdrawn	Notes
Class	Image	Type	mph	km/h	Number	Routes operated	Built	Withdrawn	Notes
121 Class		Diesel locomotive	77	124	15	Dublin-Galway; Dublin-Sligo; Dublin-Waterford; Limerick-Limerick Junction	1960–1961	1995–2008	124 is now preserved by DCDR & B134 undergoing overhaul
Mark 2		Passenger coaches	100	161	72	All routes	1972–1989	2004–2008	Based on the British Rail Mark 2
Mark 3		Passenger coaches	125	200	133	All routes	1980–1989	2006–2009	Based on the British Rail Mark 3
181 Class		Diesel locomotive	75	120	12	All routes	1966	1991–2009	190 is now preserved by DCDR
141 Class		Diesel locomotive	76	123	37	All routes	1962	2010–2011	2 preserved at DCDR & 3 preserved by RPSI & 4 stored at Inchicore works.
071 Class		Diesel locomotive	90	145	18	All routes	1976	2010–2011	Still in use on mixed traffic services; also used on railtours.

== Future ==
=== Western Rail corridor ===
The Department of Transport's project proposed that several hundred million euros would be invested by the Irish Government in improving the railway network. This would see connection of some of the radial lines out of Dublin, which enable inter-regional services to be operated without travelling through the capital. A major part of this included plans for the reinstatement of the Western Rail Corridor between Ennis and Claremorris, a route totalling 110 km/68.5 miles.

- Stage 1 – Ennis to Athenry – Completed
- Stage 2 – Athenry to Claremorris (Via Tuam) – Project in motion
- Stage 3 – Claremorris to Collooney – Deferred indefinitely

If stages 2 and 3 were completed, the Westport, Galway and Limerick lines from Dublin would be connected, allowing regional InterCity services to be run between these destinations without having to travel via Dublin.

Stage 1 of the project began on 16 November 2007, relaying track between Ennis and Athenry, a distance of approximately 60 km/36 miles.

The WRC project has been widely criticised as passenger numbers have been extremely low, with critics saying it would be cheaper for Irish Rail to put each passenger in a taxi than running the train. Rhetoric aside the line has seen massive growth as reported in the Irish Times: "Of particular note was the growth in passenger numbers on the western rail corridor, which saw a 72.5 per cent increase from 29,000 to 50,000 journeys through the Ennis- Athenry section of the line." Almost 100,000 people used the service between Ennis and Galway in 2017. 390,000 travelled on the line between Limerick and Galway in 2018. Passenger numbers are up 22.9% in the first quarter of 2019, and the line is expected to carry 420,000 people this year.

=== Dublin-Cork ===
Iarnród Éireann also maintains an ambition to increase speeds on the Dublin-Cork line. The current Mark 4 coaches are capable speeds of up to 125 mph, but are limited to 100 mph, because of speed restrictions on the track. In order to achieve the desired higher speed, the infrastructure of the line would have to be upgraded.

In 2015 further upgrade plans were announced. Iarnród Éireann's chief executive David Franks outlined how ballast was to be renewed between Hazelhatch and Kildare, which was to allow 160 km/h (100 mph) running on the 80 km (50 mi) long stretch. Further upgrades such as the removal of level crossings and bridge replacements are expected to bring journey times from Cork to Dublin to under 2 hours.

=== Dublin congestion ===
Iarnród Éireann's ambition to increase both service speed and service frequency is limited by capacity issues at Dublin Connolly. The Loopline Bridge that links Connolly with Dublin Pearse is a two track route that is currently operating at the limit of its capacity, while Connolly is also used as the terminus for a number of InterCity and Commuter services. The current Docklands station was built to ease the congestion at Connolly by providing an alternate terminus for Commuter services to the M3 Parkway. IÉ's plan initially involved the rebuilding of Dublin Broadstone to serve as a terminus for Commuter services to the west of the capital. However, in March 2008, the Government decided that the track bed leading from Liffey Junction would be used for an extension to the Luas rather than for heavy rail. To compensate, the transport minister announced that Iarnród Éireann would be permitted to obtain planning permission to keep Docklands open permanently as the terminus for Maynooth, Navan and Mullingar services, as well as potential services from Galway. The construction of the DART Underground would enable DART services to be spread over two lines, rather than all being routed through Connolly. The DART Underground project was shelved in 2011, and, as of 2021, not scheduled for any development or funding until "after 2042".

=== Other services ===
The three counties in Ulster that are part of the Republic of Ireland, Donegal, Cavan and Monaghan, are the only counties with no railway connection at all. The closest railway station to Donegal is Derry Waterside in Northern Ireland, while the closure of several of the cross-border lines by the Northern Ireland Government led to Cavan and Monaghan losing their rail services in the 1960s. Iarnród Éireann and the government have both been criticised for not considering a restoration of the railway to Donegal, with Donegal County Council stating their commitment to bringing about a return of the rail network to the county by connecting Letterkenny to both Sligo and Derry, to maximise the "Gateway Status" awarded to the three towns. In May 2008, Conor Murphy, the Minister for Regional Development in the Northern Ireland Executive, announced a study in conjunction with Donegal County Council into the effects of restoring railway services in the north-west, with a view to potentially returning the railway to Donegal. The idea of restoring the railways to the North-West of Ireland has been gathering momentum, with Monaghan County Council deciding to investigate the idea in 2009, while Donegal has floated the idea of involving not only the three Ulster counties south of the border, but also Sligo, which formerly had extensive rail links to counties further north, and Fermanagh and Tyrone in Northern Ireland.
