= Farranfore–Valentia Harbour line =

Former railway line in Ireland

Coordinates: 52.03128°N 10.06850°W

Farranfore–Valentia Harbour
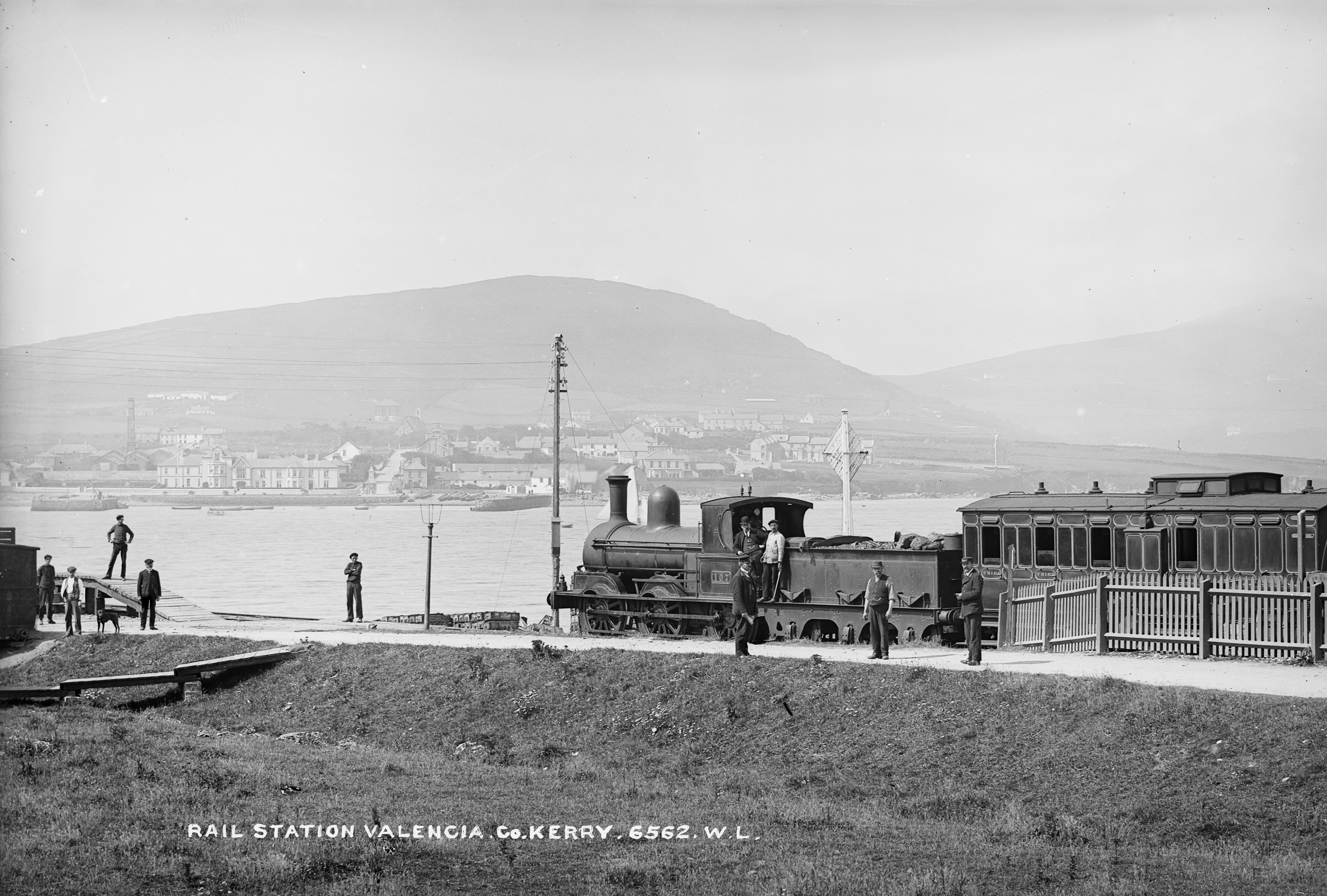
- Locomotive No 107 at Valentia Harbour

Overview
- Termini: Farranfore; Valentia Harbour

History
- Opened: 1885 (Farranfore–Killorglin); 1895 (Killorglin–Valentia Harbour)
- Closed: 1960

Technical
- Line length: 39.5 mi (63.6 km)
- Number of tracks: 1
- Track gauge: 5 ft 3 in (1,600 mm) Irish gauge
- Operating speed: 50 mph (80 km/h)

The Farranfore–Valentia Harbour line (Note: Casserley noted Valentia was often spelt Valencia) was a 39.5 miles (63.6 km) long single-track broad gauge railway line that operated from 1892 to 1960 along Dingle Bay's southern shore in Ireland. It was the most westerly railway in Europe. (Note: Bairstow notes the Monte Railway (1893–1943) in Madeira has a claim to the most westerly in Europe record, though it is slightly different in being a metre gauge rack railway. Baker claims the Tralee and Dingle Light Railway was further west than Valentia Harbour, while Bairstow specifically claims that was not so by a small margin.)

== History ==
Killarney and Valencia Railway Act 1847
- Act of Parliament
- Parliament of the United Kingdom
- Long title: An Act for making a Railway from the Town of Killarney, in the County of Kerry, to the Harbour of Valencia, in the same County.
- Citation: 10 & 11 Vict. c. lxiii

Dates
- Royal assent: 25 June 1847

Text of statute as originally enacted

Killarney and Valencia Railway Act 1851
- Act of Parliament
- Parliament of the United Kingdom
- Long title: An Act to authorize a Deviation in the Line of the Killarney and Valencia Railway, and to continue and revive the Powers granted by "The Killarney and Valencia Railway Act, 1847," for the compulsory Purchase of Lands, and to extend the Period by such Act limited for the Completion of the said Railway.
- Citation: 14 & 15 Vict. c. xliv

Dates
- Royal assent: 3 July 1851

Text of statute as originally enacted

A plan – the Killarney and Valencia Railway – to extend the 1834 Dublin and Kingstown Railway to Valentia Harbour by that railway's engineer, Charles Blacker Vignoles, for the establishment of a transatlantic port, was approved by the Killarney and Valencia Railway Act 1847 (10 & 11 Vict. c. lxiii), but it was to prove too ambitious and came to nothing.

And be it enacted, That the Railway shall commence at or near the Avenue in the Townland of Avenue in the Parish of Killarney in the County of Kerry, and shall pass through the following Places, (that is to say,) Killarney, Aghadoe, Kilbonane, Knockane, Killorglin, Glenbehy, Killinane, and Caher, and shall terminate near the East Bank of the Harbour of Valencia in the Parish of Cahir in the said County of Kerry. — Section 20, Killarney and Valencia Railway Act 1847 (10 & 11 Vict. c. lxiii)

Killorglin Railway Act 1871
- Act of Parliament
- Parliament of the United Kingdom
- Long title: An Act for making a Railway in the county of Kerry, from Killorglin to the Farranfore Station of the Great Southern and Western Railway; and for other purposes.
- Citation: 34 & 35 Vict. c. clxxvii

Dates
- Royal assent: 31 July 1871

Text of statute as originally enacted

Killorglin Railway Act 1880
- Act of Parliament
- Parliament of the United Kingdom
- Long title: An Act to revive and amend the powers of the Killorglin Railway Act, 1871, for making a Railway in the county of Kerry from the Farranfore Station of the Great Southern and Western Railway to Killorglin, to provide for a Baronial Guarantee with reference to the Railway; and for other purposes.
- Citation: 43 & 44 Vict. c. clviii

Dates
- Royal assent: 12 August 1880

Text of statute as originally enacted

The Great Southern and Western Railway Company (GS&WR) had opened its Killarney to Tralee section in 1859, and the independent Killorglin Railway Company was formed by the Killorglin Railway Act 1871 (34 & 35 Vict. c. clxxvii) to construct a line from the GS&WR Farranfore station but in the event was unable to raise the finance.

The railway herein-before referred to and authorised by this Act is—

- A railway eleven miles and six furlongs in length or thereabouts, commencing by a junction with the Great Southern and Western Railway at Farranfore Station on said railway, and terminating at the north side of the quay on the east side of the river Laune, which quay is one hundred yards or thereabouts below the bridge at Killorglin over said river, at a point fifty yards or thereabouts measured in an easterly direction from the north-west corner of said quay.

— Section 26, Killorglin Railway Act 1871 (34 & 35 Vict. c. clxxvii)

Great Southern and Western Railway (Killorglin Railway Transfer) Act 1881
- Act of Parliament
- Parliament of the United Kingdom
- Long title: An Act for the transfer of the Powers of the Killorglin Railway Company to the Great Southern and Western Railway Company; and for other purposes.
- Citation: 44 & 45 Vict. c. clxxxi

Dates
- Royal assent: 11 August 1881

The GS&WR was to acquire that authority to build the line by the Great Southern and Western Railway (Killorglin Railway Transfer) Act 1881 (44 & 45 Vict. c. clxxxi), and opened the 12.5-mile-long (20.1 km) rail link between Farranfore and Iveragh Road in Killorglin with the Irish gauge of 5 ft 3 in (1,600 mm) on 15 January 1885. The line was extended by 27 miles (43 km) to Valentia Harbour commencing in 1890 and formally opened on 12 September 1893. The branch line left the Mallow–Tralee line at Farranfore and headed west through some of Ireland's most spectacular scenery as it climbed through County Kerry's mountainous countryside, along Dingle Bay's southern shore. It served as the main transport system for the Iveragh Peninsula for 75 years. The last train departed Killorglin on 30 January 1960, and the line was closed on 1 February 1960.

The Laune Viaduct in Killorglin, two tunnels, and the Gleensk Viaduct are still standing. Most of its other buildings have been demolished and their sites were used for other purposes. It was announced in June 2013 that the section of the disused and disassembled railway linking Cahirciveen to Reenard would be signed over by Irish Rail's parent company, CIÉ to Kerry County Council for building the 3.57-mile-long (5.75 km) Fertha greenway, a combined walking and cycling path which features on Lonely Planet's best things to do in time.

== Route ==
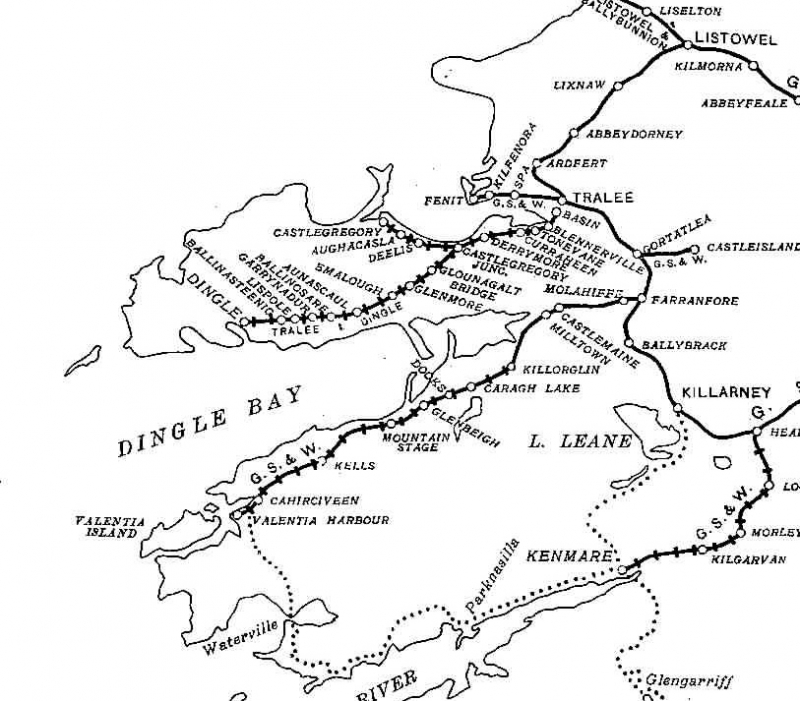
Farranfore to Valentia Harbour line

The station at Farranfore is orientated in an approximately north-south direction, with the down platform to Tralee to the west and the up platform to Mallow and Dublin to the east. There was a bay platform at the southern end of the down used by trains to and from Valentia Harbour which branched away to the southwest. The 12.5 miles (20.1 km) section to Killorglin was essentially flat,. It had an intermediate stations at Molahiffe, Castlemaine (GSWR) and Milltown Halt with the Laune Viaduct just before Killorglin; 50 miles per hour (80 km/h) maximum speed permitted from Molahiffe.

The 27 miles (43 km) extension ran to Valentia Harbour where a ferry was available to Valentia Island. The gradient was up to 1 in 50 on this section, and speeds were mostly restricted to 30 miles per hour (48 km/h) or less for the most part. The first two halts were at Caragh Lake and Dooks, 16 miles (26 km) and 18 miles (29 km) from Farranfore respectively. Glenbeigh, at 20 miles (32 km) was a passing stage with locomotive water replenishment facilities was succeeded by a sustained climb at 1 in 50 to Mountain Stage at 23.5 miles (37.8 km). Kells at 30.5 miles (49.1 km) also had a train passing loop and was succeeded by a 40 miles per hour (64 km/h) stretch of track to Cahirciveen 6 miles (9.7 km) further on.

The terminus at Valentia Harbour was a simple arrangement with a shed and no turntable, engines working the 2.5 miles (4.0 km) back to Cahirciveen for stabling overnight.

== Rolling stock ==
Locomotives used had to be suitable for the low axle load, which even as of 1948 was 14.5 long tons (14.7 t). While the line was initially worked by 4-4-2T and 2-4-2T types the ubiquitous Class 101/J15 came to dominate, several of which were based at Tralee.

The first two 550 hp C Class diesels, Nos. C201 and C202, were put to work on the branch on 4 March 1957, only just having arrived in Ireland at the start of the previous month, with CIÉ 2600 Class railcars also noted as having worked excursions to the branch.

Six-wheeled passenger coaches (Note: The six-wheeled would be short, typically 30 feet (9.1 m)) were used throughout the life of the line, its sharp curves meaning eight-wheeled bogie coaches only being permitted past Killorglin after 1935, and only then if they had oval buffers or round buffers of not less than 18 inches (46 cm) diameter.

== Services ==
When the line opened there were initially three passenger trains each away to Killorglin. By 1954 the service was reduced to a daily single passenger train each way taking two and a quarter hours for the c. 40 miles (64 km) trip from Farranfore to Valentia Harbour, supplemented by two slower goods train that had passenger accommodation for all or part of the journey.

== Gallery ==
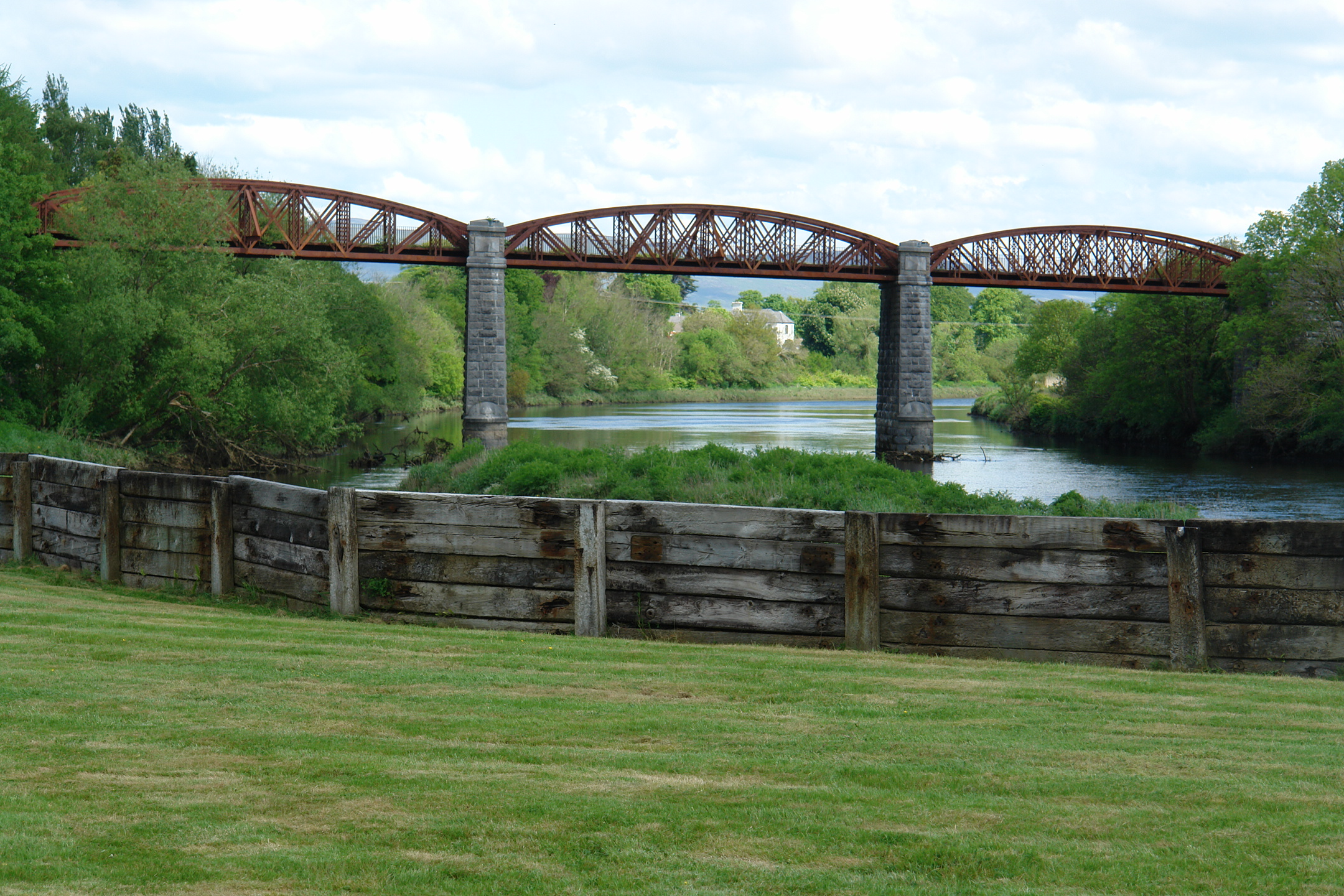
Laune Viaduct of the Killorglin to Valentia Railway in Killorglin

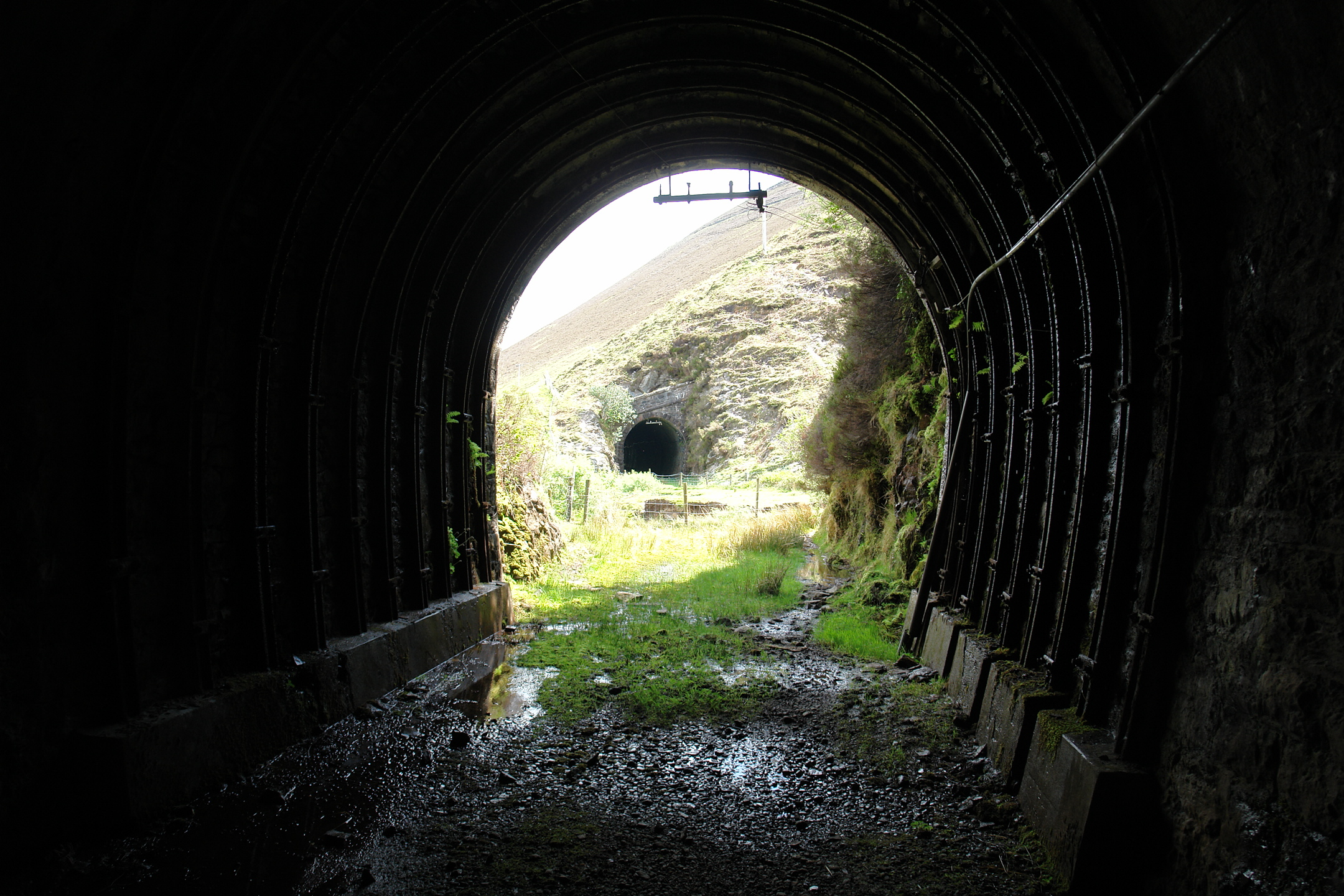
Tunnels of the Killorglin to Valentia Railway

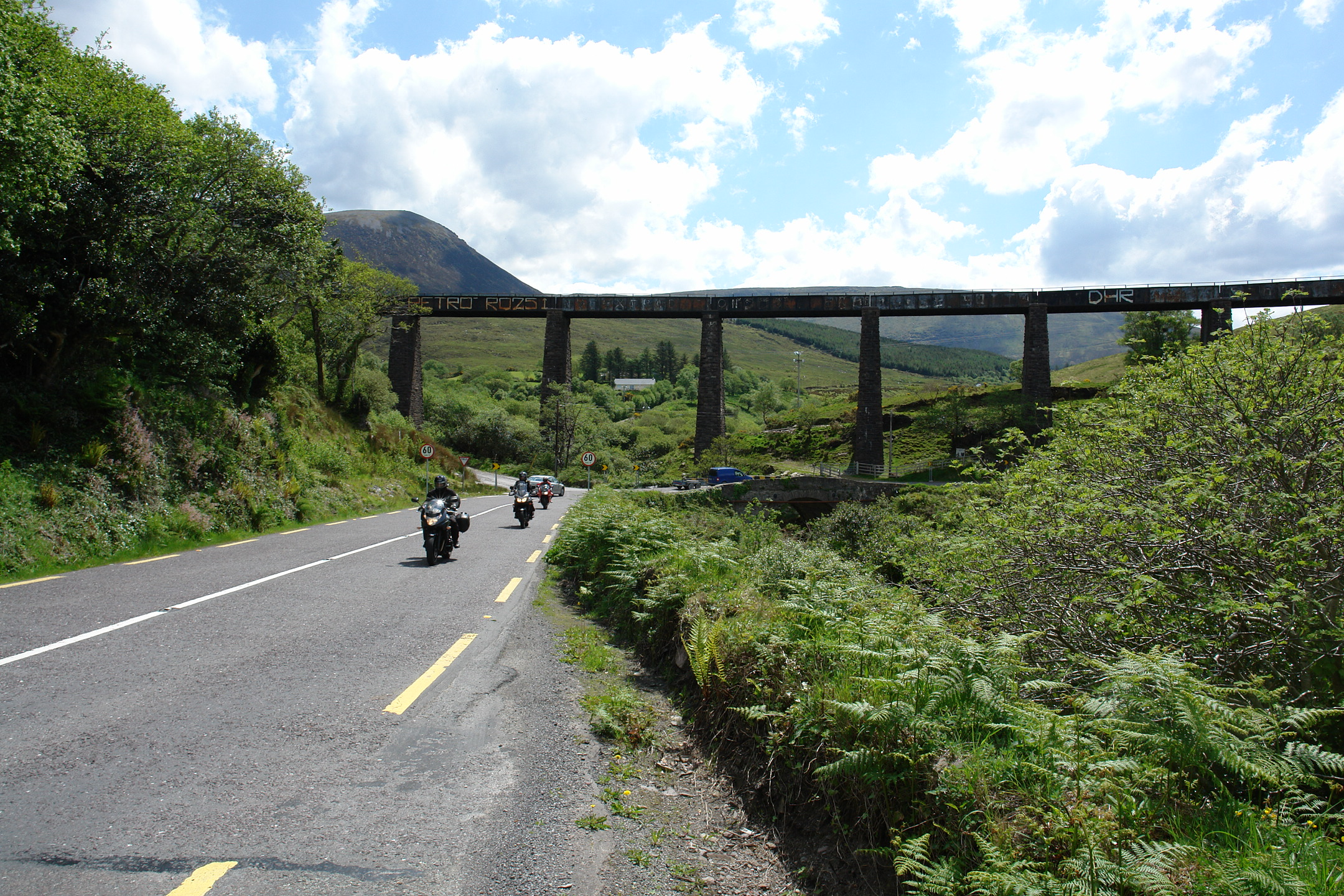
Gleensk Railway Viaduct

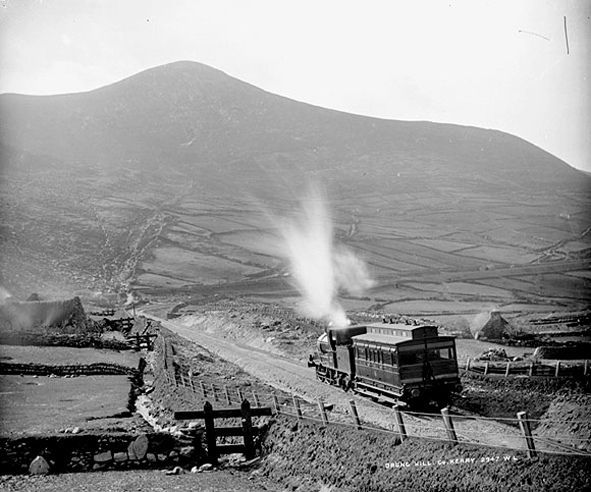
Drung Hill with inspection car likely about 1893
