= Laune Viaduct =

Coordinates: 52.1103°N 9.7835°W

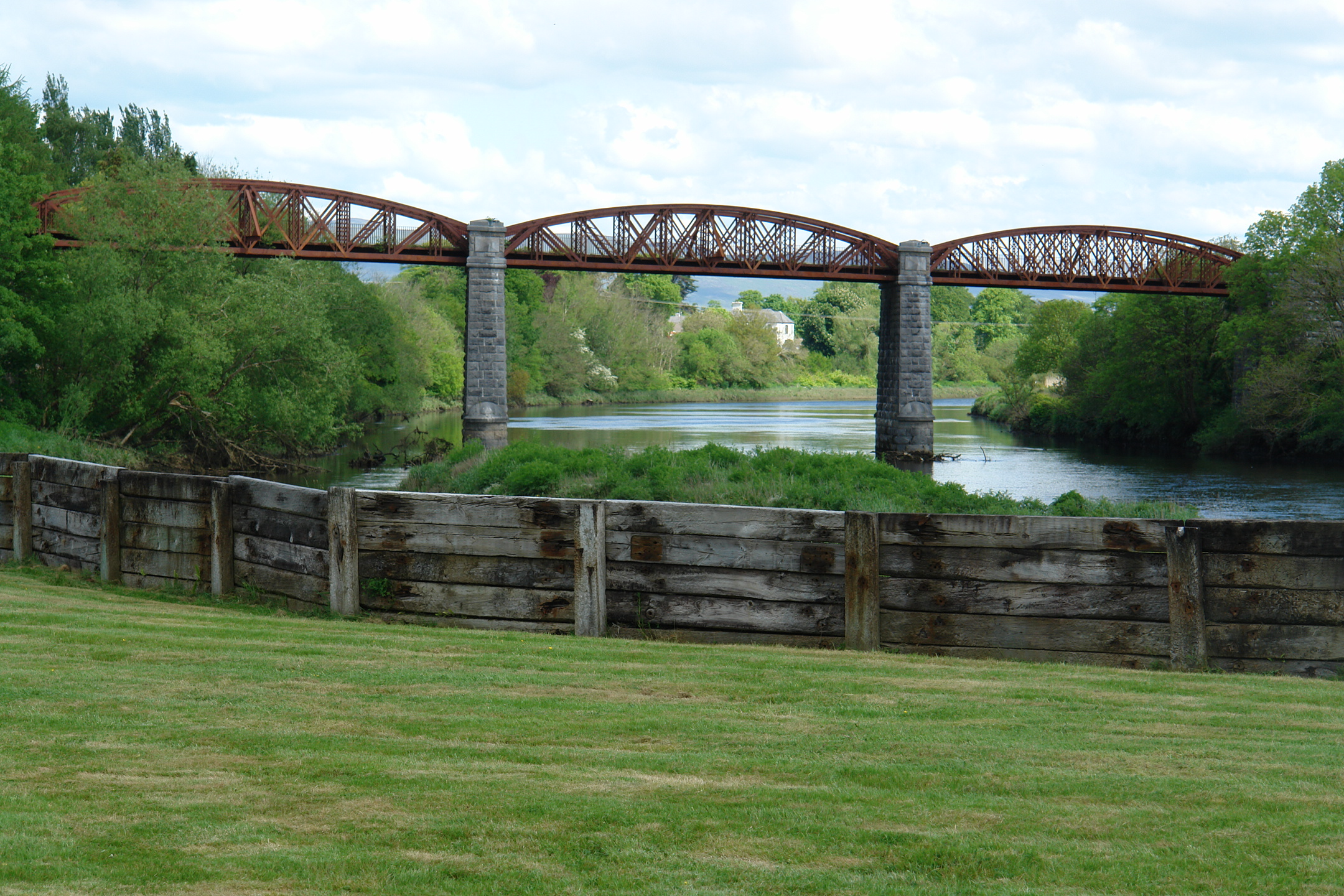
Laune Viaduct on the former Farranfore to Valentia Harbour Railway in Killorglin

The Laune Viaduct is a 19th-century bridge in Killorglin, County Kerry, Ireland. Known locally as the "Metal Bridge", the bridge was designed by S. G. Frazier.

The viaduct was located along the Great Southern and Western Railway's branch line from Farranfore to Valentia Harbour.

Described in the National Inventory of Architectural Heritage as a "Five-span rock-hewn limestone-built railway viaduct", the bridge opened in 1885. The viaduct spans the River Laune and has single-arch sections to the east and to the west with limestone and red brick voussoirs. A three-span section leads to the centre with bow-string cast-iron girders on tapered limestone piers. The three metal spans are each 95 ft long, each consisting of pairs of twin cross braced bow-string girders of part N-truss and part latticed members. The piers and bridge abutments are made of local limestone.

The bridge was repaired in 1950 and closed in 1960. Renovations in 1993 were made to accommodate its use as footbridge.
