= Killorglin railway station =

Station in County Kerry, Ireland

Killorglin

General information
- Location: Killorglin, County Kerry; Ireland

History
- Original company: Great Southern and Western Railway
- Pre-grouping: Great Southern and Western Railway
- Post-grouping: Great Southern and Western Railway

Key dates
- 15 February 1885: Station opens
- 1 February 1960: Station closes
Location

Killorglin railway station was on the Great Southern and Western Railway branch line which ran from Farranfore to Valentia Harbour in the Republic of Ireland.

== History ==
The station was opened on 15 January 1885.

The station closed on 1 February 1960. As part of its rote there was a bridge named today by locals as the Iron bridge

Preceding station	Historical railways	Following station
Milltown Halt	Great Southern and Western Railway; Farranfore-Valentia Harbour	Caragh Lake
