= Mountain Stage railway station =

Railway station in Glenbeigh, Ireland

Mountain Stage

General information
- Location: County Kerry; Ireland

History
- Original company: Great Southern and Western Railway
- Pre-grouping: Great Southern and Western Railway
- Post-grouping: Great Southern and Western Railway

Key dates
- 12 September 1893: Station opens
- 1 February 1960: Station closes
Location

Mountain Stage railway station was on the Great Southern and Western Railway which ran from Farranfore to Valentia Harbour in Ireland.

== History ==
The station was opened on 12 September 1893.

The station closed on 1 February 1960.

Preceding station	Historical railways	Following station
Glenbeigh	Great Southern and Western Railway; Farranfore-Valentia Harbour	Kells
