= Cahersiveen railway station =

Former railway station in Kerry, Ireland

Cahersiveen
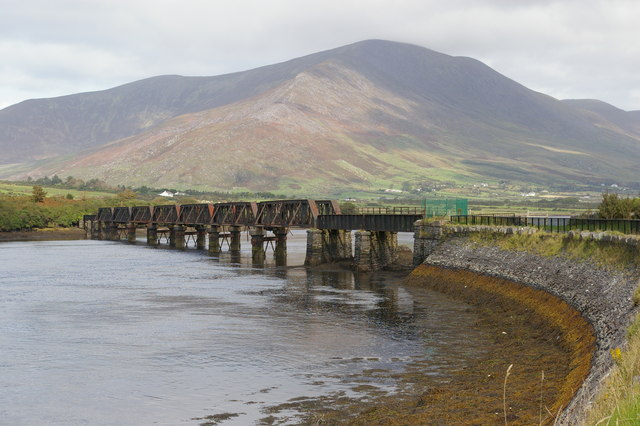
- Viaduct just north of the station. Photograph taken on 15 September 2008

General information
- Location: Cahersiveen, County Kerry; Ireland
- Coordinates: 51.94836°N 10.2277°W
- Elevation: 4.3 metres (14 ft)
- Platforms: 1

History
- Original company: Great Southern and Western Railway
- Pre-grouping: Great Southern Railways
- Post-grouping: CIÉ

Key dates
- 12 September 1893: Station opens
- 1 February 1960: Station closes
Location

Cahersiveen railway station was on the Great Southern and Western Railway (GS&WR) which ran from Farranfore to Valentia Harbour in the Republic of Ireland. The station served Cahersiveen in County Kerry.

== History ==
The station was opened on 12 September 1893.

Cahersiveen was the main station towards the end of the branch, and was equipped with locomotive shed and turntable. The final train of the day to Valentia would be returned the 4 kilometres (2.5 mi) from the harbour and stabled overnight, to be returned the next day.

Cahersiveen was the principal settlement in the area, having 1,800 inhabitants and two hotels. Horse-drawn buses, then later charabancs, would be available from the nearly hotel to take tourists round the Ring of Kerry scenic route.

The station closed on 1 February 1960, the last service train having run on 30 January 1960.

== Route ==
| Preceding station | Historical railways | Following station |
|---|---|---|
| Kells | Great Southern and Western Railway; Farranfore-Valentia Harbour line | Valentia Harbour |
