= Molahiffe railway station =

Former railway station in County Kerry, Ireland

Molahiffe

General information
- Location: County Kerry; Ireland

History
- Original company: Great Southern and Western Railway
- Pre-grouping: Great Southern and Western Railway
- Post-grouping: Great Southern and Western Railway

Key dates
- 15 January 1885: Station opens
- 1 February 1960: Station closes
Location

Molahiffe railway station was on the Great Southern and Western Railway which ran from Farranfore to Valentia Harbour in the Republic of Ireland.

== History ==
The station was opened on 15 January 1885.

The station closed on 1 February 1960.

Preceding station	Historical railways	Following station
Farranfore	Great Southern and Western Railway; Farranfore-Valentia Harbour	Castlemaine
