= Kells railway station (County Kerry) =

Railway station in County Kerry, Ireland

Kells
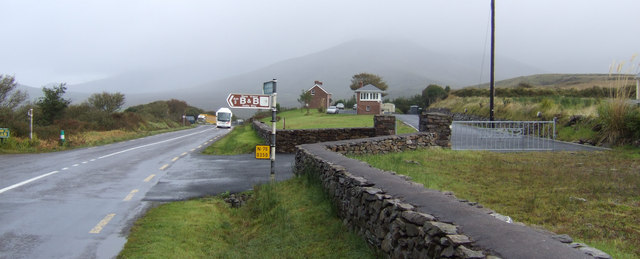
- The station at Kells was at the Gortnagree Crossing, 30.25 miles (48.68 km) from Farranfore.

General information
- Location: County Kerry; Ireland
- Coordinates: 51.997995°N 10.113037°W
- Elevation: 410 ft (120 m)
- Platforms: 2
- Tracks: 2

History
- Original company: Great Southern and Western Railway
- Pre-grouping: Great Southern and Western Railway
- Post-grouping: Great Southern and Western Railway

Key dates
- 12 September 1893: Station opens
- 1 February 1960: Station closes
Location

Kells railway station was on the Great Southern and Western Railway which ran from Farranfore to Valentia Harbour in the Republic of Ireland.

== History ==
The station was opened on 12 September 1893.

The station closed on 1 February 1960.

Preceding station	Historical railways	Following station
Mountain Stage	Great Southern and Western Railway; Farranfore-Valentia Harbour	Cahirciveen
