= Caragh Lake railway station =

Railway station in Ireland

Caragh Lake

General information
- Location: County Kerry; Ireland
- Coordinates: 52.077779°N 9.8565°W
- Elevation: 125 ft (38 m)

History
- Original company: Great Southern and Western Railway
- Pre-grouping: Great Southern and Western Railway
- Post-grouping: Great Southern and Western Railway

Key dates
- 12 September 1893: Station opens
- 1 February 1960: Station closes
Location

Caragh Lake railway station was on the Great Southern and Western Railway which ran from Farranfore to Valentia Harbour in the Republic of Ireland.

== History ==
The station was opened on 12 September 1893.

The station closed on 1 February 1960.

Preceding station	Historical railways	Following station
Killorglin	Great Southern and Western Railway; Farranfore-Valentia Harbour	Dooks
