= Milltown Halt railway station =

Railway station in Ireland

Milltown Halt

General information
- Location: County Kerry; Ireland

History
- Original company: Great Southern and Western Railway
- Pre-grouping: Great Southern and Western Railway
- Post-grouping: Great Southern and Western Railway

Key dates
- 1 November 1886: Station opens
- 1 February 1960: Station closes
Location

Milltown Halt railway station was on the Great Southern and Western Railway which ran from Farranfore to Valentia Harbour in the Republic of Ireland.

== History ==
The station was opened on 15 January 1885.

The station closed on 1 February 1960.

| Preceding station | Historical railways | Following station |
|---|---|---|
| Castlemaine | Great Southern and Western Railway; Farranfore-Valentia Harbour | Killorglin |
