= Dooks railway station =

Railway station in Glenbeigh, Ireland

Dooks

General information
- Location: County Kerry; Ireland
- Platforms: 1

History
- Original company: Great Southern and Western Railway
- Pre-grouping: Great Southern and Western Railway
- Post-grouping: Great Southern Railways

Key dates
- 1 May 1897: Station opens
- 1 February 1960: Station closes

Dooks railway station was on the Great Southern and Western Railway which ran from Farranfore to Valentia Harbour in the Republic of Ireland. Trains were not able to pass at this station on the single track line.

== History ==
The station was opened on 1 May 1897.

In the 1954 timetable the station was listed as Dooks Halt and some trains had to be requested to stop by signalled request.

The station closed on 1 February 1960.

| Preceding station | Historical railways | Following station |
|---|---|---|
| Caragh Lake | Great Southern and Western Railway; Farranfore-Valentia Harbour | Glenbeigh |
