= Ballymalis Castle =

- Caisleán Bhéal Átha Málais (Irish)
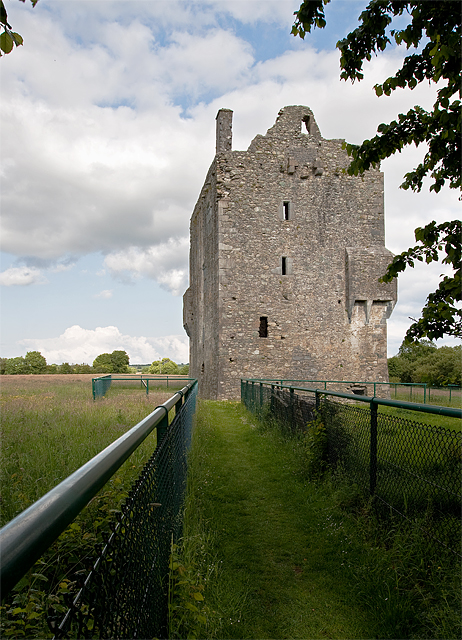

- Location within Ireland
- 52.084527°N 9.692390°W
- Type: tower house
- Location: Ballymalis, Beaufort, County Kerry, Ireland

History
- Built: early 16th century

Site notes
- Owner: State

National monument of Ireland
- Official name: Ballymalis Castle
- Reference no.: 364

Ballymalis Castle is a tower house and National Monument located in County Kerry, Ireland.

== Location ==
Ballymalis Castle is located 4.3 km (2.7 mi) northwest of Beaufort, on the north bank of the River Laune, near its confluence with the River Gaddagh. The Ring of Kerry runs to the north.

== History ==
This castle was built in the early 16th century by the Ó Muircheartaigh (O'Moriartys). It later passed to the Ó Fearghuis (Ferrises), who renovated it in the late 16th century. In 1677 the manor was confiscated by the British Crown and granted to Sir Francis Brewster, who granted it to the Eager (Eagar) family.

== Building ==
This is a tower house, partially restored. It is rectangular, with four storeys and an attic, with bartizans in the southwest and northeast corners. Also featured are slopestones, a machicolation, chimneys, fireplaces and decorated windows with mullions and transoms. Some of the alure (wall-walk) survives.

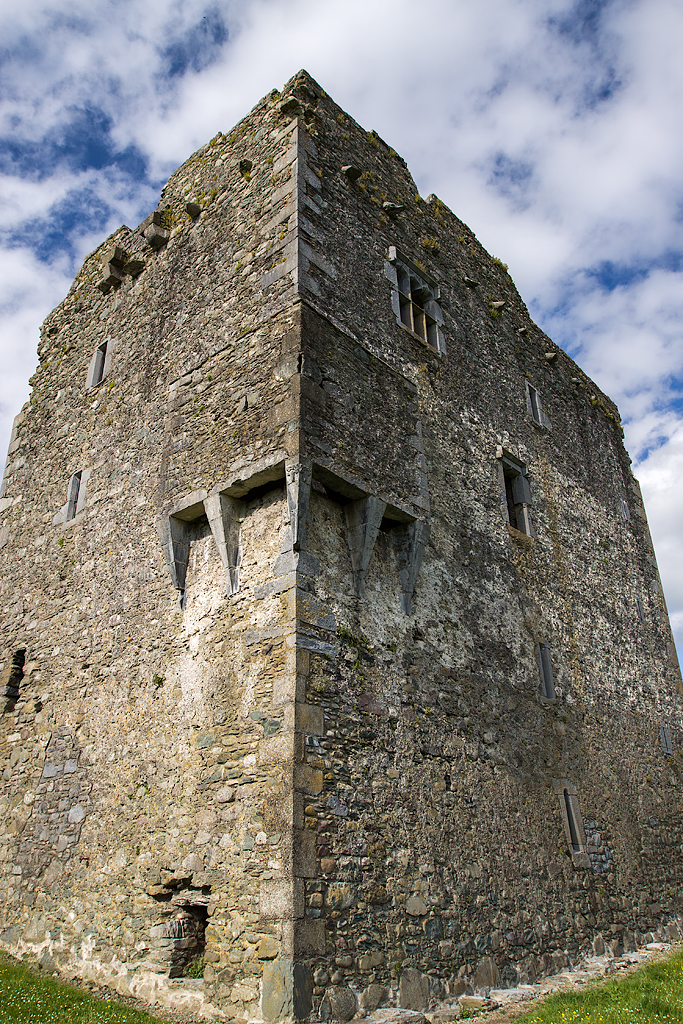

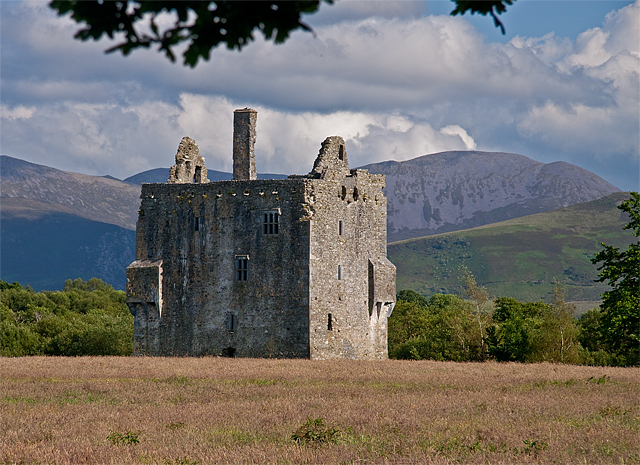

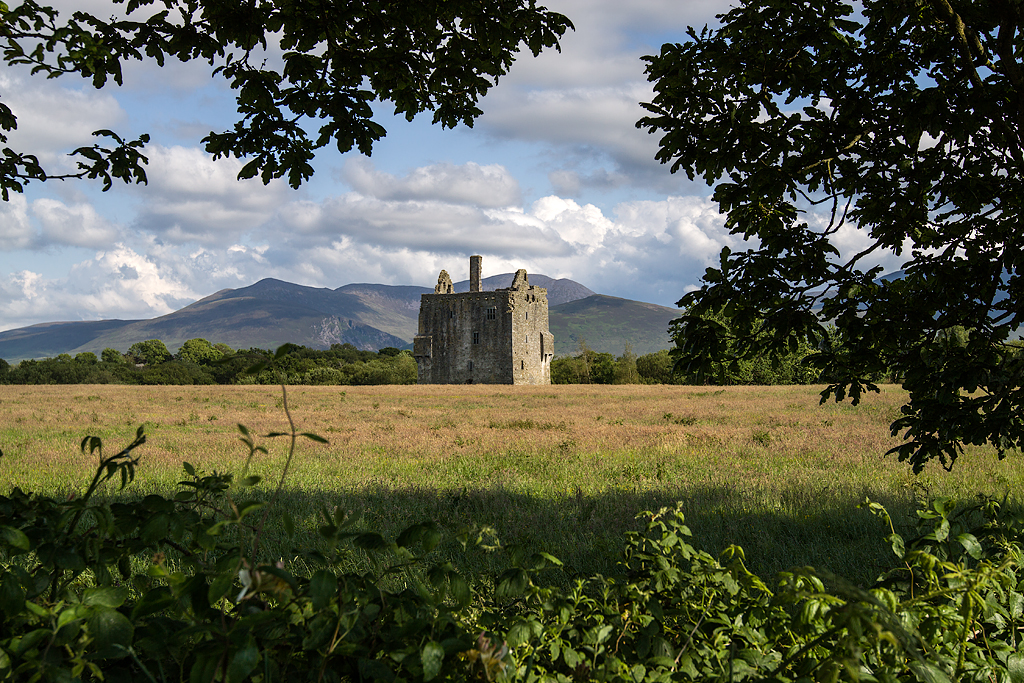
