= Jerry O'Mahoney =

Irish Gaelic footballer

Personal information
- Born: Reenard, County Kerry

Sport
- Sport: Gaelic football
- Position: Midfield
Club
- Years: Club
- 1960's-180's: Renard
Club titles
- London titles: 6
- Britain titles: 5
Inter-county
- Years: County
- Kerry London
Inter-county titles
- Britain titles: 0
- All-Irelands: 0
- NFL: 0
- All Stars: 0

Jerry O'Mahoney (born 19?? in Reenard, County Kerry) was an Irish sportsperson. He plays Gaelic football with his local club Renard and Kerry before he immigrated to London.

Jerry played minor and Under 21 for Kerry before he emigrated to London in 1970. He was one of the stars as London beat Dublin in the Junior All Ireland final of 1971 and played for London in the Connaught Championship.

At club level, he played with The Kingdom club. He won six London senior Championships, five senior leagues, five Club Championships of Britain and two All Ireland 7-a-sides.

Arguably the greatest Kerry footballer ever to play in England. In 2011 he was picked on the All Star London team 1960–2010.
