= Killian Young =

Kerry Gaelic footballer

Personal information
- Native name: Cillian de Shiún (Irish)
- Born: 4 January 1987 (age 39) Reenard, Ireland
- Occupation: Bank Manager
- Height: 1.83 m (6 ft 0 in)

Sport
- Sport: Gaelic football
- Position: Left half back
Club
- Years: Club
- 1995–: Renard
Club titles
- Kerry titles: 3
Inter-county
Years	County	Apps (scores)
2006–2019	Kerry	45
Inter-county titles
- Munster titles: 9
- All-Irelands: 4
- NFL: 2

Killian Young (born 4 January 1987 in Tralee) is an Irish sportsman. He plays Gaelic football with his local club Renard, contests the County Championship with divisional side South Kerry, and was a member of the Kerry senior football team from 2006 to 2019.

Having appeared for Kerry in the All-Ireland Minor Football Championship and All-Ireland Under-21 Football Championship, Young made his Kerry senior championship debut in 2006, breaking into the team in 2007. He filled the number 7 jersey when Aidan O'Mahony moved to centre-back to replace Séamus Moynihan. Young played there in the National Football League and retained his place for the All-Ireland Senior Football Championship. He was a member of the Kerry team that won Munster and then the All-Ireland that year, and won Young Player of the Year. He captained Kerry to the 2008 All-Ireland Under-21 Football Championship. He won another senior All-Ireland in 2009 when Kerry overcame old rivals Cork in the final. In 2010, he captained Kerry to the McGrath Cup, overcoming UCC in the final.

Preceded by Keith Higgins (Mayo)	All Stars Young Footballer of the Year; 2007	Succeeded by Tommy Walsh (Kerry)
Preceded by Andrew O'Sullivan (Cork)	All-Ireland Under-21 FC winning captain 2008	Succeeded by Colm O'Neill (Cork)
Preceded by Fintan Goold (Cork)	U21 Footballer of the Year; 2008	Succeeded by Colm O'Neill (Cork)
