= GS&WR Class 1 =

Irish class of locomotives

GS&WR 1 Class
Type and origin
- Power type: Steam
- Builder: Sharp, Stewart and Company
- Build date: 1845 (Approx)
- Total produced: 20
Specifications
- Configuration
  - Whyte: 2-2-2
- Gauge: 5 ft 3 in (1,600 mm)
- Driver dia.: 5 ft 6 in (1,680 mm)
- Cylinder size: 15 in × 20 in (381 mm × 508 mm)
Career
- Operators: GS&WR
- Number in class: 20
- Numbers: 1—20
- Locale: Ireland

The Great Southern and Western Railway (GS&WR) Class 1 (Or perhaps more simply engine numbers 1 to 20) consisted of half of the initial order of 40 passenger locomotives ordered for the GS&WR and which entered service between approximately 1845 and 1847. The double-frame design was typical of the locomotives Sharp, Stewart and Company of Manchester, England were producing for other railways.
