= Colm O'Neill (Ballyclough Gaelic footballer) =

Irish Gaelic footballer

Personal information
- Native name: Colm Ó Néill (Irish)
- Born: 22 September 1988 (age 38) Ballyclough, County Cork
- Occupation: Bank Official
- Height: 6 ft 0 in (183 cm)

Sport
- Sport: Gaelic Football
- Position: Right corner forward
Club
- Years: Club
- 2005–: Ballyclough
College
- Years: College
- Cork Institute of Technology
College titles
- Sigerson titles: 1
Inter-county
Years	County	Apps (scores)
2009–2018	Cork	36 (7-81)
Inter-county titles
- Munster titles: 2
- All-Irelands: 1
- NFL: 2
- All Stars: 1

Colm O'Neill (born 22 September 1988) is an Irish Gaelic footballer who plays as a right corner-forward for the Cork senior team.

O'Neill made his first appearance for the team during the 2009 championship and quickly became a regular member of the starting fifteen. Since then he has won one All-Ireland medals, two Munster medals, two National League medals and one All-Star award. O'Neill has been an All-Ireland runner-up on one occasion.

At club level O'Neill has won divisional football medals with Ballyclough.

== Playing career ==
=== Club ===
O'Neill plays his club football with his local club called Ballyclough.

=== Minor and under-21 ===
Football

O'Neill first came to prominence on the inter-county scene as a member of the Cork minor football team in 2005. He made his debut as a substitute in the first round of the provincial championship against Limerick. Cork won that game and later qualified for a Munster final showdown with Kerry. By that stage of the championship O'Neill had established himself as a key member of the starting fifteen. In an exciting game he ended up as Cork's top scorer with 2–3 and was a large factor in the 3–8 to 1–11 victory. It was also his first Munster minor winners' medal. Cork, however, were defeated by Offaly in the subsequent All-Ireland quarter-final. Cork's defence of their provincial minor title ended with a semi-final defeat by Tipperary. That same year O'Neill was drafted onto the Cork under-21 football team. He came on as a substitute in the Munster semi-final victory over Clare, however, he played no part in the subsequent Munster final triumph and All-Ireland semi-final defeat.

In 2006 O'Neill was still eligible for the Cork minor team. In spite of scoring a goal and a point, Cork's defence of their provincial minor title ended with a semi-final defeat by Tipperary. Once again, O'Neill was drafted onto the Cork under-21 football team. He came on as a substitute in the Munster semi-final trouncing of Tipperary, however, his services were not required for the subsequent Munster final triumph and All-Ireland final defeat.

By 2007 O'Neill was regularly a part of the starting fifteen of the Cork under-21 team. He lined out in the provincial decider that year against Tipperary and a high-scoring and exciting game developed. O'Neill had an uncharacteristic quiet day and was held scoreless. In spite of that Cork still won by 3–19 to 3–12 and he added a Munster under-21 winners' medal to his collection. Cork later manoeuvred through the All-Ireland series and reached the All-Ireland final against Laois. Another close and exciting game of football developed as neither side took a decisive lead. O'Neill chipped in with a goal and a point, to help his side to a narrow 2–10 to 0–15 victory. It was his first All-Ireland winners' medal at under-21 level.

After surrendering their provincial under-21 crown in 2008, Cork bounced back in 2009 with O'Neill as captain. The Munster final that year pitted Cork against Tipperary and, once again, a close game was the result. At the full-time whistle 'the Rebels' did just about enough to secure a 1–9 to 2–5 victory. It was O'Neill's second Munster under-21 winners' medal on the field of play. For the second time in three years Cork subsequently reached the All-Ireland final. Down provided the opposition on that occasion and there was little to separate the two sides for much of the game. It took a late goal from Colm O'Driscoll to secure a 1–13 to 2–9 victory for Cork. Not only did O'Neill collect a second All-Ireland under-21 winners' medal, but he also had the honour of collecting the cup on behalf of his county.

Hurling

O'Neill also played hurling at minor and Under-21 level with Cork.

In 2006 he was part of the Cork side that won the Munster Minor Hurling Championship after a win over Tipperary in the final.

In 2007 he won a Munster Under-21 Hurling Championship after a win over Waterford in the final.

=== Senior ===
In 2009 O'Neill joined the Cork senior football panel in time for the start of the championship. He made his senior debut as a substitute for James Masters against Waterford in the provincial quarter-final. O'Neill also came on as a substitute in Cork's next game against Kerry and immediately scored a 45-metre free to give Cork a one-point lead. Kerry, however, equalised and forced a draw. The replay saw Cork defeat their old enemy; however, O'Neill played no part in the game. He was introduced as a substitute again in the subsequent Munster final against Limerick, closely followed by his club-mate Paul O'Flynn. The game looked to be going away from Cork, however, 'the Rebels' fought back with O'Neill chipping in with a point. It was a vital score as Cork went on to win by a point on a score line of 2–6 to 0–11. It was O'Neill's first Munster winners' medal in the senior grade. Subsequent defeats of Donegal and Tyrone saw Cork qualify for an All-Ireland final showdown with Kerry. Cork were surprisingly named as favourites, however, this tag appeared to be justified when Cork led by 1–3 to 0–1 early in the opening half, courtesy of a goal and a point from O'Neill. The Kerry team stuck to their gameplan, helped in no small part by a Cork side that recorded fourteen wides. At the final whistle Kerry were the champions again by 0–16 to 1–9.

In 2010 O'Neill was used as an impact sub rather than as a member of the starting fifteen. A defeat by Kerry in a replay of the provincial semi-final resulted in Cork being exiled to the All-Ireland qualifiers. After negotiating their way through a difficult series of games, Cork defeated Dublin to qualify for their third All-Ireland final in four years. Down provided the opposition on that occasion in the first meeting between these two teams since 1994. Cork got off to a lightning start, however, they eased off and trailed by three points at the interval. O'Neill didn't start, however, when he came on as a substitute he immediately caused problems in the full-forward line. Paul Kerrigan got his sole point of the match to put 'the Rebels' ahead for the first time in fifty minutes after surrendering the lead in the fifth minute. Cork stretched the lead to three points, however, Down fought back. At the full-time whistle Cork were the champions by 0–16 to 0–15 and O'Neill picked up an All-Ireland winners' medal.

In 2011, O'Neill injured his cruciate ligament while playing for Cork against Galway. It was his second such injury, having also done it while playing for his club Ballyclough in 2008.

O'Neill did in his cruciate ligament for a third time while playing for Cork in the 2013 National Football League.

== Career statistics ==
Team	Year	National League			Munster		All-Ireland		Total	
Team	Year	Division	Apps	Score	Apps	Score	Apps	Score	Apps	Score
Cork	2009	Division 2	0	0-00	4	0-05	3	1-06	7	1-11
Cork	2010	Division 1	6	0-10	2	0-01	6	0-07	14	0-18
Cork	2011	Division 1	3	1-03	0	0-00	0	0-00	3	1-03
Cork	2012	Division 1	5	4-15	2	0-10	2	2-06	9	6-31
Cork	2013	Division 1	5	0-12	0	0-00	0	0-00	5	0-12
Cork	2014	Division 1	6	3-09	2	0-02	2	0-15	10	3-26
Cork	2015	Division 1	9	5-40	3	1-14	1	1-04	13	7-58
Cork	2016	Division 1	6	3-19	1	0-02	3	1-04	10	4-25
Cork	2017	Division 2	7	0-33	2	0-02	1	0-03	10	0-38
Cork	2018	Division 2	7	2-26	2	1-00	0	0-00	9	3-26
Total			54	18-167	18	2-36	18	5-45	90	25-248

== Honours ==
=== Cork ===
- All-Ireland Senior Football Championship:
  - Winner (1): 2010
  - Runner-up (1): 2009
- Munster Senior Football Championship:
  - Winner (1): 2009
- All-Ireland Under-21 Football Championship:
  - Winner (2): 2007, 2009 (c)
  - Runner-up (1): 2006 (sub)
- Munster Under-21 Football Championship:
  - Winner (2): 2005 (sub), 2006 (sub), 2007, 2009 (c)
- Munster Minor Football Championship:
  - Winner (1): 2005
- Munster Minor Hurling Championship:
  - Winner (1): 2006
- Munster Under-21 Hurling Championship:
  - Winner (2):2007

Achievements
Preceded by Killian Young (Kerry)	All-Ireland Under-21 Football Final winning captain 2009	Succeeded by Jonny Cooper (Dublin)
Awards
Preceded by Killian Young (Kerry)	U21 Footballer of the Year; 2009	Succeeded by Rory O'Carroll (Dublin)
