= Reginald Green (cricketer) =

Irish cricketer

Personal information
- Full name: Reginald Kilocksley Green
- Born: 1873; Killorglin, Ireland
- Died: 6 March 1940 (aged 66/67); Isleworth, Middlesex, England

Domestic team information
- Years: Team
- 1915/16–1920/21: Europeans (India)

Career statistics
Competition	First-class
Matches	5
Runs scored	246
Batting average	24.60
100s/50s	0/1
Top score	78
Balls bowled	378
Wickets	6
Bowling average	31.33
5 wickets in innings	0
10 wickets in match	0
Best bowling	2/21
Catches/stumpings	4/–
- Source: Cricinfo, 30 November 2018

Reginald Kilocksley Green (1873 – 6 March 1940) was an Irish first-class cricketer.

Green was born at Killorglin in County Kerry sometime in 1873. He later played first-class cricket in British India for the Europeans, debuting in the 1915/16 Madras Presidency against the Indians. He played in the next four editions of the tournament, making four further first-class appearances. He scored a total of 246 runs in his five matches, averaging 24.60, with a highest score of 78. With the ball, he took 6 wickets at a bowling average of 31.33, with best figures of 2/21. He later returned from India and settled in England, where he died at Isleworth in March 1940.
