= Valentia Harbour railway station =

Former pier railway terminus in Ireland

Valentia Harbour
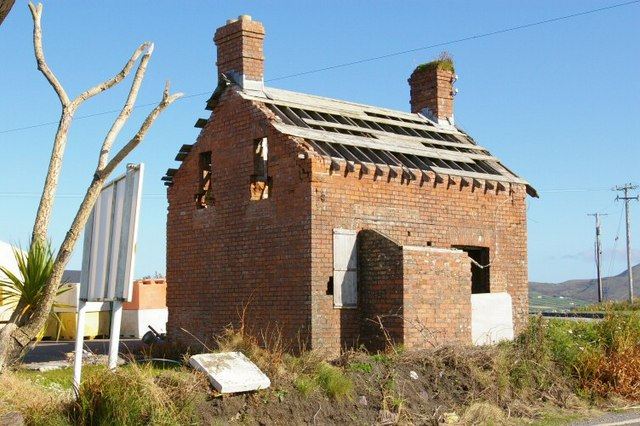
- Remains of the goods shed at Valentia Harbour station. Photograph taken on 22 September 2008.

General information
- Location: Reenard West, County Kerry; Ireland
- Coordinates: 51.929897°N 10.277085°W
- Elevation: 12 ft (3.7 m)
- Line: Farranfore–Valentia Harbour

History
- Original company: Great Southern and Western Railway
- Pre-grouping: Great Southern and Western Railway
- Post-grouping: Great Southern and Western Railway

Key dates
- 12 September 1893: Station opens
- 1 February 1960: Station closes
Location

Valentia Harbour railway station was the terminus of the Farranfore–Valentia Harbour line originally operated by the Great Southern and Western Railway in Ireland. It was the most westerly railway station in Europe.

== History ==
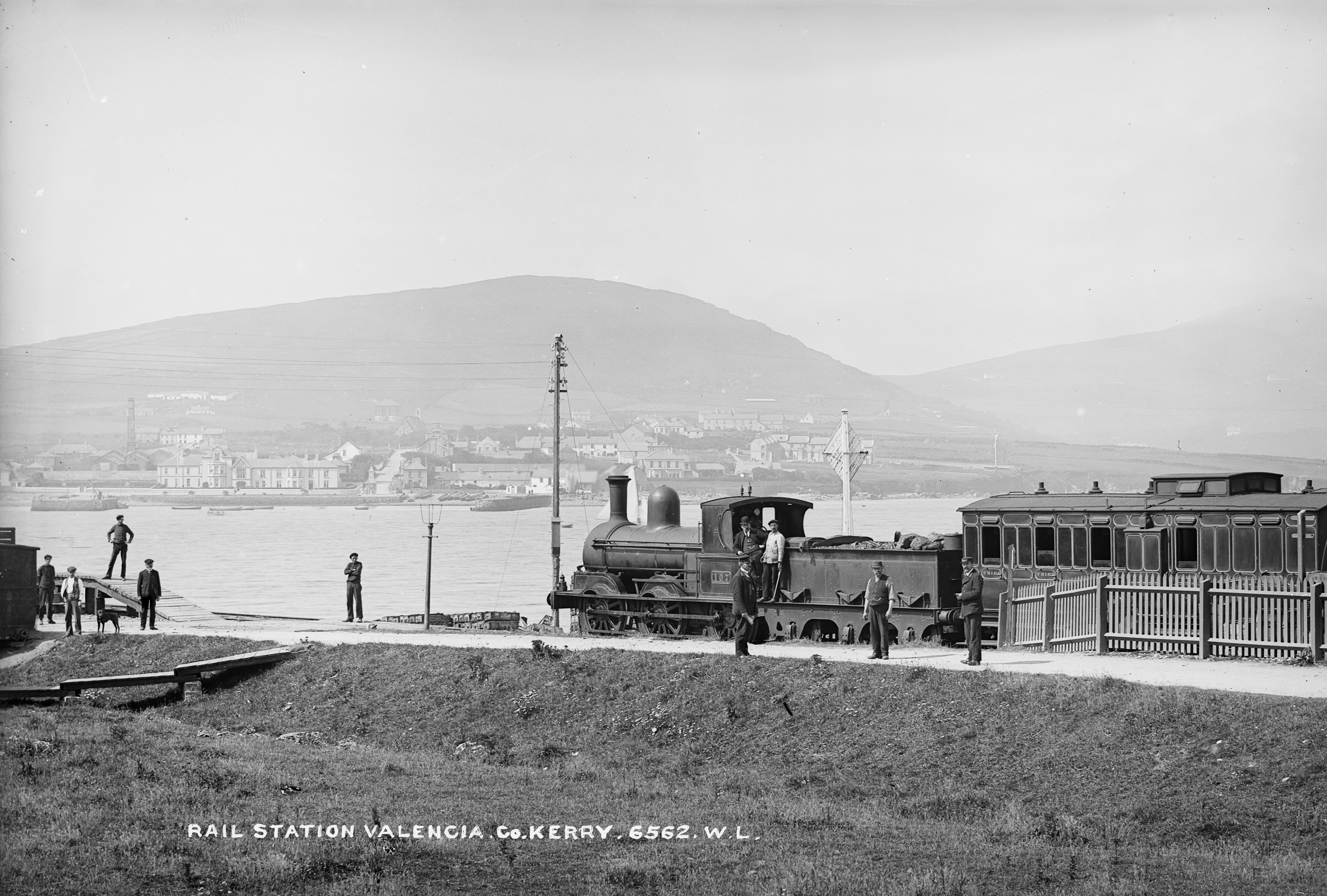
Next stop, America!

A station at Valentia Harbour was suggested from as early as 1846, as there were suggestions that the harbour should be used as a packet station for services to the United States of America. It took much longer to come to fruition and the station was finally opened on 12 September 1893. The station closed on 1 February 1960, the last service train having run on 30 January 1960.

== Route ==
Preceding station	Historical railways	Following station
Cahirciveen	Great Southern and Western Railway; Farranfore–Valentia Harbour	Terminus
