= River Laune =

River in County Kerry, Ireland

Coordinates: 52°08′N 9°47′W

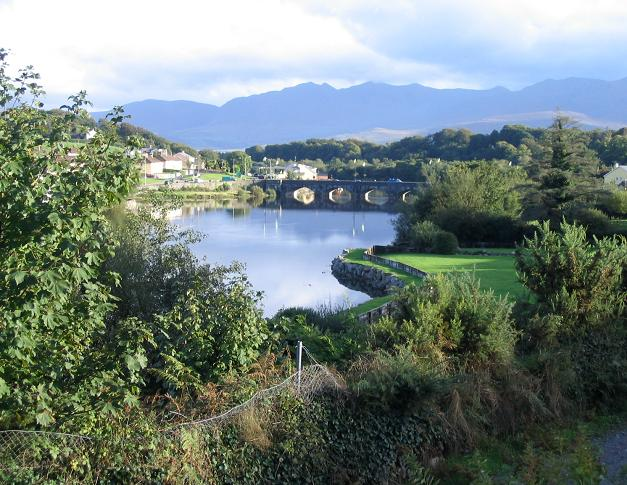
- River Laune at Killorglin
- Etymology: From Old Irish leaṁan, "elm"
- Native name: An Leamhain (Irish)

Location
- Country: Ireland

Physical characteristics
- Mouth
  - location: Atlantic Ocean via Castlemaine Harbour
- Length: 23 km (14 mi)
- Basin size: 829 km^{2} (320 sq mi)
- Discharge
  - average: 43 m^{3}/s (1,500 cu ft/s)

The River Laune (/laʊn/; Irish: An Leamhain) is a river in County Kerry, Ireland, which flows from Lough Leane (sometimes written as Lough Lein), one of the Lakes of Killarney, through Beaufort, past Ballymalis Castle, through the town of Killorglin, and empties into the sea, first at Castlemaine harbour beside the river Maine and then out through Dingle Bay. The Laune is well known for salmon and trout fishing.

The river Laune is 14 miles (23 km) long and combined with the River Flesk 28.25 miles (45.46 km), which feeds Lough Leane, has a total length of 42.25 miles (67.99 km). It has a mean flow rate of 43 m³/s.

The River Laune flows approximately 20 km to drain Killarney’s Lough Leane into the sea at Castlemaine Harbour. The Laune carries most of the rainfall from the MacGillycuddy Reeks, Ireland’s highest mountain range. Many streams on the south side of the Reeks drain into Killarney’s Upper Lake before filtering down to Lough Leane. As the River Laune drains Lough Leane to the sea, it is fed by two rivers running north from the Reeks, the River Loe from the Gap of Dunloe and the Gaddagh River from the heart of the Reeks. Another tributary, the Cottoners River, carries rainwater from the west of the Reeks. On the southern side of the bridge, a low embankment runs upstream for about 1 km towards Killarney. This is part of over 40 km of embankments that prevent the sea from flooding low-lying land around Castlemaine Harbour. These embankments exist due to Napoleon’s dominance in Europe around the year 1808. The British government were looking for alternative sources of hemp to make sailcloth for their navy to defend against a possible invasion.

If the bogs of Ireland could be drained then they could be used to grow this raw material without affecting the existing agricultural output of the country. In 1811–1812 Alexander Nimmo surveyed and mapped over 76,000 acres (30,700 ha) of land on the Iveragh Peninsula for the Bogs Commission. Over 17,000 acres (7,000 ha) of this were on the sea shore area of the Laune River, Lower Maine River, and Castlemaine Harbour. These stone and earthen banks still prevent high tides flooding much of this land. The banks vary from 1 m to over 5 m in height. Sluice gates allow water drain out at low tide and prevent rising tides from flooding the land. The banks run from the townland of Tullig near Cromane, to Killorglin, part way up the Laune, around the area of Callinafercy, up both sides of the Maine River and along the north side of Castlemaine Harbour, part way to Inch. Various major repairs are evident where large rocks and concrete have replaced the stone and earth, although much of the original banks are still intact.

The Killorglin river bank walk and the Astellas river bank walk downstream of the Metal Bridge are both part of these 200-year-old embankment

== Killorglin County Bridge ==
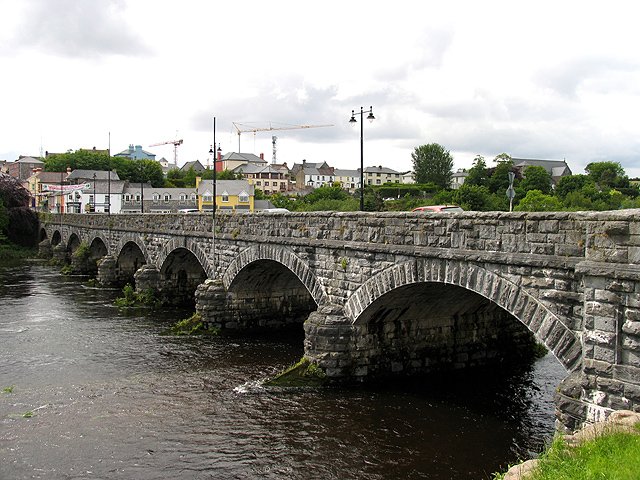
Killorglin County Bridge over the River Laune

Killorglin’s County Bridge was built in 1885 (same year as the Laune Viaduct / "Metal Bridge"). It replaced an older wooden bridge that apparently got covered during high Spring tides. The current bridge is built from local limestone, moved by horse and cart from Steelroe Quarries approximately 1 km away on the Tralee Road. Stonecutters shaped each stone by hand to make up the piers, the eight stone arches and the side walls of the bridge. Each arch is 15.24 m long making a total length of 123 m.

The bridge is now a protected structure and is listed on the national inventory of architectural heritage (NIAH) where it is given a rating of 'Regional Importance' under four categories 'Architectural, Artistic, Historical and Technical'.

== Art on the Laune ==
In 2001 the Killorglin Millennium Committee built "Faiche Ri Na Phoic" (The lawn of King of Puck) and erected the Puck Statue at the eastern end of the bridge. The goat symbolises the tradition of Puck Fair held in the town on 10, 11, and 12 August every year since the early 17th century.

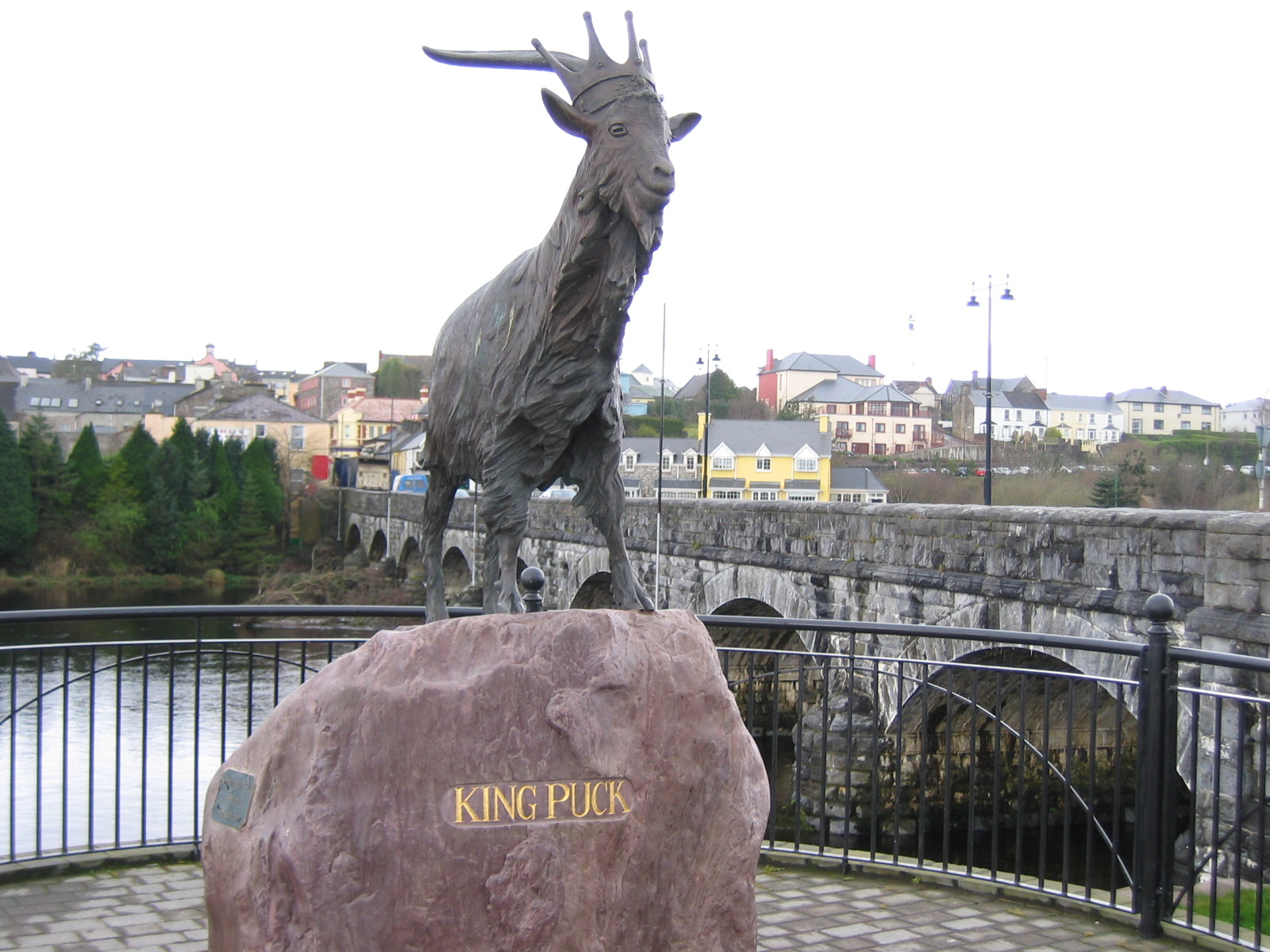

The Puck Poets Corner was added in 2010. This displays verses about Killorglin from various contributors dating back as far as the year 1876. Featuring poets such as Edso Crowley, Sigerson Clifford, Johnny Patterson and Peter Joy.

== See also ==
- Rivers of Ireland
- List of loughs in Ireland
