= Francis Brewster (lord mayor) =

Lord Mayor of Dublin, Ireland

Sir Francis Brewster (fl. 1674–1702) was a writer on trade, and a citizen and alderman of Dublin, Ireland. He was Lord Mayor of Dublin in 1674.

== Case against public abuses ==
In February 1692–1693 Brewster gave evidence before the Irish House of Commons on certain public abuses in Ireland, and in 1698 was appointed one of seven commissioners to inquire into the forfeited estates in Ireland. The commissioners disagreed among themselves, and when the report was delivered in the following year it was signed by only four of the members of the commission; the other three, the Earl of Drogheda, Sir Richard Levinge, and Sir F. Brewster, having refused to sign it because they thought it false and ill-grounded in several particulars. The dispute was brought before parliament, and Sir R. Levinge was committed to the Tower for spreading scandalous aspersions against some of his colleagues.

== Works ==
Brewster was the author of Essays in Trade and Navigation. In Five Parts, London 1695. The first part only was published; but in 1702 he issued New Essays on Trade, wherein the present state of our Trade, its great decay in the chief branches of it, and the fatal consequences thereof to the Nation (unless timely remedy'd), is considered under the most important heads of Trade and Navigation, London. An anonymous book has also been ascribed to him: A Discourse concerning Ireland and the different Interests thereof; in answer to the Exon and Barnstaple Petitions; shewing that if a Law were enacted to prevent the exportation of Woollen Manufactures from Ireland to Foreign Parts, what the consequences thereof would be both to England and Ireland, London 1698.

Civic offices
Preceded by Sir Joshua Allen	Lord Mayor of Dublin; 1674–1675	Succeeded by William Smith
