= Renard GAA =

Gaelic games club in County Kerry, Ireland

Reenard
- Na Rinn Airde
- Founded: 1899
- County: Kerry
- Nickname: Reenard
- Colours: Blue and White
- Grounds: Pairc Ui Dhonnchu
- Coordinates: 51°55′52.33″N 10°15′12.80″W

Playing kits
Standard colours

Reenard (or Renard as it is also spelled) is a Gaelic Athletic Association club from the County Kerry, Ireland townland of Reenard. The club competes in Gaelic football competitions organized by the Kerry county board and the South Kerry divisional board. Together with nine other clubs they supply players to the South Kerry Divisional team.

== History ==
The first mention of Reenard was when Pat McGillicuddy of Reenard won the first Dublin Senior Football Championship in 1887 with Erins Hope which was then the name of football team of St. Patrick's College of Education in Drumcondra. McGillicuddy returned to County Kerry to take up principalship of the National School in the nearby townland of Knockeens in 1890 and immediately set about organising Gaelic football in the locality.

Reenard contested the 1902, 1903, 1904 and 1905 South Kerry Championship and were affiliated to the South Kerry Board in 1904. In 1925 the South Kerry League commenced seeing Reenard compete along with other South Kerry teams. In 1942 playing as "Con Keatings" they won their first title, the Iveragh Junior Championship, by defeating Waterville on a score 1–4 to 1–1.

In 1944 the club was renamed Reenard after the townland. Reenard's first success at senior level came in their first South Kerry Senior Football Championship final in 1948 when they defeated Derrynane by 1–9 to 2–5. Due to emigration and economic deprivation the club was forced to amalgamate with the Foilmore club in the 1960s and 70's. Ned O'Neill, from Reenard Point, was the first South Kerryman to win an All-Ireland medal when Kerry beat Kildare in the 1903 All-Ireland Senior Football Championship (the final was played in 1905 due to circumstances).

On Sunday 29 July 1984 Reenard's official ground, Pairc Ui Dhonnchu, was opened. It was named after Tomas O'Donnchu, the first President of Reenard GAA. The president at that time, Brian Mac Mathuna, opened the ground and to mark the occasion Reenard played a game versus Kingdom Kerry Gaels.

== Honours ==
=== Senior ===
- Iveragh Junior Championship (As Con Keatings) - 1942
- South Kerry Senior Football Championship (5) 1948, 1951, 1953, 1974, 1989
- South Kerry Special League - 1966, 1980
- South Kerry Senior League - 1968, 1975, 1980
- Kerry Junior Football Championship (1) 2023
- Kerry Novice A Football Championship (3) 1984, 1989, 2001
- Kerry County Senior Football League Division 5 - 2004, 2015
- Kerryman Centenary Sevens Shield - 2004
- County Senior Football League Division 4 - 2005
- Cahill Cup - 2005
- South Kerry Junior Football Championship (1) 2006
- County Junior Football League Division 6 Champions - 2013

=== Minor ===
- South Kerry Minor Football Championship - 1967, 1979, 1982, 1996, 1997, 2012
- South Kerry Minor Football League Division 2 - 1987, 1988
- County Minor Football League Division 5 - 1988
- County Minor Football League Division 6 - 1998, 2002
- South Kerry Minor B Football Championship - 2000, 2003, 2007
- Kerry Minor Football League Division 5A -2004, 2005
- South Kerry Minor Football League Division 1 - 2010, 2012

=== South Kerry Senior Football Championship ===
They have won the South Kerry Senior Football Championship 5 times (once together with Foilmore).

Rank	Team	Wins	Winning years
5	Renard	4	1948, 1951, 1953, 1989
9	Renard/Foilmore	1	1974

Year	Winner	Opponent
1989	Renard	Valentia
1988	Valentia	Renard
1974	Renard/Foilmore 2.04	Valentia 1.03
1967	Waterville 3.09	Renard/Foilmore 1.08 Match abandoned in extra time, Waterville awarded championship
1957	Valentia 0.03	Renard 0.01
1954	St Mary's 0.5	Renard 1.00 (After 1.07 - 2.04 Draw)
1953	Renard 2.07	Waterville 1.04 (After Draw 0.14 -3.05)
1951	Renard 0.04	Valentia 0.03
1950	Valentia 1.04	Renard 0.02
1948	Renard 1.09	Derrynane 2.05

=== Honours as part of South Kerry ===
- Senior County Championship: 8 - 1955, 1956, 1958, 1981, 1982, 2004, 2005, 2006
- Kerry Under 21 Football Championship: 9 - 1984, 1987, 1988, 1991, 1992, 2003, 2004, 2005, 2007
- Kerry Minor Football Championship: 9 - 1963, 1970, 1971, 1975, 1992, 1999, 2000, 2001, 2005

== Notable players ==
- Eamonn O'Neill Kerry intercounty player
- Dan Kelly Kerry intercounty player
- Francie O'Shea Kerry intercounty player
- John T. O'Sullivan Kerry intercounty player Minor All Ireland Medal Winner 1980
- Jim Sugrue Kerry intercounty player
- Pat Tommy O'Sullivan Kerry intercounty player
- Pat McCrohan Kerry intercounty player U21 All Ireland medal winner 1976
- Mike O'Neill Kerry intercounty player
- Frank O'Donoghue Kerry intercounty player
- John Sugrue County Trainer Laois Senior Football Manager 2018
- Killian Young Kerry intercounty player Senior All Ireland Medal Winner 2006 & 2007 & 2014
- Eoin O Neill Kerry intercounty player & London intercounty player U21 All Ireland medal winner 2008
- The O'Mahony brothers, James, John & Jerry, distinguished themselves with Reenard, Kerry and later with London
- Mossie Kelly, John Daly, Robbie and J.J. Wharton all played with the Kingdom Kerry Gaels in London.
- Brian Sugrue Kerry intercounty player Munster Minor Champions 2013, 2014. All Ireland Minor 2014 All Ireland Junior Medal Winner 2015
- Robert Wharton Kerry intercounty player Munster Minor Champions 2013, 2014 All Ireland Minor 2014 All Ireland Junior Medal Winner 2016
- Michael O Leary Kerry intercounty player Munster Minor Champions 2017, All Ireland Minor 2017
