= Reenard =

Reenard An Rinn Aird
- Townland
- Location in Ireland
- Coordinates: 51°55′59″N 10°16′01″W
- Country: Ireland
- Province: Munster
- County: Kerry
- Time zone: UTC+0 (WET)
  - Summer (DST): UTC-1 (IST (WEST))

Reenard (Irish: an Rinn Aird) is a townland in County Kerry, Ireland. It is located in north central Iveragh Peninsula on the southwest coast of Ireland opposite Valentia Island about 5 miles west of Cahersiveen. Reenard is connected to the Irish road network by a road crossing the N70 national secondary route at Point's Cross.

Reenard Point, located in the townland, is the mainland terminal for the car ferry to Knightstown on Valentia Island.

== Railways ==
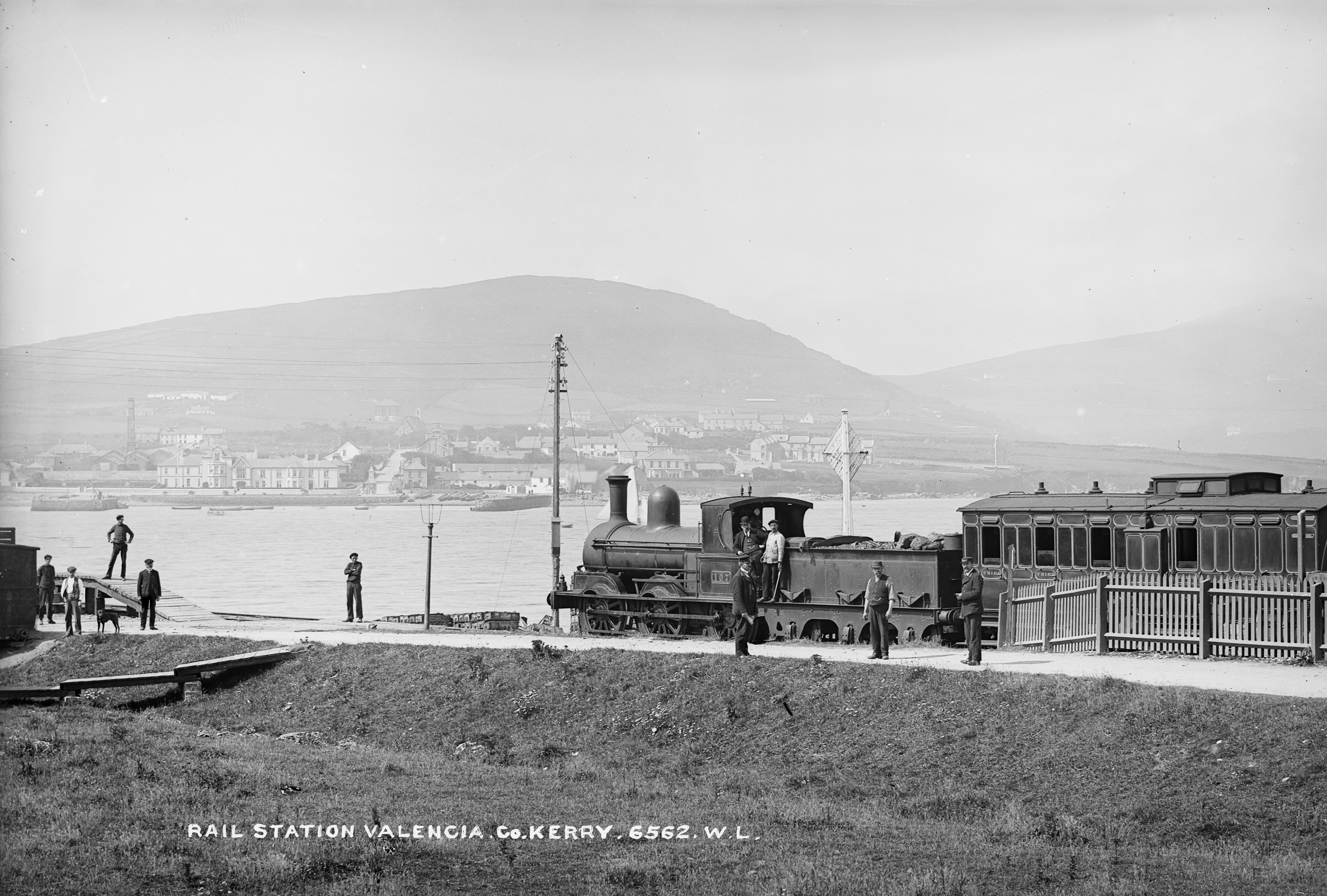
Next stop, America! Valentia Harbour railway station, formerly the most westerly station in the British Isles.

Valentia Harbour railway station was finally opened on 12 September 1893.

The station closed on 1 February 1960.

== GAA ==
Reenard is known in Ireland for its GAA club which has historically supplied players to the Kerry senior football team.

== Notable people ==
- Jerry O Mahoney, Gaelic footballer

== See also ==
- Valentia Harbour railway station
