= Killorglin =

Town in County Kerry, Ireland

Killorglin Cill Orglan (Irish)
- Town
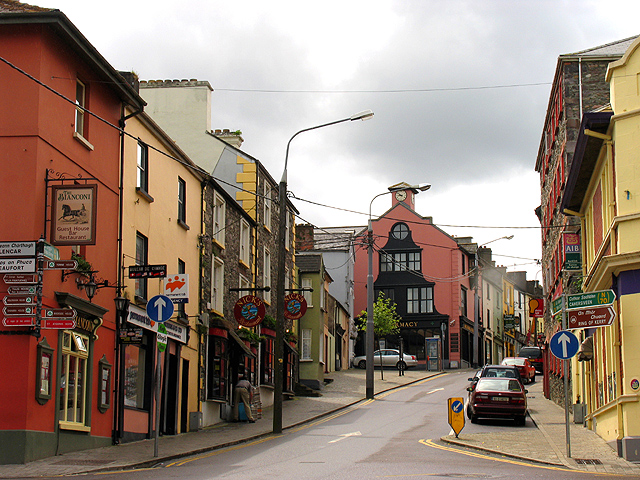
- Killorglin Town

- Location in Ireland
- Coordinates: 52°06′23″N 9°47′06″W
- Country: Ireland
- Province: Munster
- County: County Kerry

Population (2022)
  - Total: 2,163
- Time zone: UTC+0 (WET)
  - Summer (DST): UTC-1 (IST (WEST))
- Irish Grid Reference: V774965

Killorglin (Irish: Cill Orglan, meaning 'Orgla's Church') is a town in County Kerry, Ireland. As of the 2022 census, the town's population was 2,163. Killorglin is on the Ring of Kerry tourist route, and annual events include the August Puck Fair festival, which starts with the crowning and parading of a "king" wild goat. The town is 26 km south of Tralee along the N70 road, and 22 km west of Killarney along the N72 road. Killorglin is in a civil parish of the same name.

== History ==
=== Origins and development ===
The earliest evidence of ancient settlement in the Killorglin area is the presence of prehistoric rock art. These rock carvings are part of a Late Neolithic/Early Bronze Age tradition stretching across Atlantic Europe and occur in concentrations around the Iveragh and Dingle peninsulas, with a cluster close to the nearby town of Glenbeigh. There are also a number of ringforts and early Christian ecclesiastical sites in the townlands of Dromavally and Castleconway. The ruins of Killorglin Castle, later known as Castle Conway, are located close to what is now the centre of the town. It was built in the early 13th century by Maurice FitzGerald, 2nd Lord of Offaly.

The area was held by the FitzGerald dynasty until the confiscation of their lands following the Desmond Rebellions in the late 16th century. In 1587, as part of the Munster Plantation, Killorglin (and its castle) was granted to Captain Jenkin Conway.

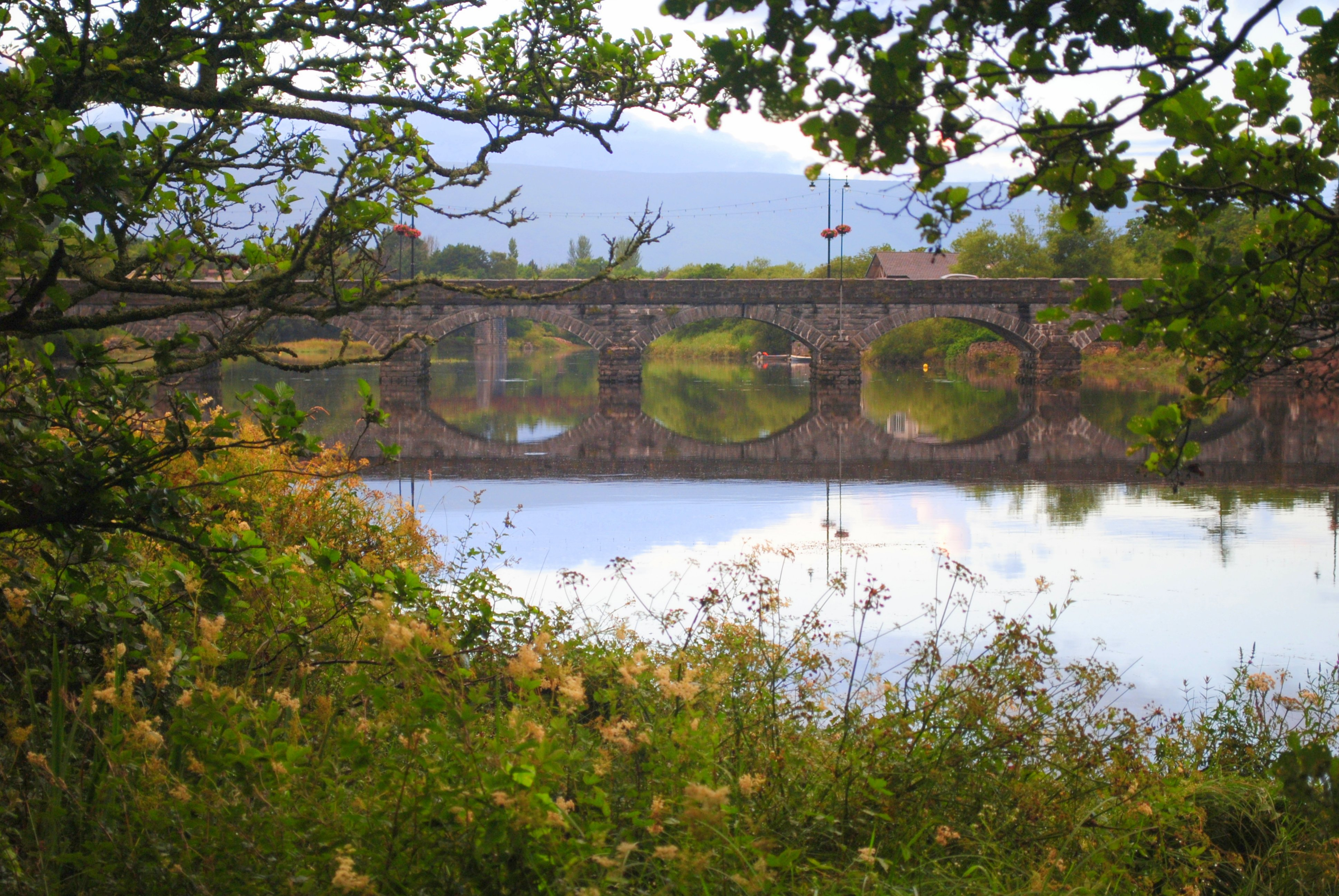
Killorglin Bridge was built in 1885

Much of the town centre was laid out in the 19th century. Killorglin's Roman Catholic church was built (on the site of an earlier church) in 1891. The Church of Ireland church was originally built in 1816 and significantly redeveloped in 1868. The town hall was built in the early 20th century with the help of Andrew Carnegie.

=== Ballykissane 1916 ===
On Ballykissane Pier is a monument to commemorate the deaths of several Irish Volunteers, the first casualties of the Easter Rising in 1916. They were in a car that plunged off the pier into the River Laune while on the way to make contact with Roger Casement and a German arms ship masquerading as the Aud.

On Good Friday 21 April 1916, six Irish Volunteers set off from Dublin by train to Killarney. From there, they were to travel by car to Cahirciveen in order to seize control of the wireless station on Valentia Island. Thomas McInerney, who drove a car carrying three of the men, become lost just outside Killorglin and turned onto the road which led to the quay. The front wheels of the car went over the edge of the quay, became unbalanced, and fell into the River Laune. McInerney was the only person to escape the car and swim to shore. The other three occupants remained trapped in the vehicle and drowned.

== Economy and tourism ==
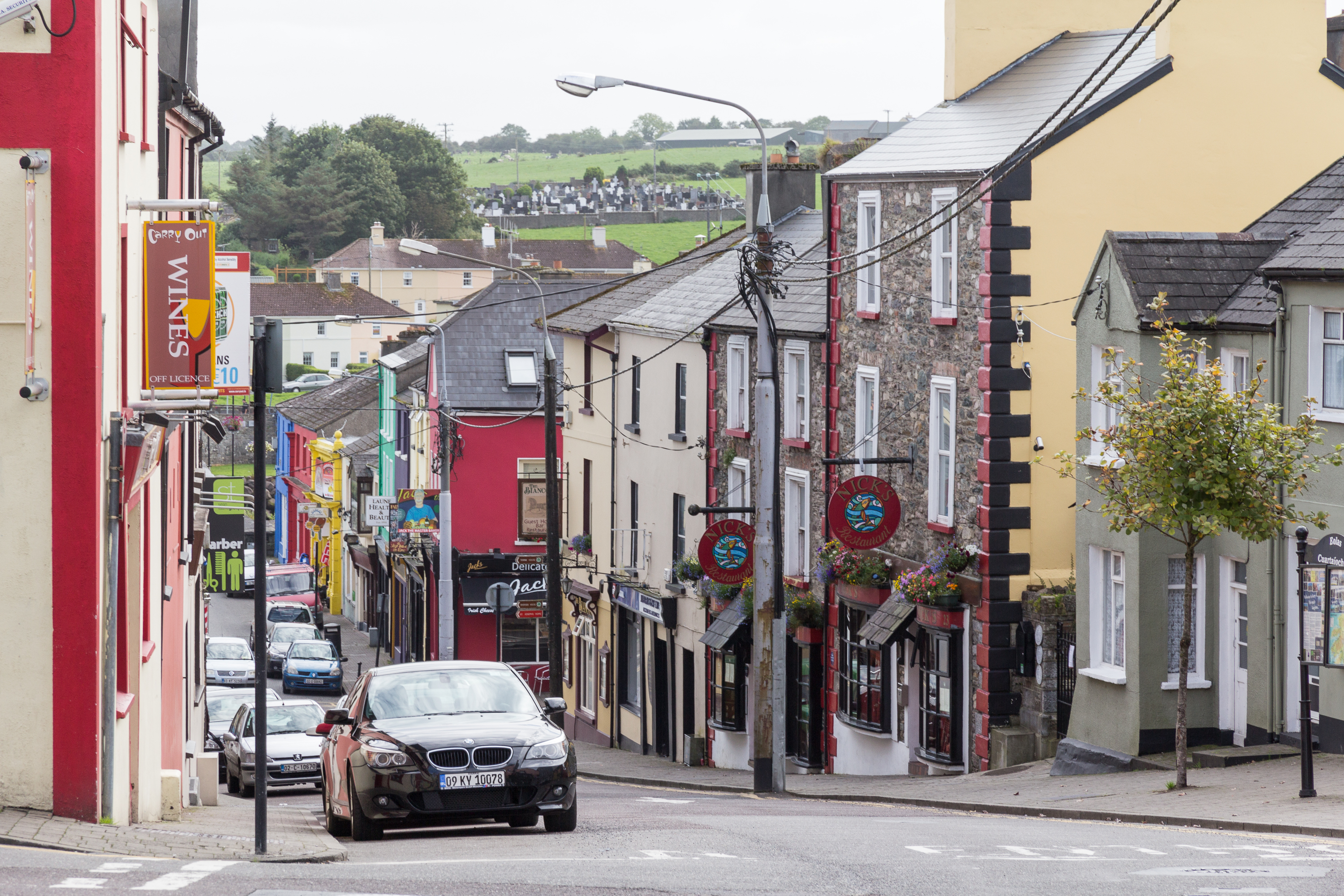
Lower Bridge Street

Fexco, a major financial services company, was founded in Killorglin in 1981 and is still headquartered in the town. Pharmaceutical firms Temmler and Astellas have small plants in Killorglin. It also has the operations centre for the Prize Bond Company.

A 100m wind turbine was erected at the Astellas Plant on the Tralee Road in 2012 and has become a local landmark

Killorglin is on the Wild Atlantic Way and Ring of Kerry tourist routes. A visitor centre for the Reeks District is also located in the town.

== Culture ==
=== Puck Fair ===
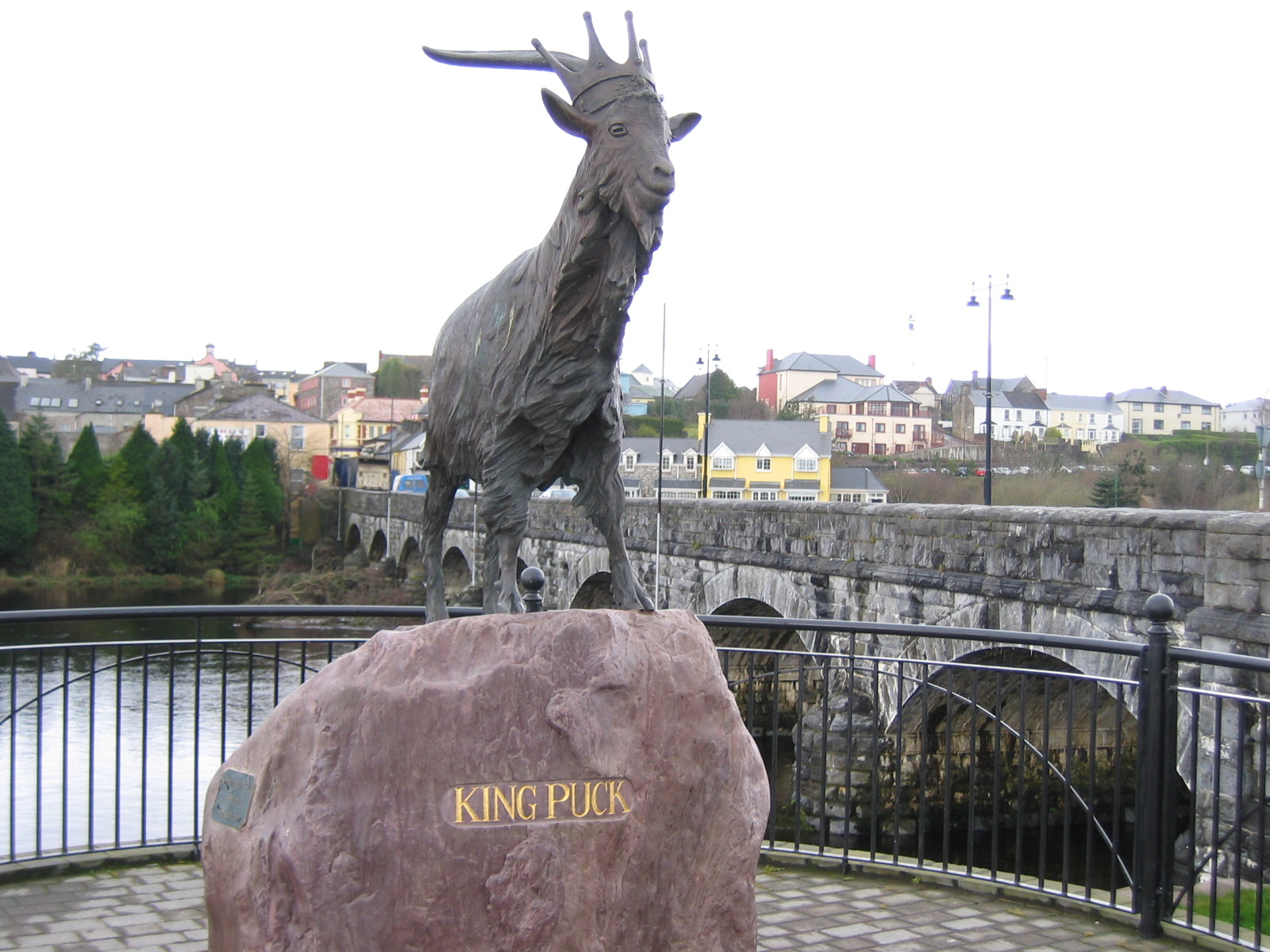
King Puck Statue

Killorglin is known for the annual Puck Fair festival, which traditionally starts with the crowning of a "king" goat. There is a large bronze King Puck statue on the edge of town close to the bridge. This statue was commissioned by the Killorglin Millennium Committee and designed by Valentia Island Sculptor Alan Ryan Hall. The King Puck Statue and Puck Garden was completed in 2001 and officially unveiled by Killorglin Lord Mayor Paudie Cronin and the Killorglin Millennium Committee.

In 2011, The Puck Poet plaques were added to the Puck Garden to recall some of the writers and poets who have written about Killorglin. These include Edso Crowley, Sigerson Clifford, Peter Joy and Johnny Patterson.

=== Film ===
The father of Academy Award-winning actor Ed Begley (1901–1970) was born in Laharn, Killorglin.

The Academy Award for Best Animated Short Film-nominated stop-motion film Head Over Heels (2012) was produced by Cromane filmmaker Fodhla Cronin O'Reilly. Cronin O'Reilly attended secondary school in Killorglin.

As of 2015, Áine Moriarty from Killorglin was head of the Irish Film & Television Academy (IFTA). Killorglin actor Muiris Crowley starred in the film Pilgrim Hill (2013). It was directed by fellow Kerryman Gerard Barrett.

=== Music and events ===
Killorglin and its Puck Fair feature in a number of traditional Irish ballads and songs, including Bridget Donohue written by Johnny Patterson, King Puck by Christy Moore, and Wildflower of the Laune by Peter Joy.

A local tradition, Biddy's Day, occurs in the area during February. It involves groups, in traditional dress, visiting homes carrying a Brídeóg (or Biddy) effigy to ensure good luck. In 2019, this Mid-Kerry practice was one of 30 "Intangible cultural heritage" traditions afforded recognition by the state.

=== Literature ===
Books about Killorglin, or by Killorglin natives, include:

- Things My Mother Never Told Me (2003), by Blake Morrison, tells the story of the author's mother who was from Killorglin and emigrated to England.
- Cast A Laune Shadow (1997), by local historian Patrick (Pa) Houlihan (1918-2010), is a history of the town in story.
- Puck Fair, by Pa's eldest son Michael Houlihan, is about the annual festival in August.
- St James and Fr Tom, by Terence Houlihan and Billy Browne, details the development of St James's Catholic church by Fr Tom Lawlor.
- The Civil War in Kerry, by local historian Tom Doyle, details the part Kerry and Killorglin played in the Irish Civil War.

== Sport ==
Laune Rangers, the local Gaelic Athletic Association club, won the All-Ireland Senior Club Football Championship in 1996.

Killorglin Rugby Club's Under-16 team won the West Munster Trophy in 2006, and Under-18 squad won the West Munster Trophy in 2008. The rugby club was awarded "Munster Youths Club of the Year" in 2008.

Former members of the local association football club, Killorglin AFC, include Shane McLoughlin (who went on to play with Ipswich Town F.C. and AFC Wimbledon). The 2009 and 2016 women's solo World Coastal Rowing Champion, Monika Dukarska, is a member of Killorglin Rowing Club.

The town is approximately 15 kilometres (9.3 mi) from the base of Carrauntoohil, Ireland's highest mountain, and 50 kilometres (31 mi) from Mount Brandon, Ireland's 2nd highest mountain. Both mountains are centres for hillwalking and mountaineering. The National Centre for Outdoor Education and Training (Cappanalea) is also nearby at Caragh Lake.

== People ==
- Tom Barry, Irish revolutionary and author
- Máirín Cregan, revolutionary and writer of children's books, was born in Killorglin in 1891
- Mike-Frank Russell, former Kerry GAA footballer and All-Star
- Liam Hassett, 1997 All-Ireland Senior Football Championship winning captain
- Reginald Green, first-class cricketer
- Timothy O'Connor, Fianna Fáil politician who served as a TD for the Kerry South constituency from 1961 to 1981.
