= Farranfore =

Village in County Kerry, Ireland

Farranfore An Fearann Fuar
- Village
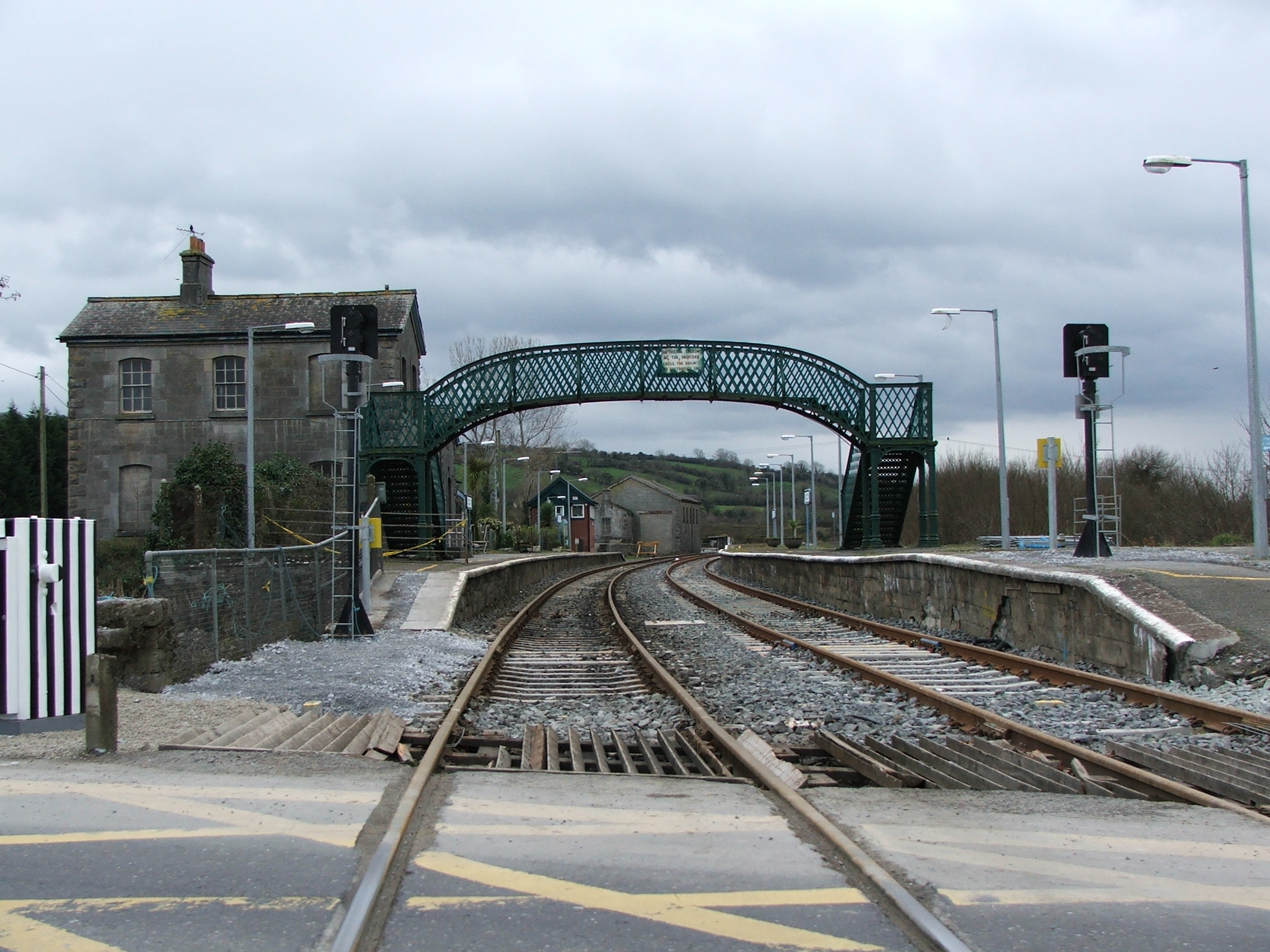
- Farranfore railway station

- Location in Ireland
- Coordinates: 52°10′17″N 9°33′01″W
- Country: Ireland
- Province: Munster
- County: County Kerry
- Time zone: UTC+0 (WET)
  - Summer (DST): UTC-1 (IST (WEST))
- Irish Grid Reference: Q932036

Farranfore (Irish: An Fearann Fuar, meaning 'the cold land') is a village in County Kerry, Ireland. It lies on the N22 road approximately midway between Tralee (10 miles or 17 km) and Killarney (9 miles or 15 km) and on the railway line connecting the two towns.

Farranfore came into existence as a turnpike; a gate at the cross-roads in the village marked the boundary of the lands of the Earls of Kenmare.

== Transport ==
Between 1893 and 1960, Farranfore railway station, which opened on 18 July 1859, was known as Farranfore Junction, as it was the point where one boarded to connect to Valentia Harbour.

Farranfore is notable in particular for its nearby airport, known as Kerry Airport. The single runway at Farranfore has been predominantly used by Ryanair since it opened a base at the airport in July 2008. Ryanair operates regular services from Farranfore to London Stansted, London Luton and Frankfurt-Hahn, as well as seasonally to Spain and Portugal.

== Notable people ==
- Jack Sherwood, footballer
- Donal Daly, footballer

== See also ==
- List of towns and villages in Ireland.
