= Irish greenways =

Irish recreational cycling trails

Ireland's greenways are off-road routes for walkers, cyclists and other non-motorised transport in Ireland, which are often created as rail trails on abandoned sections of the Irish rail network. In the Republic of Ireland, several greenway initiatives have been centrally funded by the Irish government. In Northern Ireland, greenways are typically part of the collective British National Cycle Network (NCN).

== Examples ==
There are a number of greenways (including several rail trails) in Ireland. Notable examples include the:

- Boyne Greenway (1.9 kilometres (1.2 mi))
- Carlingford Lough Greenway (Carlingford to Omeath, 6.2 kilometres (3.9 mi)).
- Grand Canal Cycleway (118 kilometres (73 mi))
- Great Southern Trail, comprising the Limerick Greenway and North Kerry Greenway, was 40 kilometres (25 mi) long as of 2021
- Great Western Greenway (44 kilometres (27 mi))
- Royal Canal Greenway (130 kilometres (81 mi))
- Waterford Greenway (46 kilometres (29 mi), which opened in March 2017

== Under construction ==
=== Ireland ===
A number of greenways have been proposed to be built (or are under construction or partially opened) in the Republic of Ireland. For example, in 2018, a 6 kilometres (3.7 mi) section (from Athry to Cloonbeg) of the proposed 76 kilometres (47 mi) Connemara Greenway was opened. In County Kerry, the Tralee-Fenit Greenway was partially completed as of 2021. Some sections of the Dublin-Galway Greenway, proposed ultimately to be a 276 kilometres (171 mi) 'coast-to-coast' greenway and rail trail, have been partially opened.

Other examples include the Athlone to Mullingar Cycleway, some sections of which opened in 2015. and Cork Greenway. Progress on the proposed South Kerry Greenway was subject to planning challenges and decisions as of late 2021.

=== Northern Ireland ===
In 2016, Derry City and Strabane District Council in partnership with Donegal County Council, Sustrans Northern Ireland and the Department for Infrastructure (Northern Ireland) secured funding to construct 46.5 km of greenway and segregated cycling routes linking Derry in Northern Ireland to Muff and Buncrana in County Donegal. The project team was established in 2017, and the plan was to complete construction works by 2021. The project, funded by INTERREG VA and administered by the Special European Union Programmes Body, was titled the 'North West Greenway Network'. As of late 2021, work on some sections of the North West Greenway Network had reputedly begun, while other sections of the proposed cycleway have reportedly met with planning objections and land use issues.
