= County Kerry =

County in Ireland

County Kerry Contae Chiarraí
- County
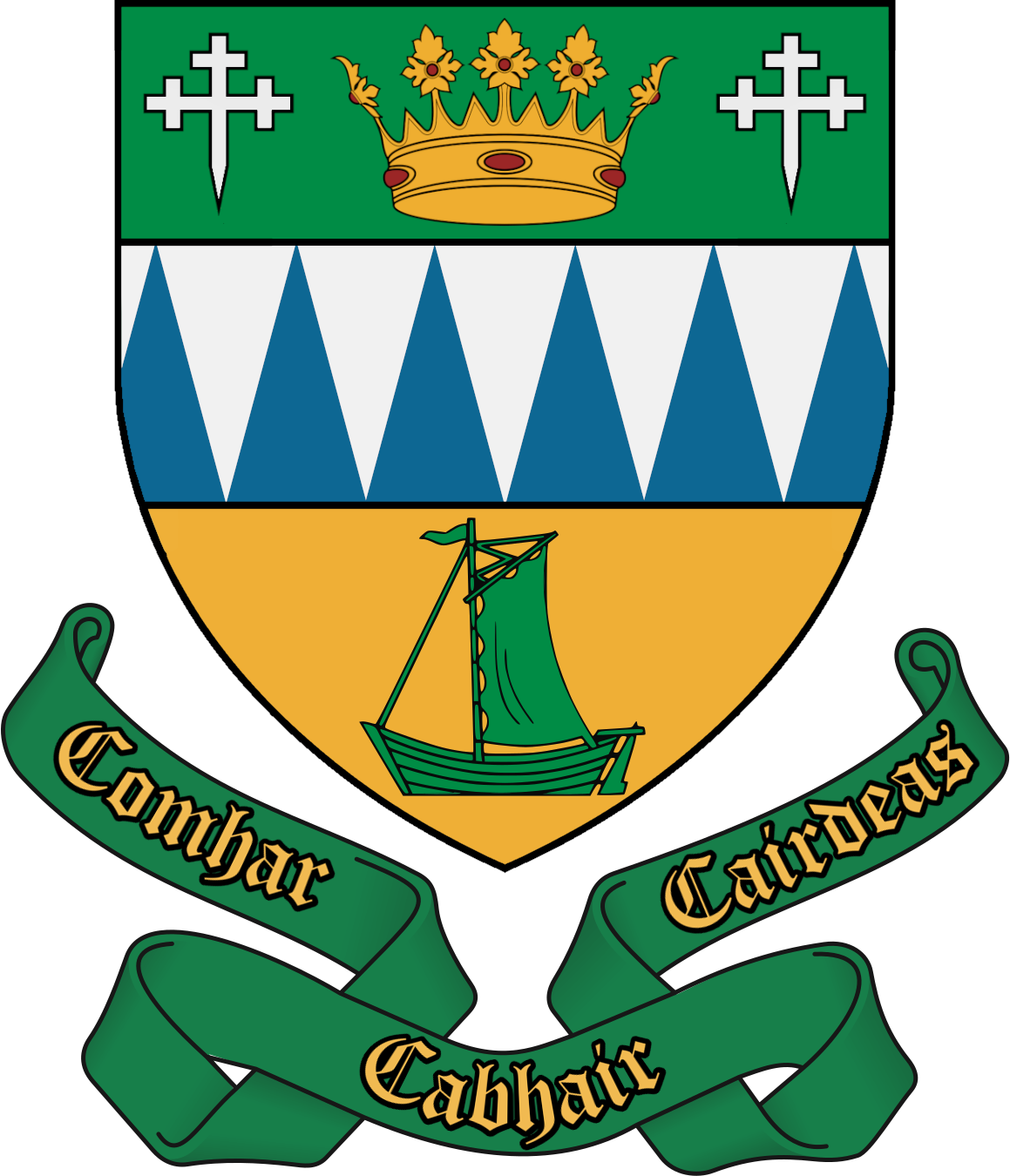
- Coat of arms
- Nickname: The Kingdom
- Motto: Comhar, Cabhair, Cairdeas (Irish) 'Co-operation, Help, Friendship'
- Interactive map of County Kerry
- Coordinates: 52°10′N 9°45′W
- Country: Ireland
- Province: Munster
- Region: Southern
- Established: c. 1300
- County town: Tralee

Government
  - Local authority: Kerry County Council
  - Dáil Éireann: Kerry
  - European Parliament: South

Area
  - Total: 4,807 km^{2} (1,856 sq mi)
  - Rank: 5th
- Highest elevation (Carrauntoohil): 1,039 m (3,409 ft)

Population (2022)
  - Total: 156,458
  - Rank: 15th
  - Density: 32.55/km^{2} (84.30/sq mi)
- Time zone: UTC±0 (WET)
  - Summer (DST): UTC+1 (IST)
- Eircode routing keys: V23, V31, V92, V93 (primarily)
- Telephone area codes: 064, 066, 068 (primarily)
- ISO 3166 code: IE-KY
- Vehicle index mark code: KY
- Website: Official website

County Kerry (Irish: Contae Chiarraí) is a county on the southwest coast of Ireland, within the province of Munster and the Southern Region. It is bordered by two other counties; Limerick to the east, and Cork to the south and east. It is separated from Clare to the north by the Shannon Estuary. With an area of 4,807 square kilometres (1,856 sq mi) and a population of 156,458 as of 2022, it is the 5th largest of Ireland's 32 counties by land area, and the 15th most populous. The governing local authority is Kerry County Council.

Bounded by the Atlantic Ocean, Kerry is Ireland's most westerly county. Its rugged coastline stretches for 886 kilometres (551 miles) and is characterised by bays, sea cliffs, beaches and many small offshore islands, of which the Blaskets and the Skelligs are the most notable. The county's peninsulas have a hilly to mountainous topography, with the MacGillycuddy's Reeks on Iveragh rising to over 1,000 m (3,300 ft). By contrast, its interior regions are mostly flat, interspersed with low mountain ranges such as the Stacks and the Mullaghareirks. The climate of Kerry is dominated by the North Atlantic Current and is usually mild and humid, with abundant precipitation. This allows for the growth of a wide variety of temperate and sub-tropical plants not typically found at such northerly latitudes.

The county is named after the Cíarraige people, who were the region's dominant pre-historic sept. County Kerry first appeared as a separate shire in 1232, and was at that time part of a royal grant given to the Earls of Desmond. The present-day county was divided for centuries between the Gaelic Kingdom of Desmond, ruled by the Mac Cárthaigh dynasty, and the Anglo-Norman Earldom of Desmond, ruled by the Geraldines. These two regions were merged in 1606 in the aftermath of the Nine Years' War.

Kerry has two official Gaeltacht regions, Gaeltacht Uíbh Ráthaigh on the Iveragh Peninsula and Gaeltacht Corca Dhuibhne on the Dingle Peninsula, the latter of which is the only Gaeltacht in Munster where Irish is the daily spoken language of the majority of the population. In the county as a whole, 40.2 percent of residents were able to speak Irish as of 2022. The regional dialect is Munster Irish, exemplified by the influential works of Blasket Islanders such as Peig Sayers, Muiris Ó Súilleabháin and Tomás Ó Criomhthain.

== Geography and subdivisions ==
Kerry is the fifth largest of Ireland's 32 traditional counties by area and the fifteenth largest by population. It is the second largest of Munster's six counties by area, and the fourth largest by population. It is bordered by two other counties: County Limerick to the east and County Cork to the south-east. The county town is Tralee although the Catholic diocesan seat is Killarney, which is one of Ireland's most famous tourist destinations. The Lakes of Killarney, an area of outstanding natural beauty, are located in Killarney National Park. The Reeks District is home to Carrauntoohil, Ireland's highest mountain at 1,039 m. The tip of the Dingle Peninsula is the westernmost point of Ireland.

=== Baronies ===
There are nine historic baronies in the county. While baronies continue to be officially defined units, they are no longer used for many administrative purposes. Their official status is illustrated by Placenames Orders made since 2003, where official Irish names of baronies are listed under "Administrative units".

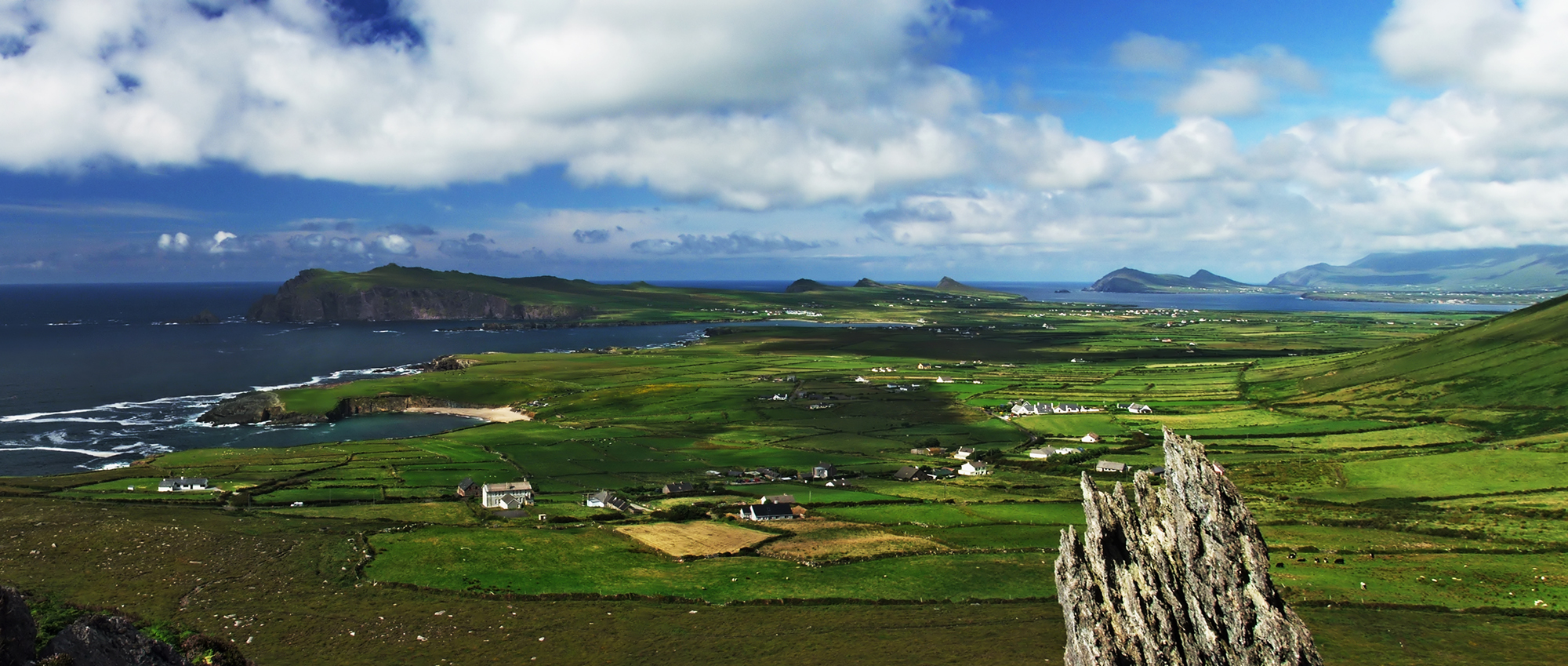
The Three Sisters, West Kerry

- Clanmaurice – Clann Mhuiris
- Corkaguiny – Corca Dhuibhne
- Dunkerron North – Dún Ciaráin Thuaidh
- Dunkerron South – Dún Ciaráin Theas
- Glanarought – Gleann na Ruachtaí
- Iraghticonnor – Oireacht Uí Chonchúir
- Iveragh (Peninsula) – Uíbh Ráthach
- Magunihy – Maigh gCoinchinn
- Trughanacmy – Triúcha an Aicme

=== Most populous towns ===
Rank	Town	Population (2022 census)
1	Tralee	26,079
2	Killarney	14,412
3	Listowel	4,794
4	Kenmare	2,566
5	Castleisland	2,564
6	Killorglin	2,163
7	Dingle	1,671
8	Ballybunion	1,618
9	Cahersiveen	1,297
10	Milltown	1,118

=== Physical geography ===
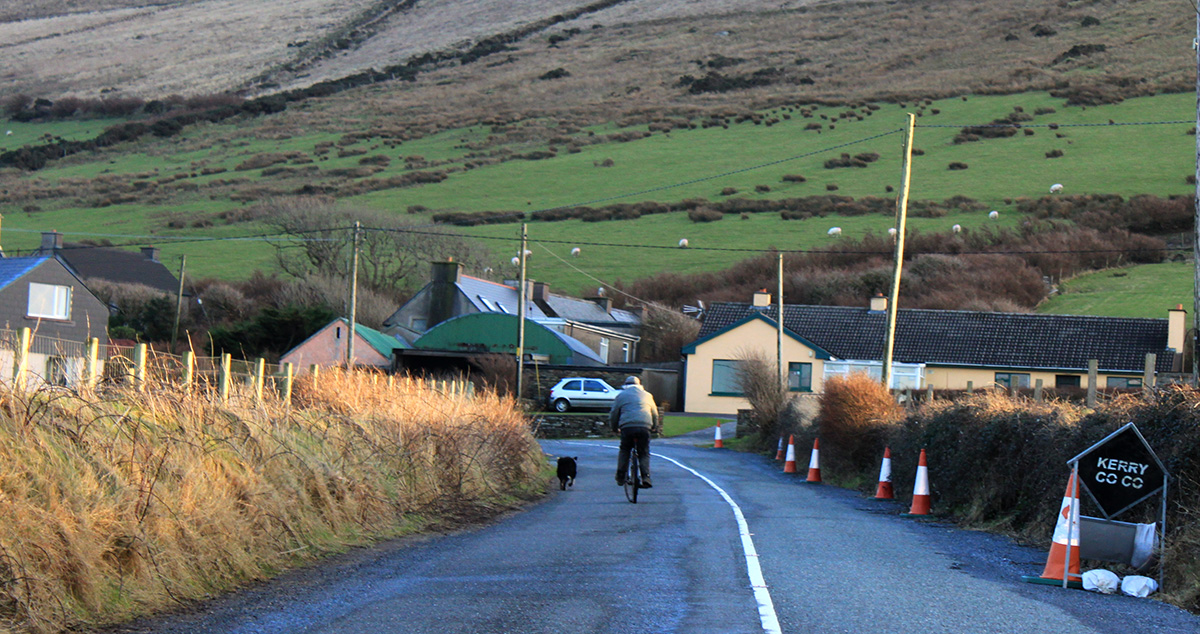
Near Teeravane, County Kerry

Kerry faces the Atlantic Ocean and, typically for an Eastern-Atlantic coastal region, features many peninsulas and inlets, principally the Dingle Peninsula, the Iveragh Peninsula, and the Beara Peninsula. The county is bounded on the west by the Atlantic Ocean and on the north by the River Shannon. Kerry is one of the most mountainous regions of Ireland and its three highest mountains, Carrauntoohil, Beenkeragh and Caher, all part of the MacGillycuddy's Reeks range.

Just off the coast are a number of islands, including the Blasket Islands, Valentia Island and the Skelligs. Skellig Michael is a World Heritage Site, famous for the medieval monastery clinging to the island's cliffs. The county contains the extreme west point of Ireland, Dunmore Head on the Dingle Peninsula, or including islands, Tearaght Island, part of the Blaskets. The most westerly inhabited area of Ireland is Dún Chaoin, on the Dingle Peninsula. The River Feale, the River Laune and the Roughty River flow through Kerry, into the Atlantic.

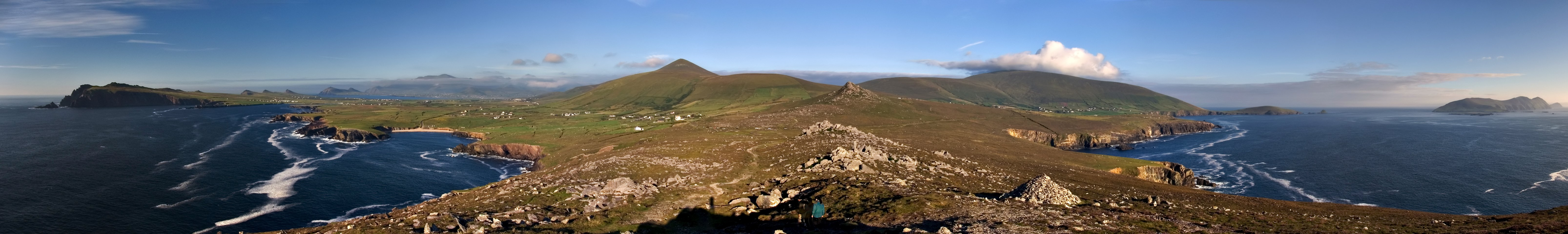
Dingle Peninsula

=== Climate ===
The North Atlantic Current, part of the Gulf Stream, flows north past Kerry and the west coast of Ireland, resulting in milder temperatures than would otherwise be expected at the 52 North latitude. This means that subtropical plants such as the strawberry tree and tree ferns, not normally found in northern Europe, thrive in the area.

Because of the mountainous area and the prevailing southwesterly winds, Kerry is among the regions with the highest rainfall in Ireland. Owing to its location, there has been a weather reporting station on Valentia for many centuries. The Irish record for rainfall in one day is 243.5 mm (9.59 in), recorded at Cloore Lake in Kerry in 1993.

In 1986 the remnants of Hurricane Charley crossed over Kerry as an extratropical storm causing extensive rainfall, flooding and damage.

== History ==
Historical population
Year	Pop.	±% p.a.
1461	6,173	—
1471	6,212	+0.06%
1500	6,331	+0.07%
1510	6,355	+0.04%
1515	6,404	+0.15%
1530	6,445	+0.04%
1535	6,616	+0.53%
1550	6,888	+0.27%
1555	6,923	+0.10%
1580	6,970	+0.03%
1585	7,032	+0.18%
1600	7,085	+0.05%
1610	7,111	+0.04%
1611	7,180	+0.97%
1613	7,212	+0.22%
1616	7,445	+1.07%
1621	7,616	+0.46%
1631	7,710	+0.12%
1641	7,955	+0.31%
1645	7,999	+0.14%
1651	8,045	+0.10%
1653	8,210	+1.02%
1659	8,390	+0.36%
1821	216,185	+2.03%
1831	263,126	+1.98%
1841	293,880	+1.11%
1851	238,254	−2.08%
1861	201,800	−1.65%
1871	196,586	−0.26%
1881	201,039	+0.22%
1891	179,136	−1.15%
1901	165,726	−0.78%
1911	159,691	−0.37%
1926	149,171	−0.45%
1936	139,834	−0.64%
1946	133,893	−0.43%
1951	126,644	−1.11%
1956	122,072	−0.73%
1961	116,458	−0.94%
1966	112,785	−0.64%
1971	112,772	−0.00%
1979	120,356	+0.82%
1981	122,770	+1.00%
1986	124,159	+0.23%
1991	121,894	−0.37%
1996	126,130	+0.69%
2002	132,527	+0.83%
2006	139,835	+1.35%
2011	145,502	+0.80%
2016	147,707	+0.30%
2022	155,258	+0.83%

Kerry (Irish: Ciarraí or in the older spelling Ciarraighe) means the "people of Ciar" which was the name of the Gaelic tribe who lived in part of the present county. The legendary founder of the tribe was Ciar, son of Fergus mac Róich. In Old Irish "Ciar" meant black or dark brown, and the word continues in use in modern Irish as an adjective describing a dark complexion. The suffix raighe, meaning people/tribe, is found in various -ry place names in Ireland, such as Osry—Osraighe Deer-People/Tribe. The county's nickname is the Kingdom.

=== Lordship of Ireland ===
On 27 August 1329, by Letters Patent, Maurice FitzGerald, 1st Earl of Desmond was confirmed in the feudal seniority of the entire county palatine of Kerry, to him and his heirs male, to hold of the Crown by the service of one knight's fee. In the 15th century, the majority of the area now known as County Kerry was still part of the County Desmond, the west Munster seat of the Earl of Desmond, a branch of the Hiberno-Norman FitzGerald dynasty, known as the Geraldines.

=== Kingdom of Ireland ===
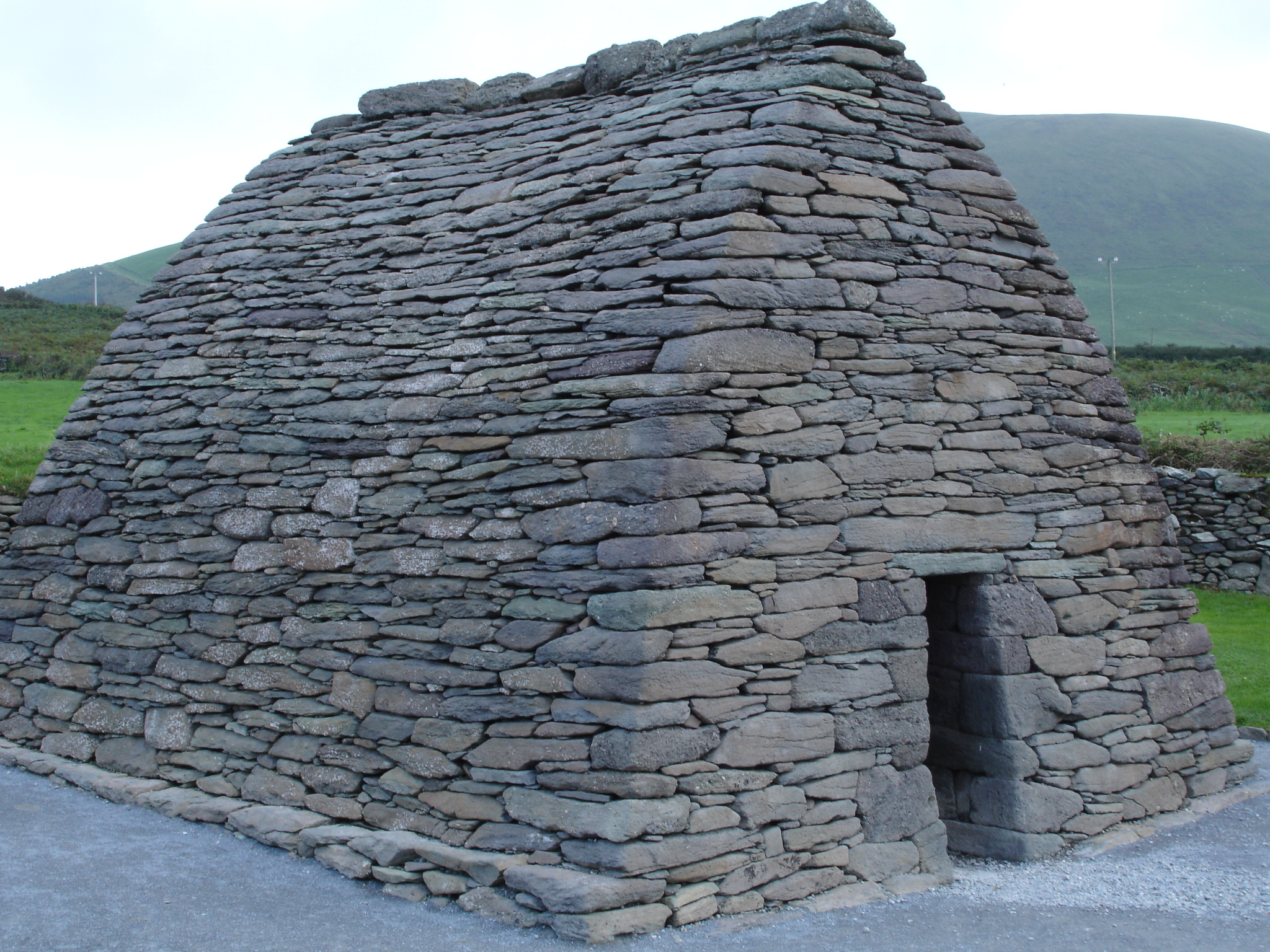
Gallarus Oratory near Dingle, which dates back to the 6th century.

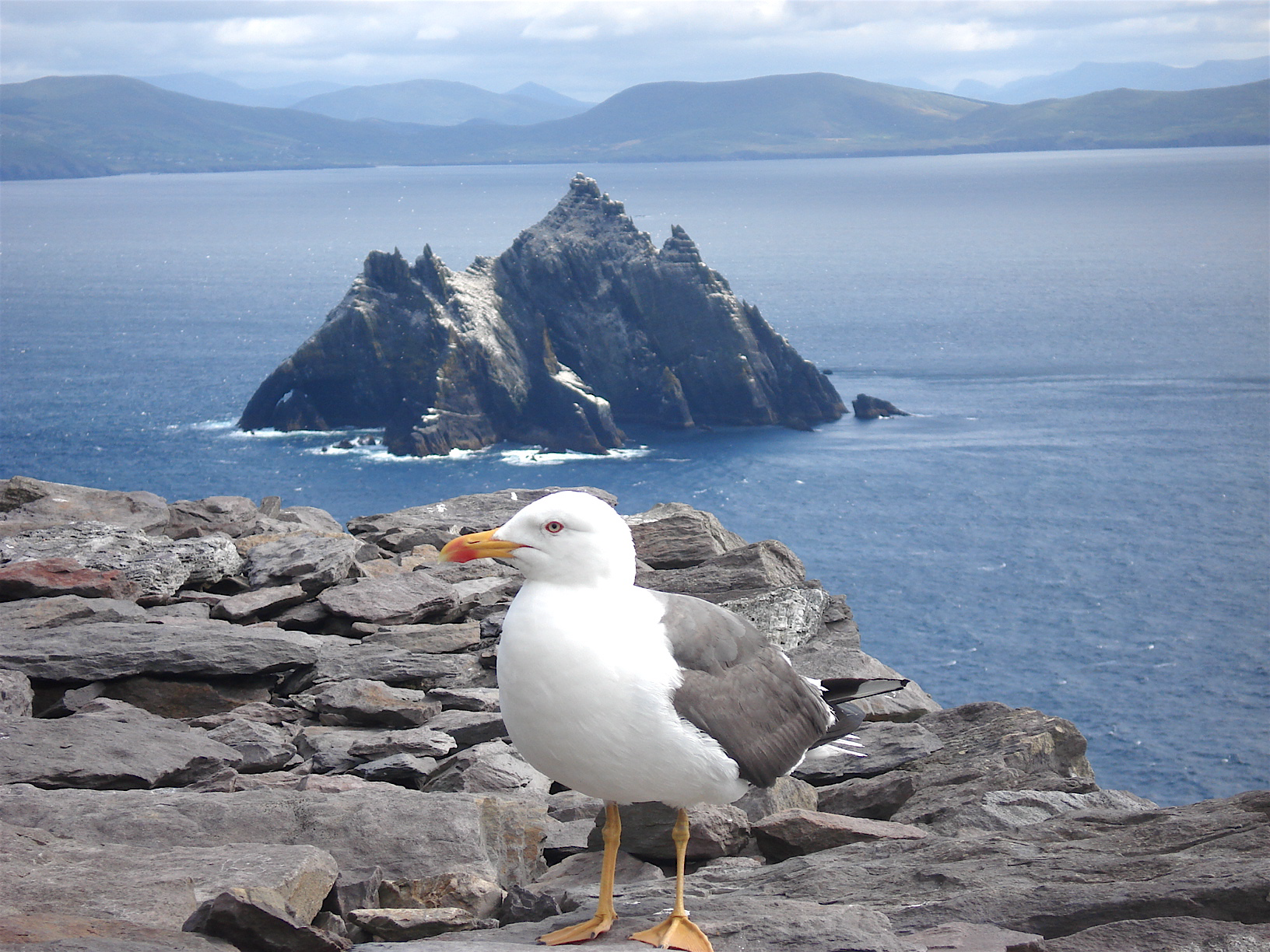
Little Skellig, as seen from Skellig Michael.

In 1580, during the Second Desmond Rebellion, one of the most infamous massacres of the Sixteenth century, the Siege of Smerwick, took place at Dún an Óir near Ard na Caithne (Smerwick) at the tip of the Dingle Peninsula. The 600-strong Italian, Spanish and Irish papal invasion force of James Fitzmaurice Fitzgerald was besieged by the English forces and massacred.

In 1588, when the fleet of the Spanish Armada in Ireland were returning to Spain during stormy weather, many of its ships sought shelter at the Blasket Islands and some were wrecked.

During the Nine Years' War, Kerry was again the scene of conflict, as the O'Sullivan Beare clan joined the rebellion. In 1602 their castle at Dunboy was besieged and taken by English troops. Donal O'Sullivan Beare, in an effort to escape English retribution and to reach his allies in Ulster, marched all the clan's members and dependants to the north of Ireland. Due to harassment by hostile forces and freezing weather, very few of the 1,000 O'Sullivans who set out reached their destination.

In the aftermath of the War, much of the native owned land in Kerry was confiscated and given to English settlers or 'planters'. The head of the MacCarthy Mor family, Florence MacCarthy was imprisoned in London and his lands were divided between his relatives and colonists from England, such as the Browne family.

In the 1640s Kerry was engulfed by the Irish Rebellion of 1641, an attempt by Irish Catholics to take power in the Protestant Kingdom of Ireland. The rebellion in Kerry was led by Donagh McCarthy, 1st Viscount Muskerry. His son the Earl of Clancarty held the county during the subsequent Irish Confederate Wars and his forces were among the last to surrender to the Cromwellian conquest of Ireland in 1652. The last stronghold to fall was Ross Castle, near Killarney.

=== The Famine ===
In the 18th and 19th centuries Kerry became increasingly populated by poor tenant farmers, who came to rely on the potato as their main food source. As a result, when the potato crop failed in 1845, Kerry was very hard hit by the Great Irish Famine of 1845–49. In the wake of the famine, many thousands of poor farmers emigrated to seek a better life in America and elsewhere. Kerry was to remain a source of emigration until recent times (up to the 1980s). The earliest criminal gang in USA were the Kerryonians. Another long term consequence of the famine was the Land War of the 1870s and 1880s, in which tenant farmers agitated, sometimes violently, for better terms from their landlords.

The population of Kerry dropped significantly during the Famine, with a 19% drop in population during the Census of 1841 and 1851.

=== War of Independence and Civil War ===
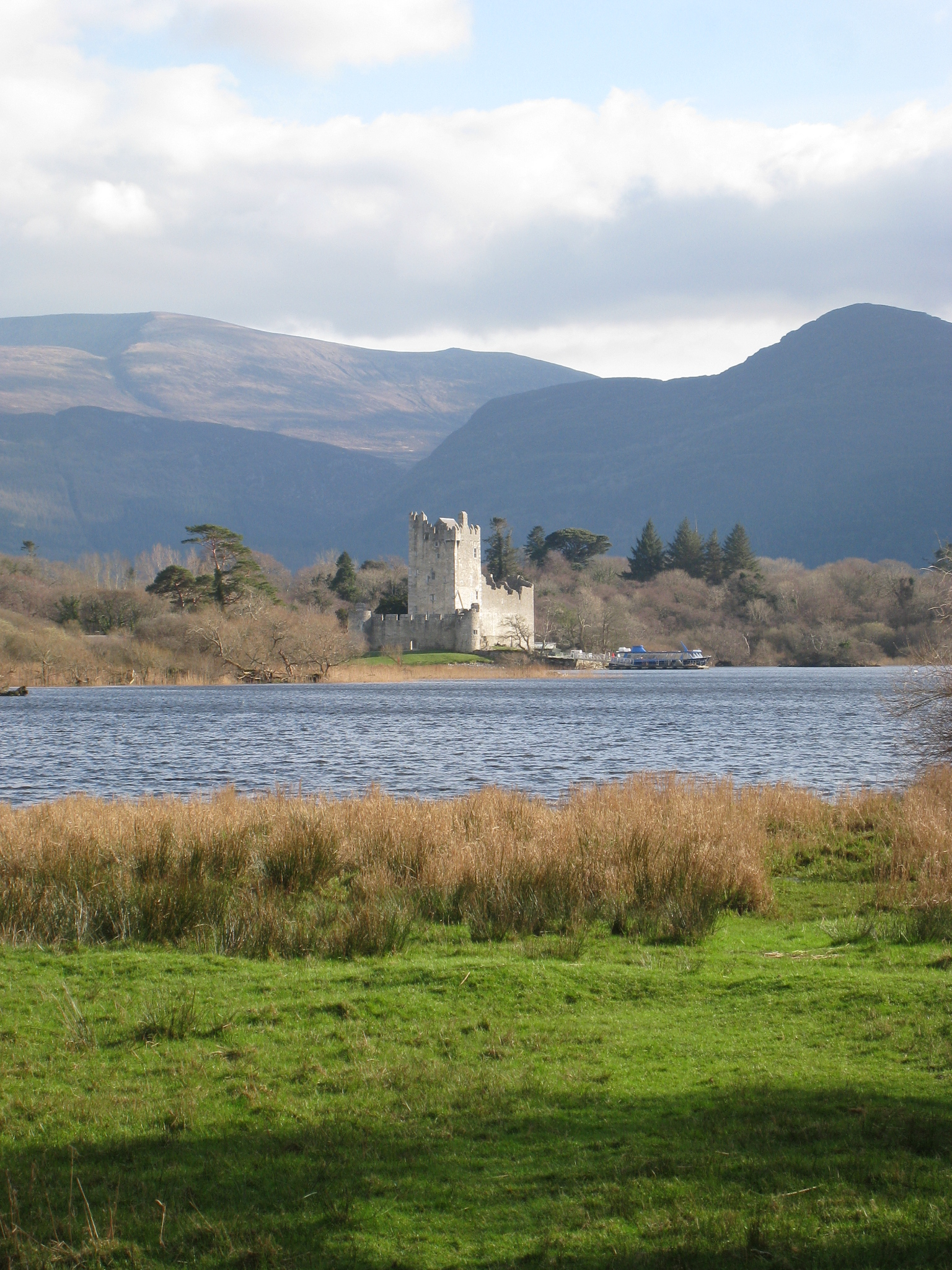
Ross Castle and Lough Leane, Killarney National Park.

In the 20th century, Kerry was one of the counties most affected by the Irish War of Independence (1919–21) and Irish Civil War (1922–23). In the war of Independence, the Irish Republican Army fought a guerilla war against the Royal Irish Constabulary, and British military. One of the more prominent incidents in the conflict in Kerry was the siege of Tralee in November 1920, when the Black and Tans placed in Tralee burned many homes, and shot dead a number of local people in retaliation for the IRA killing of five local policemen the night before. On 10 December 1920 Martial law was declared in the Counties of Kerry, Cork and Limerick. Another incident was the Headford Junction ambush in spring 1921, when IRA units ambushed a train carrying British soldiers outside Killarney. About ten British soldiers, three civilians and two IRA men were killed in the ensuing gun battle. Violence between the IRA and the British was ended in July 1921, but nine men, four British soldiers and five IRA men, were killed in a shoot-out in Castleisland on the day of the truce itself, indicating the bitterness of the conflict in Kerry.

Following the Anglo-Irish Treaty, most of the Kerry IRA units opposed the settlement. One exception existed in Listowel where a pro-Treaty garrison was established by local Flying Column commandant Thomas Kennelly in February 1922. This unit consisted of 200 regular soldiers along with officers and NCOs. A batch of rifles, machine guns and a Crossley tender were sent from Dublin. Listowel would remain a base for those supporting the treaty throughout the conflict. The town was eventually overcome by superior numbers of anti-Treaty forces belonging to the Kerry No. 2 and 3 Brigades in June 1922. In the ensuing civil war between pro- and anti-treaty elements, Kerry was perhaps the worst affected area of Ireland. Initially the county was held by the Anti-Treaty IRA but it was taken for the Irish Free State after seaborne landings by National Army troops at Fenit, Tarbert and Kenmare in August 1922. Thereafter the county saw a bitter guerilla war between men who had been comrades only a year previously. The republicans, or "irregulars", mounted a number of successful actions, for example attacking and briefly re-taking Kenmare in September 1922. In March 1923 Kerry saw a series of massacres of republican prisoners by National Army soldiers, in reprisal for the ambush of their men—the most notorious being the killing of eight men with mines at Ballyseedy, near Tralee. The internecine conflict was brought to an end in May 1923 as the rule of law was re-established following the death of IRA Chief of Staff Liam Lynch, and the order by Frank Aiken to dump all arms.

== Local government ==
The island of Ireland, showing location of County Kerry.

=== County council ===
The local authority for the county is Kerry County Council. The council provides a number of services including planning, roads maintenance, fire brigade, council housing, water supply, waste collection, recycling and landfill, higher education grants and funding for arts and culture.

The county is divided into five municipal districts with local responsibility: Corca Dhuibhne–Castleisland, Kenmare, Killarney, Listowel, and Tralee.

=== Town councils ===
Prior to the 2014 local elections held on 23 May 2014, Killarney, Listowel and Tralee each had town councils. They were abolished under the Local Government Reform Act 2014.

== Parliamentary representation ==
Following boundary changes in 2016, Kerry is represented in Dáil Éireann by five TDs returned from a single Dáil constituency of Kerry.

== Culture ==
As a region on the extremity of Ireland, the culture of Kerry was less susceptible to outside influences and has preserved the Irish language, as well as Irish traditional music, song and dance. The Sliabh Luachra area of northeast Kerry, that borders Limerick and Cork, is renowned for its traditional music, dance and song, especially its slides, polkas and fiddle playing. The Siamsa Tíre centre in Tralee is a hub of traditional Irish pastimes. Corca Dhuibhne and Uíbh Ráthach are considered Gaeltacht regions and Irish culture is also very strong in these areas.

The Blasket Islands off the Dingle Peninsula are known for their rich literary heritage; authors such as Peig Sayers, Muiris Ó Súilleabháin and Tomás Ó Criomhthain have all written books about life on the islands, which were evacuated in 1953 due to increasingly extreme weather conditions that made them uninhabitable. John B Keane, a native of Listowel, is considered one of Ireland's greatest playwrights and is known for his works such as The Field, Sive and Big Maggie. The annual Listowel Writers' Week Festival serves as a celebration of Irish writers past and present.

== Sport ==
=== Gaelic games ===
Kerry is known for its senior Gaelic football team. Gaelic football is by far the dominant sport in the county, and Kerry has the most successful of all football teams; the Kerry footballers have won the Sam Maguire cup 39 times, with the next nearest team Dublin on 31 wins. Hurling is popular at club level in north Kerry, although the county has only won one All-Ireland Senior Hurling Championship, in 1891. The senior team currently compete in the Joe McDonagh Cup.

=== Association football ===
The Kerry District League is the main competition for association football in the county. Tralee Dynamos have represented Kerry in the A Championship, while they and Killarney Celtic also competed in the Munster Senior League during the late 1990s and early 2000s. In 2023 Kerry F.C. entered the League of Ireland First Division for the first time.

=== Cricket ===
Cricket is played in County Kerry by County Kerry Cricket Club. They play their home games at the Oyster Oval near Tralee.

== Irish language ==
In 2011 there were 6,083 Irish language speakers in County Kerry, with 4,978 native speakers within the Kerry Gaeltacht. This does not count the 1,105 attending the four Gaelscoils (Irish language primary schools) and two Gaelcholáiste (Irish language secondary schools) outside the Kerry Gaeltacht.

== Places of interest ==
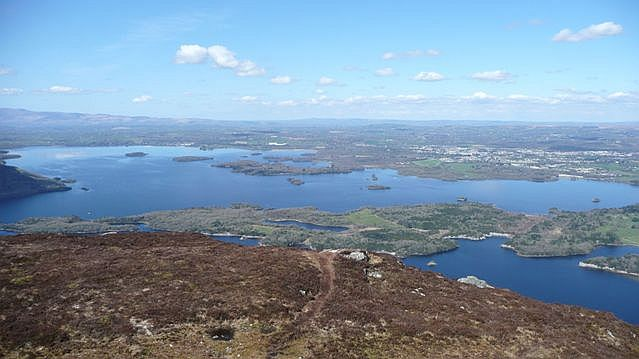
Lakes of Killarney

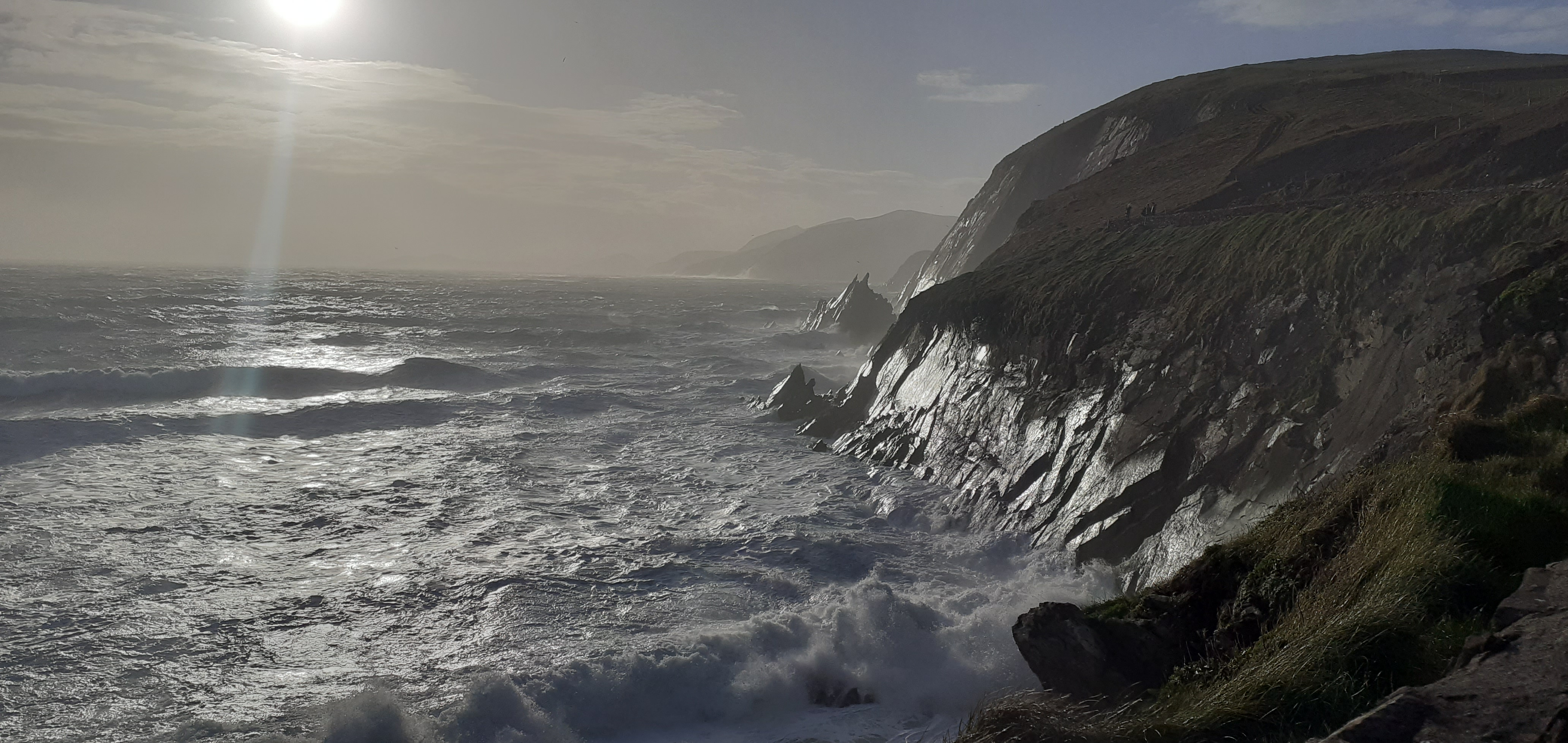
Cliffs on the Dingle Peninsula

Kerry, with its mountains, lakes and nearly 1,000 kilometres of Atlantic coastline is among the most scenic areas in Ireland and is among the most significant tourist destinations in Ireland. Killarney is the centre of the tourism industry, which is a significant element of the economy in Kerry. The Kerry Way, Dingle Way and Beara Way are walking routes in the county. The Ring of Kerry on the Iveragh Peninsula is a popular route for tourists and cyclists. The pedestrian version is the scenic Kerry Way which follows ancient paths generally higher than that adopted by the Ring of Kerry.

Kerry has an abundance of archaeological sites. The earliest evidence of human settlement dates to the Mesolithic period. The county has a notably high concentration of open-air Atlantic rock art, which is believed to date to the Late Neolithic / Early Bronze Age period (2300-1500BC). This rock art is scattered throughout the county and exists in dense clusters on the Iveragh and Dingle peninsulas. These carvings form part of a tradition which stretches across Atlantic Europe and are distinct from the megalithic art of the type found at Newgrange. Kerry has many Bronze Age monuments including standing stones, wedge tombs, boulder burials, and stone circles, along with Iron Age forts. Like the rest of Ireland, Kerry has large numbers of monuments from the Early Christian period, such as ring forts, churches, cross-inscribed stones, holy wells, saints' graves, and ogham stones, along with Medieval castles and churches.

Attractions:

- Ballinskelligs
- Banna Strand
- Blasket Islands
- Blennerville Windmill
- Caragh Lake
- Carrauntoohil
- Conor Pass
- Dingle Peninsula
- Eightercua
- Ecclesiastical sites at Ardfert
- Fenit Harbour
- Gallarus Oratory
- Killarney National Park
- Kerry County Museum
- Kerry Woollen Mills
- Lakes of Killarney
- Lartigue Monorail
- Maharees
- Mount Brandon
- Muckross House
- Rattoo Round Tower and Sheela na Gig
- Ring of Kerry
- Ross Castle
- Rossbeigh beach
- Scotia's Grave
- Siamsa Tíre
- Skellig Michael
- Torc Waterfall
- Uragh Stone Circle
- Valentia Island

== Media ==
County Kerry has two local newspapers, The Kerryman and Kerry's Eye, both published in Tralee.

The county has a commercial radio station, Radio Kerry, which commenced operations in 1990. RTÉ Raidió na Gaeltachta has a studio in Baile na nGall in the west Kerry gaeltacht. Spin South West has a studio in Tralee, which commenced operations in 2016.

== Infrastructure ==
=== Road ===
The main National Primary Routes into Kerry are the N21 road from Limerick and the N22 road from Cork, each terminating in Tralee. Kerry Airport is situated on the N23 road between Castleisland and Farranfore which connects the N21 and N22. Within Kerry the main National Secondary Routes include the well-known Ring of Kerry which follows the N70 road that circles the Iveragh Peninsula and links at Kenmare with the N71 road to west Cork. The N86 road connects Tralee with Dingle along the Dingle Peninsula, while the N69 road from Limerick links Listowel and Tralee through north Kerry.

==== Greenways ====
There is a developing greenway network, known as the "Kingdom of Kerry Greenways", across the county. The North Kerry (part of the Great Southern Trail), South Kerry and Tralee-Fenit greenways are under-development or in the planning phases.

=== Rail ===
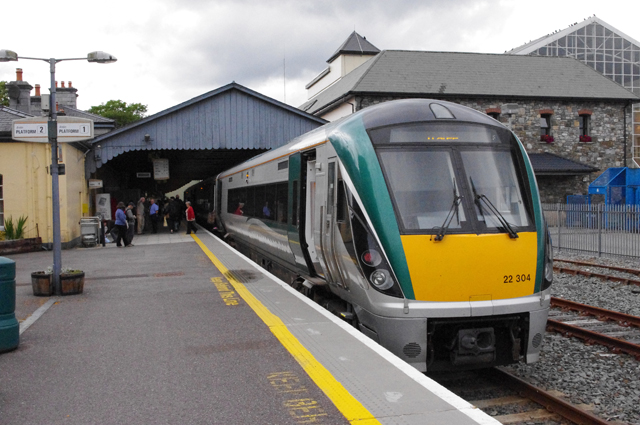
Killarney railway station

Kerry is served by rail at Tralee railway station, Farranfore railway station, Killarney railway station and Rathmore railway station which connect to Cork and Dublin Heuston, via Mallow.

Branch line services existed to each of the peninsulas (Beara, Iveragh and Dingle) and also to the north of the county. They were closed during the rationalisations of the 1950s and 1960s.

- Tralee and Dingle Light Railway: a narrow-gauge railway that closed in July 1953.
- Kenmare via Headford Junction: (8 miles outside Killarney) closed in early 1960.
- Valentia Harbour via Farranfore: also closed in early 1960. The Gleesk Viaduct near Kells, the viaduct at Killorglin, and many other structures on the line still exist.
- Listowel was served via the North Kerry line, which extended from Tralee to Limerick. Passenger service ceased in 1963, freight in 1983 and the lines were pulled up in 1988.
- Fenit was served via a branch off the North Kerry line until 1978; the rails are still in place.

Listowel to Ballybunion had the distinction of operating experimental Lartigue Monorail services from 1882 to 1924. A 500m section was re-established in 2003. A road-car route, the Prince of Wales Route, was a link from Bantry to Killarney, operated by the Cork, Bandon and South Coast Railway as a service for tourists.

=== Bus ===
Bus Éireann operates an extensive bus service network on routes throughout the county, with connection hubs in Killarney and Tralee.

Various local link services also run throughout Kerry such as the soon to be launched 274 from Tralee to Tarbert via Ardfert, Ballyheigue, Ballyduff and Ballybunion. Note that this new Local Link 274 will replace the return journey on the Bus Eireann 274. See Local Link Kerry for all buses operated by them throughout the county.

=== Air ===
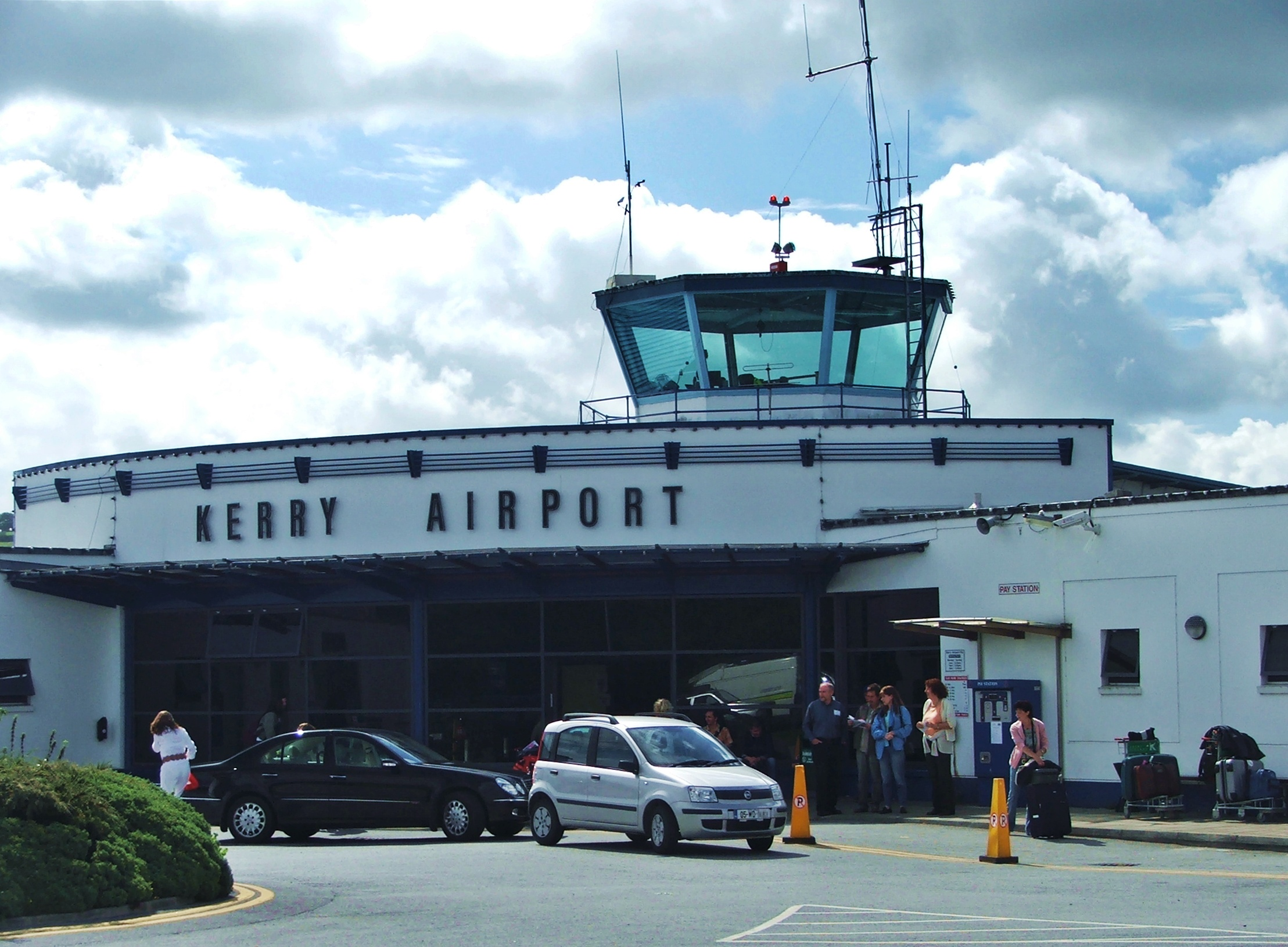
Kerry Airport

Kerry Airport is located at Farranfore in the centre of the county and has operated scheduled services since 1989. Destinations served as of 2025 are Dublin, London (Stansted & Luton), Manchester, Frankfurt-Hahn Airport, Faro, Portugal and Alicante all operated by Ryanair, as well as Brittany, Normandy, Pyrenees, and Dordogne operated by Chalair. The airport is served by Farranfore railway station.

=== Sea ===
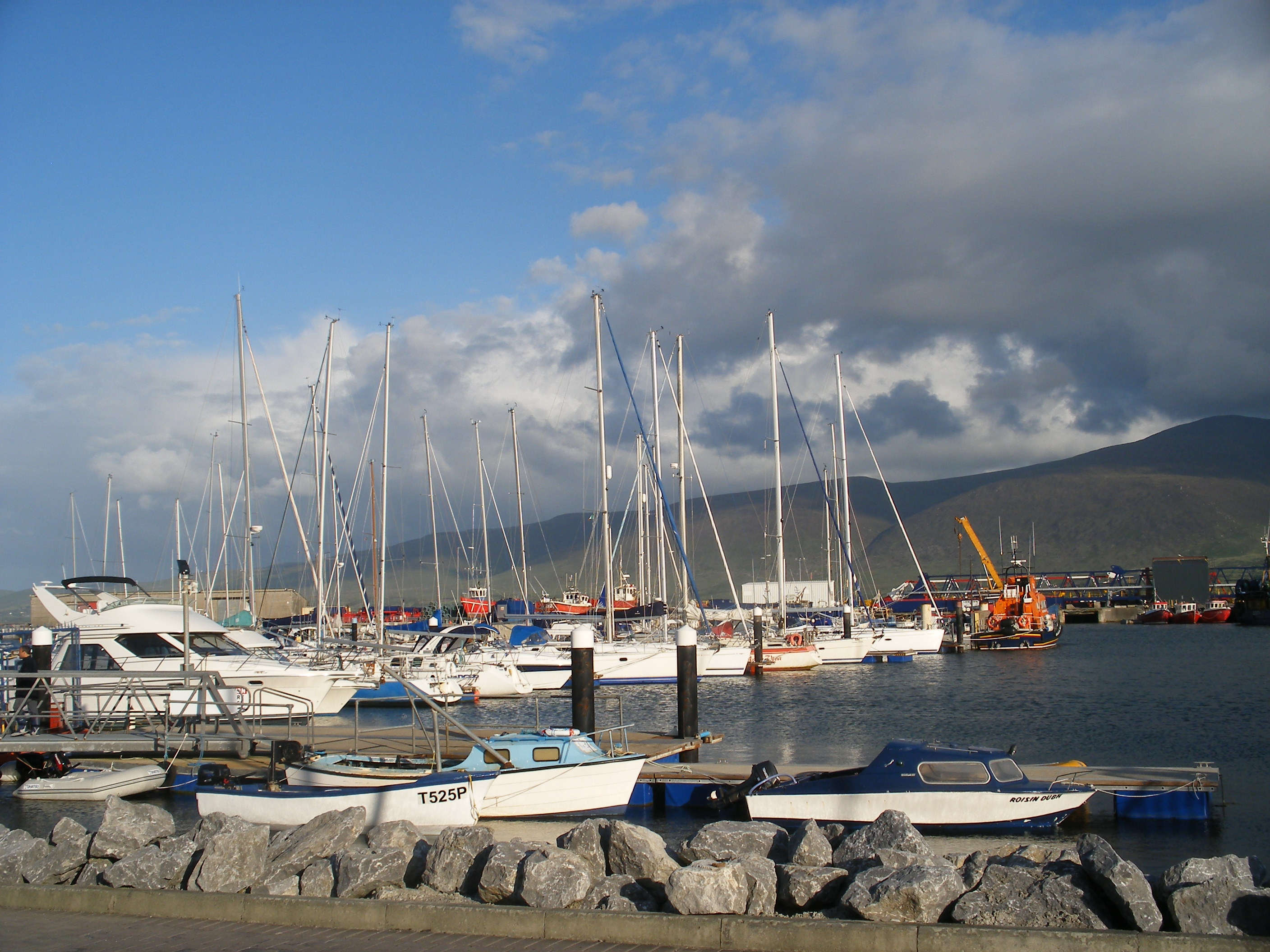
Fenit Marina

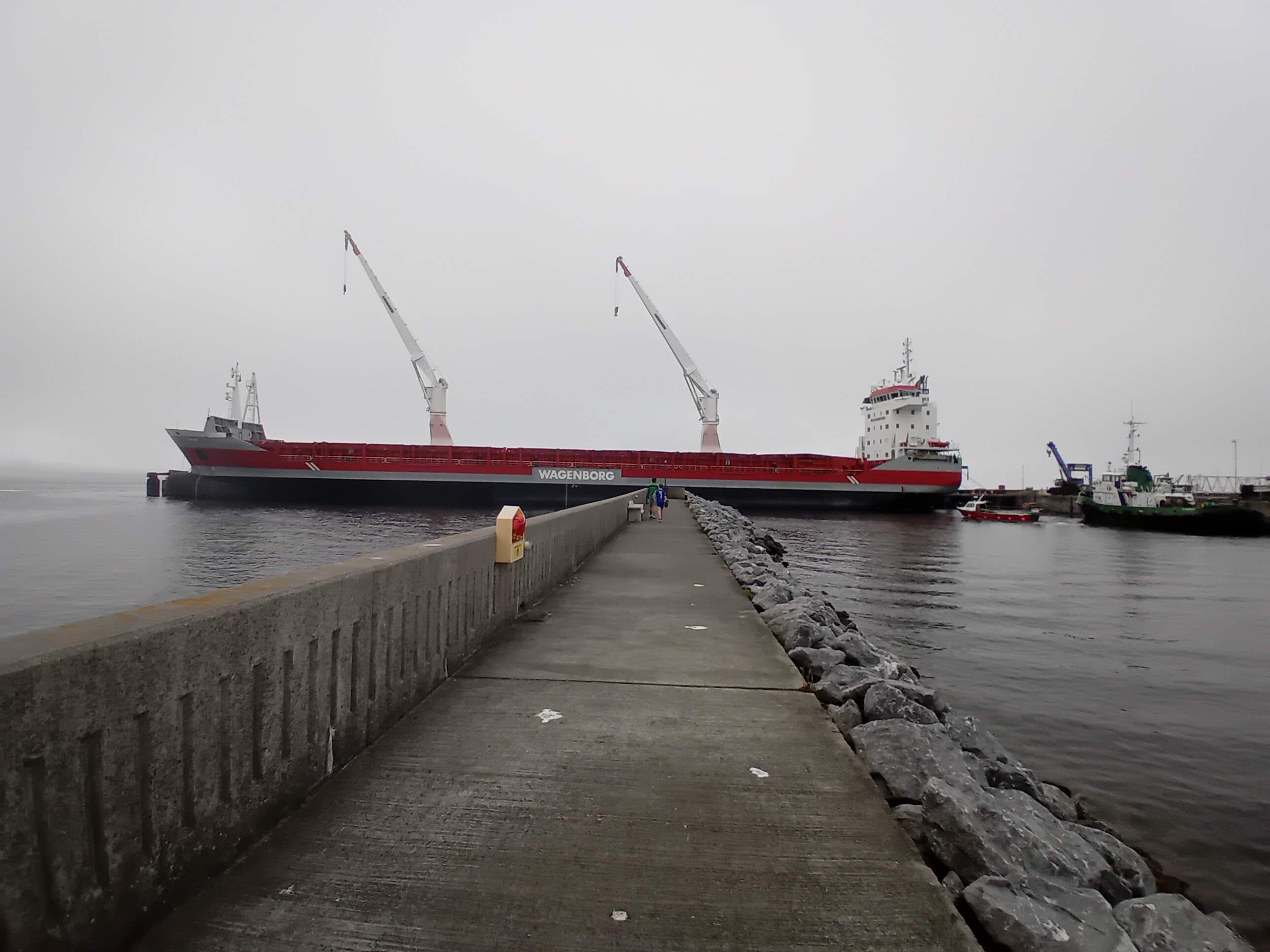
A cargo ship in Fenit port

Fenit harbour near Tralee is a regional harbour capable of handling ships of up to 17,000 tonnes. Large container cranes from Liebherr in Killarney are regularly exported worldwide. A rail-link to the port was closed in the 1970s. The harbour at Dingle is one of Ireland's secondary fishing ports, and is visited by Cruise ships in the summer. In the north of the county, a ferry service operates from Tarbert to Killimer in County Clare.

=== Hospitals ===
Hospitals in Kerry include the public University Hospital Kerry which is the second-largest acute hospital in the Health Service Executive South Region. It serves as the main hospital for County Kerry and also serves the people in parts of north Cork and west Limerick. Other hospitals include the private Bon Secours Hospital in Tralee and community hospitals in Cahirciveen, Dingle, Kenmare, Killarney and Listowel.

=== Education ===
Munster Technological University (MTU), formerly the Institute of Technology, Tralee, is the main third-level institution in the county. Two of the university's campuses are located in Kerry, both in Tralee. What is now MTU Kerry North Campus was established in 1977 as the Regional Technical College, Tralee but acquired the name "Institute of Technology, Tralee" in 1997. It merged with Cork Institute of Technology in 2019 to form the Munster Technological University. It has an enrolment of about 3,500 students. The institute has two campuses: the North Campus (opened in Dromtacker in 2001) and the South Campus (opened in Clash in 1977) approximately 2.4 km (1.5 mi) apart.

== Septs, families, and titles ==
A number of Irish surnames are derived from septs who hail from the Kerry area, such as Falvey, Foley, McCarthy, Murphy, O'Connor, O'Moriarty, Clifford, Kennelly, McGrath, O'Carroll, O'Sullivan, O'Connell, O'Donoghue, O'Shea, Quill, Scannell, Stack, Sugrue and Tangney.

The area was also home to the Hiberno-Norman families, the FitzMaurices and the Desmonds, a branch of the FitzGeralds.

Titles in the British Peerage of Ireland with a family seat in Kerry are:

- the Knight of Kerry – a branch of Fitzgeralds who had lands at Valentia Island
- the Earl of Kenmare (also Viscount Castlerosse, Viscount Kenmare and Baron Castlerosse) – the descendants of Sir Valentine Browne who was awarded lands in Killarney
- the Earl of Desmond – the Fitzgeralds of Desmond who had lands in North Kerry until they were seized at the end of the Desmond Rebellions
- the Marquess of Lansdowne (also Earl of Shelburne, Baron Dunkeron) – the descendants of Sir William Petty who was awarded lands in Kenmare and elsewhere
- the Earl of Kerry (also Baron Kerry, Viscount Clanmaurice) – the Fitzmaurice family
- the Earl of Listowel – the Hare family
- the Baron Ventry – the Mullins family who had lands in the Dingle Peninsula, including Ventry

Viscount Valentia appears to have been associated with lands in County Armagh, rather than Kerry. The title Baron Monteagle of Brandon refers to Brandon, County Kerry.

== People ==
Associated People:

- Roger Casement
- Wolfe Tone
- Cearbhall Ó Dálaigh

Historical:

- Daniel O'Connell
- Thomas Ashe
- Annie Chemis
- Tom Crean
- Con Cremin
- Austin Stack
- Horatio Kitchener
- Richard Kelliher
- Jennifer Musa
- Charlie Daly
- Maurice Moynihan
- Patrick Edward Connor
- William Melville
- Richard Cantillon
- John Connors
- Saint Brendan
- Trevor Chute

Literary & Musical:

- Con Houlihan
- Thomas O'Brien Butler
- Malachi Martin
- Julia Clifford
- Jerome Connor
- Canon James Goodman
- John B. Keane
- Brendan Kennelly
- Denis Murphy
- Thomas MacGreevy
- Ernest John Moeran
- Paula Murrihy
- Tomás Ó Criomhthain
- Eoghan Rua Ó Súilleabháin
- Padraig O'Keeffe
- Arthur O'Leary
- Muiris Ó Súilleabháin
- Aogán Ó Rathaille
- Peig Sayers
- Larry Mathews
- Christie Hennessy
- John Moriarty
- Paddy Cronin
- Patrick S. Dinneen
- Mark Lanegan

Sport:

- Danny Barnes
- Edward Barrett
- John Barrett
- Colm Cooper
- Patrick Clifford
- Jack Doyle
- Mick Doyle
- Maurice Fitzgerald
- Tony Flavin
- Thos Foley
- Paul Galvin
- Mick Galwey
- JJ Hanrahan
- David Higgins
- Liam Higgins
- Robert Hilliard
- Moss Keane
- Tadhg Kennelly
- Jerry Kiernan
- John Lawlor
- Jack McKenna
- Bryan Cooper
- Ultan Dillane
- Mick O'Connell
- Mick O'Dwyer
- Gillian O'Sullivan
- Paul Griffin
- Darragh Ó Sé
- Pat Spillane
- Jack O'Shea
- Mark O'Connor
- Tommy Walsh
- Sean Wight

Film/Stage/Radio:

- Michael Fassbender
- Eamon Kelly
- Fodhla Cronin O'Reilly
- Richard Wall
- Jessie Buckley
- Timothy V. Murphy

Political:

- Martin Ferris
- Jackie Healy-Rae
- Joe Higgins
- Thomas O'Driscoll
- Dick Spring

Business:

- Richard Cantillon

Fashion:

- Don O'Neill

== See also ==
- Wild Atlantic Way

== Sources ==
- Falkiner, Caesar Litton (1903). "The Counties of Ireland: An Historical Sketch of Their Origin, Constitution, and Gradual Delimitation". Proceedings of the Royal Irish Academy. XXIV, Section C.
