= List of Irish counties by area =

This is a list of the counties of Ireland ordered by area. 26 of the 32 counties are in the Republic of Ireland and 6 are in Northern Ireland.

The 32 traditional counties of Ireland

Counties of Ireland by area
Rank	County	Area		Traditional province	Jurisdiction	Ref.
Rank	County	(km^{2})	(mi^{2})	Traditional province	Jurisdiction	Ref.
1	Cork	7,508	2,899	Munster	Republic of Ireland	
2	Galway	6,151	2,375	Connacht	Republic of Ireland	
3	Mayo	5,588	2,158	Connacht	Republic of Ireland	
4	Donegal	4,860	1,880	Ulster	Republic of Ireland	
5	Kerry	4,807	1,856	Munster	Republic of Ireland	
6	Tipperary	4,305	1,662	Munster	Republic of Ireland	
7	Clare	3,450	1,330	Munster	Republic of Ireland	
8	Tyrone	3,266	1,261	Ulster	Northern Ireland	
9	Antrim	3,086	1,192	Ulster	Northern Ireland	
10	Limerick	2,756	1,064	Munster	Republic of Ireland	
11	Roscommon	2,548	984	Connacht	Republic of Ireland	
12	Down	2,489	961	Ulster	Northern Ireland	
13	Wexford	2,367	914	Leinster	Republic of Ireland	
14	Meath	2,342	904	Leinster	Republic of Ireland	
15	Londonderry	2,118	818	Ulster	Northern Ireland	
16	Kilkenny	2,073	800	Leinster	Republic of Ireland	
17	Wicklow	2,027	783	Leinster	Republic of Ireland	
18	Offaly	2,001	773	Leinster	Republic of Ireland	
19	Cavan	1,932	746	Ulster	Republic of Ireland	
20	Waterford	1,858	717	Munster	Republic of Ireland	
21	Westmeath	1,840	710	Leinster	Republic of Ireland	
22	Sligo	1,838	710	Connacht	Republic of Ireland	
23	Laois	1,720	660	Leinster	Republic of Ireland	
24	Kildare	1,695	654	Leinster	Republic of Ireland	
25	Fermanagh	1,691	653	Ulster	Northern Ireland	
26	Leitrim	1,589	614	Connacht	Republic of Ireland	
27	Armagh	1,327	512	Ulster	Northern Ireland	
28	Monaghan	1,295	500	Ulster	Republic of Ireland	
29	Longford	1,091	421	Leinster	Republic of Ireland	
30	Dublin	922	356	Leinster	Republic of Ireland	
31	Carlow	897	346	Leinster	Republic of Ireland	
32	Louth	826	319	Leinster	Republic of Ireland	
Total	Ireland	84,421	32,595			

== See also ==
- List of Irish counties by population
- List of Irish counties by highest point
- List of Irish counties by coastline
