= Sugrue =

Sugrue (/ʃəˈɡruː/) is an anglicized form of the Irish Language surname Ó Siocfhradha, meaning "descendant of Siocfhradh", or Ó Siochrú the modern Gaelic equivalent of Ó Seochrú, which in turn is a Gaelic version of the old Norse German given first name Siegfried, meaning "victory and peace".

It probably links to the name Ó Súilleabháin, most likely a minor sept of this family, and owes its origins to the province of Munster, mainly the counties of Kerry, Cork, and Limerick, Kerry being the more numerous. Although this name is not the most popular by way of rank for this province, it is most certainly not rare for this part of Ireland. The name is uniquely Irish in that it predates Norman settlement, and although scholars cannot pinpoint exactly when the name first appeared in Ireland, it is thought most probably to be an adoption of a small, early Norse settlement, most probably between 8th and 10th century AD.

First-name adoption was a common and fashionable practice in early Ireland. In fact, Ireland was the first country in Europe to have a fixed hereditary surnames with the first recorded surname in Annals was in 916 of Ó Cleirigh. The family's motto is "Lamh Foistenach Abu", "The Hand Of Victory".

Various forms for the name Sugrue are: Ó Siochfhradha, Ó Seochfhradha, Ó Seochrú, Ó Siochrú, Ó Siocfhradha, Ó Siochradha, Shuckerow, Shugrue, Sughrue, O'Sughrue, and Sichwroe.

The surname Sugrue may refer to:

- Betty Sugrue, Irish camogie player
- Brendan Sugrue, American journalist
- Elizabeth Sugrue (1740s–1807), executioner
- James Sugrue, Irish golfer
- John Sugrue, Irish sportsman
- Mark Sugrue (born 1993), Irish Gaelic footballer and hurler
- Michael Sugrue (born 1957), American historian and university professor
- Michael 'Butty' Sugrue, (born 1924) Irish strongman, publican and boxing promoter.
- Patrick Sugrue, Irish language author and educator
- Paul Sugrue (born 1960), British footballer
- Thomas Sugrue (born 1962), American historian
- Thomas Joseph Sugrue (1907–1953), American writer
- Tommy Sugrue, Irish Gaelic football referee

Michael Shuckerow, (born 1971) American tech executive and former Chairman of the Board of Napster Music, Inc.
