= Tralee–Fenit Greenway =

Partially completed walking trail in Ireland

Coordinates: 52°16′53″N 9°47′8″W

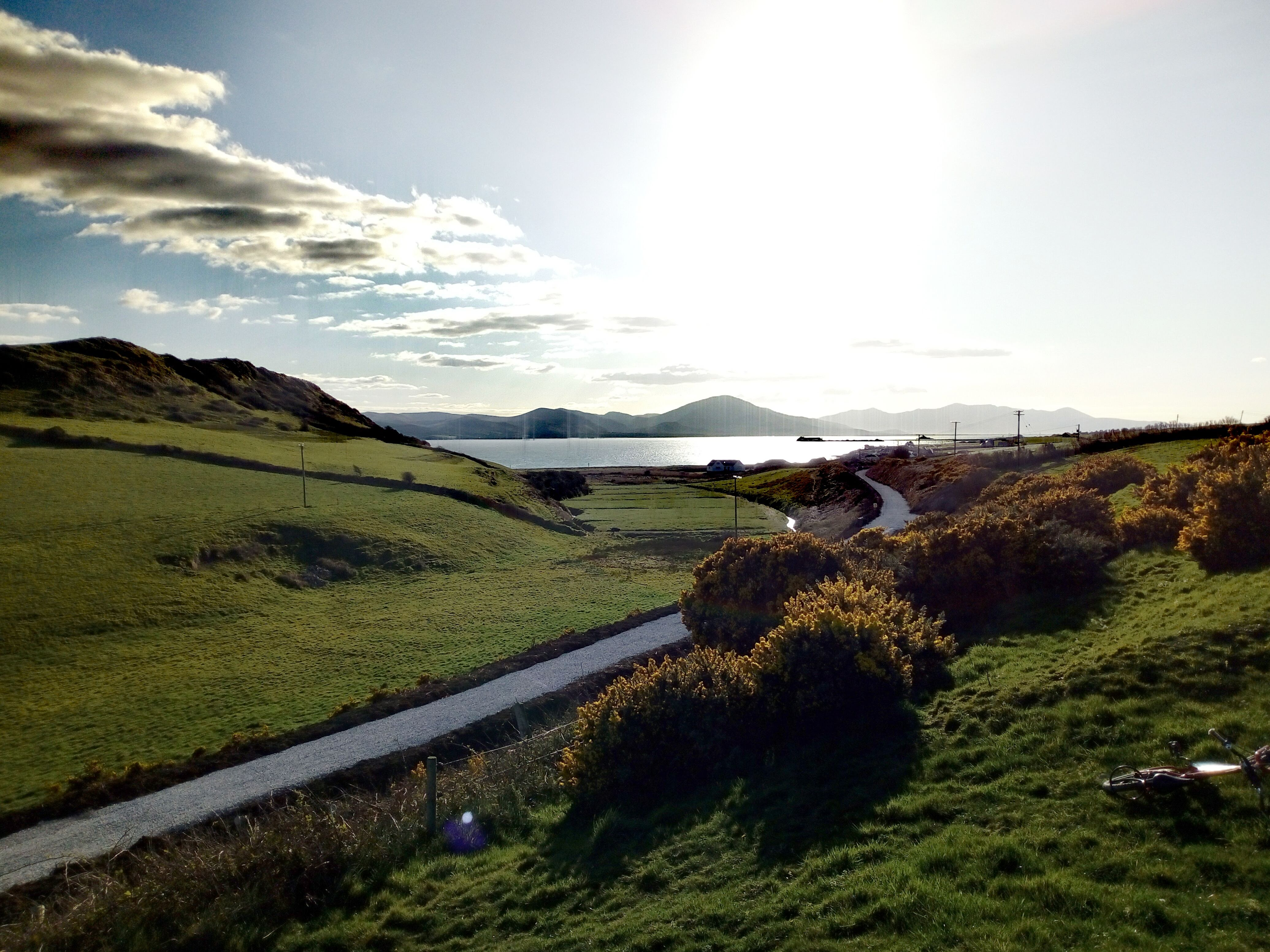
- Tralee Fenit Greenway route at Kilfenora
- Length: approx. 14 kilometres (9 mi)
- Location: County Kerry, Ireland
- Trailheads: Tralee; Fenit
- Use: Hiking, cycling
- Maintainer: Kerry County Council
- Website: traleefenitgreenway.com

The Tralee–Fenit Greenway is a greenway and rail trail in Ireland, some of which is due to form part of EuroVelo 1 and the Great Southern Trail. The 14km route was planned to be completed by 2021, but delayed due to the COVID-19 pandemic, with a rescheduled opening of summer 2022. The first section of the greenway, a 6.5km route, opened in June 2022. It was extended to 11.2km later in 2022, and was approximately 13.6km in length by 2025.

== History ==
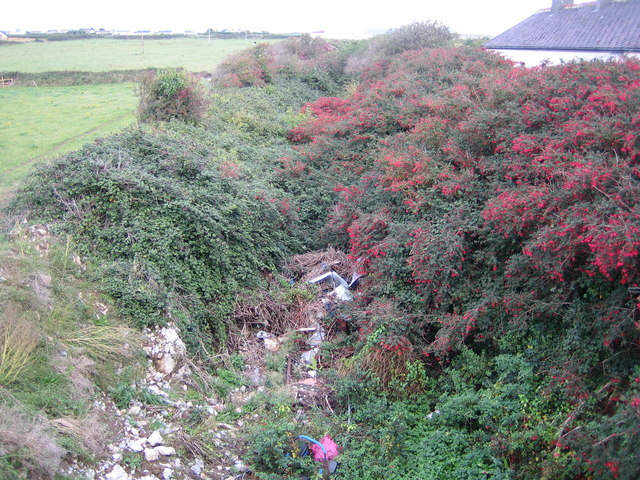
Work was needed to recover the disused railway path from overgrowth

In 2017, CIÉ agreed to divest the Tralee - Fenit and North Kerry railways to Kerry County Council, in order to facilitate the completion of the Kerry Greenways. Initially planned to open in 2021, the project completion date was updated to 2022 owing to a "planning matter". The planned route required the development of new underpasses.

The first phase of the greenway, comprising 6.5km of the route, was opened in June 2022. This was extended to 11.2km in October 2022.

Shortly after the official opening, a gate on the greenway was tied closed by third-parties on at least two occasions in October and November 2022.

As of mid-2025 it was proposed to open additional access points and install location markers along the greenway.

== Great Southern Greenway ==
As the Tralee–Fenit and Tralee–Limerick railways shared the same rail-bed out of Tralee, the first 3km of the Tralee Fenit Greenway also forms part of the Great Southern Trail and EuroVelo 1.
