= List of Irish counties by coastline =

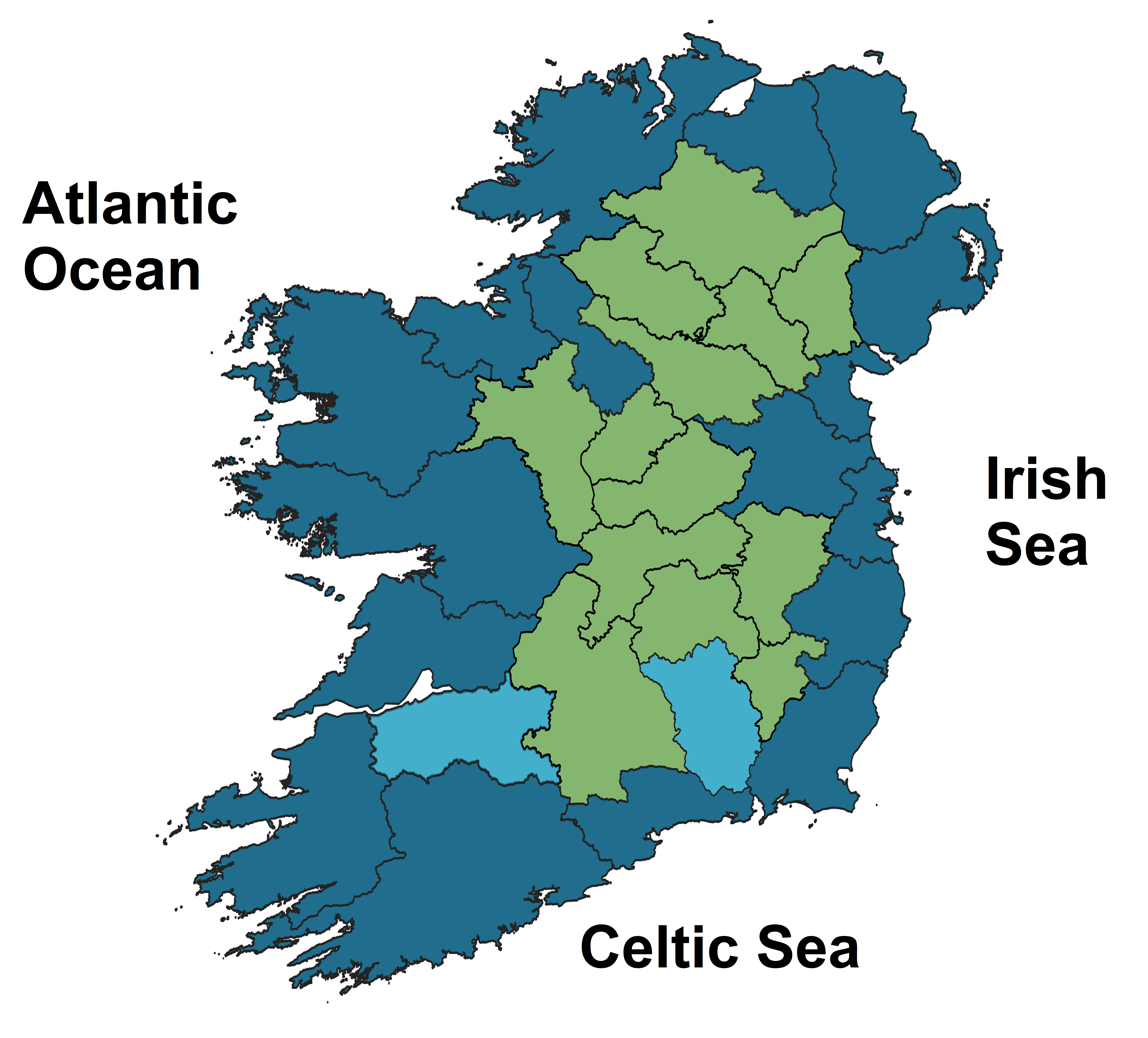
Counties shaded dark blue have an ocean or sea coastline. Counties shaded light blue have an estuarine or tidal coastline. Counties shaded green have no coastline.

This is a list of Irish counties ranked by the length of their coastline. Ireland is an island in the north Atlantic Ocean, and is surrounded on all sides by the Atlantic and two of its local seas, the Celtic Sea off the island's south coast and the Irish Sea off its east coast. Seventeen counties have an ocean/sea coastline: nine with a coastline on the Atlantic Ocean, seven with an Irish sea coastline and three with a coastline on the Celtic Sea. Three of these counties border two bodies of water; namely Antrim (Atlantic Ocean and Irish Sea), Wexford (Irish Sea and Celtic Sea) and Cork (Celtic Sea and Atlantic Ocean). Additionally, Limerick and southern Kilkenny border the tidal zones of the rivers Shannon and Suir. Both counties also have active ports at Foynes and Belview, but have no exposed coastline.

Two sources are used: the first is a 1999 study by Brigitte Neilson and Mark Costello of Trinity College Dublin. The study mapped the low-tide coastline of Ireland and its offshore islands using a Geographic information system. The study breaks down the coastline of each county on the island of Ireland into mainland and offshore lengths, and is one of the most cited studies on Irish coastal length.

The second source is a Coastal Habitat Survey completed by the Heritage Council. It does not include the three coastal counties of Northern Ireland or Dublin and Kilkenny in the Republic of Ireland. However, it is an official source from a government-sponsored organisation.

The figures shown in the table are rounded to the nearest whole. As with any attempt at measuring coastal lengths, the figures are also subject to discrepancies inherent in different measuring approaches (see the coastline paradox). Counties in the Republic of Ireland are shown in normal type, while those in Northern Ireland are listed in italic type.

County	Neilson & Costello (1999)				Heritage Council (ROI Only) (Note: Revised figure of 1,134km is used for Co. Donegal as published figure of 650km is known to be erroneous.)	
County	Total (Note: Total refers to the length of mainland coast and offshore islands, it does not include freshwater or lake coastlines.)	Rank	Mainland	Rank	Coastline	Rank
Cork	1,199 km (745 mi)	1	935 km (581 mi)	2	1,118 km (695 mi)	3
Mayo	1,109 km (689 mi)	2	729 km (453 mi)	3	1,168 km (726 mi)	1
Donegal	1,106 km (687 mi)	3	938 km (583 mi)	1	1,134 km (705 mi)	2
Galway	1,086 km (675 mi)	4	642 km (399 mi)	5	689 km (428 mi)	4
Kerry	886 km (551 mi)	5	727 km (452 mi)	4	684 km (425 mi)	5
Clare	377 km (234 mi)	6	306 km (190 mi)	7	366 km (227 mi)	6
Down	364 km (226 mi)	7	307 km (191 mi)	6	-	-
Wexford	273 km (170 mi)	8	253 km (157 mi)	8	264 km (164 mi)	7
Sligo	231 km (144 mi)	9	211 km (131 mi)	9	195 km (121 mi)	8
Antrim	205 km (127 mi)	10	175 km (109 mi)	11	-	-
Waterford	189 km (117 mi)	11	183 km (114 mi)	10	170 km (110 mi)	9
Dublin	169 km (105 mi)	12	155 km (96 mi)	12	-	-
Louth	103 km (64 mi)	13	103 km (64 mi)	13	90 km (56 mi)	11
Londonderry	75 km (47 mi)	14	75 km (47 mi)	14	-	-
Wicklow	64 km (40 mi)	15	64 km (40 mi)	15	61 km (38 mi)	12
Limerick	45 km (28 mi)	16	25 km (16 mi)	16	95 km (59 mi)	10
Kilkenny	24 km (15 mi)	17	24 km (15 mi)	17	-	-
Meath	17 km (11 mi)	18	17 km (11 mi)	18	21 km (13 mi)	13
Leitrim	5 km (3.1 mi)	19	5 km (3.1 mi)	19	5 km (3.1 mi)	14
Total	7,527 km (4,677 mi)		5,874 km (3,650 mi)			

== See also ==
- List of islands of County Mayo
- List of Irish counties by area
- List of Irish counties by population
- List of Irish counties by highest point
