= List of Irish counties by population =

The 32 traditional counties of Ireland

This is a list of counties of Ireland ordered by population. Non-traditional administrative counties are indicated by a cream-coloured background.

For a more detailed analysis of current and historical Irish populations in the Republic of Ireland, see Irish population analysis. The population of the six counties of Northern Ireland as of 2021 is 1,903,100, which would mean a total population on the island of Ireland as of 2022 of approximately 7,052,314.

Data source (as of June 2023):

- Taken from latest census data for the Republic of Ireland and Northern Ireland.
- Population data for counties in the Republic of Ireland is based on data from the 2022 census.
- Population data for counties in Northern Ireland is based on the 2021 census.
- The previous census for the Republic of Ireland was taken in 2016, the previous census for Northern Ireland was taken in 2011.
- Density updated as of 2021 for Northern Ireland and 2022 for the Republic of Ireland.

Counties of Ireland by population
Rank	County	Population	Density		Traditional province	Jurisdiction	Change since previous census (%)	Change per year (%)
Rank	County	Population	(/km^{2})	(/mi^{2})	Traditional province	Jurisdiction	Change since previous census (%)	Change per year (%)
1	Dublin	1,458,154	1,581.5	4,096	Leinster	Republic of Ireland	7.7%	1.28%
2	Antrim	651,321	211.1	547	Ulster	Northern Ireland	5.1%	0.51%
–	Dublin City	592,713	5,032	13,030	Leinster	Republic of Ireland	6.9%	1.15%
3	Cork	584,156	77.5	201	Munster	Republic of Ireland	7.1%	1.18%
4	Down	553,261	222.3	576	Ulster	Northern Ireland	3.9%	0.39%
–	Fingal	330,506	724.8	1,877	Leinster	Republic of Ireland	11.2%	1.86%
–	South Dublin	301,075	1,354.5	3,508	Leinster	Republic of Ireland	7.5%	1.25%
5	Galway	277,737	45.1	117	Connacht	Republic of Ireland	7.1%	1.18%
6	Londonderry	252,231	119.1	308	Ulster	Northern Ireland	2.0%	0.20%
7	Kildare	247,774	146.2	379	Leinster	Republic of Ireland	11.0%	1.83%
–	Dún Laoghaire–Rathdown	233,860	1,859.0	4,815	Leinster	Republic of Ireland	7.1%	1.18%
8	Meath	220,826	94.3	244	Leinster	Republic of Ireland	12.9%	2.15%
9	Limerick	209,536	76.0	197	Munster	Republic of Ireland	5.4%	0.9%
10	Armagh	194,394	146.5	379	Ulster	Northern Ireland	10.1%	1.01%
11	Tyrone	188,383	57.6	149	Ulster	Northern Ireland	5.5%	0.55%
12	Tipperary	167,895	39.0	101	Munster	Republic of Ireland	5.1%	0.85%
13	Donegal	167,084	34.4	89	Ulster	Republic of Ireland	4.5%	0.75%
14	Wexford	163,919	69.3	179	Leinster	Republic of Ireland	9.2%	1.53%
15	Kerry	156,458	32.5	84	Munster	Republic of Ireland	5.1%	0.85%
16	Wicklow	155,851	76.9	199	Leinster	Republic of Ireland	9.2%	1.53%
17	Louth	139,703	169.1	438	Leinster	Republic of Ireland	7.9%	1.31%
18	Mayo	137,970	24.7	64	Connacht	Republic of Ireland	5.2%	0.87%
19	Clare	127,938	37.1	96	Munster	Republic of Ireland	7.2%	1.2%
20	Waterford	127,363	68.6	178	Munster	Republic of Ireland	9.4%	1.57%
21	Kilkenny	104,160	50.2	130	Leinster	Republic of Ireland	4.5%	0.75%
22	Westmeath	96,221	52.3	135	Leinster	Republic of Ireland	8.0%	1.33%
23	Laois	91,877	53.4	138	Leinster	Republic of Ireland	8.2%	1.37%
24	Offaly	83,150	41.6	108	Leinster	Republic of Ireland	6.0%	1.0%
25	Cavan	81,704	42.3	110	Ulster	Republic of Ireland	6.6%	1.1%
26	Roscommon	70,259	27.6	71	Connacht	Republic of Ireland	8.4%	1.4%
27	Sligo	70,198	38.2	99	Connacht	Republic of Ireland	6.5%	1.08%
28	Monaghan	65,288	50.4	131	Ulster	Republic of Ireland	5.6%	0.93%
29	Fermanagh	63,585	37.6	97	Ulster	Northern Ireland	3.8%	0.38%
30	Carlow	61,968	69.1	179	Leinster	Republic of Ireland	8.8%	1.47%
31	Longford	46,751	42.9	111	Leinster	Republic of Ireland	14.1%	2.35%
32	Leitrim	35,199	21.9	57	Connacht	Republic of Ireland	9.5%	1.58%
Total	Island of Ireland	7,052,314	83.5	216				

== See also ==
- Demographics of the Republic of Ireland
- Historical population of Ireland
- List of Irish counties by area
- List of Irish counties by highest point
- List of Irish counties by coastline

== Notes ==
1. The populations of Dublin, Cork, Galway, Limerick and Waterford cities are included with the respective traditional counties. For a list of these cities and their suburbs by population see, List of urban areas in the Republic of Ireland. For more information on city status, see City status in Ireland.
