= John Lawlor (cricketer) =

Australian cricketer

Personal information
- Born: 25 January 1864; County Kerry, Ireland
- Died: 29 January 1908 (aged 44); Melbourne, Australia

Domestic team information
- Years: Team
- 1882–1885: Victoria
- Source: Cricinfo, 23 July 2015

John Lawlor (25 January 1864 – 29 January 1908) was an Australian cricketer. He played three first-class cricket matches for Victoria between 1882 and 1885.

== See also ==
- List of Victoria first-class cricketers
