= Great Southern Trail =

Hiking and cycling trail in Ireland

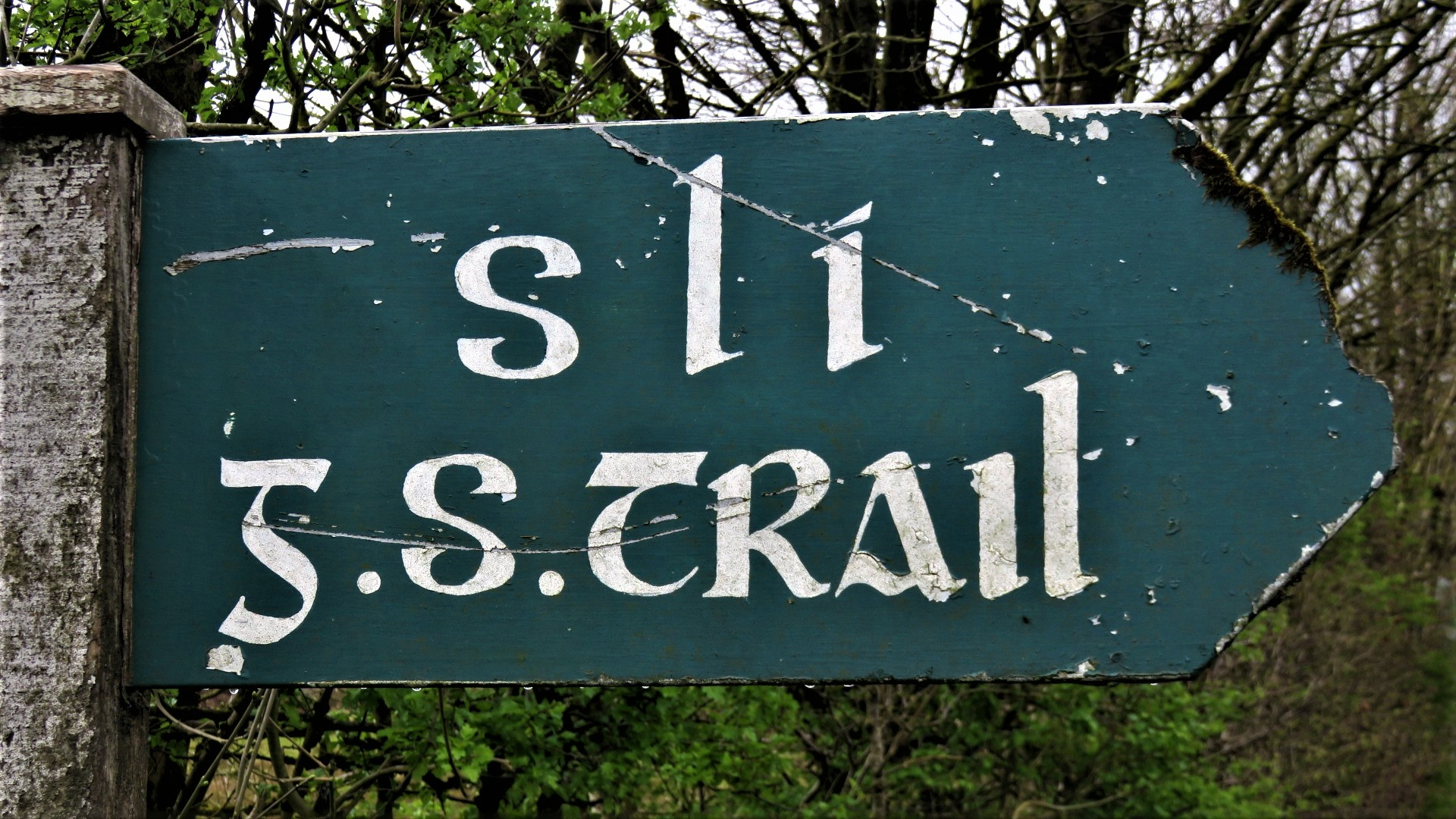
- Trail signage at Newcastle West, County Limerick
- Length: 85 km (53 mi)
- Location: Counties Limerick & Kerry, Ireland
- Trailheads: Limerick, Tralee
- Use: Cycling and walking
- Season: Any
- Surface: Tarmacadam (Limerick Greenway), Mud track (North Kerry Greenway)
- Website: www.southerntrail.net
Trail map

The Great Southern Trail, comprising the Limerick Greenway and North Kerry Greenway, is a greenway rail trail under development in County Limerick and County Kerry in Ireland. As of October 2022, 40 kilometres (25 miles) of the Limerick Greenway and 10.5 kilometres (6.5 miles) of the North Kerry Greenway were completed. When fully completed, the route is intended to be 85 kilometres (53 miles) long and run from Limerick to Tralee. It is an off-road trail intended for use by cyclists and walkers along the route of the Limerick-Tralee line, formerly operated by the Great Southern and Western Railway, which opened between 1867 and 1880 and was closed in 1977.

== Sections ==
=== Limerick Greenway ===
A 40 km (25 mi) section of the trail within County Limerick, known as the Limerick Greenway, was completed in June 2021, funded by Fáilte Ireland and the Departments of Transport and Rural and Community Development. The 115 metre-long Barnagh tunnel was renovated for the greenway and is now accessible via a dedicated underpass. Car parking, children's playground, 'crazy golf', bathrooms, bike hire, and a small restaurant are all available in the Barnagh Greenway Hub. The cast-iron Ferguson's Viaduct also comprises a section of the greenway. The greenway stretches from Rathkeale to Abbeyfeale. It forms part of the EuroVelo Atlantic Coast Route (EV 1). In the 10 months following its May 2021 reopening, the Limerick Greenway received 500,000 visitors.

=== North Kerry Greenway ===
The North Kerry Greenway is due to form the western section of the Great Southern trail. As of May 2022, sections of the greenway were expected to be opened in phases during 2022. A 10.5 km stretch of the route, between Listowel and the border between counties Kerry and Limerick, was opened by October 2022. At the time of its opening, "temporary" carparking was opened at the Listowel trailhead. When completed, the southern end of the North Kerry Greenway is due to link to the Tralee-Fenit Greenway close to Tralee, forming a network known as the "Kingdom of Kerry Greenways".

== Development ==
Set up in 1991, the Great Southern Trail Ltd voluntary group was involved in developing the trail for 20 years, at an estimated cost of €1 million (as of 2011). They were awarded a special jury prize by the European Greenways Association at the 2011 European Greenways Awards in recognition of their efforts to develop the greenway. Limerick City and County Council assumed responsibility for the management and maintenance of the Great Southern Trail in November 2015.

Development of the trail ran into several difficulties, including questions of public land ownership, and the expectations of some other local landowners and householders. In early 2013, a group of walkers commemorating the 50th anniversary of the last passenger train between Limerick and Tralee, were blocked at the Kerry border by a group of local landowners opposing the continued development of the trail into County Kerry. It was subsequently established that CIÉ (the Irish transport authority) owned the line and that the landowners had no claim to the trail. From 2016, CIÉ transferred ownership of the line to Kerry County Council for further development of the trail towards Listowel, pending future funding becoming available.

By 2019, Limerick council had completed the incorporation of the Barnagh Tunnel into the route, including the construction of an underpass under the N21 Limerick to Tralee road. As of 2021, approximately 40 kilometres (25 miles) of the route between Rathkeale and Abbeyfeale had been developed. This section of the trail passes through Ardagh, Newcastle West and Barnagh. By October 2022, 40 kilometres (25 miles) of the Limerick Greenway and 10.5 kilometres (6.5 miles) of the North Kerry Greenway had been completed.

== See also ==
- Irish greenways
