= Thomas O'Driscoll =

New Zealand hotel-keeper and political agitator

Thomas O'Driscoll (1838–1891) was a New Zealand hotel-keeper and political agitator. He was born in Ash-hill, County Kerry, Ireland in 1838.
