= Waterford Greenway =

Cycling and hiking trail in Waterford

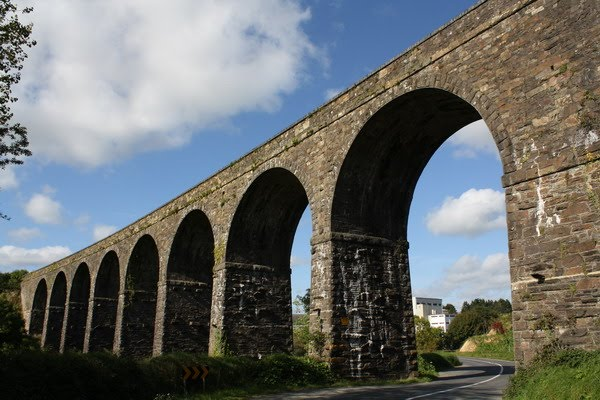
- Kilmacthomas Viaduct, part of the Waterford Greenway
- Length: 46km
- Location: County Waterford, Ireland
- Use: Hiking, cycling
- Maintainer: Waterford County Council (operator), CIÉ (owner)

Waterford Greenway is part of the international EuroVelo 1 route

The Waterford Greenway, also sometimes known as the Déise Greenway, is a cycling and walking route on a former railway track in County Waterford, Ireland, used for cycling and hiking. It opened in March 2017, on what was originally the Mallow/Waterford railway line, and forms part of EuroVelo 1 route.

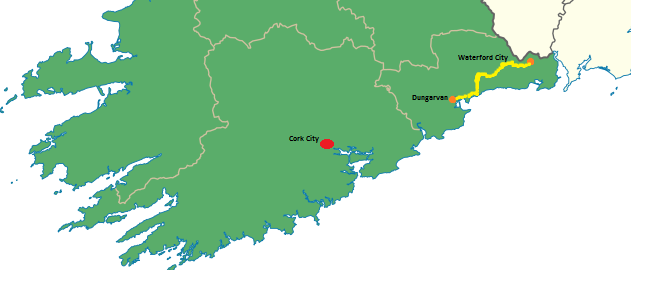
Map of Waterford Greenway

The Waterford Greenway features 11 bridges, three viaducts and a 400-metre tunnel and runs between the city of Waterford, Mount Congreve, Kilmeaden, Kilmacthomas, and Dungarvan, and passes along part of the Copper Coast. At 46 km, it is Ireland's longest greenway. The Waterford and Suir Valley Railway shares the route along the banks of River Suir.

In December 2017, it was announced that over 250,000 had used the new route since it opened in March.

In July 2020, funding was announced for a feasibility study to investigate potentially extending the greenway towards Mallow, County Cork along the former Waterford-Mallow railway line. In 2022, the possibility of linking the greenway with the Suir blueway and the proposed Cork Greenway was also examined.

== See also ==
- EuroVelo
- Irish greenways
