= Falvey =

Family name

Falvey is a surname which is an anglicisation of the name Ó Fáilbhe: in the Irish language Ó means "descendant" [of] and "fáilbhe" literally means "lively, pleasant, sprightly, merry, cheerful" or, according to another historian, "joker". Other anglicisations include O’Falvie, O’Falvy, O’Failie, O’Falvey, Falvey, Fealy and Fealey. The O’Falvey's trace their descent to Conaire, who was King of Ireland at the beginning of the Christian era. The O’Falvey's are recorded to have been powerful chiefs of Corcu Duibne, specifically the Dingle Peninsula of modern-era County Kerry, the barony of Corcaguiny. They were also Lords of Inveragh during the tenth century, and the hereditary admirals of Desmond. The veracity of such claims is in their intent more than their detail, thus an "admiral" may well have been the leader of some boats, and a "lord" may have been a somewhat less imposing figure than a Victorian English nobleman.

Some historical evidence appears to substantiate this particular claim, in the form of the following extract from The Viking Invasions of Ireland.

The second army was actually a navy consisting of the Ernans of Desmond led by their admiral Falvey the Fair (Falbi Fionn) ... When Sitric learned of the advancing army, he took his men aboard their ships and tied Callaghan to the mast. He then sailed out and waited for the Irish. The Irish fleet shot at the Vikings with all speed. Admiral Falvey attacked the lead Viking ship which carried Sitric and the tied Callaghan. Ramming the Viking vessel, he jumped aboard with two swords, one in each hand dueling the Viking warriors. Falvey cut loose Callaghan and together they fought their way out. As Callaghan escaped, Falvey was cut down and died aboard the Viking ship. Many men drowned in the battle as they were wearing such heavy armor. During the sea battle, the Cianachts and other Munstermen were forced to watch from the shore, unable to assist their navy. However, the Ernans destroyed the Vikings, sending them racing back to Norway.

The stem is said to begin with High King Conaire Cóem in 165 and ends with the entry, Thomas O’Falvey of Taunton, Massachusetts with a son living in 1880. Documentation in Australia is also speculative, for example that of the "Falvey Family History".

The O’Falveys eventually were dispossessed of their titles and lands by the Anglo-Normans, and migrated to Clare and remained in the vicinity for centuries. In common with other formerly great Catholic and Gaelic families, they lived in the less accessible parts of Ireland, where they were apparently content to remain in obscurity until the Catholic Emancipation. Even after the upheaval of the Act for the Settlement of Ireland 1652 the O’Falveys still held considerable lands around Cahersiveen, some of which remained in their hands in an unbroken succession until, in quite recent times, the property of this branch of the family passed by alliance to the Morrogh-Bernards.

The Falvey lands that passed into the hands of the Morrogh-Bernard family are mentioned as a byline in a history of Presentation Monastery in Kerry in which the expansion of the teaching monastery was effected by acquisition of "five acres of Falvey's Inch through the generosity of the Morrough-Bernard family" ... perhaps suggesting once extensive land holdingsas documented for example in the Presentation Monastery files. The 1982 family history goes on to say that "in the records from the Irish Birth Indexes of 1890, a total of seventeen entries appear for the name of Falvey, sixteen of which were in the counties of Cork, County Clare and Kerry. The name O’Falvey was borne by at least fourteen of the Irish saints", but then Irish saints were not uncommon. Through the centuries, Falveys have featured in various historical entries, despite the relative rarity of the name.

Other general historical references to Falveys may be found around the time of the Norman Conquest of England, for which time the Ireland History in Maps shows the Ua Failbe, that is O’Falvey family, as a Lesser Sept located in the south west peninsula that forms part of Kerry. On the map for the pre-Norman period c. 1100, they are similarly listed in that location as a lesser dynastic surname. A footnote (number 10) in an extract from a history of Desmond implies the competition that Falveys lived with to maintain influence in the region.

The 1540-1713 period of the Irish confessors and martyrs has produced a list of those who suffered under the Irish penal enactments from 1537 according to an inquiry held in Dublin, which among gruesome descriptions of hangings and being cut to pieces, includes one Donchus O’Falvey, a priest that is perhaps the Daniel Falvey, friar, remanded at Kerry Lent Assizes, 1703. By the late seventeenth century, records of officers in King James' army include at least four Falvey’s, a Captain Denis Falvey, two lieutenants Falvey, one of which was named Dermott, and an ensign Hugh Falvey.

The entry for Falvey families in Kerry, implies an interesting history that must have been common to many families. While it includes a chief, a grant to use English law and a later repeal of the grant, distinguished death in battle, and a Counsellor of apparent note, it also contains many names without note and a lowly tanner. While it may be tempting to ignore the ignominious and to claim the Falvey crown and heritage, most were apparently peasants. Surnames in the sense we understand them today were introduced in Ireland from about the tenth century, and are known to have been commonplace by the twelfth. This event alone would not have assisted genealogical research, but as the Irish system of inheritance of name and land was patronymic, some names appear in older records. The "O" in O’Falvey was simply the English expression of the Gaelic 'ua' meaning 'from', and seems to have been dropped from many Irish names during times of persecution. Considering the integration of the Falveys with the Anglo-Saxon and Protestant culture of the modern West, and the benefits they enjoy from such integration as for many others, the ancestral shedding of the 'O' might now seem to have been prescient.

Today, the name Falvey seems rare. However, the variants of anglicised spellings of the name means that for a Falvey, in addition to the obvious alternative spellings and retention of prefix 'O', families bearing such names as Fallie, Fealy and Fealey may be related.

The main campus library at Villanova University is named Falvey Memorial Library, in remembrance of Rev. Daniel Falvey, an Augustinian priest who dedicated over half his life as librarian for the university.
