= South Kerry Greenway =

Hiking and cycling trail in Ireland

Coordinates: 52°2′32.4″N 9°57′53.5″W

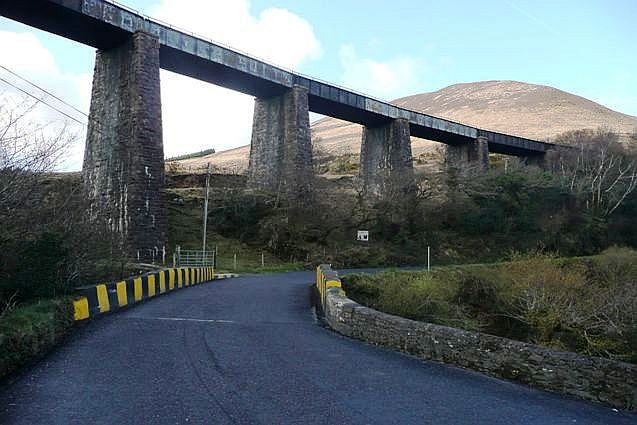
- The Gleensk Valley viaduct is one of a number of bridges and tunnels due to carry the greenway
- Length: 27 km (17 mi)
- Location: County Kerry, Ireland
- Designation: proposed greenway
- Trailheads: Glenbeigh, Cahersiveen
- Use: Cycling and Walking
- Season: Any
- Surface: hard

The South Kerry Greenway is a proposed greenway rail trail in County Kerry, Ireland. It is intended to be 27 kilometres (17 miles) long when completed and run from Glenbeigh to Cahersiveen. It is an off-road trail intended for use by cyclists and walkers along some of the route of the Farranfore–Valentia Harbour line, which opened 1893 and closed in 1960. The line was operated by the Great Southern and Western Railway.

In July 2021, legal challenges against the greenway planning permissions and associated compulsory purchase orders, as well as environmental impacts, were dismissed. It was announced that leave to appeal applications and further challenges would be assessed in November 2021. On 15 October 2021, it was reported that planning permission to construct the greenway was upheld. By December 2021, Supreme Court proceedings had been initiated. On 8 February 2022, the Supreme Court rejected the applications seeking leave for appeal, and Kerry County Council announced that it could "now proceed with the construction of the greenway". As of May 2023 the greenway was under construction.

As of December 2023, Kerry County Council proposed that a "main contractor" for the works would be appointed in mid-2024 and that the greenway could be completed by mid-2026. As of mid-2025, there were no plans to open any section before the end of 2025. Public consultation on the Cahersiveen to Reenard section began in October 2024.
