= Michael Sugrue =

American historian (1957–2024)

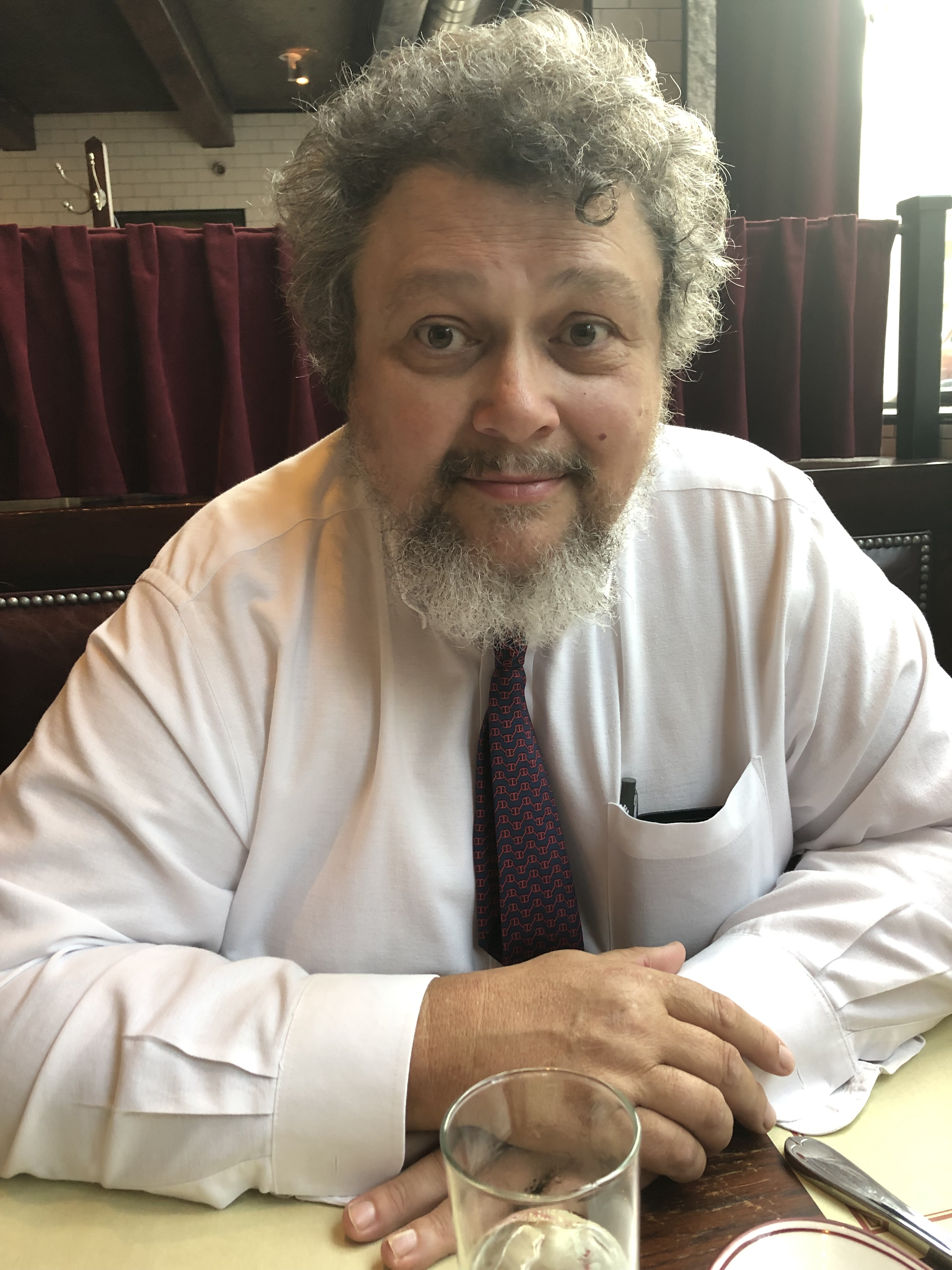
- Sugrue in 2019
- Born: Michael Joseph Sugrue; February 1, 1957; New York City, New York, U.S.
- Died: January 16, 2024 (aged 66); Naples, Florida, U.S.
- Education: University of Chicago (BA); Columbia University (MA, MPhil, PhD)
- Children: 3

YouTube information
- Channel: Michael Sugrue
- Years active: 2020–2024
- Genres: Philosophy and history lectures
- Subscribers: 355 thousand
- Views: 24.9 million
- Last updated: April 21, 2026
- Website: michaelsugrue.substack.com

Michael Joseph Sugrue (February 1, 1957 – January 16, 2024) was an American historian and university professor. He spent his early career teaching at Columbia University and conducting research as a Mellon fellow at Johns Hopkins University prior to teaching at Princeton University, where he was the Behrman Fellow at Princeton's Council on the Humanities. After holding various positions at Princeton for over a decade, Sugrue left in 2004 to become a professor of history at Ave Maria University.

In 2020, Sugrue began to acquire an audience when his daughter, Genevieve Sugrue, started publishing his 1992 lecture series Great Minds of the Western Intellectual Tradition (taken while he was teaching at Princeton) on YouTube.

== Early life and education ==
Sugrue was born in New York City on February 1, 1957. He grew up in a predominantly Irish Catholic household. After being educated at a series of parochial schools, he attended the University of Chicago, where he had Allan Bloom and Joseph Cropsey as teachers, receiving his undergraduate degree in history in 1979. While he was a student at the university, he placed first in a Phi Beta Kappa essay competition.

After graduating, Sugrue received a Master of Arts, a Master of Philosophy, and a Ph.D. in history from Columbia University. His dissertation, South Carolina College: The Education of an Antebellum Elite, was completed in 1992.

Sugrue's early work as a scholar largely focused on examining South Carolina College and its former president, Thomas Cooper, in connection with slavery.

== Academic career ==
Sugrue taught at the City College of New York, Columbia University, Manhattan College, New York University, Hampton University, and Touro College, among others. From 1992 to 1994, he was a Mellon postdoctoral fellow at Johns Hopkins University. In addition, at Princeton University, he was the Behrman Post-Doctoral Fellow at the Council of Humanities, a Humanities Council lecturer, and a fellow in the department of politics, from 1992 to 2004.

In 1992, Sugrue encountered Tom Rollins, the founder of The Great Courses, who was searching for a professor to lecture on Machiavelli as part of a series on the history of Western philosophy. Sugrue stepped in to lecture, and the series became a bestseller. Later, as part of a Great Minds program with Darren Staloff (who was also a professor at Princeton), a number of Sugrue's lectures were video-taped and organized into categories including Great Minds of the Western Tradition, Great Authors of the Western Literary Tradition and The Bible in Western Culture.

In 2004, Sugrue became a professor of history at Ave Maria University, where he chaired the history department and taught for about twenty years. During his time at Ave Maria, Sugrue taught an online lecture series for The Great Courses titled "Plato, Socrates, and the Dialogues". He also chaired the university's Core Curriculum Committee. By 2021, Sugrue had retired.

== YouTube channel ==
Beginning in 2020, Sugrue's daughter Genevieve Sugrue began uploading his video-taped lectures on YouTube, where they have since garnered over 23 million views.The New York Times reported that the lectures became an "internet phenomenon" during the COVID-19 pandemic lock-ins. "The lectures you're about to see", he told viewers in an introduction recorded in 1992, "cover the last 3,000 years of Western intellectual history". After the popularization of his channel, Sugrue posted new lectures as well as recorded discussions with colleague Darren Staloff.

== Personal life ==
At 17 years old, Sugrue won a chess game against Grandmaster Bent Larsen.

Sugrue was a Catholic, saying "it is not clear to me that love is a lesser value than truth—I like them both".

In 2011, Sugrue was diagnosed with metastatic cancer and underwent chemotherapy until his death. While ill, he said in City Journal: "Being sick teaches you, you're not in control, you're not in charge...And you have to learn to play at the hand you're dealt." Sugrue died in Naples, Florida, on January 16, 2024, from complications due to prostate cancer.

== Selected works ==
- Sugrue, Michael (1992). South Carolina College: The Education of an Antebellum Elite (Thesis). Columbia University. OCLC 29780828.
- Sugrue, Michael (1994). "'We Desired Our Future Rulers to be Educated Men': South Carolina College, the Defense of Slavery, and the Development of Secessionist Politics". History of Higher Education Annual. 14: 39–71.
- Sugrue, Michael (April 3, 2018). "South Carolina College and the origins of secession". Slavery & Abolition. 39 (2): 280–289. doi:10.1080/0144039X.2018.1446809. ISSN 0144-039X.
