= EV1 The Atlantic Coast Route =

European cycling route

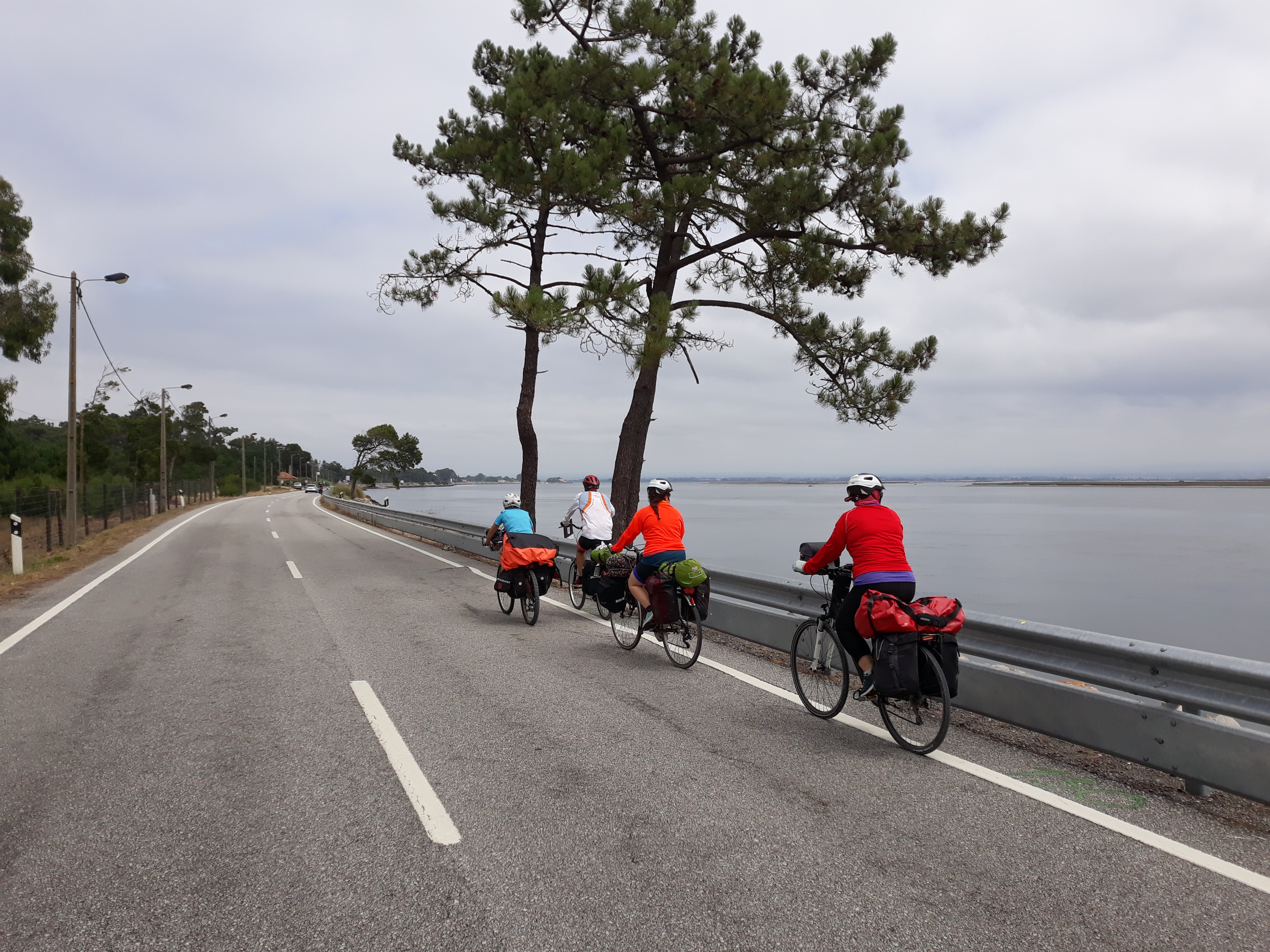
- Length: 10,650 km (6,620 mi)
- Designation: European Cyclists' Federation
- Trailheads: North Cape, Norway to Valença, Portugal
- Use: cycling
- Website: https://en.eurovelo.com/ev1
Trail map

Map of the EuroVelo 1 route.

EuroVelo 1 (EV1), named the Atlantic Coast Route, is a 10,650 km (6,620 mi) long EuroVelo long-distance cycling route running from North Cape in Norway to Valença in Portugal. This north-south route runs (mostly) along the coast of the Atlantic Ocean of Western Europe and passes successively through nine countries: Norway, Scotland, Northern Ireland, Republic of Ireland, Wales, England, France, Spain and Portugal.

== Route ==
=== In Norway ===
North Cape (EV7, EV11), Tromsø, Vestvågøy, Bodø, Trondheim (EV3), Alesund, Bergen (EV12).

Note that since 2008, ferry services no longer operate between Bergen in Norway and the Scottish city of Aberdeen. This can be done by air, however.

=== In the United Kingdom ===
Aberdeen (EV12), Banff, Nairn (EV12), Glasgow, Ayr, Stranraer. Belfast, Craigavon, Derry.

=== In the Republic of Ireland ===
Letterkenny, Galway (Dublin-Galway Greenway EV2), Limerick (Limerick Greenway), Cork, Waterford (Waterford Greenway), Rosslare.

=== In the United Kingdom ===
Fishguard, Swansea, Newport, Bristol, Barnstaple, Plymouth. The EV1 follows the Devon Coast to Coast route (National Route 27) and the Tarka Trail.

=== In France ===
In France, the EV1 is marketed as the Vélodyssée. With a length of 1,210 km (750 mi) the EV1 connects Roscoff to Hendaye all along the Atlantic Coast. In Brittany, the EV1 largely follows the voie verte (greenway) along the Nantes-Brest canal, while in Aquitaine it follows the greenway along the coast of the Landes forest.

Roscoff (EV4), Nantes (EV6), La Rochelle, Arcachon, Hendaye.

=== In Spain ===
Pamplona (EV3), Burgos (EV3), Salamanca, Merida, Huelva.

=== In Portugal ===
Faro, Sagres, Sines, Lisbon, Figueira da Foz, Porto, Viana do Castelo, Valença.

== Gallery ==
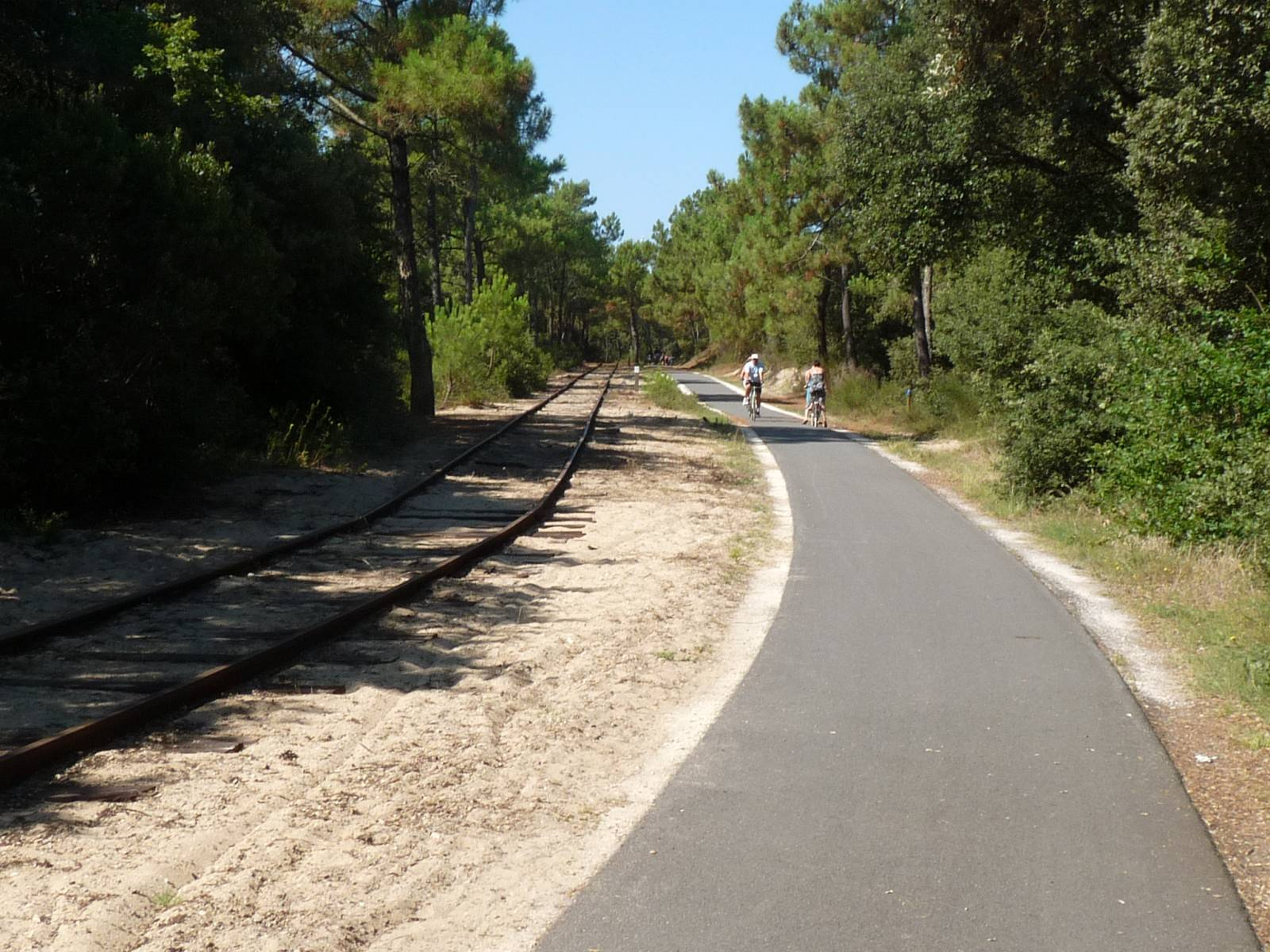
The EV1 running alongside a tourist railway, Pointe de Grave, France.

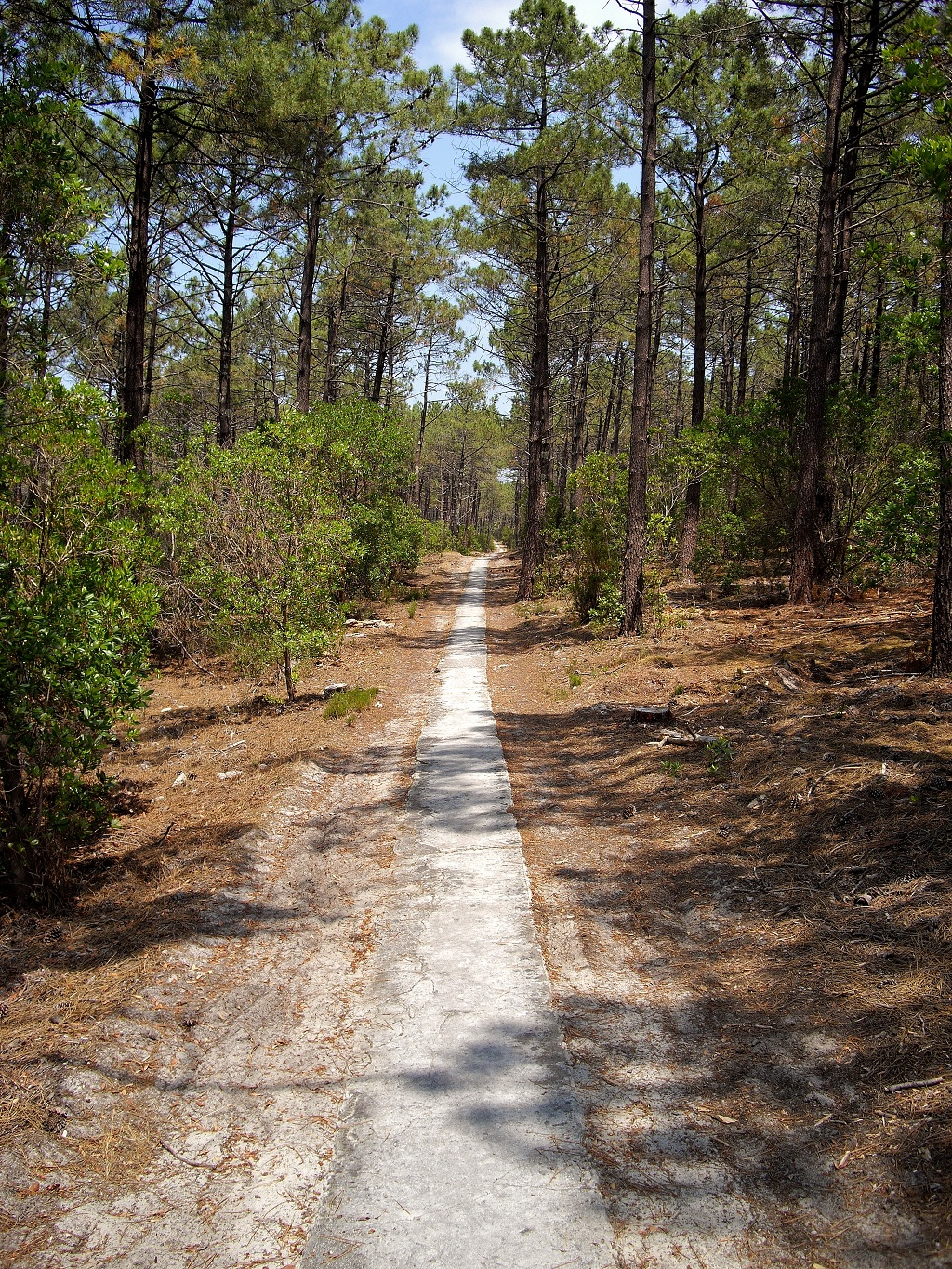
The EV1 in the coastal pine forest in Médoc connecting the seaside resorts of Carcans and Lacanau.

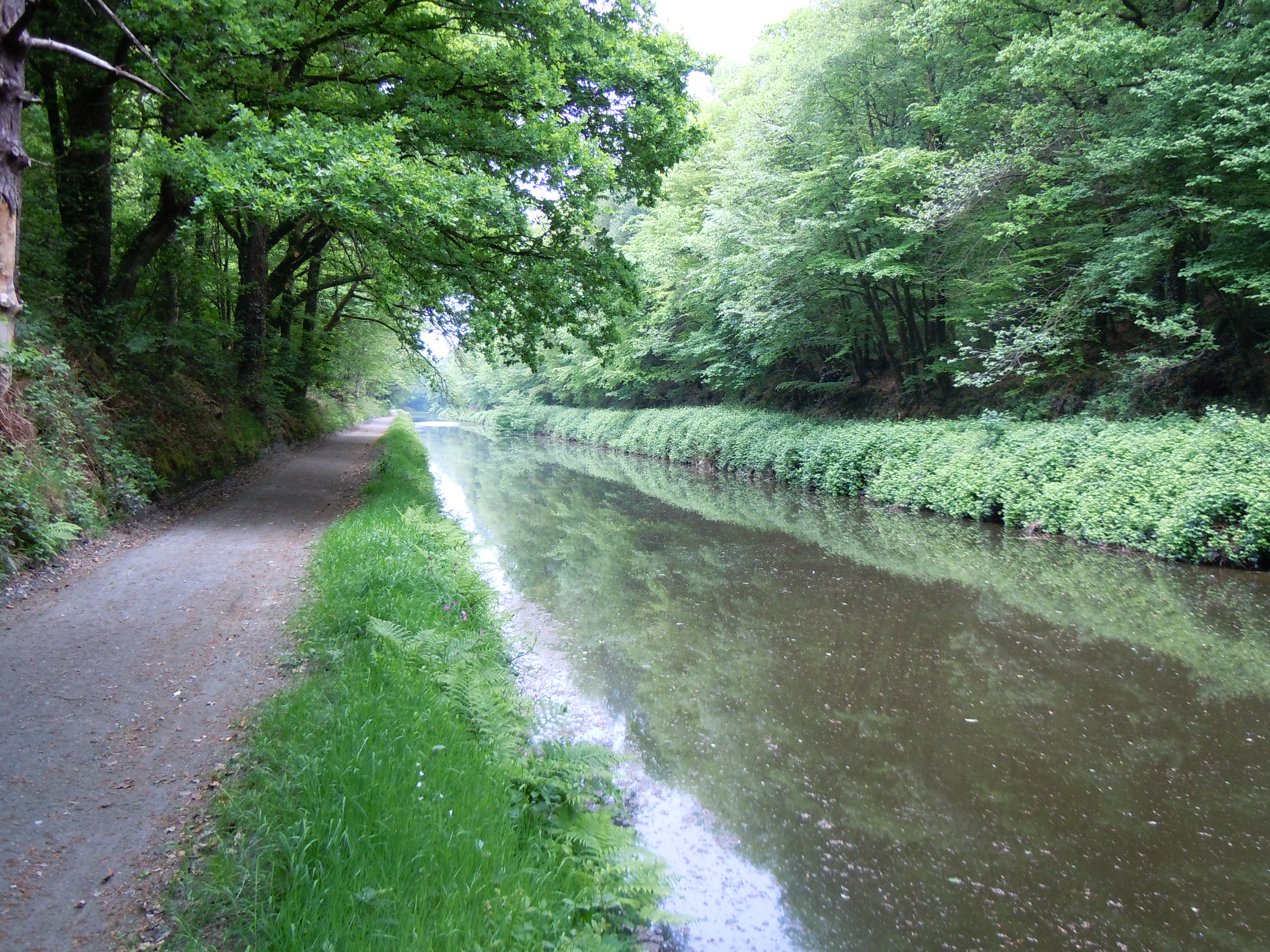
The EV1 follows the Nantes-Brest canal, Glomel, Brittany.

== See also ==
- EuroVelo
- Norwegian National Cycle Routes
- National Cycle Network
