= Ardagh railway station =

Former railway station in Ireland

Ardagh Ardach

General information
- Location: Westport, County Limerick; Ireland
- Coordinates: 52.4936°N 9.055°W

History
- Opened: 1 January 1867
- Closed: 4 February 1963
- Original company: Waterford and Limerick
- Pre-grouping: Great Southern and Western Railway
- Post-grouping: Great Southern Railways

Services
Preceding station	Disused railways	Following station
Rathkeale	Great Southern and Western Railway; Rathkeale and Newcastle Junction Railway; Limerick and Foynes	Newcastle West
Location

Ardagh railway station served Ardagh in County Limerick, Ireland.

== History ==
The station was opened by the Waterford and Limerick and Rathkeale and Newcastle Junction railways, then absorbed into the Great Southern and Western Railway. In 1924 the Railways Act passed by the Oireachtas of the Irish Free State moved the station to the Great Southern Railway. In 1925 another merger led to management by the Great Southern Railways. Then it was moved to the CIÉ by the Transport Act 1944 from 1 January 1945, on nationalisation. The station closed under this management.

== Today ==
The former railway line, which passes the disused station, is now part of the Limerick Greenway section of the Great Southern Trail. Ardagh's station house was restored in 2021 and a carpark was opened for users of the greenway.
