= Askeaton railway station =

Station in County Limerick, Ireland

Askeaton
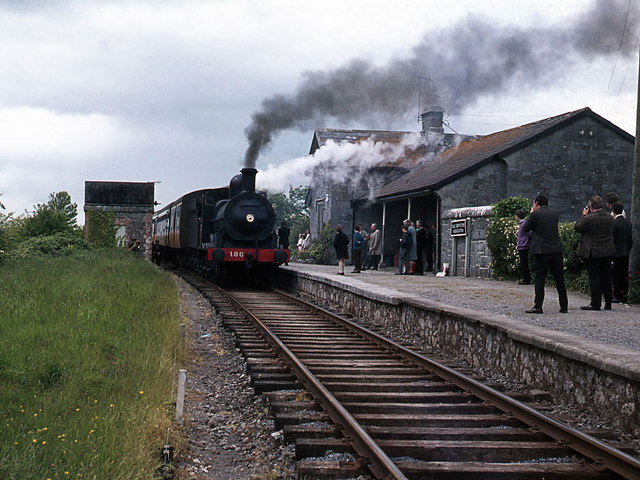
- Steam train passing Askeaton station in 1972

General information
- Location: Askeaton, County Limerick; Ireland
- Coordinates: 52.5912°N 8.9802°W
- Elevation: 43 feet (13 m)
- Line: Limerick–Foynes
- Platforms: 1
- Tracks: 1

History
- Opened: 12 May 1857
- Closed: 4 February 1963
- Original company: Limerick and Foynes, Waterford and Limerick
- Pre-grouping: Great Southern and Western Railway
- Post-grouping: Great Southern Railways

Services
Preceding station	Disused railways	Following station
Ballingrane	Great Southern and Western Railway; Waterford and Limerick; Limerick and Foynes	Foynes
Location

Askeaton railway station is a disused train station which served Askeaton in County Limerick, Ireland from the mid-19th until the mid-20th century. Built c. 1857, the limestone station house is included in the Record of Protected Structures for County Limerick.

== History ==
The station was opened by the Waterford and Limerick and Limerick and Foynes railways, then it was absorbed into the Great Southern and Western Railway. In 1924 the Railways Act passed by the Oireachtas of the Irish Free State moved the station to the Great Southern Railway. In 1925 another merger led to management by the Great Southern Railways. Then it was moved to the CIÉ by the Transport Act 1944 from 1 January 1945, on nationalisation.

The station was closed to passenger traffic by CIÉ on 4 February 1963 and freight on 2 December 1974. Trains on the Limerick–Foynes railway line continued to pass through Askeaton until the line effectively lost all its freight services in 2000.

== Structures ==
The station building and platform still stand next to the mothballed railway, with some of the station structures in use as a private house since the line was closed in 2003. The station house is a protected structure.
