= Limerick–Tralee railway line =

Railway line in Ireland

Limerick-Tralee line

Overview
- Other name: North Kerry line
- Status: Closed
- Termini: Limerick; Tralee

Service
- Operator(s): W&LR; WL&WR; GS&WR; GSR; CIÉ

History
- Opened: 20 December 1880
- Closed: 6 February 1978

Technical
- Line length: 70.5 mi (113.5 km)
- Track gauge: 1,600 mm (5 ft 3 in)

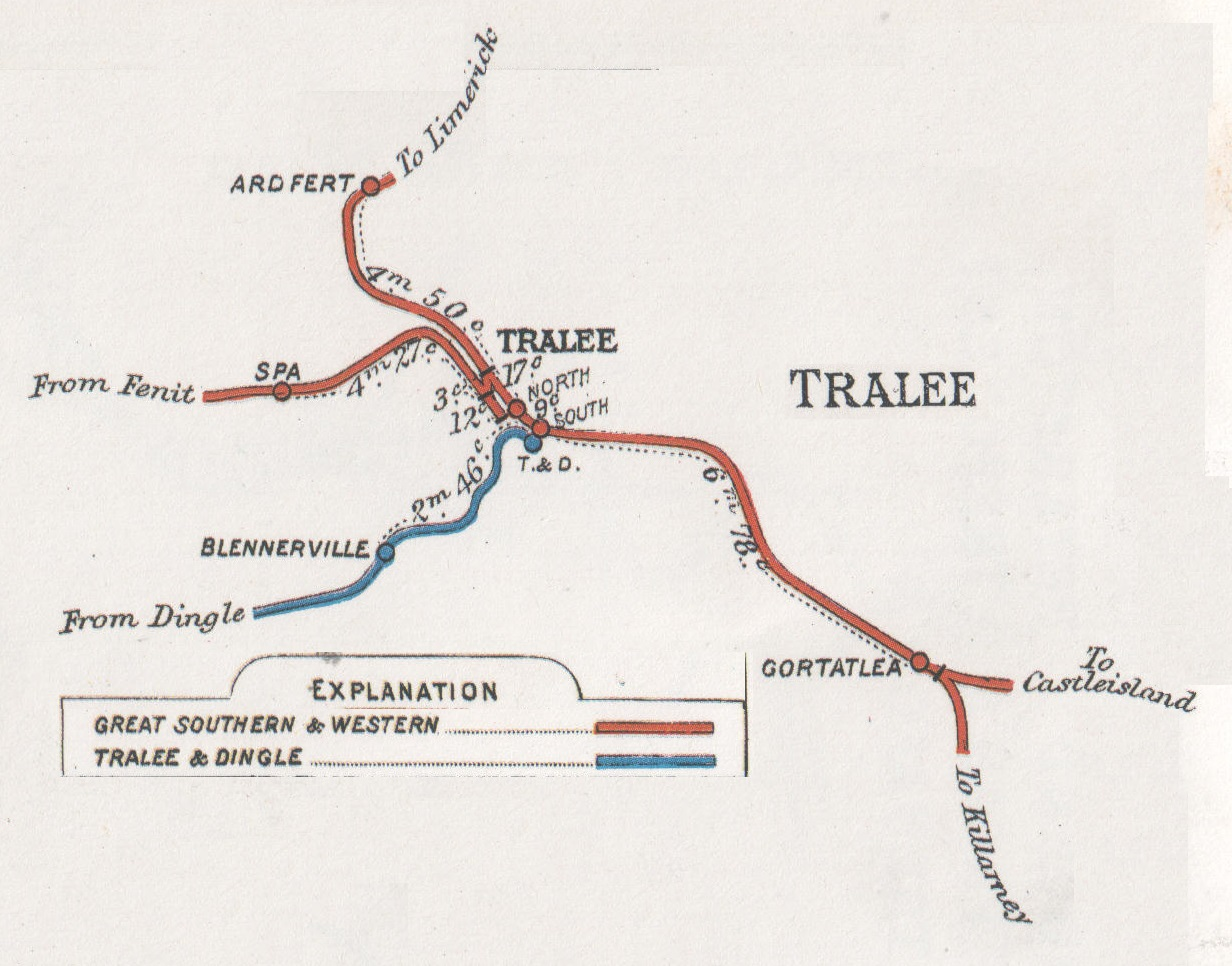
Tralee rail connection early 1900s after GS&WR absorption

The Limerick–Tralee line, also known as the North Kerry line, is a former railway line from Limerick railway station to Tralee railway station in Ireland. It also has branch lines to Foynes and Fenit. Much of the line today has now been converted into a greenway, the Great Southern Trail.

== History ==
The Limerick and Foynes Railway, starting at a junction just outside Limerick ran to Foynes, some 26 1/2 miles (42.6 km) distant, via Ballingrane Junction. The Rathkeale and Newcastle Junction Railway Company were responsible for the section 10 miles (16 km) section from Ballingrane Junction to Newcastle West with the Limerick and Kerry Railway Company taking responsibility for remainder of the line to Tralee which opened in December 1880.

Tralee and Fenit Railway Act 1880
- Act of Parliament
- Parliament of the United Kingdom
- Long title: An Act for making a Railway from Tralee to Fenit, in the county of Kerry and for other purposes.
- Citation: 43 & 44 Vict. c. clxxix

Dates
- Royal assent: 26 August 1880

Text of statute as originally enacted

All sections were operated by the Waterford and Limerick Railway (W&LR) as they opened. (Note: It was common for sections of the railway to be financed and built by separate companies supported by an operating company with the operating company leasing or buying the line section following completion) (Note: Casserley (1974) and Ahrons (1954) may have discrepancies in the opening dates of intermediate sections) An additional 8 miles (13 km) branch was authorised by the Tralee and Fenit Railway Act 1880 (43 & 44 Vict. c. clxxix) opened from Tralee to Fenit by the Tralee and Fenit Railway in 1887.

At Tralee the Great Southern and Western Railway (GS&WR) line approached from the east while the W&LR came in from the northwest, the two lines being connected but each initially having their own independent station until 1907.

In 1901, the WL&WR was bought by the GS&WR, then during the grouping of 1925, the GS&WR was merged with three other companies to form the Great Southern Railways (GSR). After the war, the Transport Act 1944 dissolved the GSR and brought its assets into the ownership of Córas Iompair Éireann (CIÉ) on 1 January 1945. The line stayed in the ownership of CIÉ until the line was closed to passengers on 4 February 1963 and for freight up to Listowel in 1977 and to Tralee on 6 February 1978.

The Foynes–Limerick section of the line was open to freight traffic until 2001, when it was closed and mothballed. In November 2022, it was announced that work had begun on restoring the line, which is scheduled to reopen to freight in 2025, with the possibility of passenger services being restored at a later date.

== Route ==
The line travelled through the countryside of County Limerick and County Kerry, linking the city of Limerick and the town of Tralee with towns primarily along the N21 road corridor. It began at Colbert station in Limerick, and passed through: Patrickswell, where a branch line to Charleville connected there with the Dublin-Cork railway line, Adare, a second branch connected with the freight port at Foynes diverging at Ballingrane Junction, Rathkeale, Newcastle West, Abbeyfeale, Listowel, where a connection was made with the Lartigue Monorail to Ballybunnion, Lixnaw, Abbeydorney, Ardfert, and finally Tralee, where trains continued to Killarney and Mallow, and a branch line went to Fenit.

== Sources ==
- Ahrons, E. L. (1954). L. L. Asher (ed.). Locomotive and train working in the latter part of the nineteenth century". Vol. six. W Heffer & Sons Ltd.
- Casserley, H.C. (1974). Outine of Irish Railway History. Newton Abbot: David & Charles. ISBN 0715363778.
