= Adare railway station =

Former railway station in County Limerick, Ireland

Adare Áth Dara
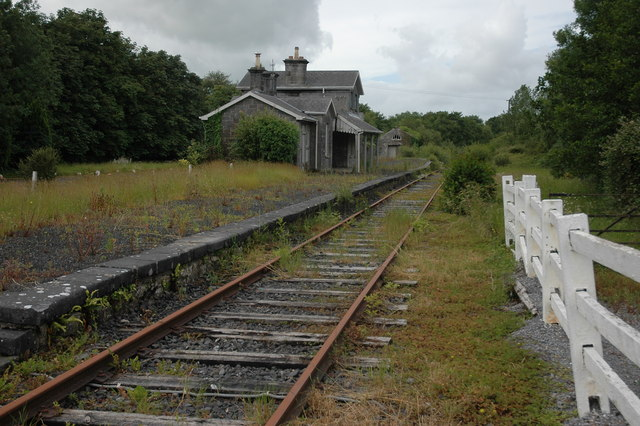
- The station in 2007

General information
- Location: Adare, County Limerick; Ireland
- Coordinates: 52.5682°N 8.798°W

History
- Opened: 12 July 1856
- Closed: 4 February 1963
- Original company: Limerick and Foynes, Waterford and Limerick
- Pre-grouping: Great Southern and Western Railway
- Post-grouping: Great Southern Railways
Location

Adare railway station served Adare in County Limerick, Ireland from 1856 until the mid 20th century.

== History ==
The station was opened by the Waterford and Limerick and Limerick and Foynes railways, then absorbed into the Great Southern and Western Railway. In 1924 the Railways Act passed by the Oireachtas of the Irish Free State moved the station to the Great Southern Railway. In 1925, another merger led to management by the Great Southern Railways. Then it was moved to the CIÉ by the Transport Act 1944 from 1 January 1945, on nationalisation. The station was closed to passenger traffic by CIÉ on 4 February 1963 and to freight on 2 December 1974. Freight trains continued to pass through Adare until the line was mothballed by Irish Rail in 2001. There have been no trains since 7 May 2002 when the annual Irish Rail weed-spray train last visited the line. The last movement on the line was an inspection car, which travelled the line on 9 January 2003.

In an interview on Limerick's Live 95 FM on 18 April 2011, a spokesperson for the Shannon Foynes Port Company said that they were confident that the rail link could be reopened for €7 million. On 10 February 2015, Irish Rail wrote to lineside neighbours informing them of plans (to take place over 6 weeks), to clear the line of vegetation in order to allow a condition survey and inspection of structures to take place. This survey was intended to inform a study that they were undertaking on behalf of the Shannon Foynes Port Company into the re-establishment of rail freight traffic on the line.

With the completion of the Foynes Railway Project in 2026, it is anticipated that Adare will act as a temporary platform for passengers for the Ryder Cup in 2027.

== Structures ==
As of 2007, the building and platform were still in good condition (with "no serious deterioration") next to the mothballed railway.

Preceding station	Disused railways	Following station
Kilgobbin	Great Southern and Western Railway; Limerick–Foynes	Ballingrane
