= Abbeyfeale railway station =

Former railway station in Ireland

Abbeyfeale Mainistir na Féile

General information
- Location: Abbeyfeale, County Limerick; Ireland
- Coordinates: 52.3940°N 9.3012°W

History
- Opened: 20 December 1880
- Closed: 4 February 1974
- Original company: Limerick and Kerry Railway
- Pre-grouping: Great Southern and Western Railway
- Post-grouping: Great Southern Railways
Location

Abbeyfeale railway station served the market town of Abbeyfeale in County Limerick, Ireland.

== History ==
Opened by the Limerick and Kerry Railway, by the beginning of the 20th century the station was run by the Great Southern and Western Railway. It was absorbed into the Great Southern Railways in 1925.

The station was then nationalised, passing on to the Córas Iompair Éireann as a result of the Transport Act 1944 which took effect from 1 January 1945. It was closed in 1963 and has since been owned privately.

Preceding station	Disused railways	Following station
Devon Road	Waterford and Limerick Railway; Great Southern and Western Railway	Kilmorna
