= Askeaton =

Town in County Limerick, Ireland

Askeaton Eas Géitine
- Town
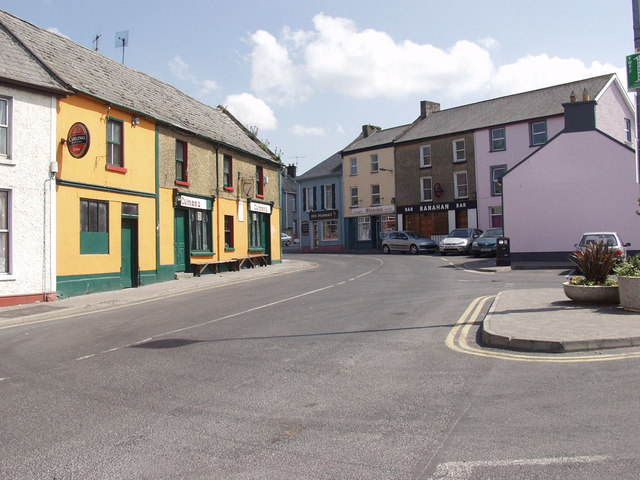
- The Square

- Location in Ireland
- Coordinates: 52°36′00″N 8°58′38″W
- Country: Ireland
- Province: Munster
- County: County Limerick

Population (2016)
  - Total: 1,137
- Irish Grid Reference: R337503

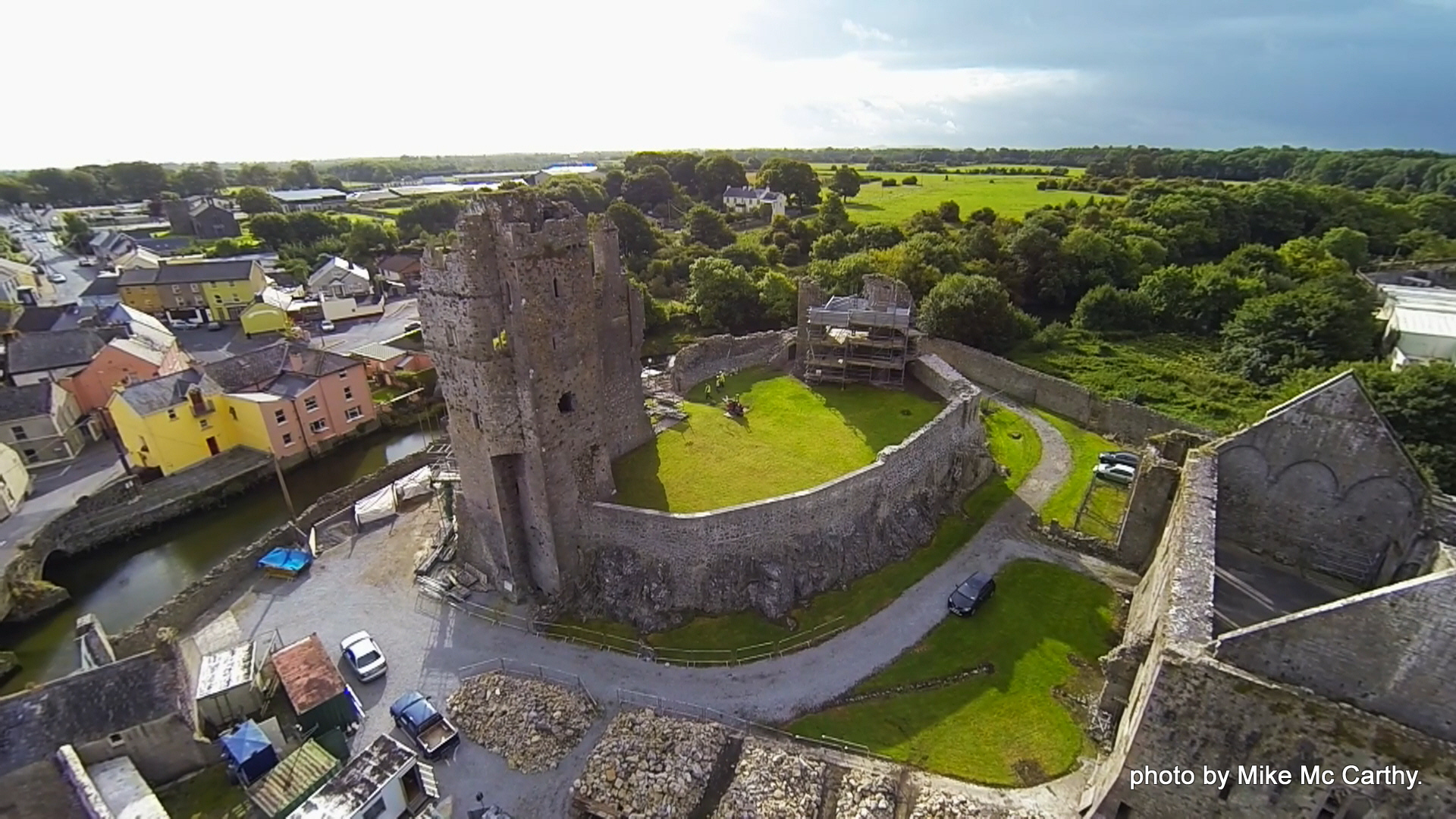
Askeaton Castle and River Deel

Askeaton (Irish: Eas Géitine, Waterfall of Géitine, also historically spelt Askettin) is a town in County Limerick, Ireland. The town is built on the banks of the River Deel which flows into the Shannon Estuary 3 km to the north. Askeaton is on the N69 road between Limerick and Tralee; it is 25 km west of Limerick and 8 km north of Rathkeale. The town is in a townland and civil parish of the same name.

Among the historic structures in the town are a castle dating from 1199 and a Franciscan friary dating from 1389. The castle was abandoned to the English in 1580 – its walls blown up by the fleeing defenders – after the fall of Carrigafoyle Castle during the Desmond Rebellions. Askeaton was a constituency in the Irish House of Commons represented by two members until the dissolution of the parliament in 1801.

== Desmond Castle ==
The focal point of the town is Desmond Castle, which stands in the center of the town on a rocky island on the river Deel. A castle has been located at Askeaton since 1199, when it was given to Hamo de Valoignes, the Justiciary of Ireland between 1197 and 1199. In the Annals of Inisfallen, William de Burgo is recorded as having been granted the castle and estates by Domnall Mór Ua Briain, King of Thomond.

In 1348, Maurice FitzGerald, 1st Earl of Desmond paid 40 shillings for the barony of Lystifti. The building that stands today dates from that time. The Earls of Desmond were to become a powerful presence in Munster, of whom it was said that they had become "more Irish than the Irish themselves" – they lived like Irish clan chiefs, following the Brehon Law, dressed in the Irish manner, spoke Munster Irish, played Irish traditional music and Gaelic games, rode and hunted, and offered hospitality to poets in return for praise poetry.

The family had generations of clan warfare against the Clan MacCarthy to the south in Cork and Kerry and against their mortal Hiberno-Norman enemies, the House of Butler Earls of Ormond.

The earliest written reference to the castle appears in Leabhar nan Ceart, in English The Book of Rights, compiled in the 15th century, in which the fort of Gephtine is mentioned as being reserved to the King of Cashel.

The Earls of Desmond, the FitzGeralds, held possession of the castle for over 200 years; it was the centre of their power, and they ruled Munster from it. The tragic Gerald FitzGerald, 14th Earl of Desmond, had a powerful stronghold at Askeaton in 1559.

The English launched a policy of total war and scorched earth upon the Irish clans who rebelled across the whole Munster. Gerald, known as "The Rebel Earl", was at first very popular among his followers, but as the atrocities of the Tudor army caused mass starvation throughout the region, the clans of Munster gradually abandoned the Earl's banner. Fleeing with a few retainers, on 11 November 1583 he was murdered by Moriarty of Castledrum, at Glenagenty, five miles east of Tralee at Bóthar an Iarlaigh.

Sir Nicholas Malby unsuccessfully attacked the castle in 1579.

During the Cromwellian conquest of Ireland, Askeaton Castle was occupied by Lieutenant Patrick Purcell of the confederate Catholics. The Roundheads saw Askeaton as a threat while it was under Catholic control. It was destroyed in 1652 by New Model Army Captain Daniel Axtell, who also hanged Lt. Patrick Purcell. The Lord Justice Sir William Pelham subsequently took possession. It was the end of the FitzGerald reign over Askeaton and Munster.

The castle was transferred to the ownership of the English crown under Captain Edward Berkley.

== Franciscan Friary ==
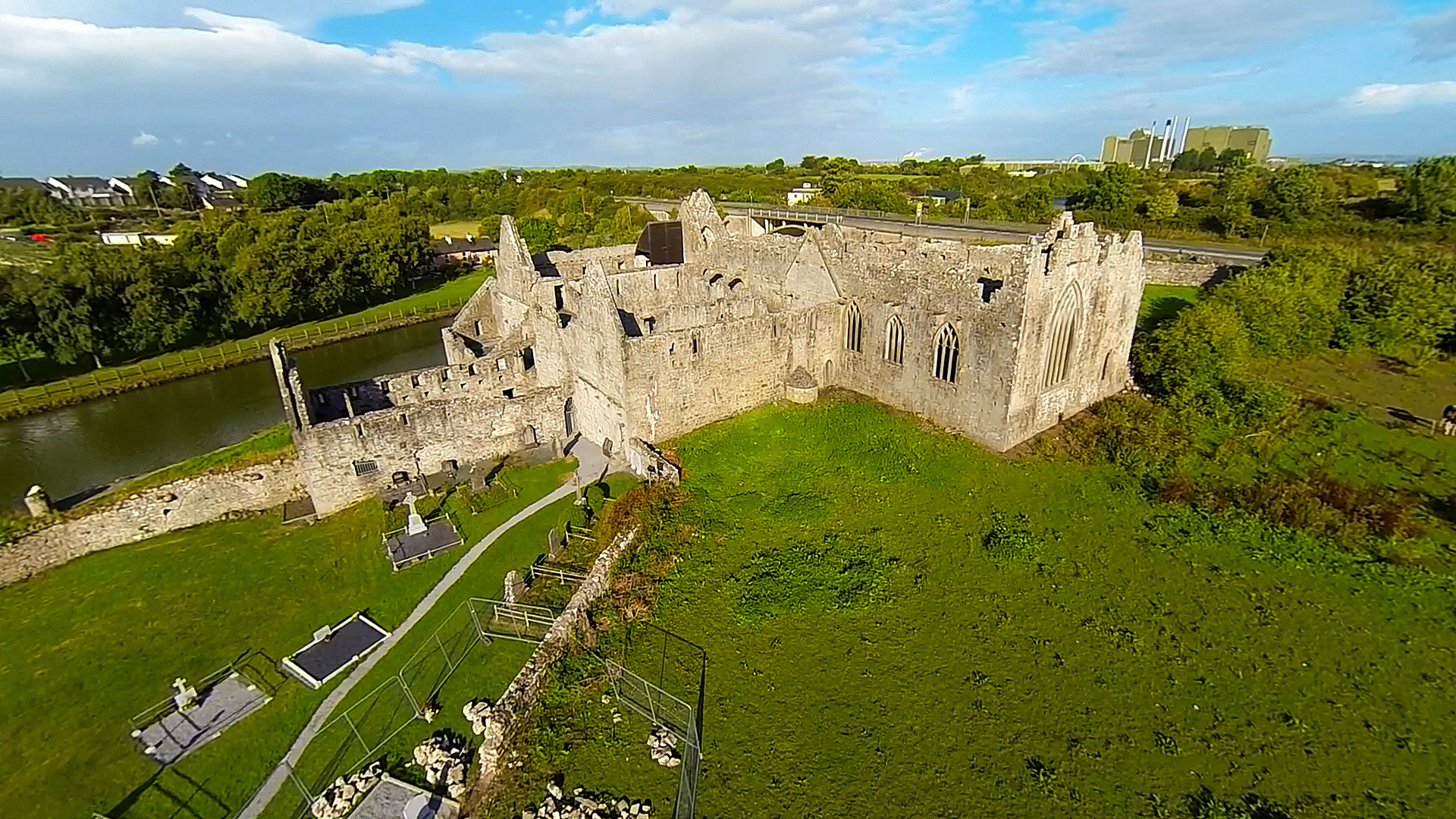
Franciscan friary

Gerald FitzGerald, 3rd Earl of Desmond is said still to sleep in a cave waiting to ride back on his silver-shod steed in Ireland's time of ultimate need, founded Askeaton Abbey in about 1389. It has cloisters with 12 arches on each side, an east window, mediaeval carvings, and a chapter room that is the final resting place of the martyrs Bishop Patrick O'Healy and Fr Conn O'Rourke.

On 9 October 1579, after failing to take Askeaton Castle, the English commander Sir Nicholas Malby attacked the town and burned the friary, killing most of the friars, some in a gruesome fashion, and wrecked the ancestral tombs of the Desmonds, in a mean-spirited attack to take revenge on the earl in his impenetrable fortress. Monks returned to the friary only in 1627 but the community did not reach its former numbers until 1642. The community again abandoned the site in 1648 when Cromwell's forces neared Askeaton, and did not return until the 1650s. The friary permanently closed in 1740.

== St Mary's Church ==
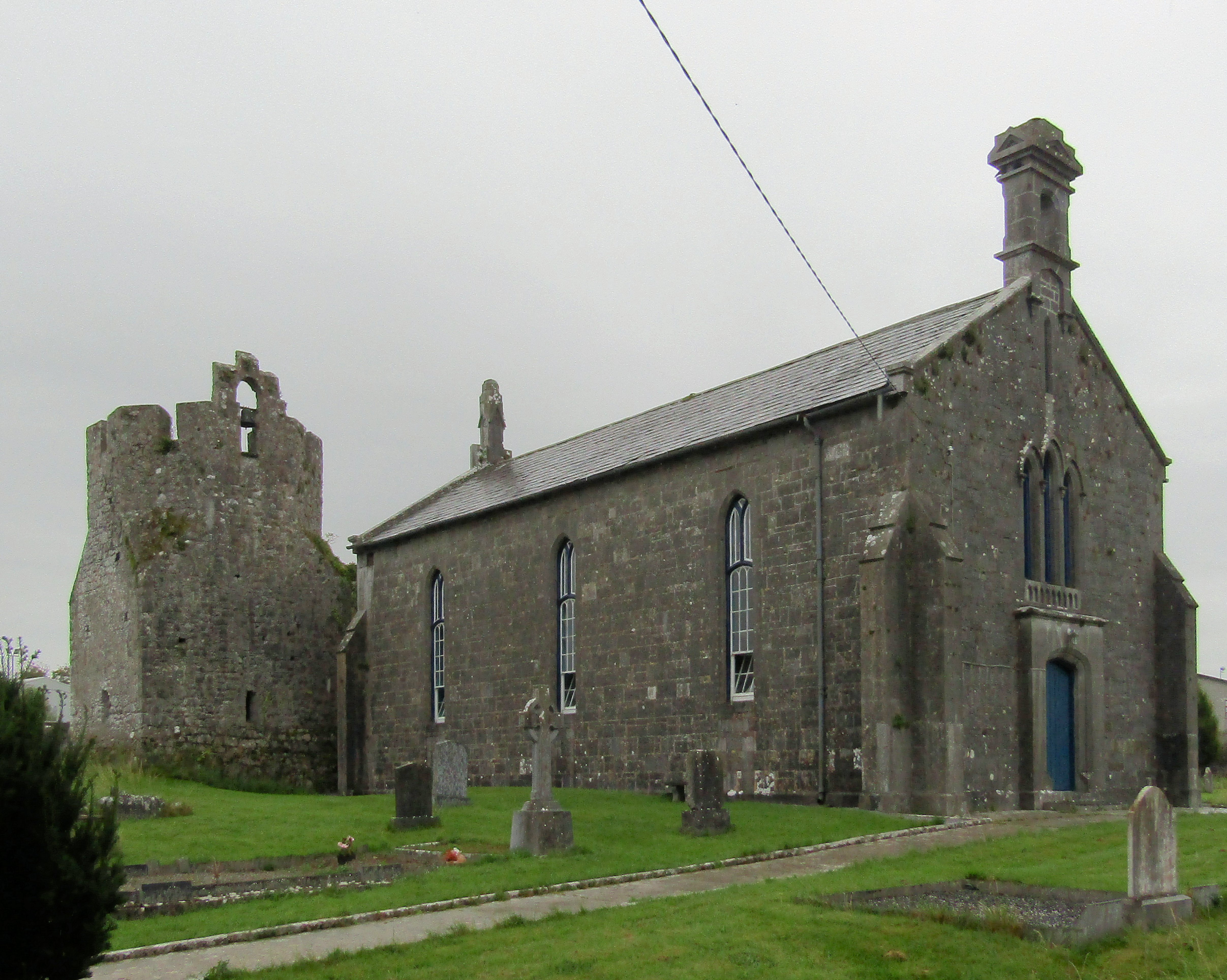
Saint Mary's Church

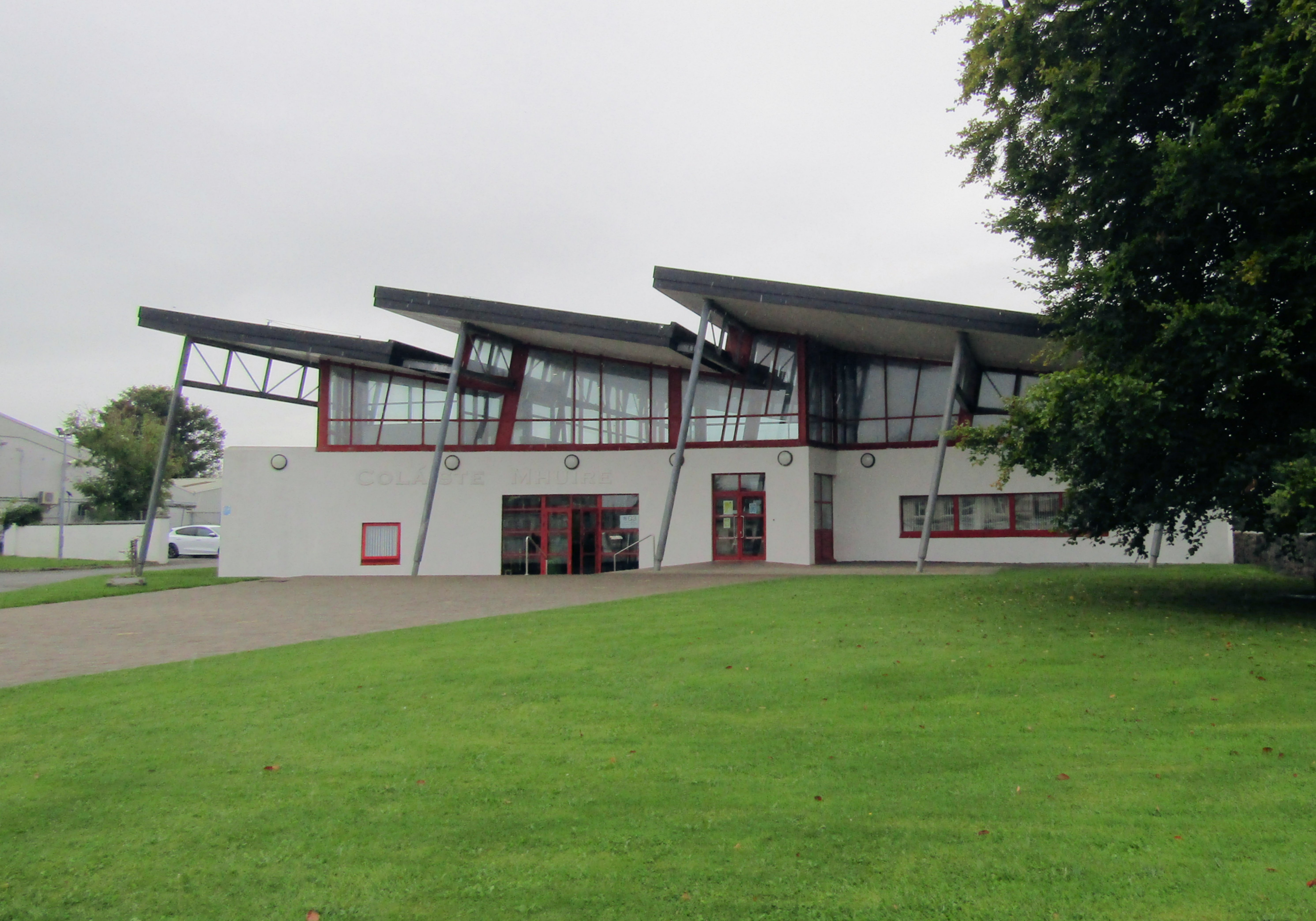
Mary`s College

The present Catholic church was built in 1851, after the previous building near the Franciscan friary was totally destroyed by fire in 1847. It is built of local limestone and has stained glass windows. The window to the right of the transept shows the resurrection of Christ, and that on the left his ascension into heaven. In the centre of the nave are windows showing St Patrick receiving the two daughters of King Laoire, the King of Ireland, into the church, and Jesus with children, and over the main door of the church a window shows the Virgin Mary. Over the door is a statue of the Pieta.

The Church of Ireland also has a church in the town, St Mary's, with a clergyman resident in Rathkeale.

== Hellfire Club ==
East of the castle is the remains of the Hellfire Club, an almost intact redbrick building built in 1740 (the same year the monks abandoned the nearby friary).

This bizarre secret society was founded in Dublin in 1735 by the Earl of Rosse, first Grand Master of the Irish Freemasons. It is one of two in Ireland (the other is outside Dublin). The Hellfire Clubs, throughout Ireland and Britain, were 18th-century clubs where rich men gathered to drink, gamble, and allegedly have mock crucifixions and homosexual orgies.

Lurid rumours around Hellfire Clubs included visits by the devil and human sacrifice. These clubs popularised the combination of whiskey, butter and cream mulled by a red-hot poker known as "scaltheen". The club closed down by 1800. The façade of the building collapsed in the 1990s.

== Community hall ==
In the late 1940s and early 1950s, the community organisation Muintir na Tíre built a community hall for the parish. Built in a time of economic depression, it was constructed with the voluntary labour of local people. It became a focal point in the social life of the town, used for dances, concerts and bingo. It replaced the library (which was too small) as a dance hall. It was also used as a national school while the new building was being built in 1962/63, and as a church when masses were held there during the 1977 refurbishment of St Mary's Catholic church.

== Transport ==
The railway line that passes through the now closed Askeaton railway station was built by the former Limerick and Foynes Railway Company from 1856 to 1858, with the station opening on 12 May 1857. The Limerick–Foynes railway line had stations at Patrickswell, Kilgobbin, Adare, Ballingrane Junction (Rathkeale) and Askeaton. The railway line to Foynes passes north of the town, but Askeaton railway station was closed to passenger traffic on 4 February 1963 and freight on 2 December 1974, when the station closed.

Trains for Foynes continued to pass through Askeaton until the line effectively lost all its freight services in 2000. In an interview on Limerick's Live 95fm on 18 April 2011, Kay McGuinness, chair of Shannon Foynes Port Company, said that they were confident that the rail link could be reopened. A subsequent campaign by the residents of Station Road focused on preventing Iarnród Éireann from removing the railway gates at the station.

There are plans to reopen the line on time for 2027 Ryder Cup.

== Sport and culture ==
Askeaton GAA is a Gaelic Athletic Association club based in the village. Munster football championship games, known as Páirc na nGael, were held on the club's pitch in 1970 and between 1987 and 1991.

Askeaton Contemporary Arts is an artists' residency programme that has taken place in Askeaton each summer since 2006.

== See also ==
- Askeaton (Parliament of Ireland constituency)
- List of towns and villages in Ireland
- Killeen Cowpark, located 5 km east
