= Askeaton Contemporary Arts =

Arts organisation in Ireland

Askeaton Contemporary Arts (ACA) is artist-run organisation based in Askeaton, County Limerick, Ireland. It organises residencies and exhibitions that are site-specific and made in response to the "dynamics of the locale". Since 2006, an artist residency programme has invited Irish and international artists to present new work in Askeaton each summer. ACA also has a publishing programme, titled "ACA Public".

== Residency ==
Askeaton Contemporary Arts has hosted an annual artists residency and events programme, titled "Welcome to the Neighbourhood", since 2006. The residency takes place each summer with artists researching, producing and presenting new artworks in the town. Artworks have been made and exhibited in a variety of spaces including a pub, hair salon, World War II-era pillboxes, the ruins of Askeaton's mediaeval castle, and nearby Askeaton Abbey. The coinciding public programme usually takes Askeaton and its environs as its theme.

In 2022, a residency house was established in Askeaton as a dedicated space for artists to stay and work on longer-term projects. The site was once a home for the keepers of Beeves Rock lighthouse in the Shannon Estuary and is now used as an artists' studio and event space.
