= Ardfert railway station =

Railway station in Ireland

Coordinates: 52.3199°N 9.7509°W

Ardfert Ard Fhearta

General information
- Location: Ardfert, County Kerry; Ireland

History
- Original company: Limerick and Kerry Railway
- Pre-grouping: Great Southern and Western Railway
- Post-grouping: Great Southern Railways

Key dates
- 20 December 1880: Station opens
- 4 February 1963: Station closes to passengers
- 6 February 1978: Station closes entirely

Services
Preceding station	Disused railways	Following station
Abbeydorney	Great Southern and Western Railway; Limerick–Tralee line	Tralee
Location

Ardfert railway station served the village of Ardfert in County Kerry, Ireland.

The station opened on 20 December 1880. Passenger services were withdrawn on 4 February 1963, although the route through Ardfert continued to be used by freight trains for a while before the line to Listowel was finally closed altogether in 1977 and then to Tralee 1978. The station closed on 6 February 1978.
