= Abbeydorney railway station =

Former railway station in Ireland

Abbeydorney Mainistir Ó dTorna
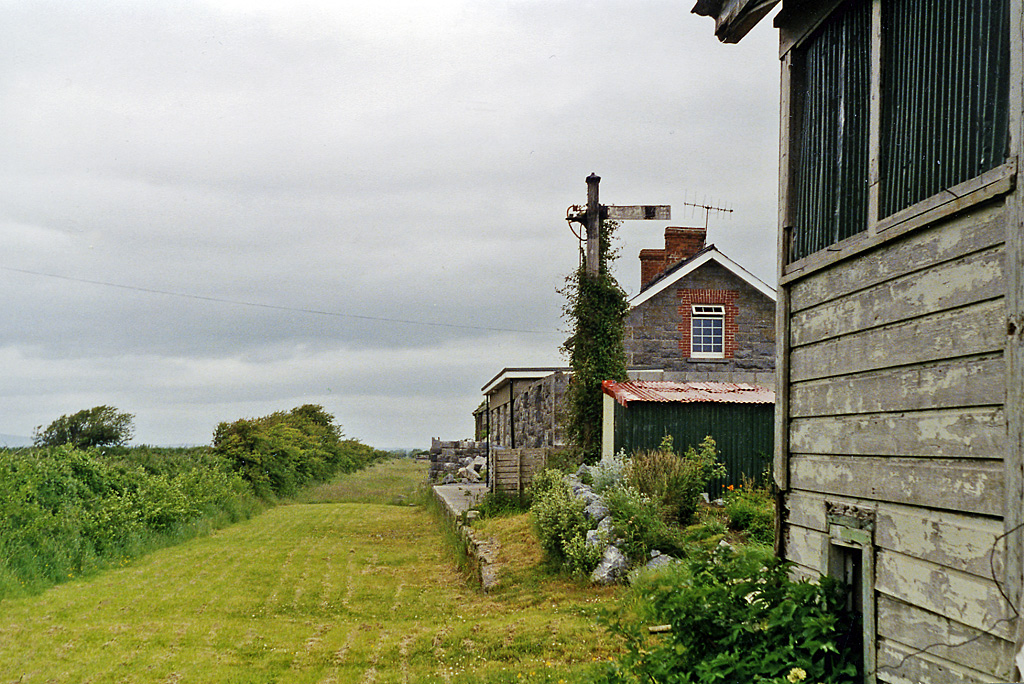

General information
- Location: Abbeydorney, County Kerry; Ireland
- Coordinates: 52.349°N 9.6883°W

History
- Opened: 1880
- Closed: 1978
- Original company: Limerick and Kerry Railway
- Pre-grouping: Great Southern and Western Railway
- Post-grouping: Great Southern Railways

Key dates
- 20 December 1880: Station opens
- 4 February 1963: Station closes to passengers
- 6 February 1978: Station closes entirely
Location

Abbeydorney railway station served the village of Abbeydorney in County Kerry, Ireland.

The station opened on 20 December 1880. The first Station Master appointed to Abbeydorney was a Mr John Hogan, a descendant of the Galloping O'Hogans of Limerick. He is laid to rest across the fields in the Old Abbey. The first passenger train made its maiden trip on 1 November of that year. Passenger services were withdrawn on 4 February 1963, although the route through Abbeydorney continued to be used by freight trains for a while before the line to Listowel was finally closed altogether in 1977 and then to Tralee 1978. The station closed on 6 February 1978.

Preceding station	Disused railways	Following station
Lixnaw	Great Southern and Western Railway; Limerick-Tralee line	Ardfert
