= Askeaton Abbey =

Ruined Franciscan abbey in Limerick, Ireland

- Mainistir Eas Géitine
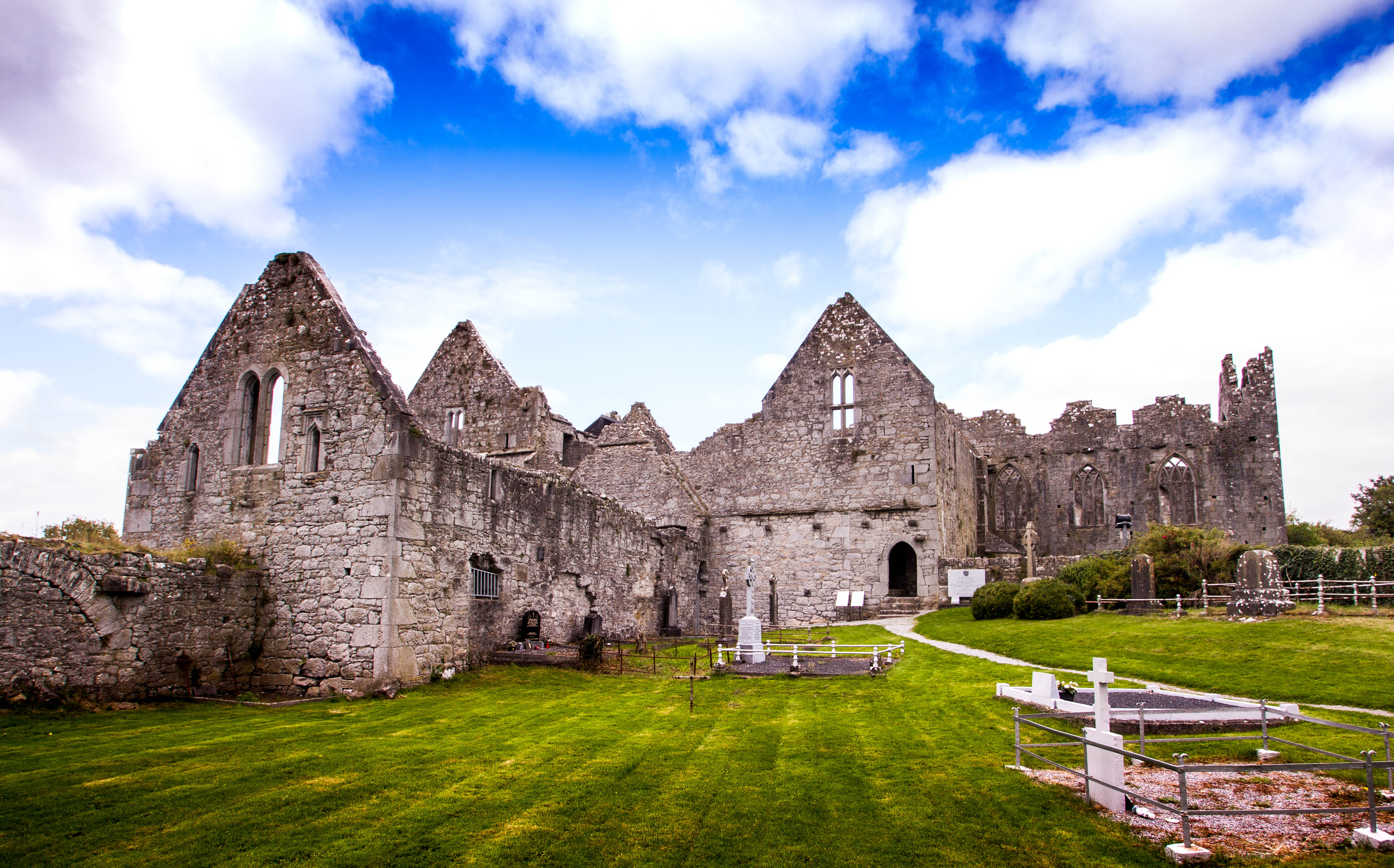

- Location within Ireland
- Interactive map of Askeaton Abbey

Monastery information
- Other names: Athskettin; Easa-geibhteine; Es-geibhteine; Inis-geibhthine; Easa-gebryny; Inisgebryny?
- Order: Order of Friars Minor Conventual; Order of Friars Minor
- Established: 1389–1420
- Disestablished: 1714
- Diocese: Limerick

People
- Founder: Gerald FitzGerald, 3rd Earl of Desmond

Architecture
- Status: Inactive

Site
- Location: Moig South, Askeaton, County Limerick
- Coordinates: 52.603813°N 8.975413°W
- Public access: Yes

Askeaton Abbey or Askeaton Friary is a ruined medieval Franciscan friary located north of Askeaton, County Limerick, Ireland, on the east bank of the River Deel.

== History ==
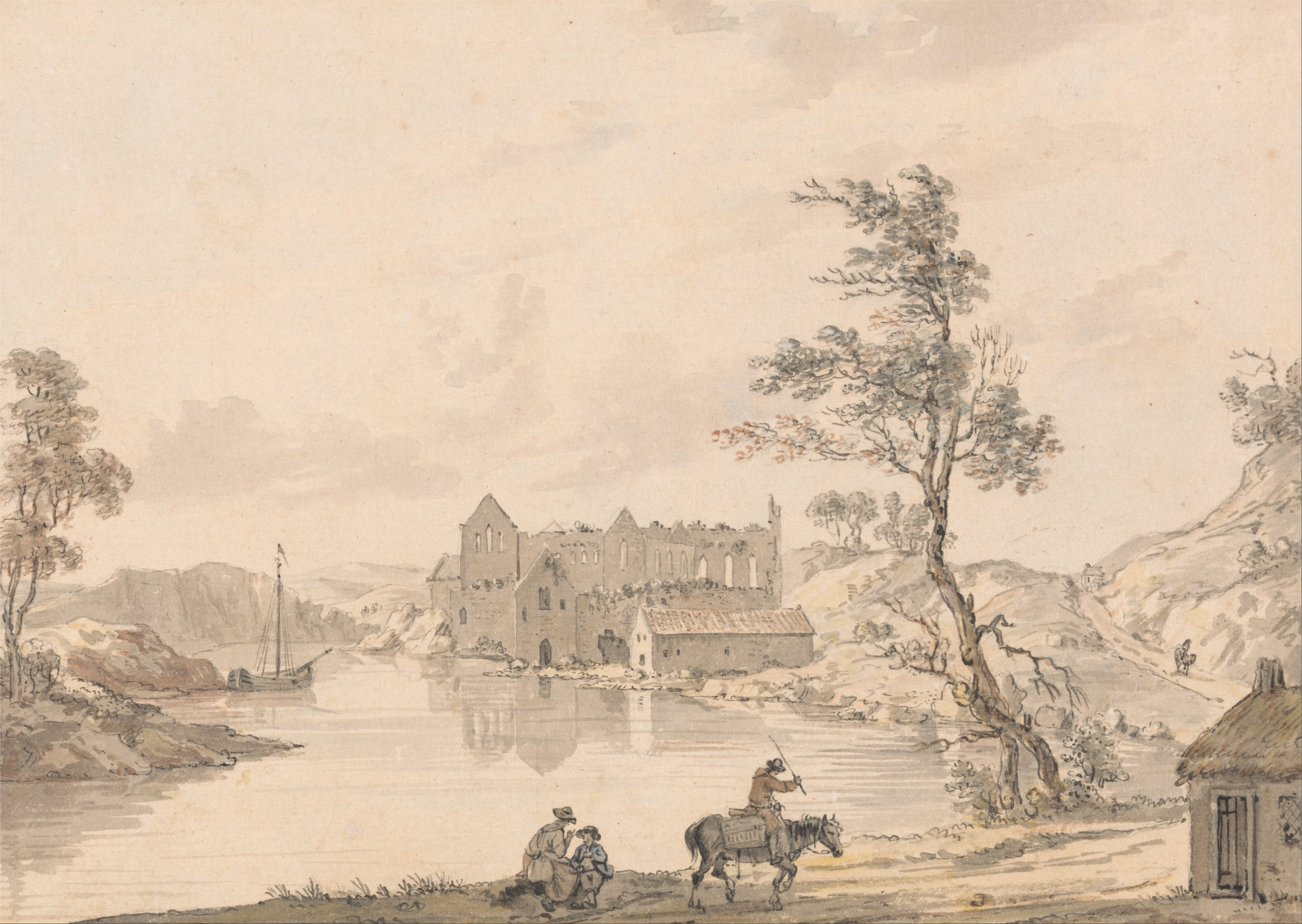
Drawing by Paul Sandby (1731–1809)

Askeaton Abbey was founded for the Order of Friars Minor Conventual by Gerald FitzGerald, 3rd Earl of Desmond between 1389 and 1400; or by James FitzGerald, 6th Earl of Desmond in 1420.

The abbey was reformed under the Order of Friars Minor in 1490; it was reformed again in 1513 and a provincial chapter held there in 1564.

Askeaton was plundered and later abandoned by Nicholas Malby's men in 1579 during the Second Desmond Rebellion, and some of the friars were killed. It was revived in 1627 and abandoned in 1648 when Cromwell’s forces neared. It was reestablished in 1658 and continued to house friars until 1714.

In 1914, four of the "ancient" bells of the monastery were found buried beneath the friary's "front door".

== Architecture ==
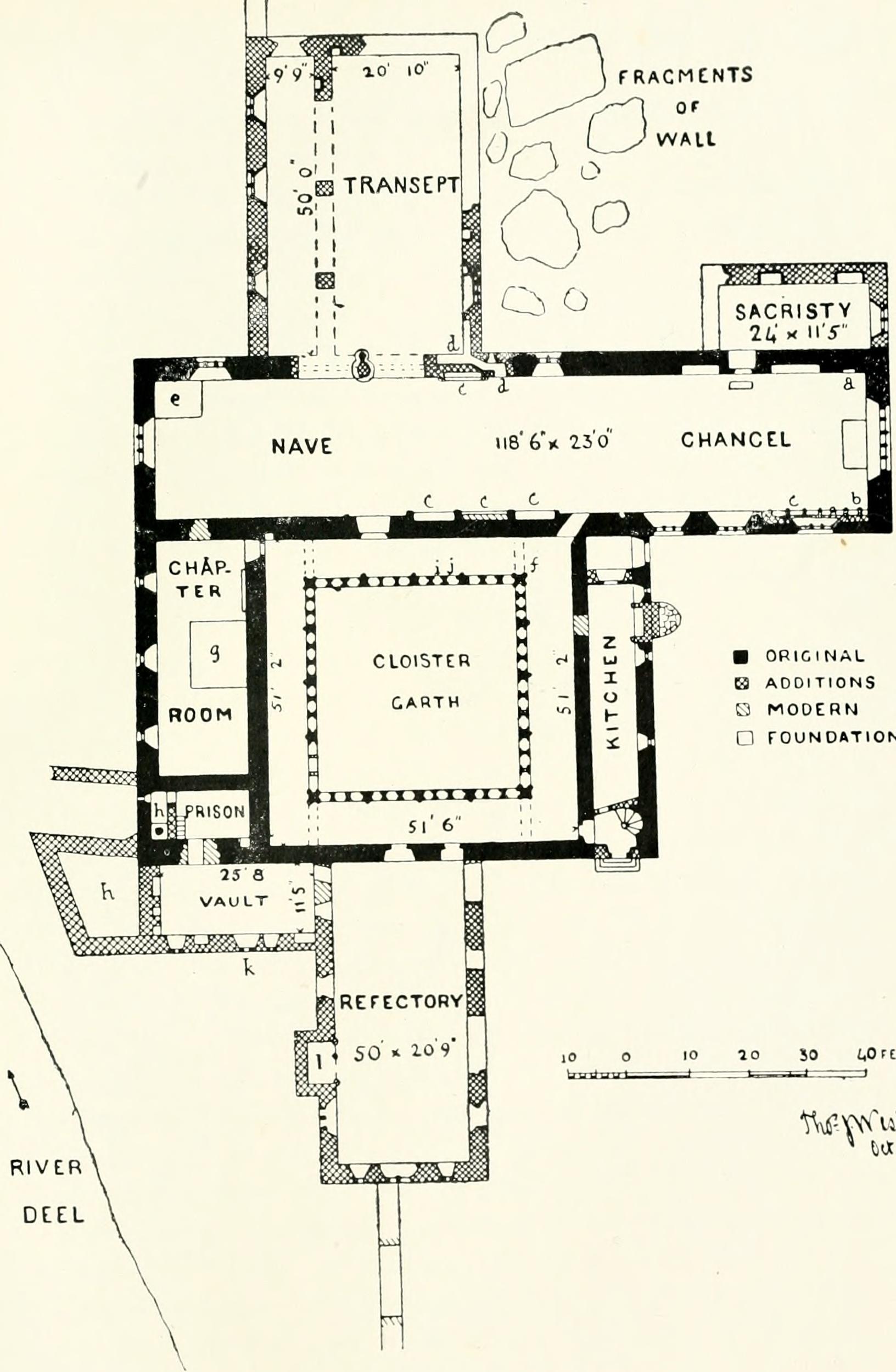
Plan of the friary

The church and its north transept, sacristy, cloister arcade and domestic buildings survive. Notable features include the cloister with its carvings of Francis of Assisi with stigmata, a Mass dial, sedilia, several Fitzgerald dynasty tombs, and a carving of Christ as the Man of Sorrows.

A sketch of the friary in the Pacata Hibernia, dated from some point prior to 1599, shows a large belfry associated with the structure, now entirely destroyed.

The church is rendered in simple Gothic style and is lighted by a large window in the eastern wall. The gable and south wall are battlemented. A plain altar survives. Despite tradition attesting that the Stephenson family had removed the original altar to make a burial place beneath it, this is unlikely to be true.

== Gallery ==
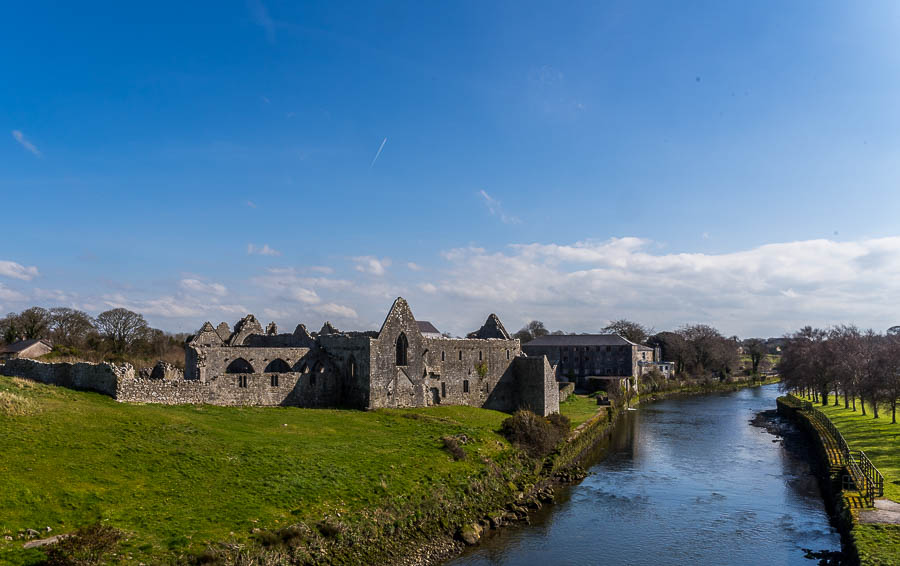
Viewed from the north

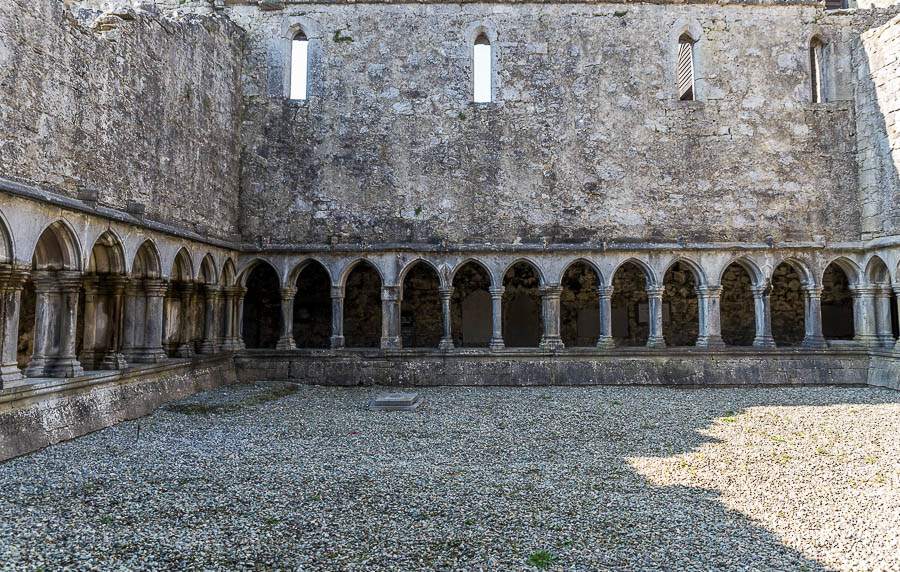
Cloister

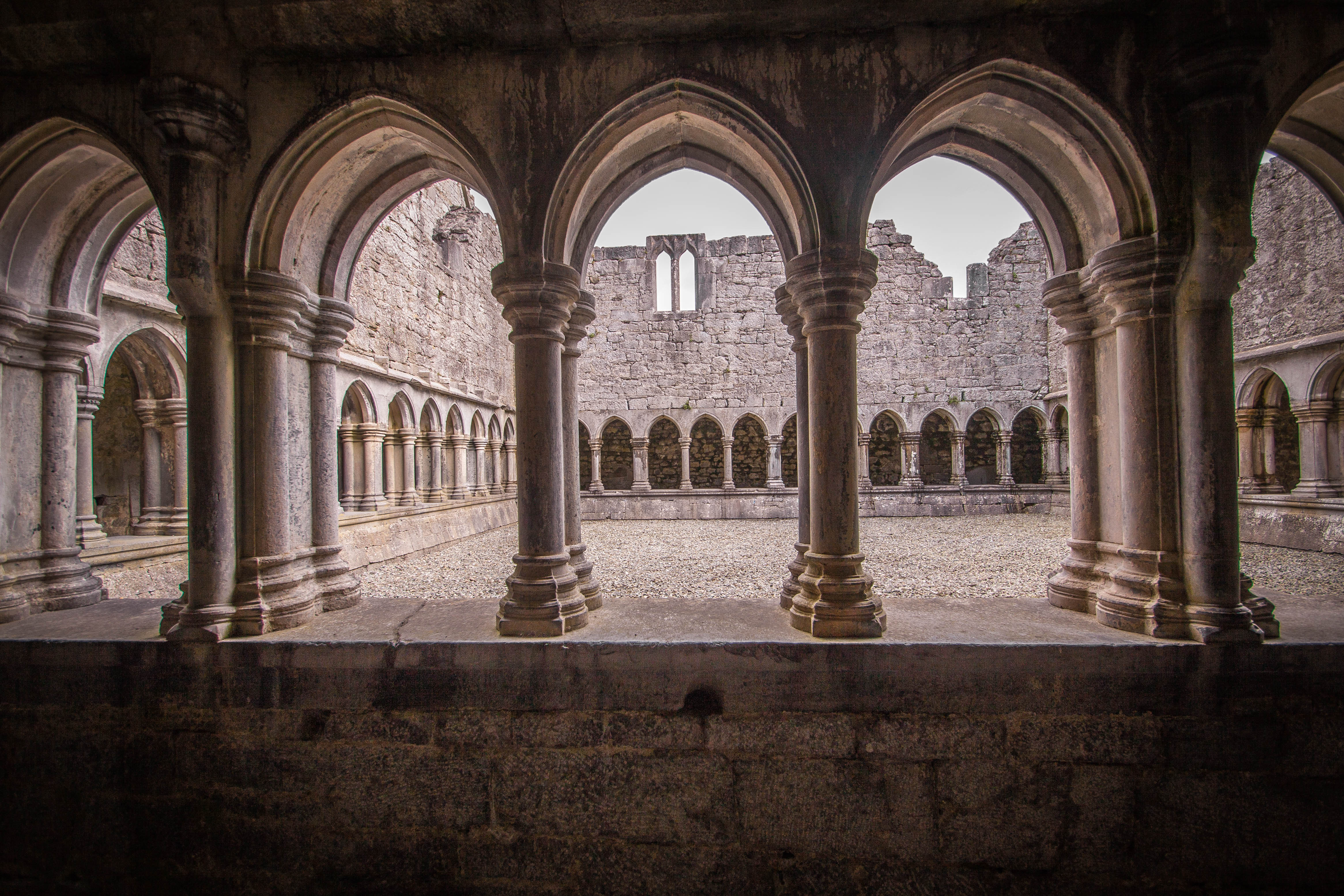
Cloister

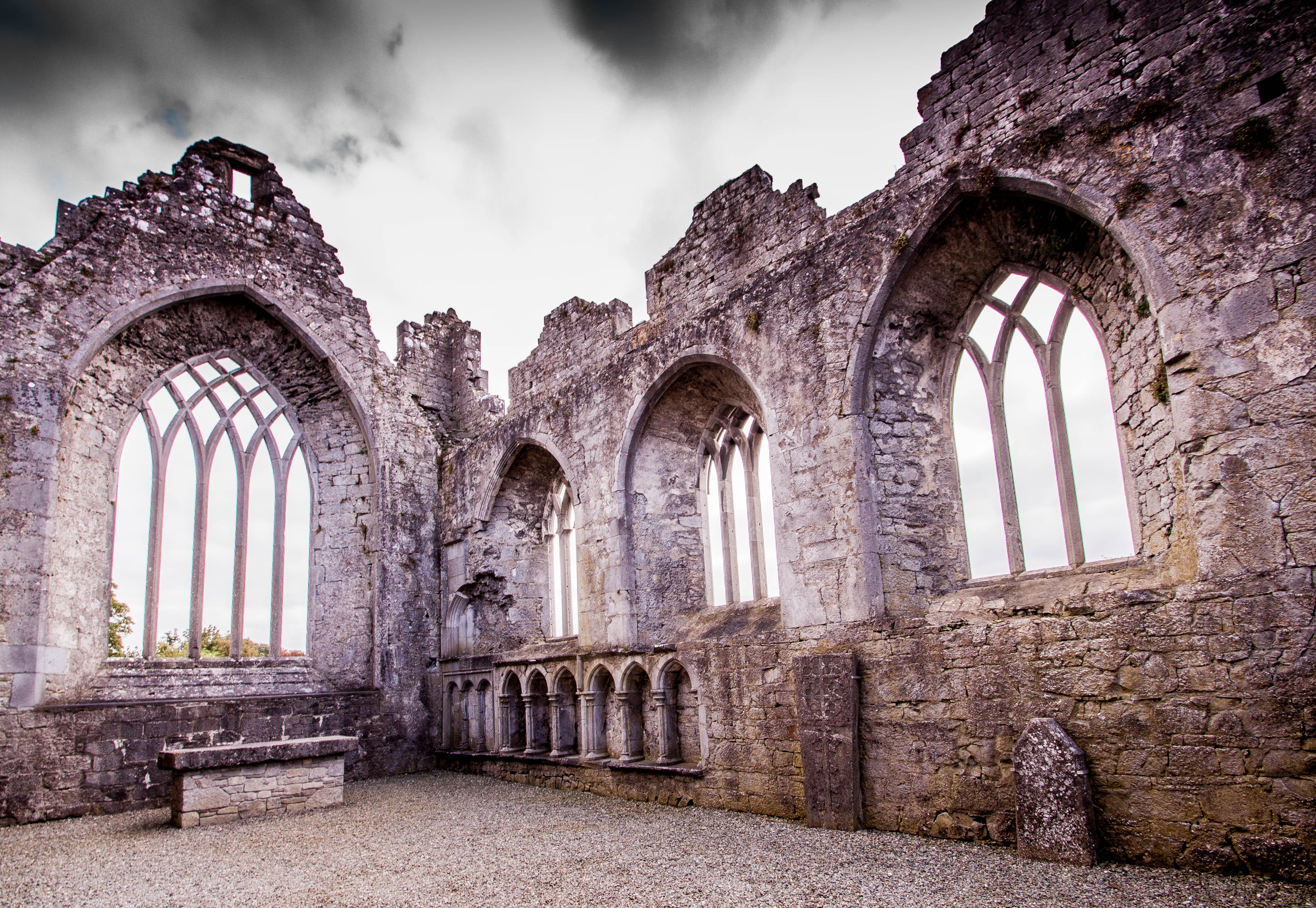
Church ruins

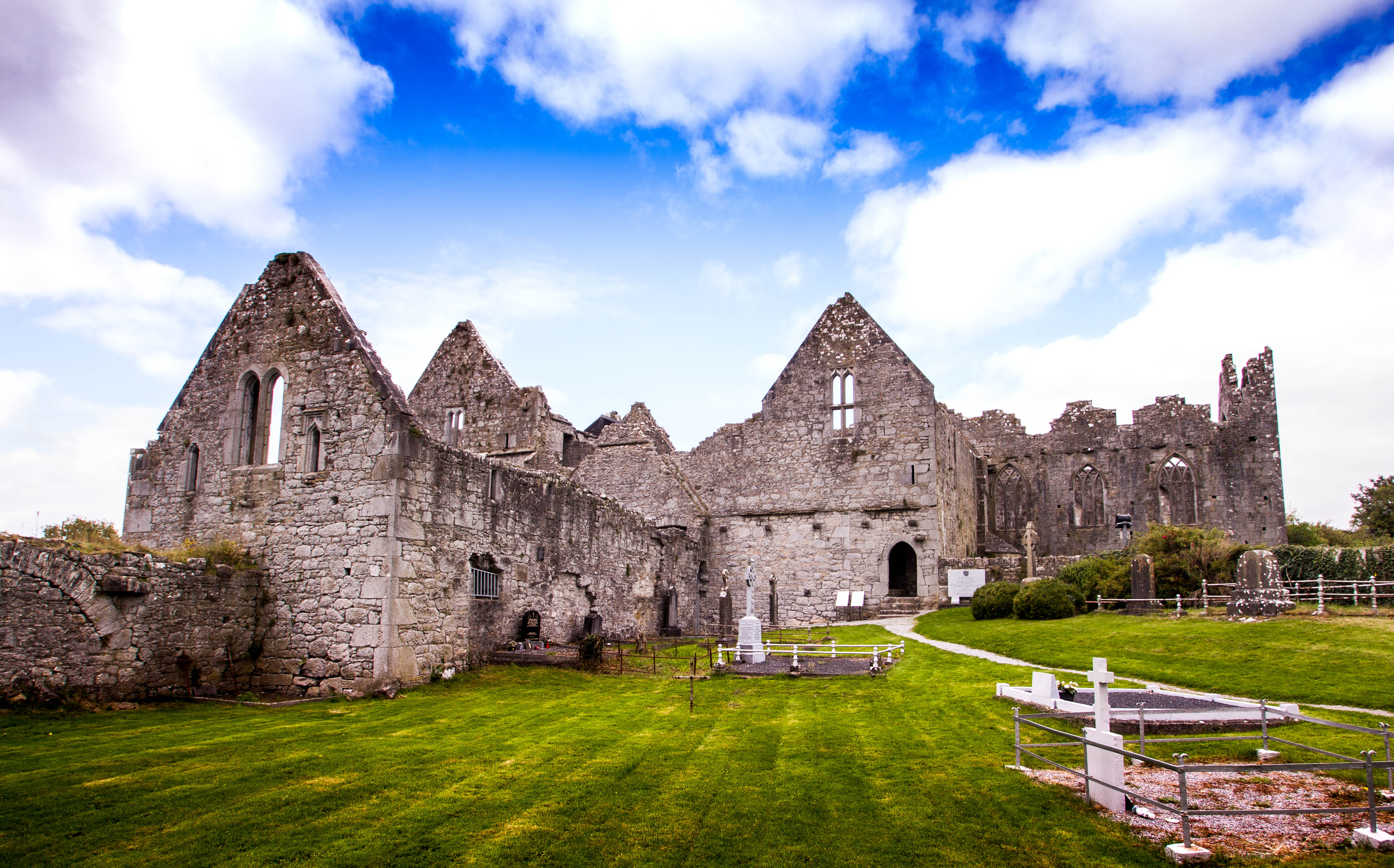

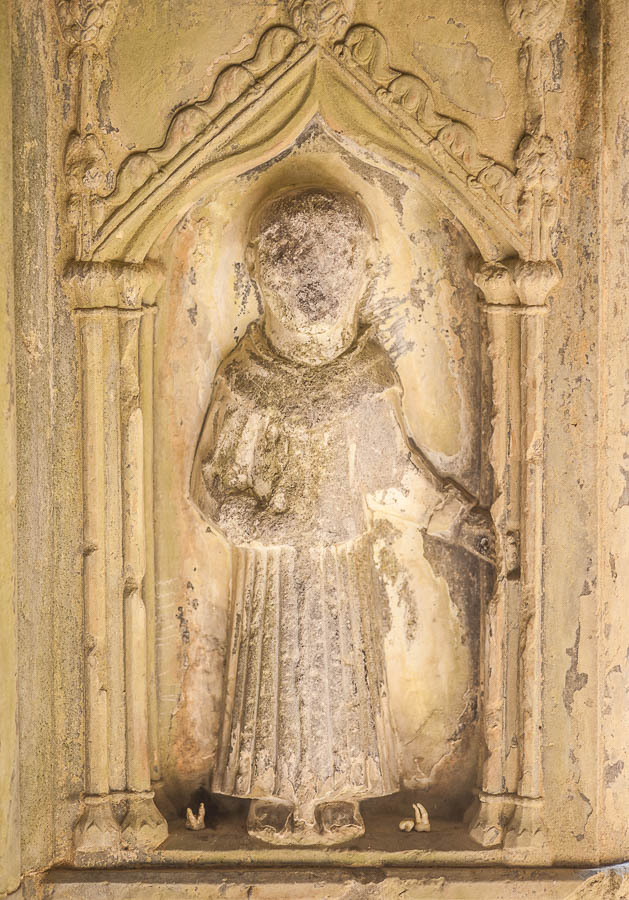
Statue of St Francis, claimed to cure toothache

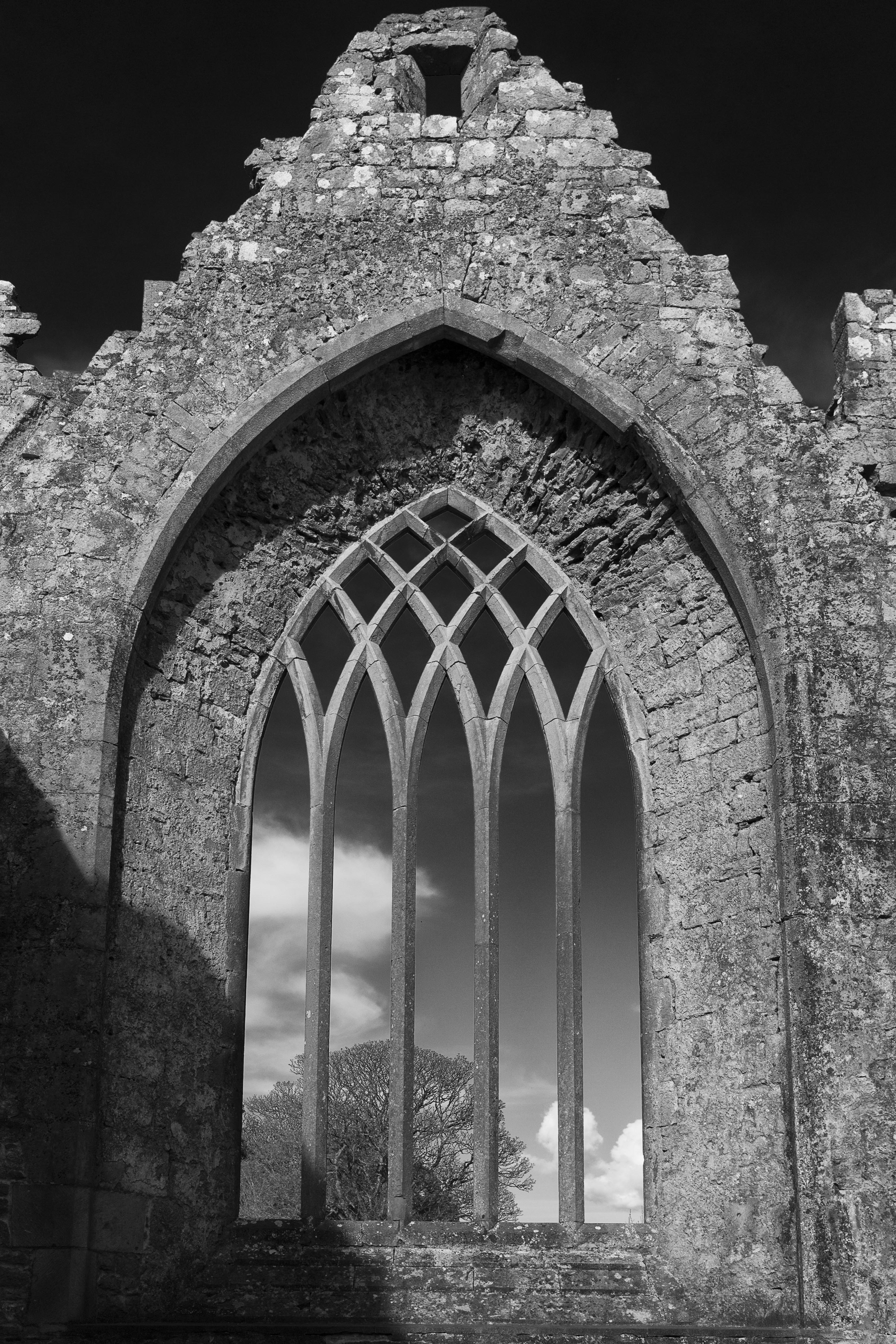
Window with tracery
