= Waterford, Limerick and Western Railway =

Former railway company in Ireland

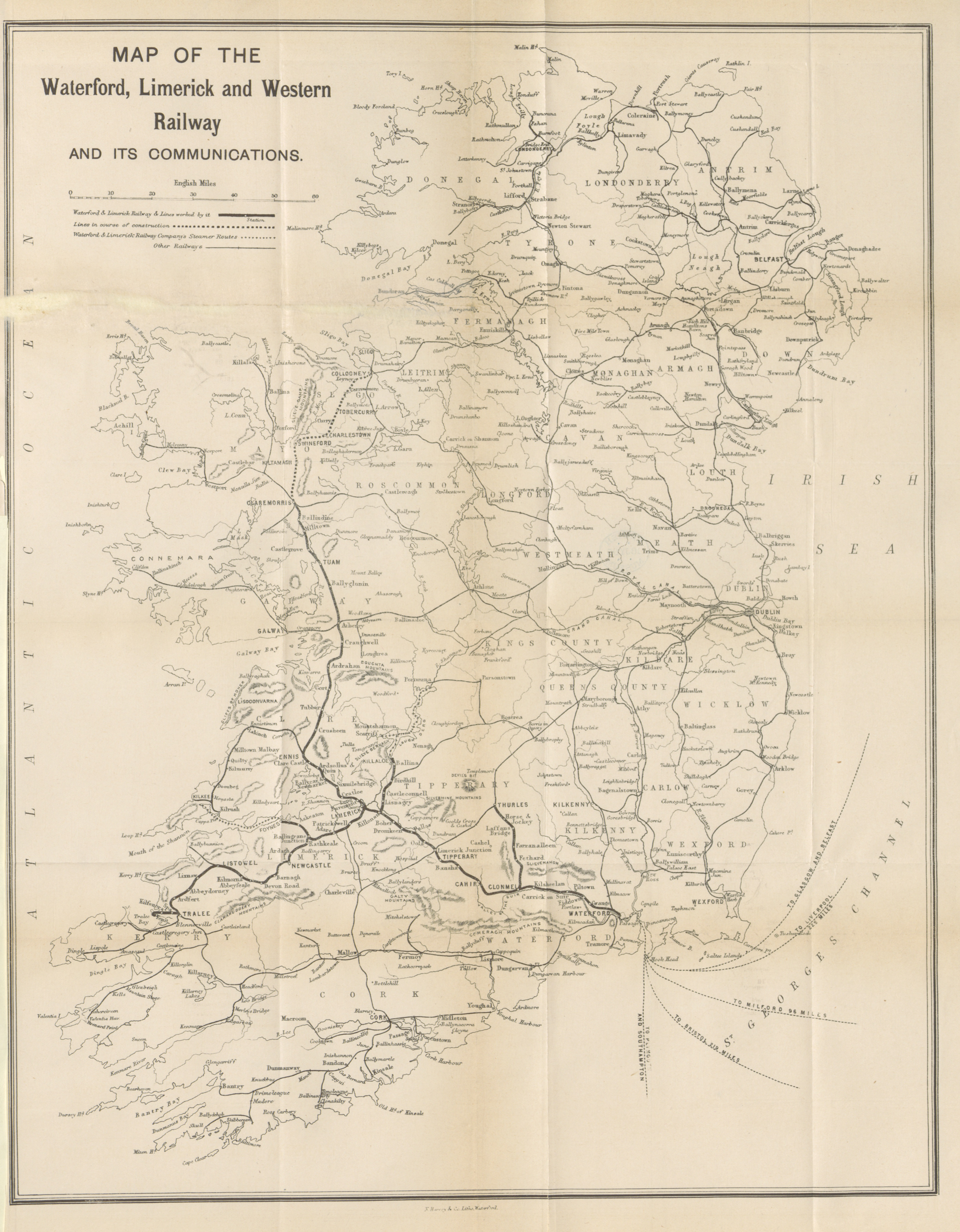
- 1895 map of the railway

Overview
- Headquarters: Limerick
- Dates of operation: 1848–1900
- Successor: Great Southern and Western Railway

Technical
- Track gauge: 1,600 mm (5 ft 3 in)
- Length: 342.5 miles (551.2 km)

The Waterford, Limerick and Western Railway (WL&WR), formerly the Waterford and Limerick Railway (W&LR) up to 1896, was at the time it was amalgamated with the Great Southern and Western Railway in 1901 the fourth largest railway in Ireland, with a main line stretching from Limerick to Waterford and branches to Sligo and Tralee.

== Inception ==
Limerick and Waterford Railway Act 1826
- Act of Parliament
- Parliament of the United Kingdom
- Long title: An Act for making and maintaining a Railway or Tramroad from the City of Limerick to the Town of Carrick in the County of Tipperary, with several Branches therefrom in the County of Tipperary aforesaid and in the County of the City of Waterford.
- Citation: 7 Geo. 4. c. cxxxix

Dates
- Royal assent: 31 May 1826

Text of statute as originally enacted

Waterford and Limerick Railway Act 1845
- Act of Parliament
- Parliament of the United Kingdom
- Long title: An Act for making and maintaining a Railway from the City of Waterford to the City of Limerick, with Branches.
- Citation: 8 & 9 Vict. c. cxxxi

Dates
- Royal assent: 21 July 1845

The Limerick and Waterford Railway Act 1826 (7 Geo. 4. c. cxxxix) was passed by the Parliament of the United Kingdom on 31 May 1826 and had the distinction of being the first act authorising an Irish railway. No construction followed and it was 1845 before the Waterford and Limerick Railway was authorised by the Waterford and Limerick Railway Act 1845 (8 & 9 Vict. c. cxxxi), the first section of the line being opened from Limerick to Tipperary on 9 May 1848, the remainder of the main line being opened in stages, finally reaching Waterford in 1854.

== Secondary lines ==
The company eventually operated two long branch lines which extended from Limerick, north west to Sligo and south west to Tralee.

== Branch lines ==
By 1900, there were a number of branch lines:

- Ballingrane to Foynes, (opened by the Limerick and Foynes Railway 1858, purchased by the W&LR 1873)
- Killonan to Killaloe, (opened by the Limerick, Castleconnell and Killaloe Railway between 1858 and 1867, purchased by the W&LR 1873)
- Clonmel to Thurles, (opened by the Southern of Ireland Railway in 1880)
- Tralee to Fenit, an 8 miles (13 km) section opened in 1887 by the Tralee and Fenit Railway.

Waterford and Limerick Railway Act 1873
- Act of Parliament
- Parliament of the United Kingdom
- Long title: An Act to confer further powers on the Waterford and Limerick Railway Company in relation to their own Undertaking and the Undertakings of other Companies; and for other purposes.
- Citation: 36 & 37 Vict. c. clxxviii

Dates
- Royal assent: 21 July 1873

Text of statute as originally enacted

Under the Waterford and Limerick Railway Act 1873 (36 & 37 Vict. c. clxxviii) the W&LR took over the Limerick and Foynes Railway, the Rathkeale and Newcastle Junction Railway, the Limerick and Ennis Railway, the Athenry and Ennis Junction Railway, and the Athenry and Tuam Railway.

== People ==
The W&LR was generally short of cash to maintain rolling stock and most locomotive superintendents who were typically did not stay long. Incumbents included:

- Thomas Lunt, who came from the Liverpool and Manchester Railway and was in position from 1853 to 1857.
- Jonathan Pim, son for James Pim, locomotive superintendent from 1857 to 1861.
- Martin Atock was locomotive superintendent from 1861 until 1871.
- John G. Robinson was locomotive, carriage and wagon assistant superintendent of the railway from 1889 till 1900 when he moved to a similar position with the Great Central Railway.

== Amalgamation ==
Great Southern and Western, and Waterford, Limerick and Western Railways Amalgamation Act 1900
- Act of Parliament
- Parliament of the United Kingdom
- Long title: An Act for amalgamating the Waterford Limerick and Western Railway Company with the Great Southern and Western Railway Company and for other purposes.
- Citation: 63 & 64 Vict. c. ccxlvii

Dates
- Royal assent: 6 August 1900

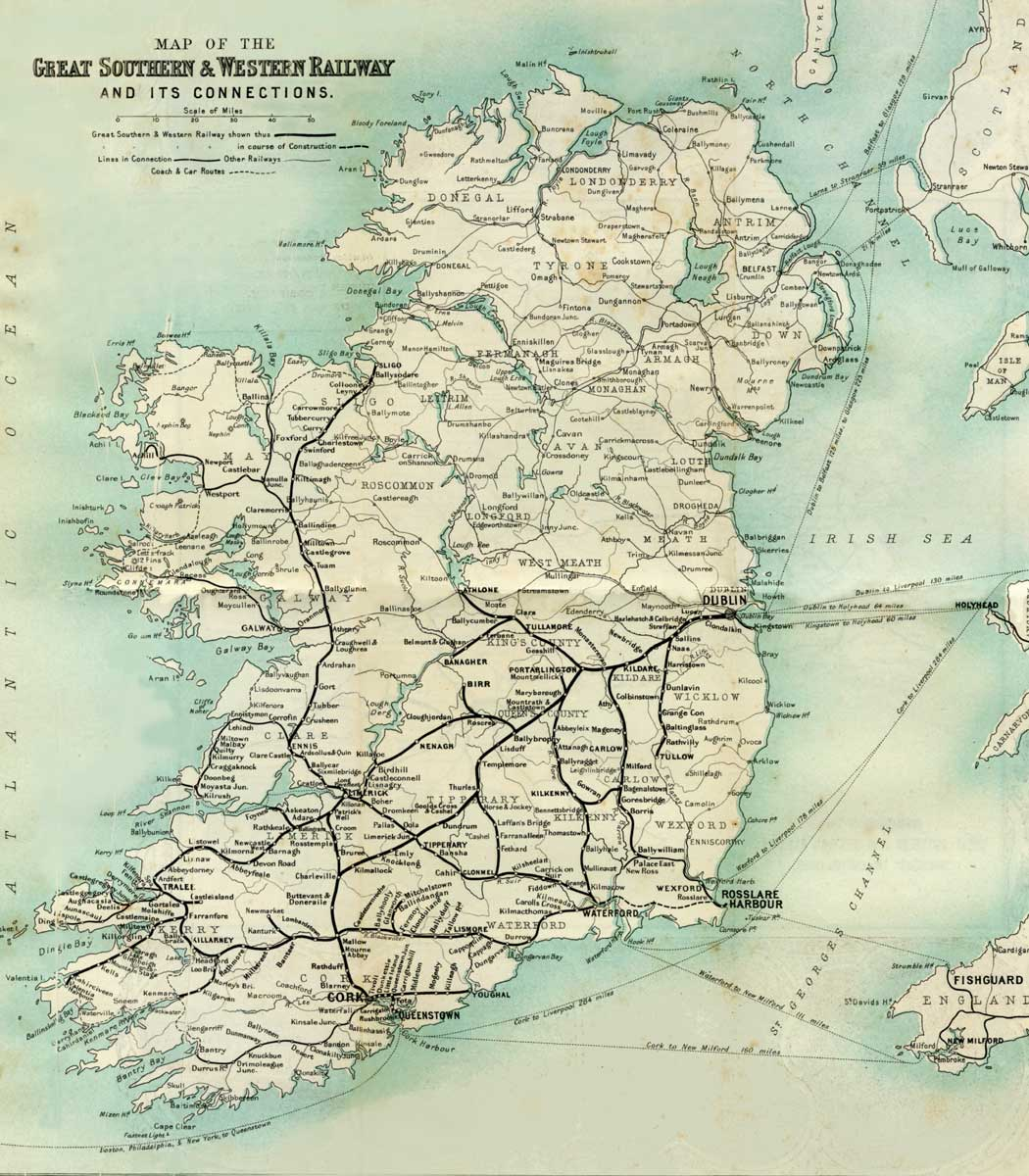
GSWR Ireland route map circa 1902 (thick black lines)

On 6 August 1900, the Great Southern and Western, and Waterford, Limerick and Western Railways Amalgamation Act 1900 (63 & 64 Vict. c. ccxlvii) was passed by the House of Commons and the WL&WR finally lost its independence on 1 January 1901.

== Livery ==
The WL&WR locomotives were painted a medium green until 1876 and was replaced by a brown livery with blue and yellow lining. In the late 1880s, J.G. Robinson introduced a crimson lake livery with gold lining for both passenger locomotives and coaching stock, very close to that of the Midland Railway of England. Goods engines were painted black with red and white lining.

== Present day ==
The former WL&WR lines operational in 2010 are owned by Iarnród Éireann. The main line route from Limerick to Waterford and the line to Ennis remain open to passenger traffic. The extension of the line from Ennis to Athenry (for Galway) was officially re-opened on 29 March 2010. These lines are part of the Western Railway Corridor.

== See also ==
- History of rail transport in Ireland
- Rail transport in Ireland
- Iarnród Éireann

== Sources ==
- Ahrons, E. L. (1954). L. L. Asher (ed.). Locomotive and train working in the latter part of the nineteenth century. Vol. six. W Heffer & Sons Ltd.
- Casserley, H.C. (1974). Outine of Irish Railway History. Newton Abbot: David & Charles. ISBN 0715363778.
- Fryer, C.E.J. (2000). The Waterford & Limerick Railway. The Oakwood Press. ISBN 0-85361-543-8.
- Shepherd, Ernie (2009). The Atock/Attock Family: A Worldwide Railway Engineering Dynasty. Vol. 150. Oakwood Library of Railway History. ISBN 978-0853616818.
