= Foynes =

Port town in County Limerick, Ireland

Foynes Faing (Irish)
- Town
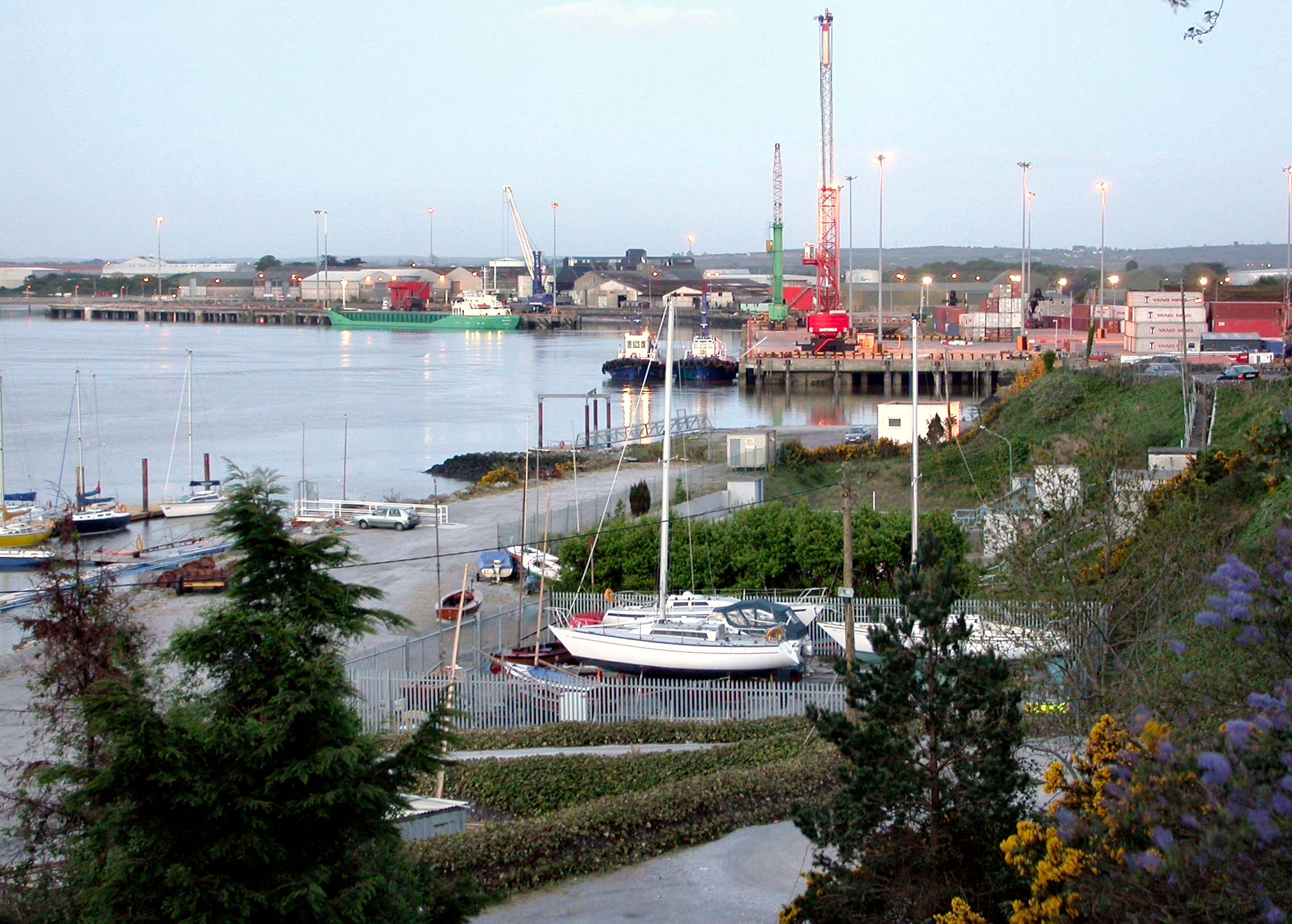
- Foynes Harbour

- Location in Ireland
- Coordinates: 52.611°N 9.107°W
- Country: Ireland
- Province: Munster
- County: County Limerick
- Elevation: 3 m (9.8 ft)

Population (2022)
  - Total: 512
- Irish Grid Reference: R251512

Foynes (/ˈfɔɪnz/; Irish: Faing) is a town and major port in County Limerick in the midwest of Ireland, located at the edge of hilly land on the southern bank of the Shannon Estuary. The population of the town was 512 as of the 2022 census.

== Foynes's role as seaport ==
Foynes as a port has a long history, being first surveyed in 1837, and is now the location of a major deep water seaport operated by the Shannon Foynes Port Company, an amalgamation under the Harbours Act 2000 of the agencies operating the ports of Limerick and Foynes with the Shannon Estuary Ports Company (which had responsibility for the other areas of the Estuary). Shannon Foynes Port Company is the second largest port facility in Ireland, handling over 10 million tonnes of cargo annually through the six terminals currently operational. Planning permission has been granted for an LNG import terminal at Ballylongford, County Kerry, within SFPC's jurisdiction; once constructed it will add considerably to throughput.

As Limerick portlands are redeveloped as commercial and residential properties, it is anticipated that more traffic will be diverted to Foynes Port. The railway line from Limerick via Patrickswell and Raheen is being rebuilt. Iarnród Éireann's former policy of concentrating on what it saw as more profitable passenger operations meant the Port's traffic is, up to year 2026, entirely served by road.

== Foynes's role in aviation ==
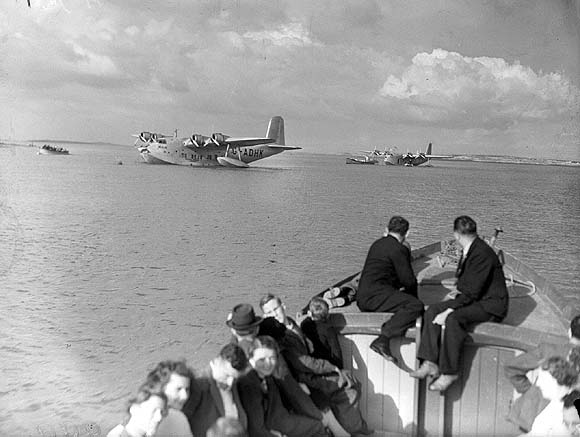
Seaplanes at Foynes, July 1938

During the late 1930s and early 1940s, land-based planes lacked sufficient flying range for Atlantic crossings. Foynes was the last port of call on the Atlantic's eastern shore. Operation of seaplanes made Foynes become one of the biggest civilian airports in Europe during World War II.

Surveying flights for flying boat operations were made by Charles Lindbergh in 1933 and a terminal was begun in 1935. The first transatlantic proving flights were operated on 5 July 1937 with a Pan Am Sikorsky S-42 service from Botwood, Newfoundland on the Bay of Exploits and a BOAC Short Empire service from Foynes with successful transits of twelve and fifteen-and-a-quarter hours respectively. Services to New York, Southampton, Montreal, Poole and Lisbon followed, the first non-stop New York service operating on 22 June 1942 in 25 hours 40 minutes.

Flying boat use diminished fast following the opening in 1942 of Shannon Airport on flat bogland on the northern bank of the Shannon River estuary. Foynes flying-boat station closed in 1946.

While Irish Coffee is claimed to have been invented in San Francisco, it was made popular in that city a decade after it had been first invented at Foynes in 1943 when the Brendan O'Regan's chef and bartender, Joe Sheridan, was asked to make something hot for passengers whose flying boat had turned back due to bad weather. O'Regan was Catering Comptroller between 1943-1945 and afterwards held the same position at Shannon Airport where he established the world's first duty-free shop amongst his innovations.

=== Foynes Flying Boat Museum ===
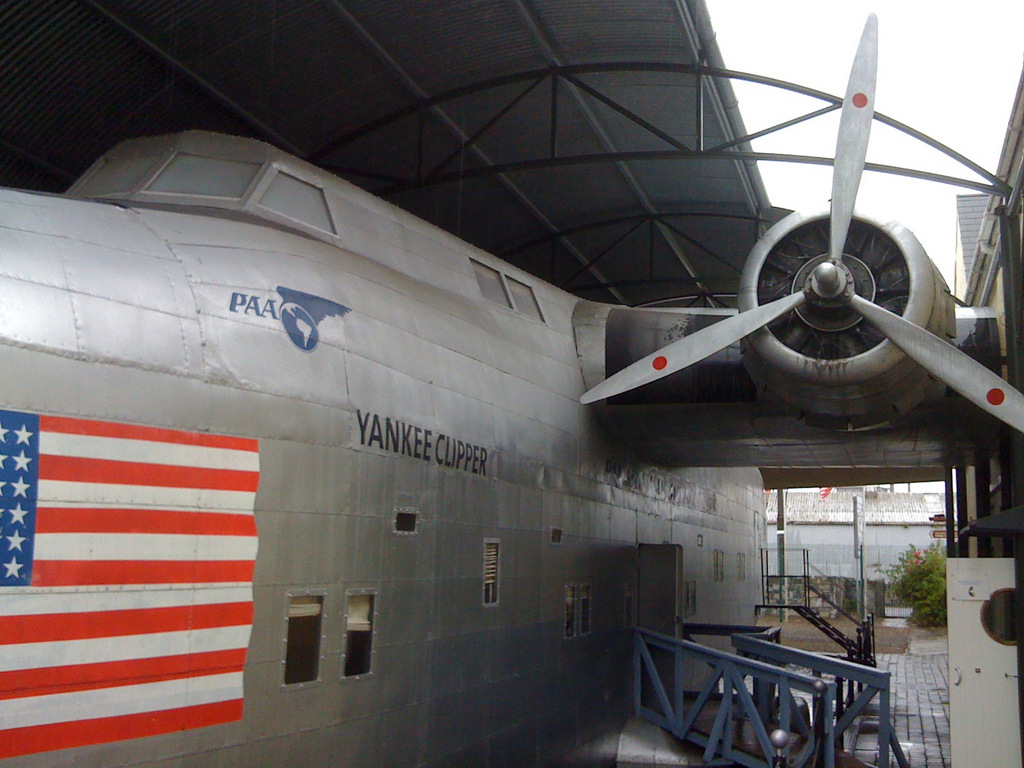
A full-size replica of a Boeing 314 flying boat.

A college for the learning of the Irish language was opened in the former seaplane terminal in 1954. The Port Trustees purchased the building in 1980 and the Foynes Flying Boat Museum leased a portion in 1988. The museum contains much memorabilia from that era, including the original radio and weather room, along with its equipment and a full-size replica Boeing 314 flying boat.

== Transport ==
=== Rail ===
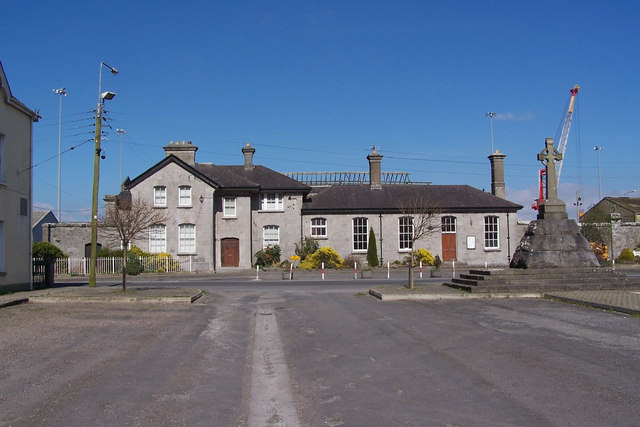
Foynes railway station building in 2005

Foynes railway station opened on 29 April 1858, as the terminus of a line from Limerick which was subsequently extended west from Ballingrane to Tralee. The station closed to passengers on 4 February 1963, but remained open for freight traffic until 30 October 2000. The Limerick–Foynes railway line was "mothballed" at the end of 2001 (the line from Ballingrane to Tralee having been lifted in the late 1980s). The annual Irish Rail weed-spraying train last traversed the line on 7 May 2002.

The Shannon Foynes Port Company reportedly maintained contact with Irish Rail to discuss reopening the line for bulk cargo projects and, in April 2011, the company's chairman said that they were confident that the rail link could be reopened. In June 2015, €800,000 of EU funding was secured for a study to develop the business case to reopen the line. In early 2023, it was announced that a contractor had been appointed and works on reopening the line were due to commence in February 2023.

=== Bus ===
Bus Éireann route number 314 provides a few journeys a day to Limerick via Askeaton. In the opposite direction, there are buses to Glin with a weekend service to Tralee and a summer service to Ballybunion.

== Places of interest ==
In addition to the Foynes Flying Boat Museum, the Knockpatrick Gardens, an award-winning 3-acre (12,000 m^{2}) garden overlooking the Shannon Estuary, is located 2 km (1 mi) from Foynes.

Foynes is near to Adare, a national heritage town, and the city of Limerick. The main gateway to the region is Shannon Airport. Foynes is located on the N69 "coast road" to Tarbert and Tralee in County Kerry.

== Sports ==
Saint Senan's GAA club draws its players from the parish centred on Foynes and the neighbouring town of Shanagolden. Although it has fielded hurling teams on occasions, it is primarily a Gaelic football club. After winning the intermediate championship in 2003, Saint Senan's were narrowly beaten in the final of the 2006 Limerick Senior Football Championship. Its predecessor, the Foynes team, won its only senior championship in 1907.

== See also ==
- List of towns and villages in Ireland.
