= Limerick–Foynes railway line =

Former railway line in Ireland

Limerick–Foynes line
- Freight train at Foynes station in 1988

Overview
- Other name: Foynes branch
- Status: Undergoing testing before recommisioning
- Owner: Irish Rail
- Locale: County Limerick
- Termini: Limerick Colbert; Foynes
- Stations: 7 (1 open)

Service
- Operator: Irish Rail

History
- Opened: 29 April 1858
- Closed to passengers: 4 February 1963
- Closed: November 2000

Technical
- Line length: 42 km (26 mi)
- Num of tracks: 1
- Track gauge: 5 ft 3 in (1,600 mm) Irish gauge

The Limerick to Foynes Railway is a 42-kilometre (26 mi) railway line in County Limerick, Ireland that connects the city of Limerick with the port of Foynes. The line was closed for a period of 25 years from 2000, but was rebuilt between 2022 and 2026 at a cost of €151.5 million. As of October 2026, the line was expected to re-open for freight services during 2027.

== History ==
=== Construction and development ===
Limerick and Foynes Railway Act 1853
- Act of Parliament
- Parliament of the United Kingdom
- Long title: An Act for making a Railway from Limerick to Foynes.
- Citation: 16 & 17 Vict. c. clxviii

Dates
- Royal assent: 4 August 1853

Text of statute as originally enacted

Limerick and Foynes Railway Act 1855
- Act of Parliament
- Parliament of the United Kingdom
- Long title: An Act to increase the borrowing Powers of the Limerick and Foynes Railway Company.
- Citation: 18 & 19 Vict. c. lxxviii

Dates
- Royal assent: 26 June 1855

Text of statute as originally enacted

Limerick and Foynes Railway Act 1858
- Act of Parliament
- Parliament of the United Kingdom
- Long title: An Act to afford Facilities to the Limerick and Foynes Railway Company for raising the Funds necessary to enable them to execute their Undertaking.
- Citation: 21 & 22 Vict. c. xciii

Dates
- Royal assent: 12 July 1858

Limerick and Foynes Railway Act 1861
- Act of Parliament
- Parliament of the United Kingdom
- Long title: An Act to enable the Limerick and Foynes Railway Company to raise further Sums.
- Citation: 24 & 25 Vict. c. xcix

Dates
- Royal assent: 28 June 1861

Limerick and Foynes Railway Act 1870
- Act of Parliament
- Parliament of the United Kingdom
- Long title: An Act to authorise the Limerick and Foynes Railway Company to cancel certain authorised but unissued preference shares, and to borrow on mortgage in lieu thereof, and to issue debenture stock; and for other purposes.
- Citation: 33 & 34 Vict. c. lix

Dates
- Royal assent: 20 June 1870

Text of statute as originally enacted

The railway was authorised by the Limerick and Foynes Railway Act 1853 (16 & 17 Vict. c. clxviii), and opened in April 1858 by the Limerick and Foynes Railway, which was taken over by the Waterford and Limerick Railway under the Waterford and Limerick Railway Act 1873 (36 & 37 Vict. c. clxxviii).

Initially there was no direct access to the line from Limerick station, with the line branching off at Limerick Check signal cabin. As part of the Cork and Limerick Direct Railway, authorised by the Cork and Limerick Direct Railway Act 1860 (23 & 24 Vict. c. c) and operated by the Great Southern and Western Railway, a direct line was built in 1862. Construction of a 3 miles (4.8 km) branch to the cement factory at Castlemungret begun in September 1956, with the line opening on 1 October 1957.

=== Closure ===
No passengers were carried on the Castlemungret branch, and the line to Foynes closed to passengers on 2 February 1963. While goods trains continued to run, and increased traffic to Castlemungret resulted in a second track being built between Limerick Check and the junction to the factory, the direct curve into Limerick Colbert was closed and lifted in September 1975. However, ground frames connecting the Castlemungret and Foynes lines were removed in the 1980s, leaving the lines operationally separate.

Goods trains to Foynes ceased in November 2000, and in May 2002 the last train, a weed sprayer, moved on the line. The line was disconnected from the broader Irish Rail network at Limerick Check in November 2007. Goods trains to Castlemungret continued until 2009, with the branch finally being disconnected in 2013.

=== Reopening proposals ===
Since the line's closure in 2000, a number of proposals were made to reopen the line. In December 2018, Irish Rail sought permission to replace the unsafe Robertstown viaduct for the potential reintroduction of freight traffic with a new, single-span structure, removing the viaduct in 2023. The railway line is part of the EU Trans-European Transport Network (TEN-T) infrastructure, and in 2015 the Shannon Foynes Port Company received €800,000 to study the feasibility of reinstating the line.

=== Reopening ===
In July 2022, Irish Rail published a tender to contract for the rebuilding of the line. These works had reportedly commenced by mid-November 2022. In early 2023, it was announced that the tender contract had been agreed, with works on reopening the line due to commence in February 2023. In September 2023, the River Maigue bridge at Adare was removed for restoration and repair.

By May 2024, the old jointed track on wooden sleepers had been removed, and laying of new concrete sleepers and rails had commenced on the route. The new track will be welded to form continuous welded rail. In November 2024, it was reported that the track laying was "expected to be largely completed" by the end of 2024.

By November 2025, all track along the 42km route had been re-laid, and bridges over the River Maigue and River Deel had been renovated, along with the installation of a new 46m span bridge to replace the old Robertstown Viaduct. Also completed were ancillary works including the closure and upgrades of user worked level crossings, drainage works, boundary fencing, and the installation of signalling and telecoms infrastructure. Works yet to be completed by that date included the completion of the signalling and telecoms systems, the connection of the Foynes line with the rest of the rail network at Limerick, and the reinstatement of 13 public road level crossings with CCTV monitored crossings.

The reconstruction of the line was completed in October 2026 at a cost of €151.5 million, with test trains running on the line late that month, representing the first trains to run on the line in 25 years. Driver training is set to commence once it is commissioned, and freight services are expected to begin in the first half of 2027.
