= List of historic properties in Douglas, Arizona =

- City
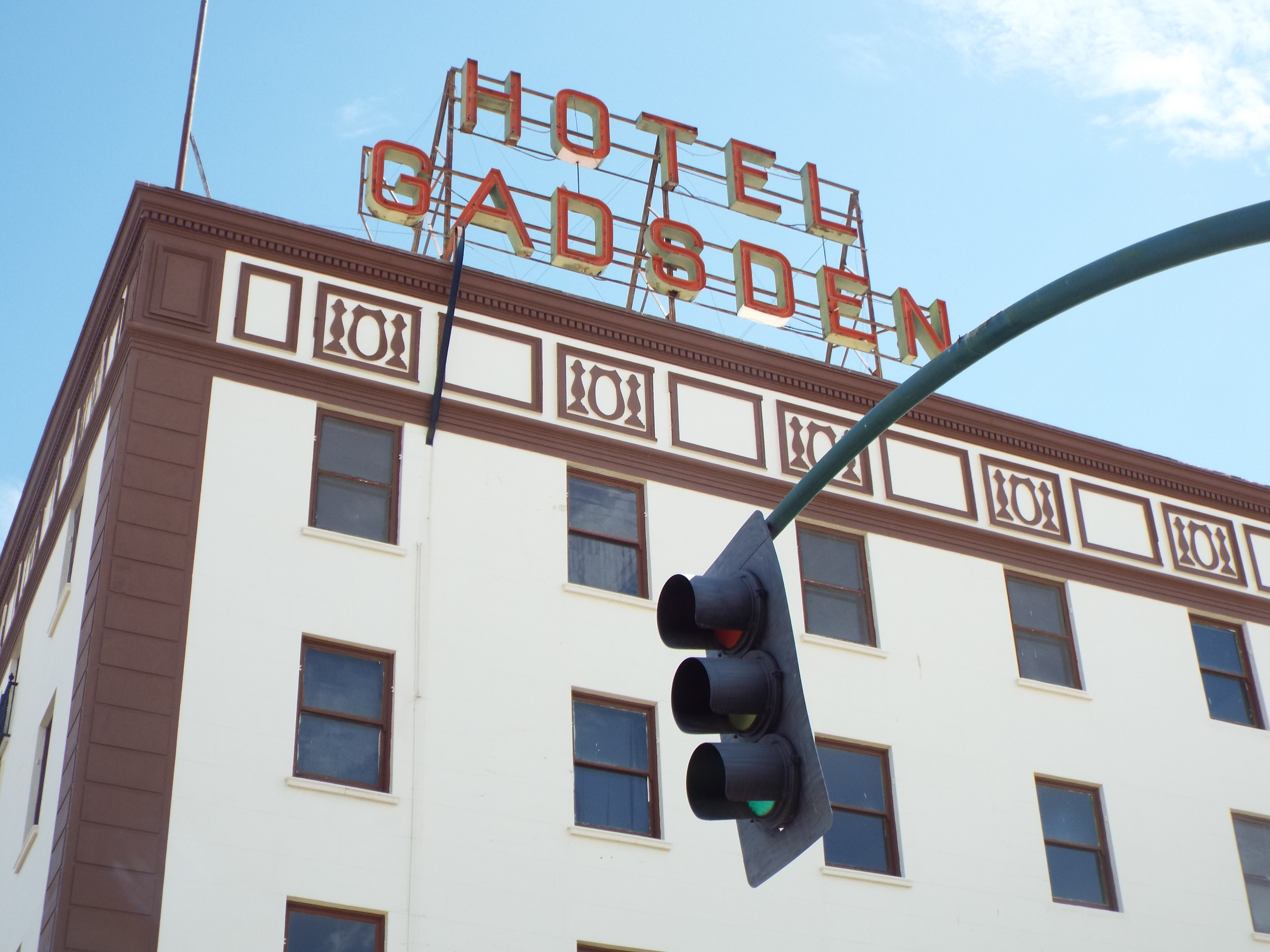
- Hotel Gadsden

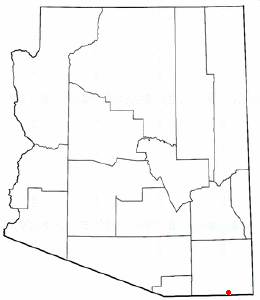
- Location of Douglas in Arizona
- Coordinates: 31°20′42″N 109°32′29″W

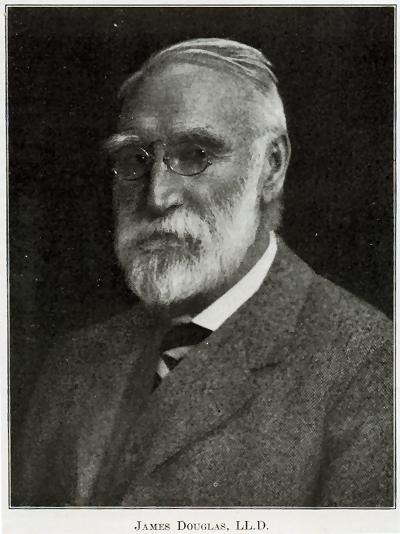
Dr. James Douglas

This is a list, which includes a photographic gallery, of some of the remaining historic buildings, houses, structures and monuments in Douglas, Arizona, a city in Cochise County. There are various historic structures in Douglas which are located in G Street known as the Douglas Historic District. Some of the structures are individually listed in the National Register of Historic Places (NRHP). Douglas has three more historical districts besides the Douglas Historic District. The other three historic districts are the Douglas Residential Historic District, the Douglas Sonoran Historic District and the Rucker Canyon Archeological District.

== Brief history ==
Native-Americans inhabited the area where the City of Douglas and its surrounding areas are located before the arrival of the people of European ancestry from the East Coast of the United States. The principal Native-American tribe which inhabited southeastern Arizona were the Chiricahua Apaches. They called themselves the Chiricahua Apache (Apache: `great mountain’) after their former mountain home in southeast Arizona. Their own name true name is actually the Aiaha.

In the 1500s Spain claimed the area which they called New Spain, In 1535, Spanish explorer Cabeza de Vaca established a route from Mexico through the southwestern region of Arizona. Spanish Conquistadores then began to establish presidios throughout the region. Present-day Douglas is close to the San Bernardino Presidio of the late 1700s. In 1821, the Mexican War of Independence between Mexico and Spain came to an end and the territory of New Spain, which included present-day Arizona, was ceded to Mexico.

By the mid-1800s there were many cattle ranchers in the region, among them John Horton Slaughter. In 1854, the United States purchased the region from Mexico in what is known as the Gadsden Purchase. Americans of European descent from the East Coast of the United States began to arrive in the area. Some came to work as miners and others came to establish farms and ranches which provided food to the growing population.

The Phelps Dodge Corporation selected the area as a suitable site to establish a smelter for its copper mines in Bisbee. In 1888, mining pioneer Dr. James Douglas founded the Arizona and South Eastern Railroad. By 1901, the railroad line covered Bisbee, Fairbanks, Benson and finally Douglas. That same year the line was renamed the "El Paso and Southwestern Railroad".The town was founded in 1901 and was named after Dr. James Douglas. Two copper smelters operated at the site; the Calumet and Arizona Company Smelter and the Copper Queen.

Douglas was incorporated in 1905. It shares a border with the town of Agua Prieta, Mexico. In 1911, during the conflict known as the Border War, a United States Army camp, Camp Harry J Jones was established. During the Mexican Revolution the United States Army established Camp San Bernardino Ranch a.k.a. the Slaughter Ranch Outpost to deal with the border troubles.

There are many properties listed in the National Register of Historic Places and Historic landmarks in Douglas. Among them the Hotel Gadsden, the Southern Pacific Railroad Depot, the Grand Theatre and the first international airport in the United States. The Douglas area is also home to many cattle ranches, including the historical Slaughter Ranch. The Douglas-Williams House/Museum houses a comprehensive photographic collection, which chronicles much of the city's historic past.

== Douglas Arizona Historical Society ==
According to the Douglas Historical Society, their mission is to promote research and education about the history of Douglas, Arizona. To acquire, protect, and preserve property, both real and personal having historical significance and value. A property may be listed in the National Register of Historic Places or it may be eligible to be listed as such, however, that does not mean that the property is safe from being demolished by its owner. According to Jim McPherson, Arizona Preservation Foundation Board President:

"It is crucial that residents, private interests, and government officials act now to save these elements of our cultural heritage before it is too late."

An example is the Douglas Underpass which was located on U.S. Route 80 under Southern Pacific railroad tracks at milepost 366.1. The underpass was built in 1936 as a part of the Works Projects Administration. It was listed in the National Register of Historic Places on September 30, 1988, reference: #88001609. Yet, the underpass was demolished in 1999.

== Historic structures ==
The following is a brief description of some of the historic structures in Douglas.

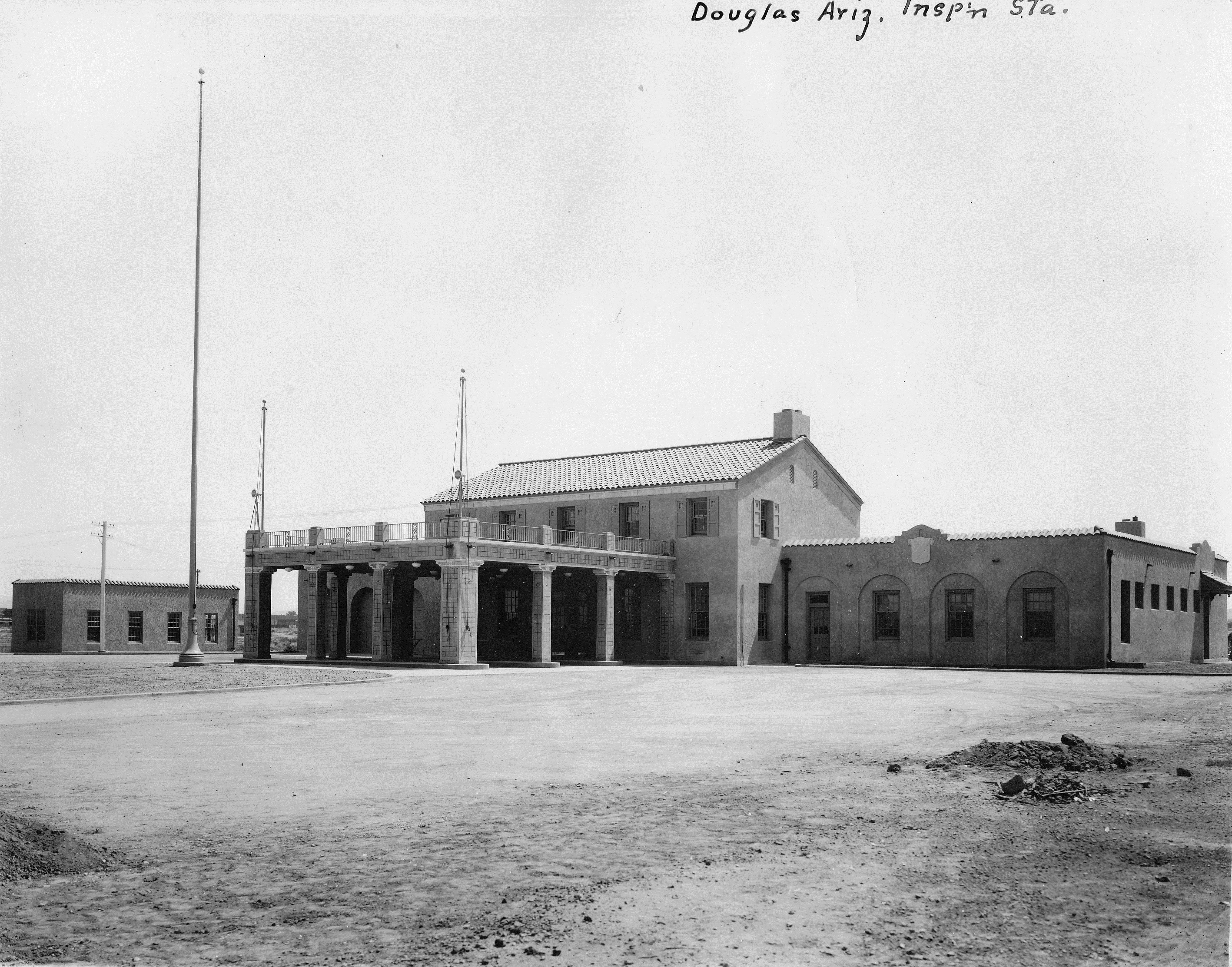
Douglas, Arizona border station as seen in 1933

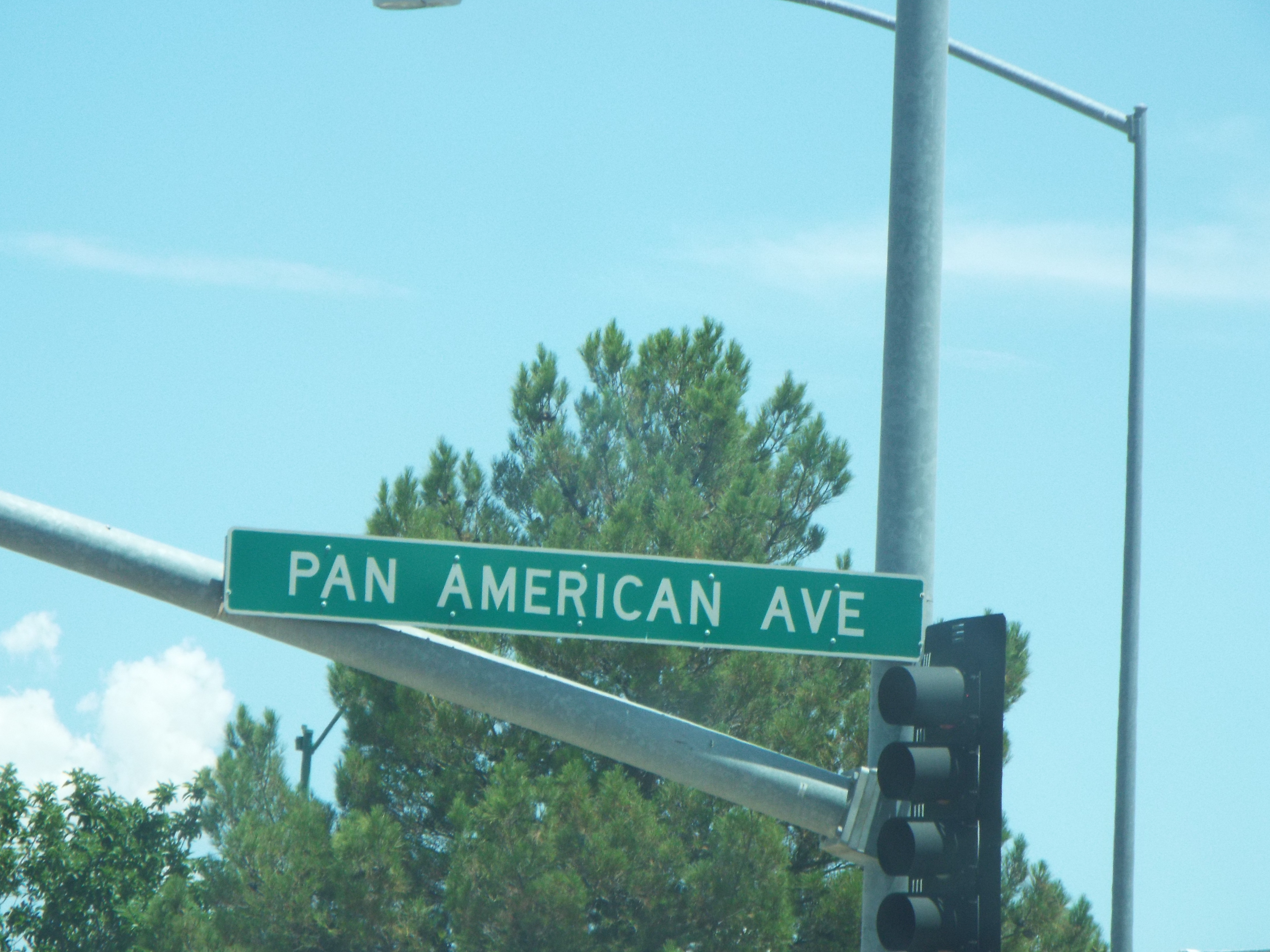
Pan American Avenue

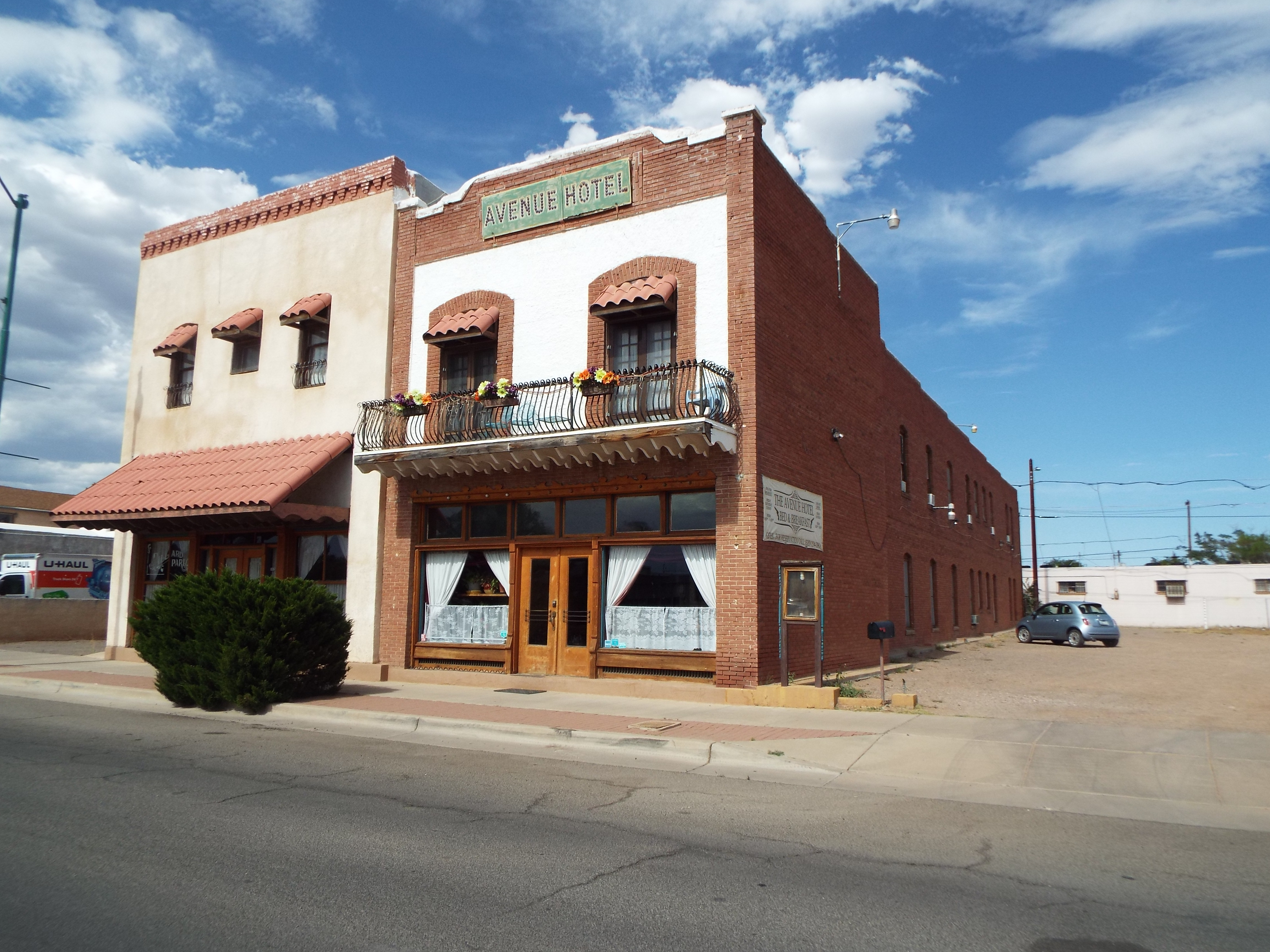
Avenue Hotel and addition in G Street

- Douglas Municipal Airport – Established in 1928 and located at the eastern end of 10th Ave. The Douglas Municipal Airport, was the first international airport in the United States. The airport was also the home to World War II military pilot training and housed Amelia Earhart on a cross-country flight. Listed in the National Register of Historic Places on December 30, 1975, reference: #75000336.
- El Paso and Southwestern Railroad Passenger Depot – built in 1913 and 14th St. and H Ave. Listed in the National Register of Historic Places on April 16, 1986, reference: #86000792.
- El Paso and Southwestern Railroad YMCA 1000 Pan American Ave. The building is a Mission Revival style one designed by architect Theodore C. Link. The main two-story portion was built in 1905. It has a one-story addition which was added in 1918 . Listed in the National Register of Historic Places on March 1, 1984, reference: #84000647.
- Grand Theatre – built in 1919 and located at 1139-1149 G. Ave. The Beaux Arts-style building was considered one of the most deluxe entertainment venues in the Southwest and played host to vaudeville performers. Listed in the National Register of Historic Places on July 30, 1976, reference: #76000372.
- United States Post Office and Customs House–Douglas Main – designed in 1912 and built in 1915 and located at 601 10th St. The building also serves as a custom house and with Federal offices. Listed in the National Register of Historic Places on December 3, 1985, reference: #85003104.
- Brophy Building – built in 1907 and located at 1046 G Avenue. Built by William H. Brophy, in partnership with James Douglas, founder and president of Phelps-Dodge. It is also a historically important structure because of its association with Dr. James Douglas and Brophy, two of Douglas’ founding fathers and leading figures.
- Hotel – built in 1901 and located at 401 9th Street in the Douglas Historic District.
- Commercial Building – built in 1905 and located at 1113 G Avenue in the Douglas Historic District.
- Masonic Lodge Building – built in 1907 and located at 930 G Avenue in the Douglas Historic District.
- Avenue Hotel – built in 1901 and located at 1401 G Avenue in the Douglas Historic District. The original north half of the hotel is an authentic adobe building that was built in 1901 by the Douglas Land and Improvement Co. In 1915 the southern half of the building, made of brick, was extended into what it is today. In its prime, the hotel was primarily a place to stay for railroad workers. It was renamed the "Raul Hector Castro Port of Entry" in 2015. Listed in the National Register of Historic Places on May 22, 2014, reference: #14000242.
- Douglas Underpass – It was listed in the National Register of Historic Places on September 30, 1988, reference: #88001609. However, it was demolished in 1999.

== Historic structures pictured ==
The following are the images of the historic structures in Douglas.

Historic Structures

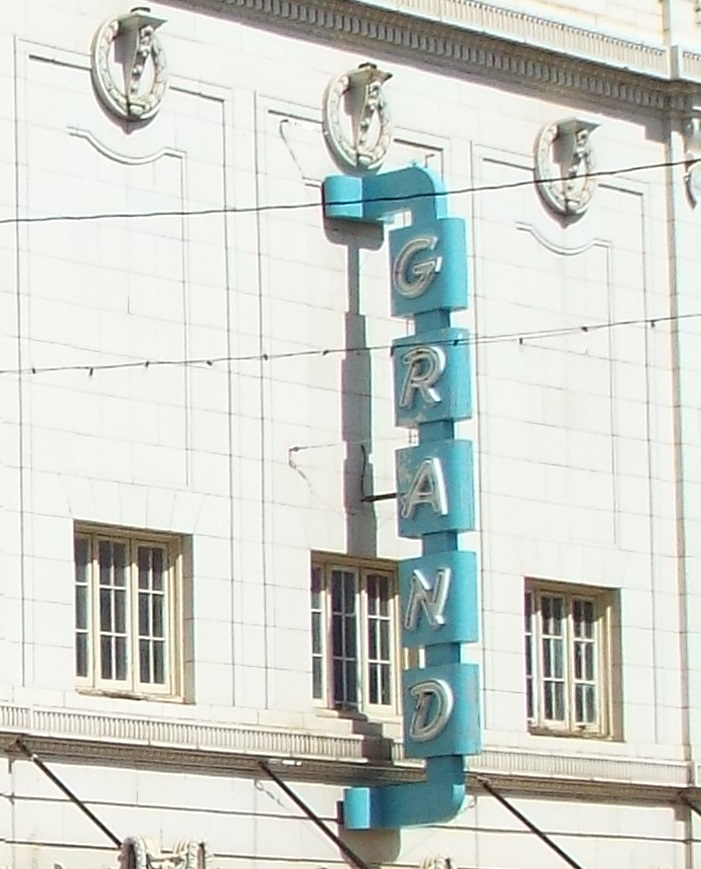
Grand Theatre-1919

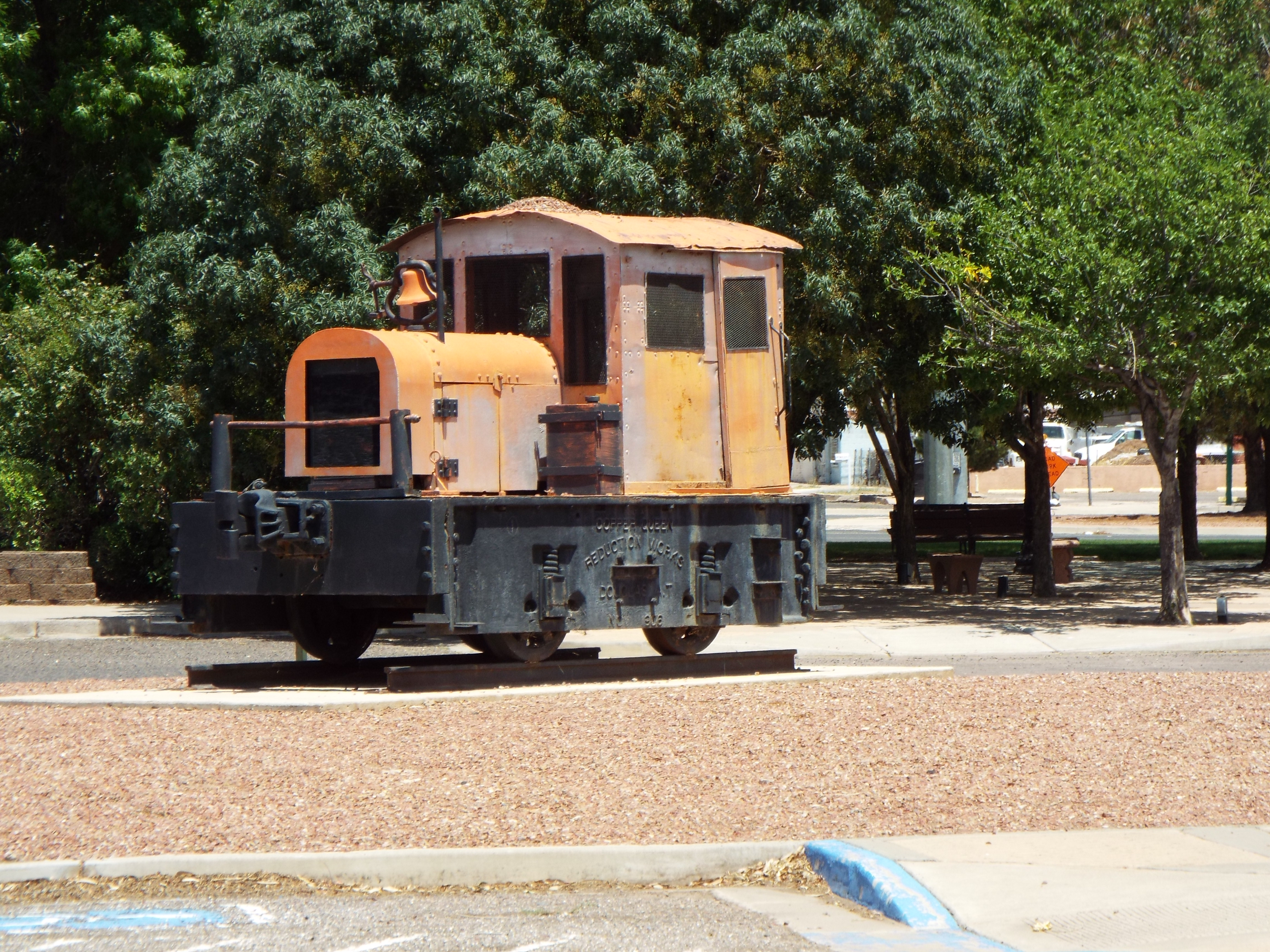
A 1906 Dinky Motor built by the Copper Queen Reduction Works.

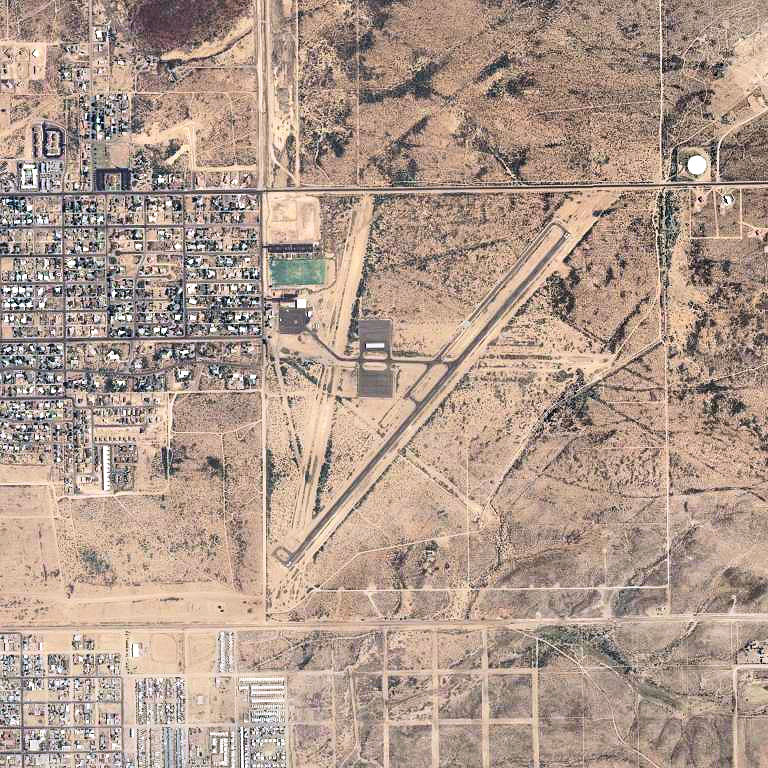
Douglas Municipal Airport

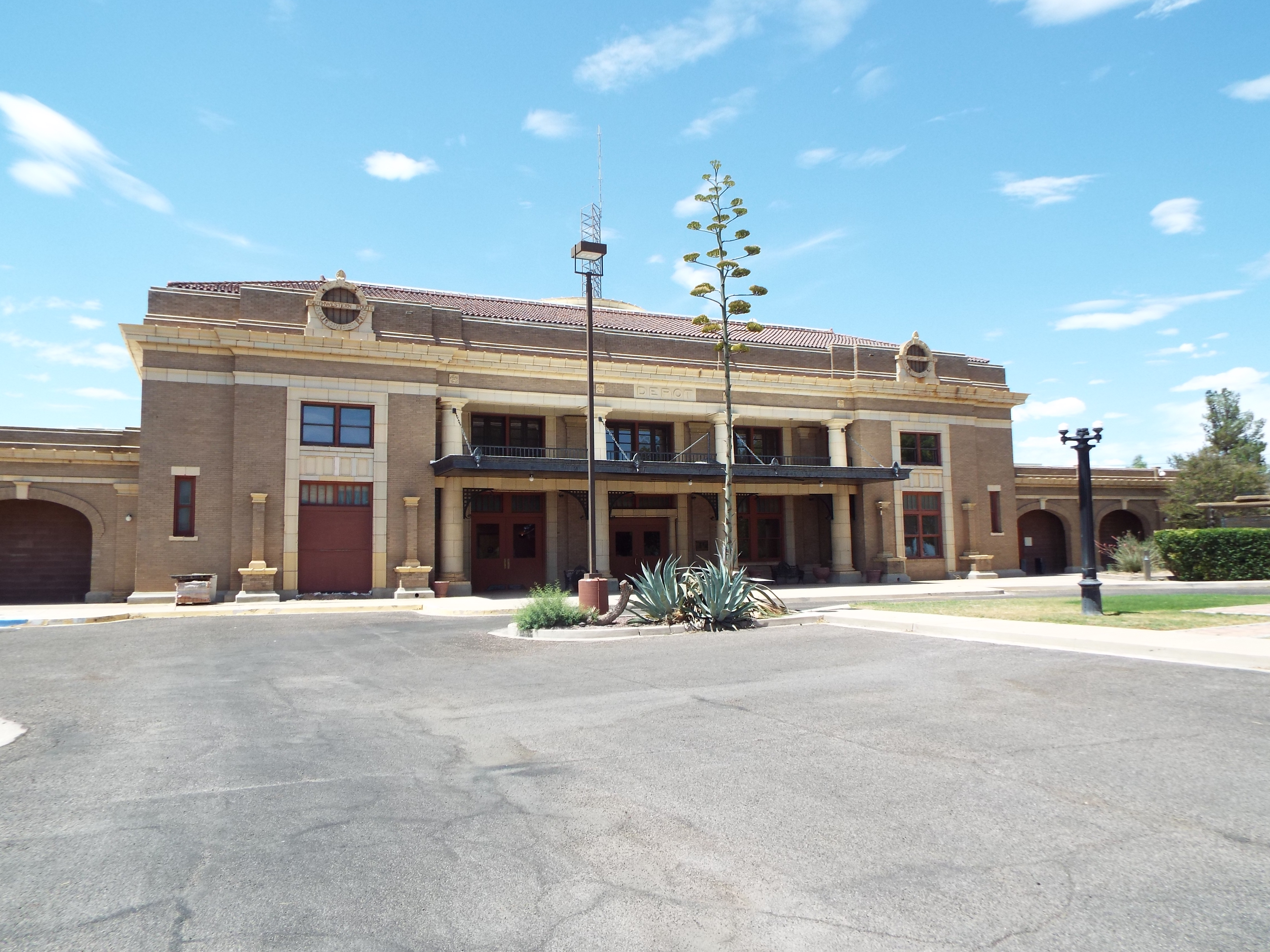
El Paso and Southwestern Railroad Passenger Depot – 1913

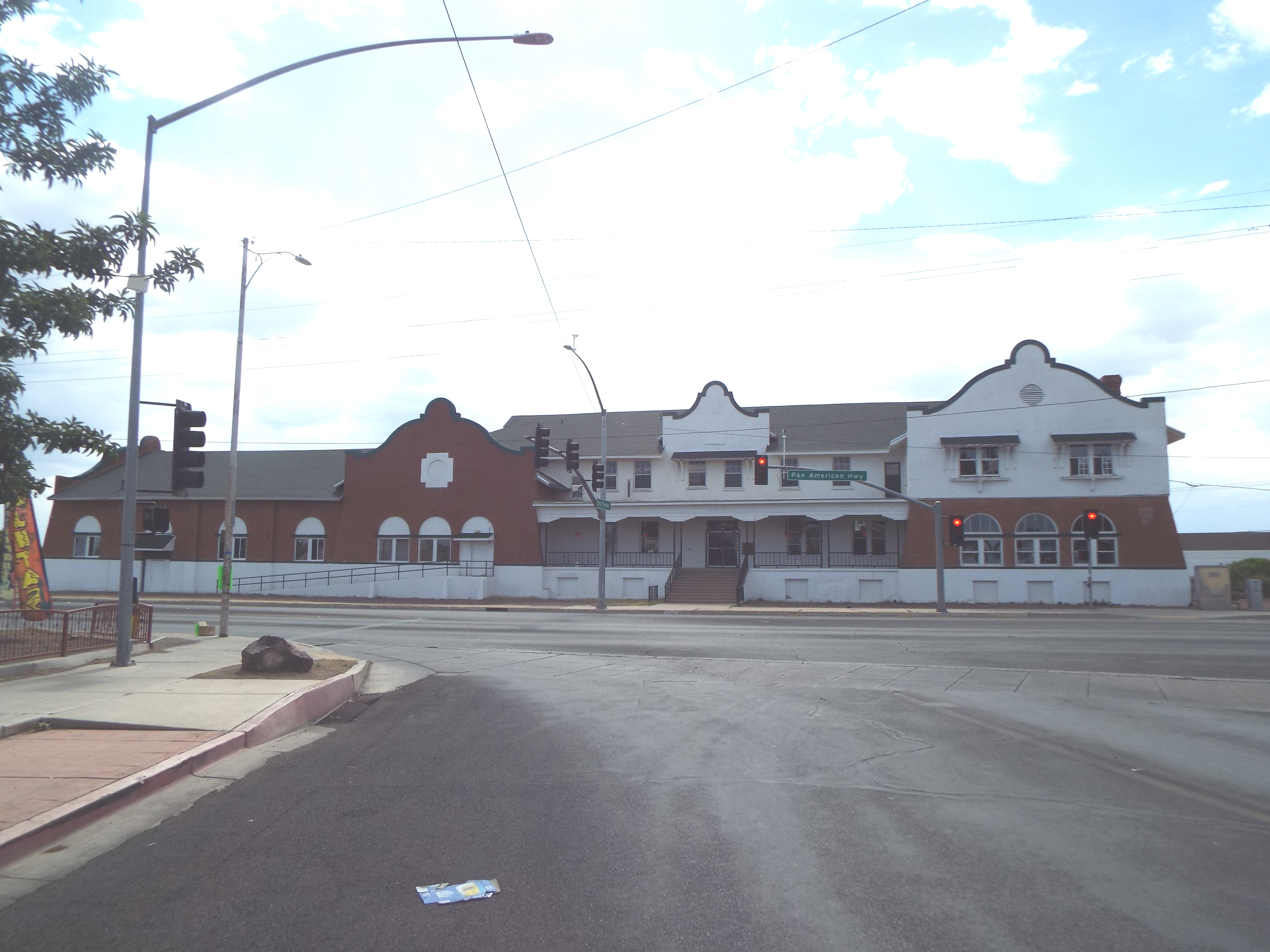
El Paso and Southwestern Railroad YMCA – 1905

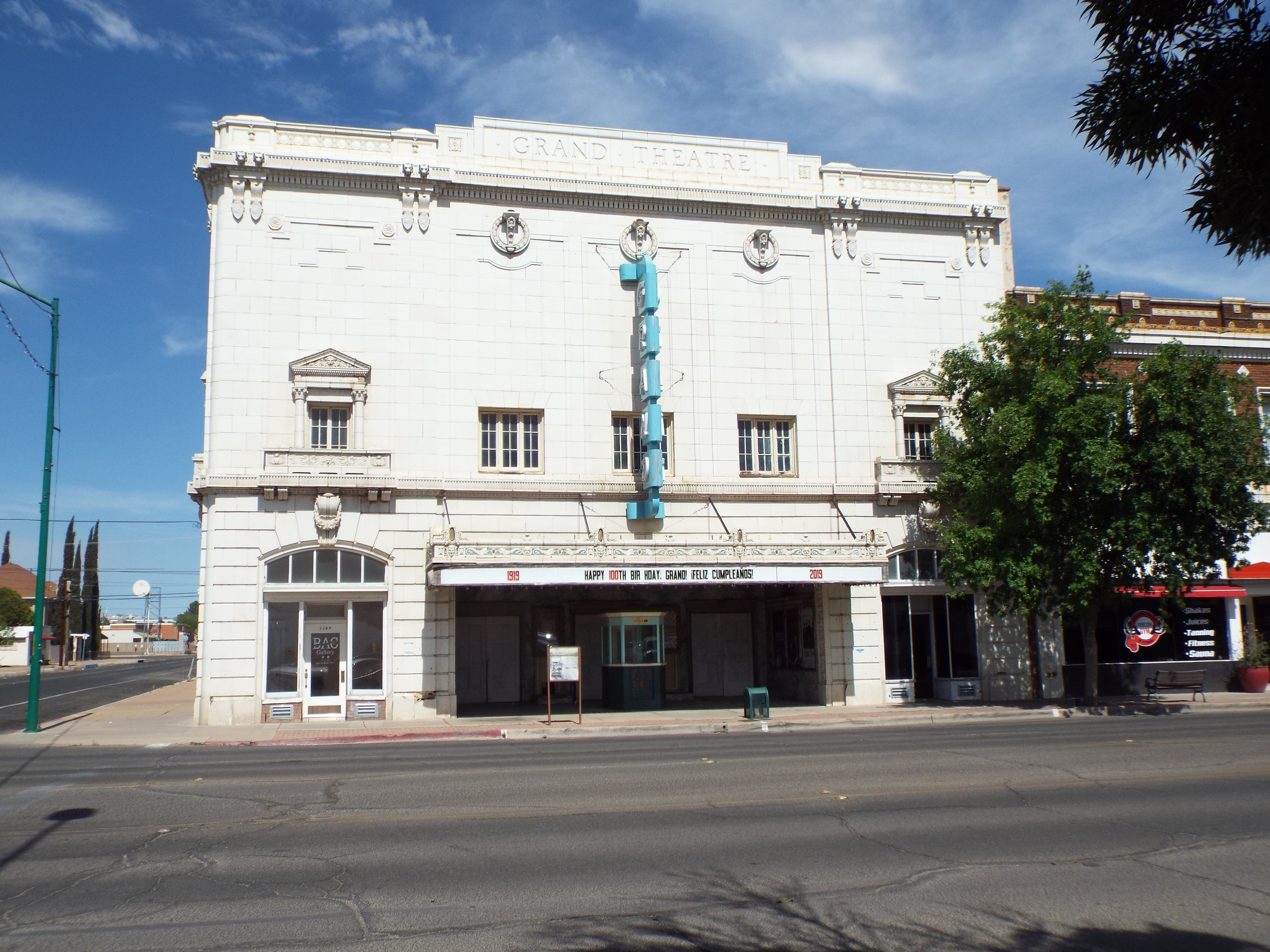
Grand Theatre – 1919

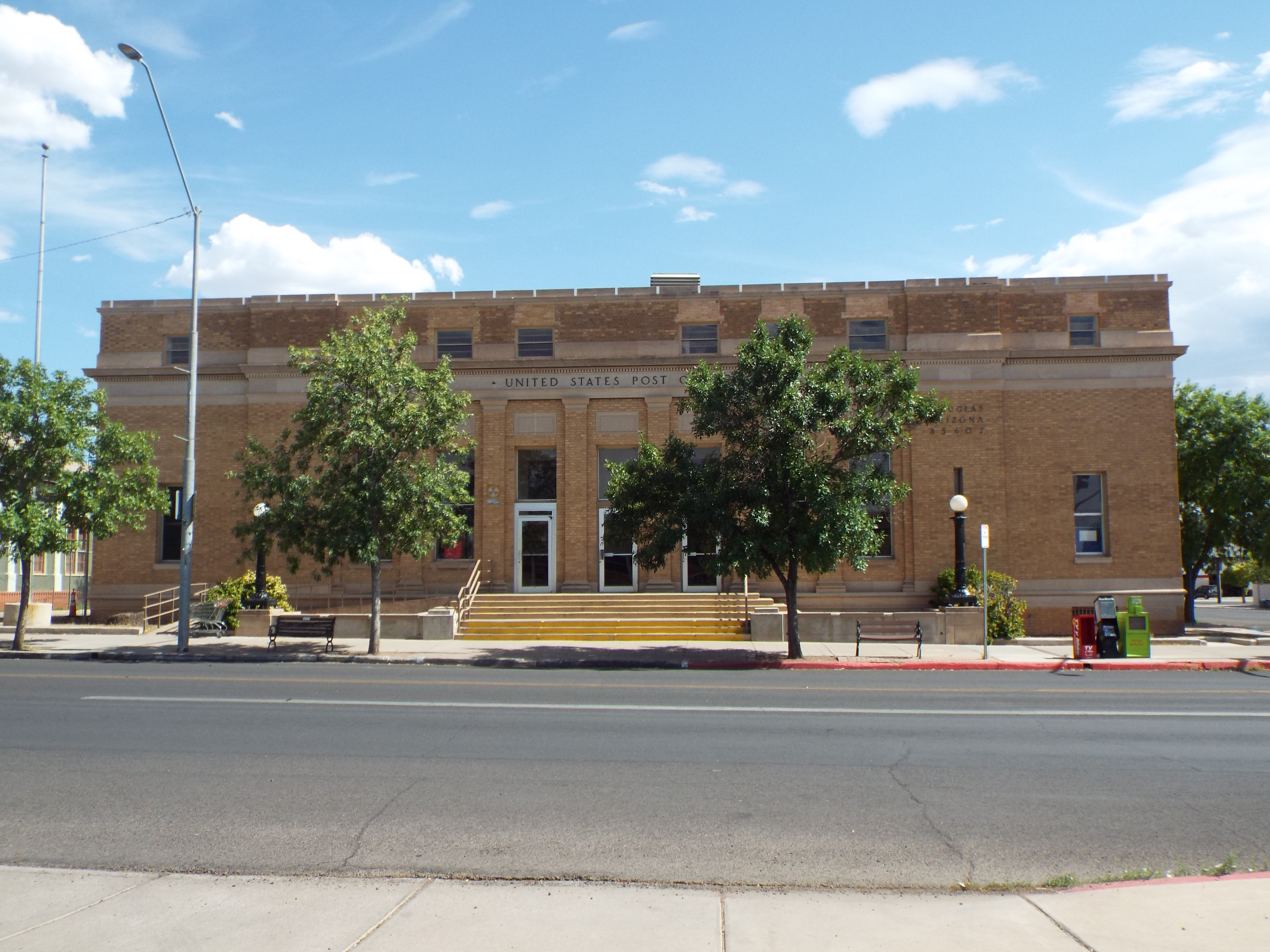
US Post Office and Customs House – 1915

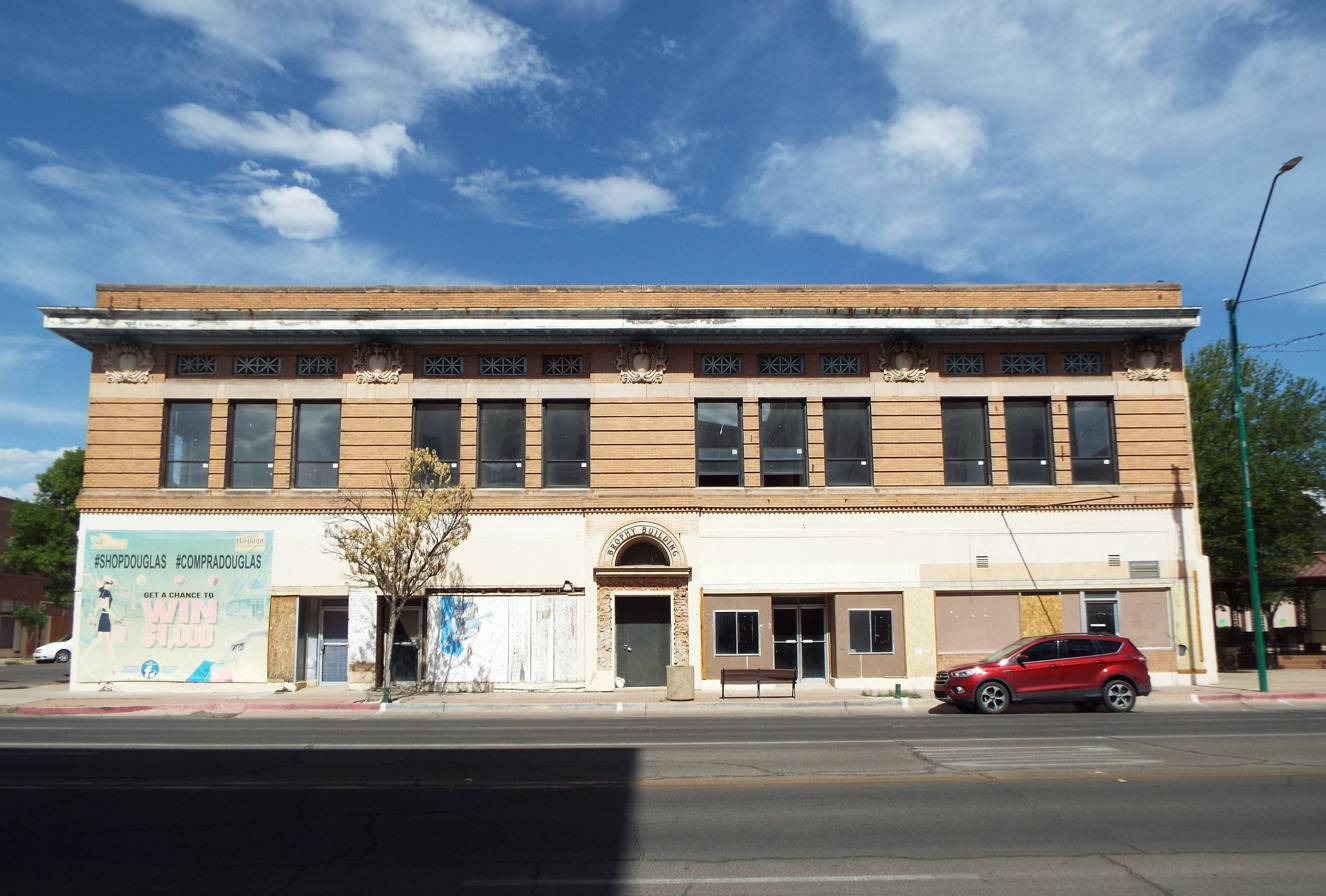
Brophy Building – 1907

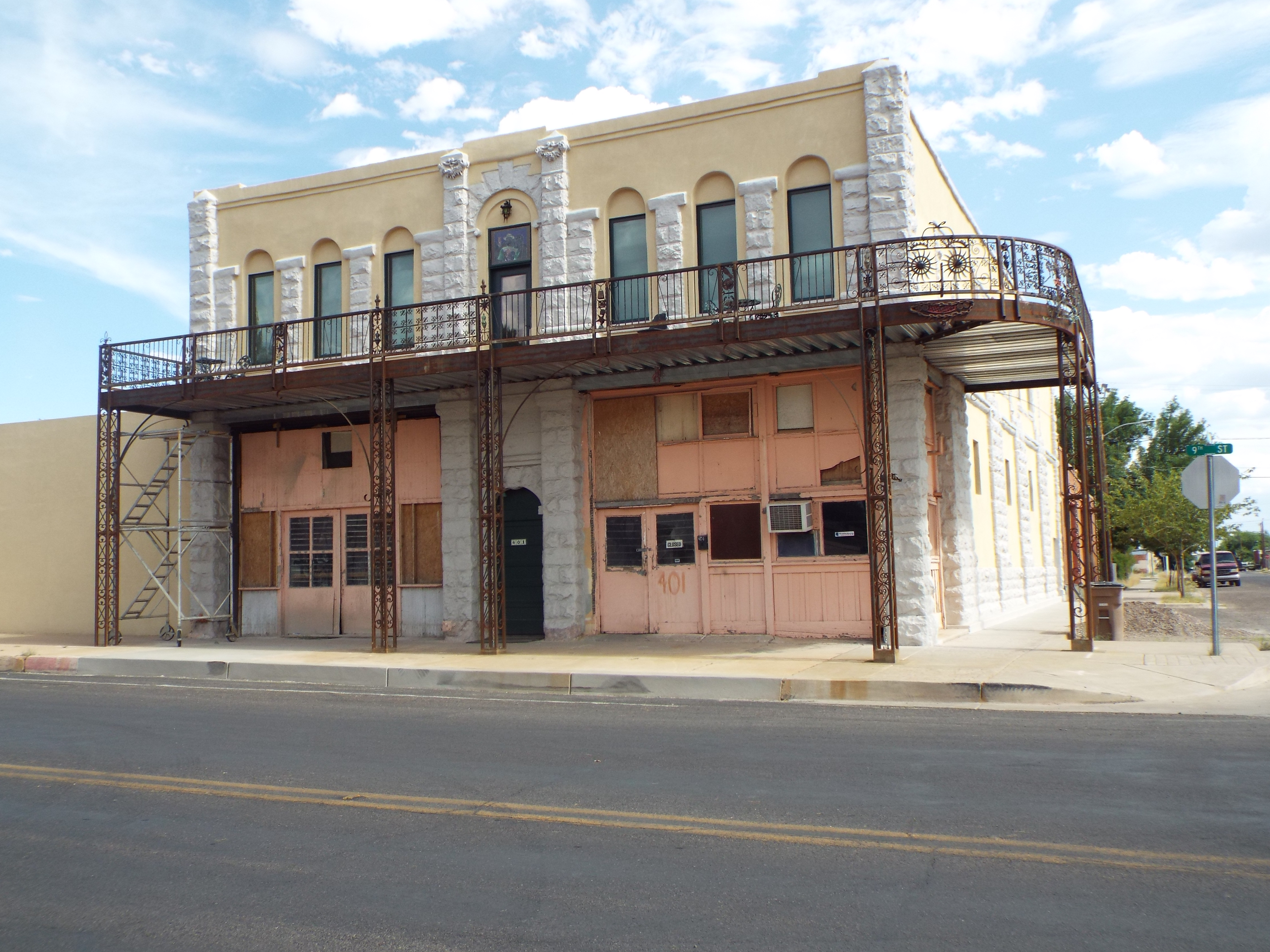
Hotel on 9th Street – 1901

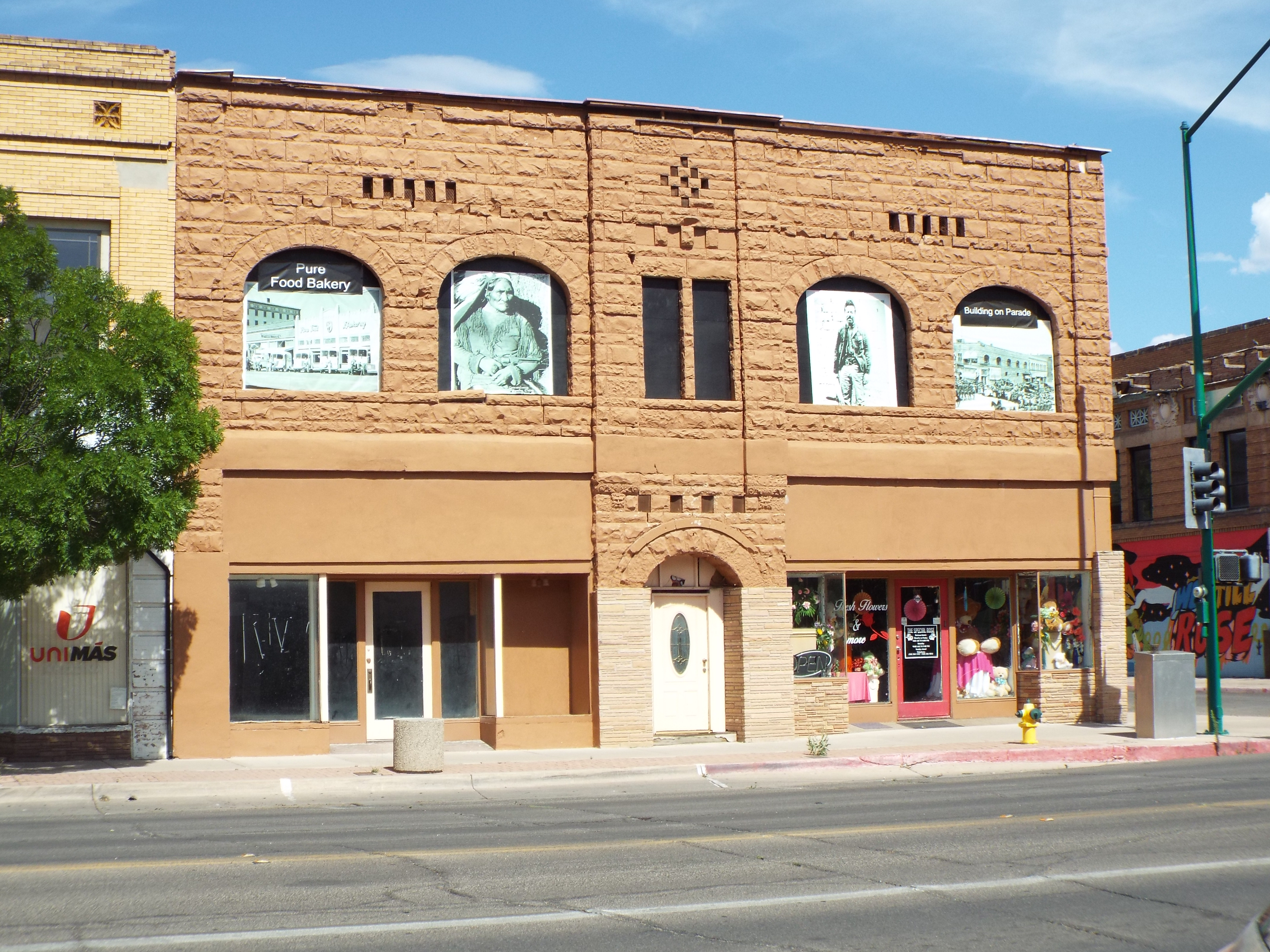
Commercial Building – 1905

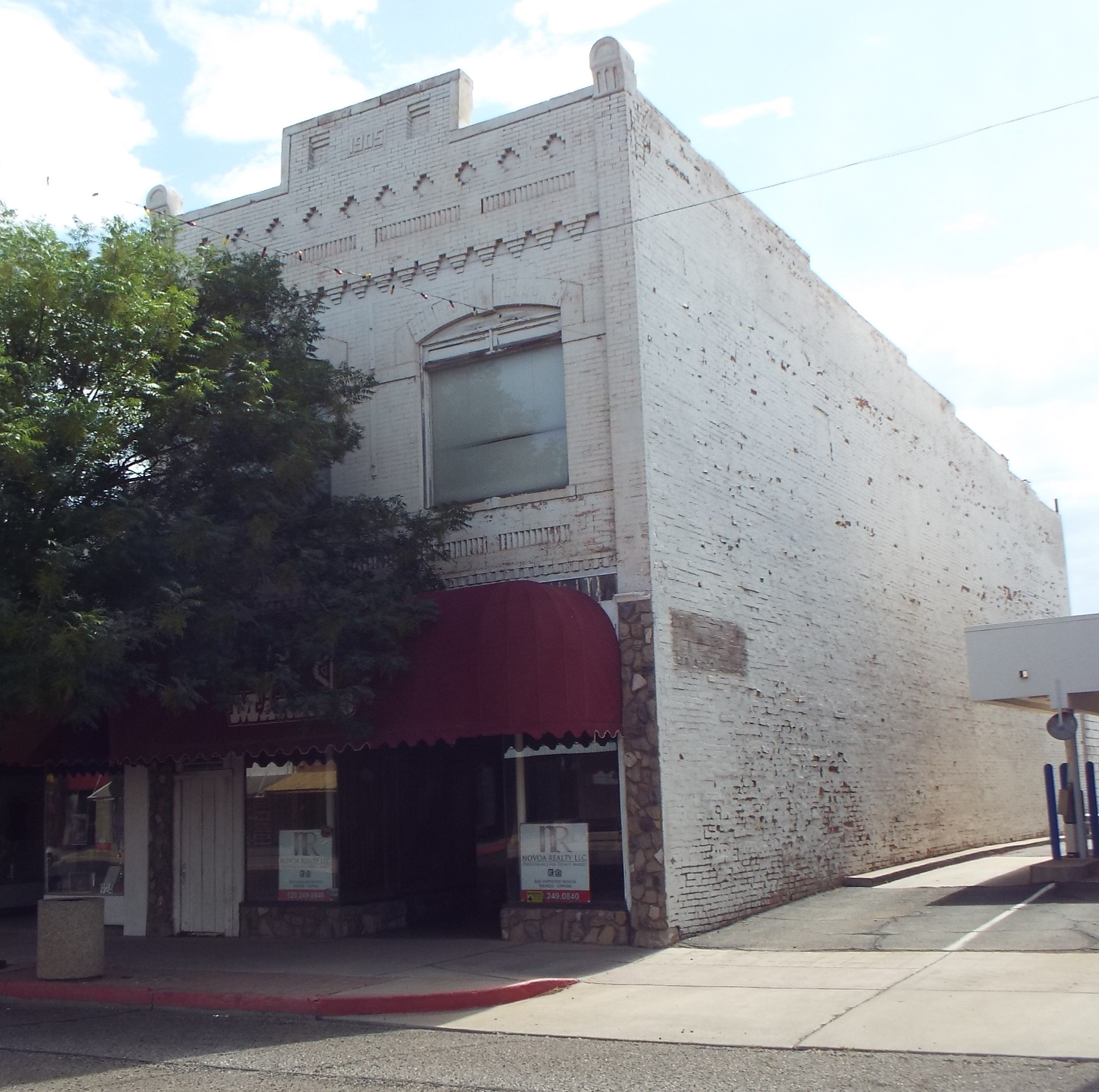
Masonic Lodge Building – 1907

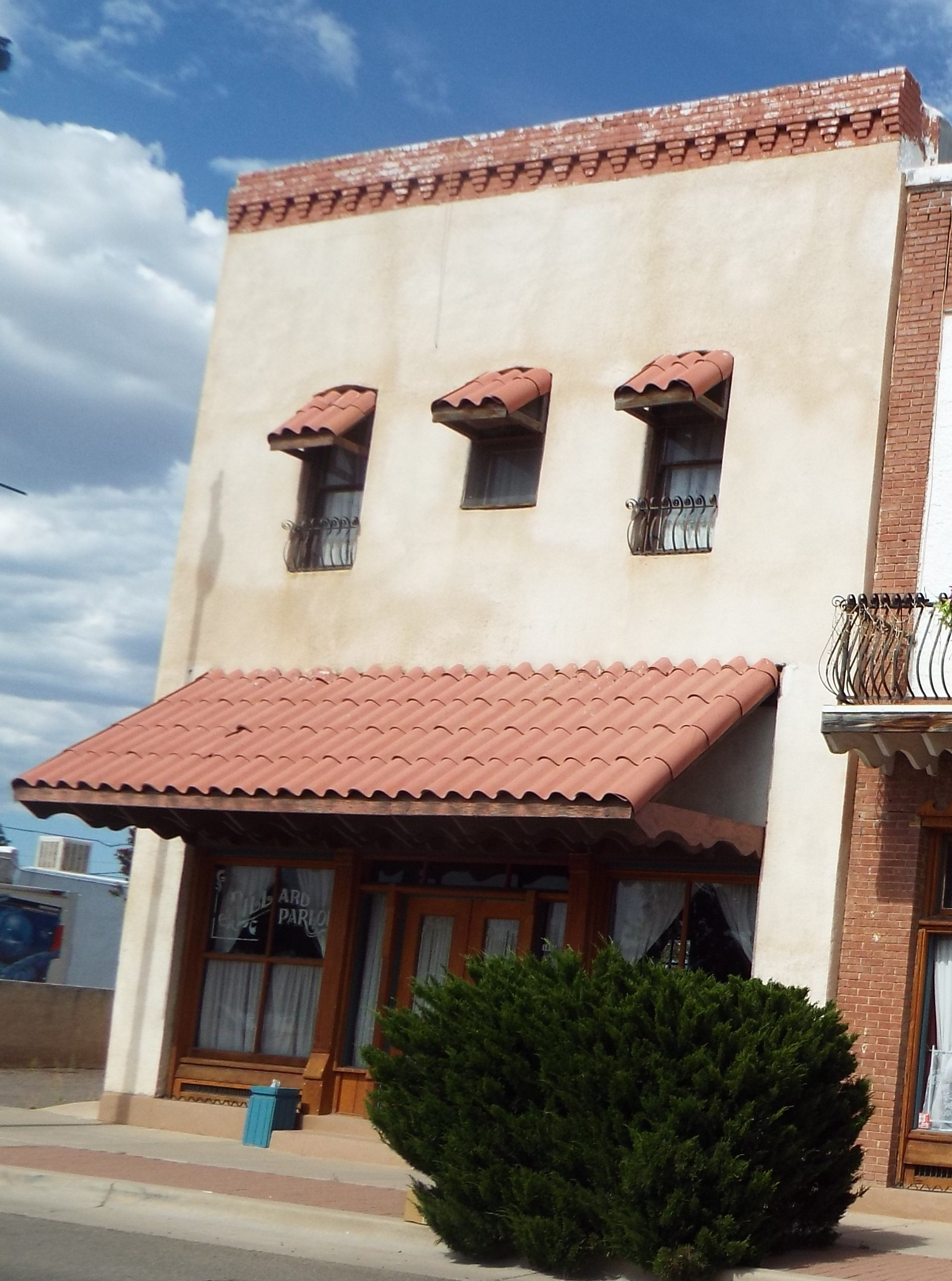
Avenue Hotel – 1901

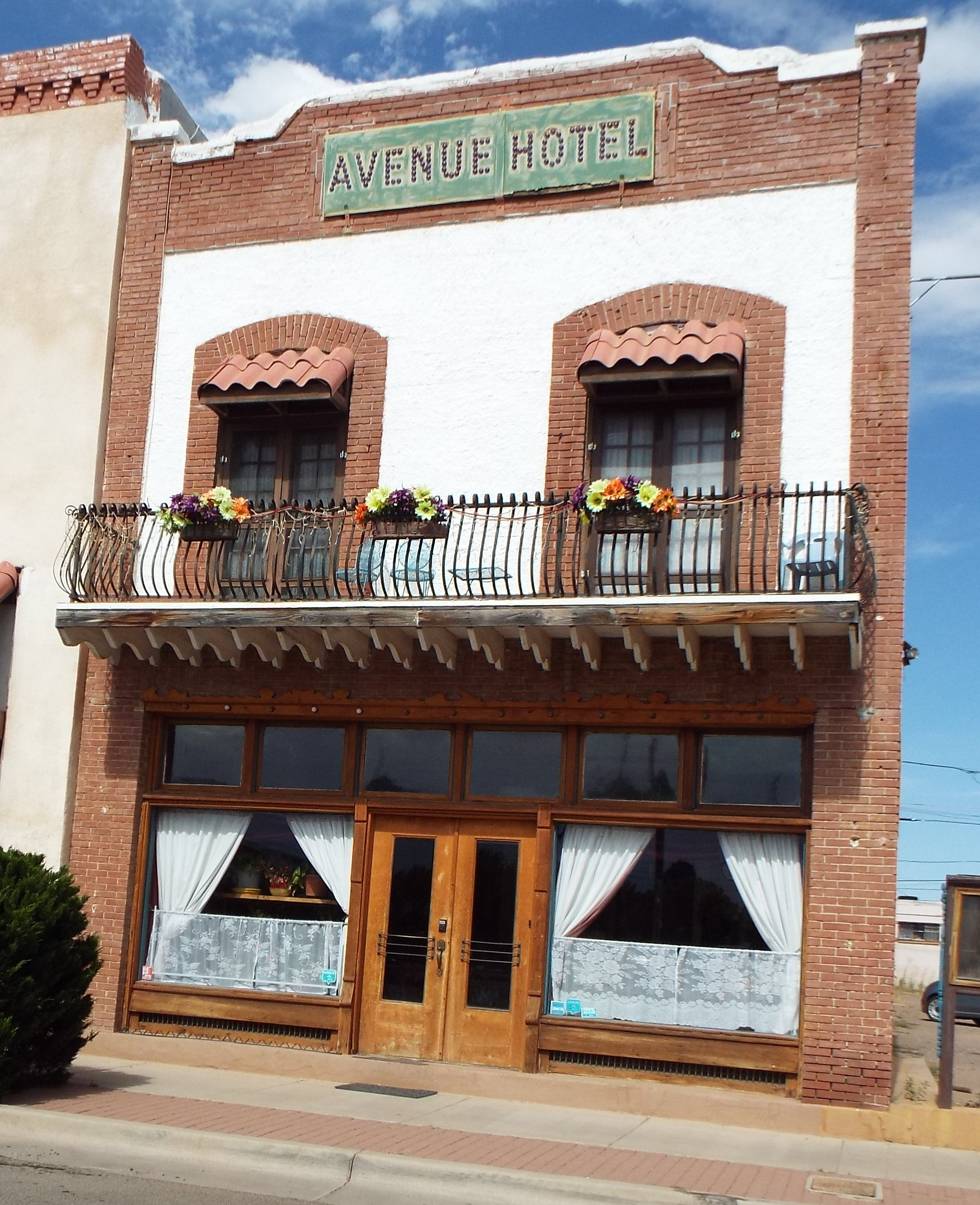
Avenue Hotel addition – 1904

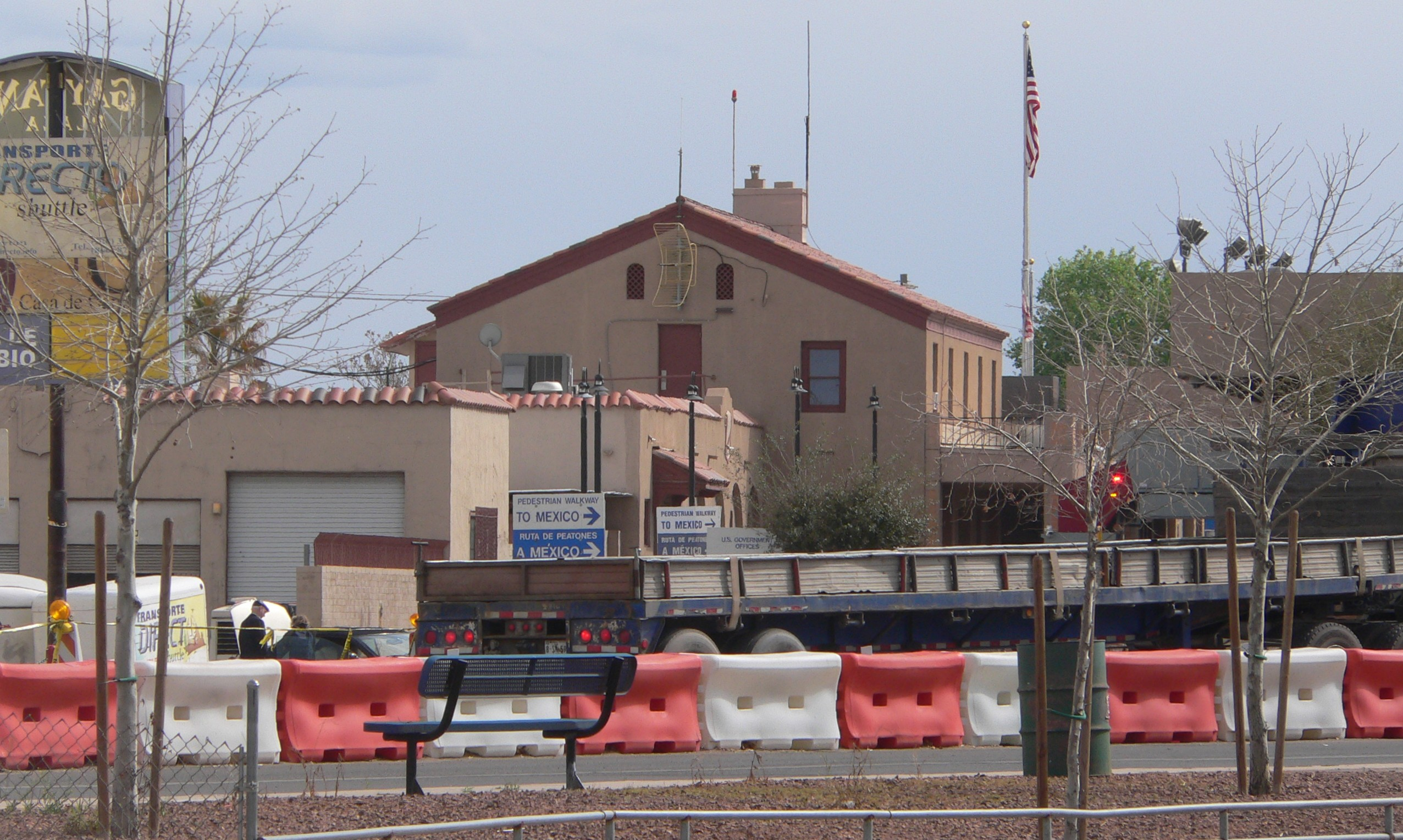
U.S. Inspection Station – 1933

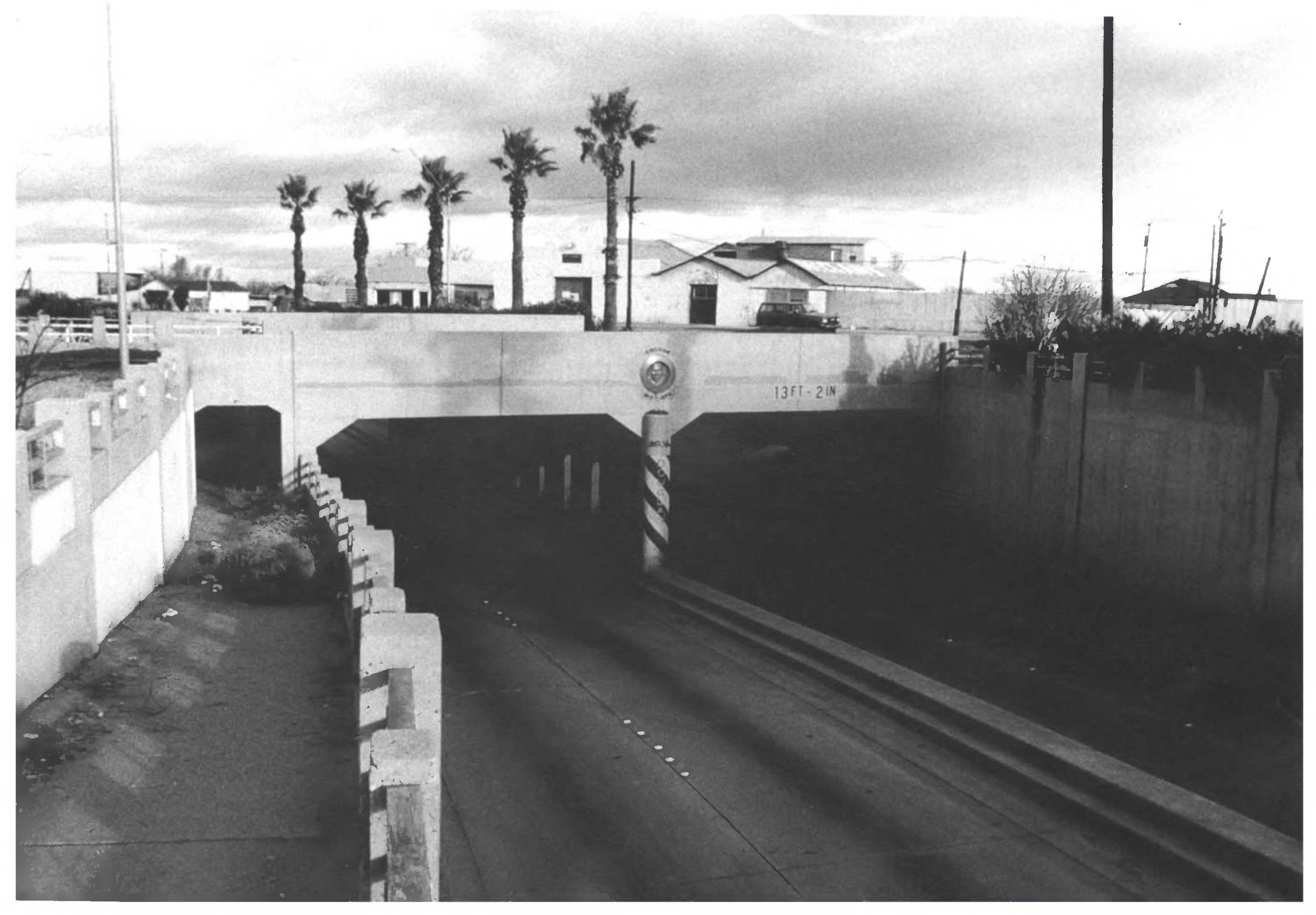
Douglas Underpass (demolished)

The following are images of the Gadsden Hotel. The hotel was originally built in 1908, but a fire destroyed almost everything in the hotel. It was rebuilt in 1929. The historic hotel, which was named after the Gadsden Purchase, is located at 1046 G. Ave. and was listed in the National Register of Historic Places on July 30, 1976, reference: #76000371.

The Gadsden Hotel

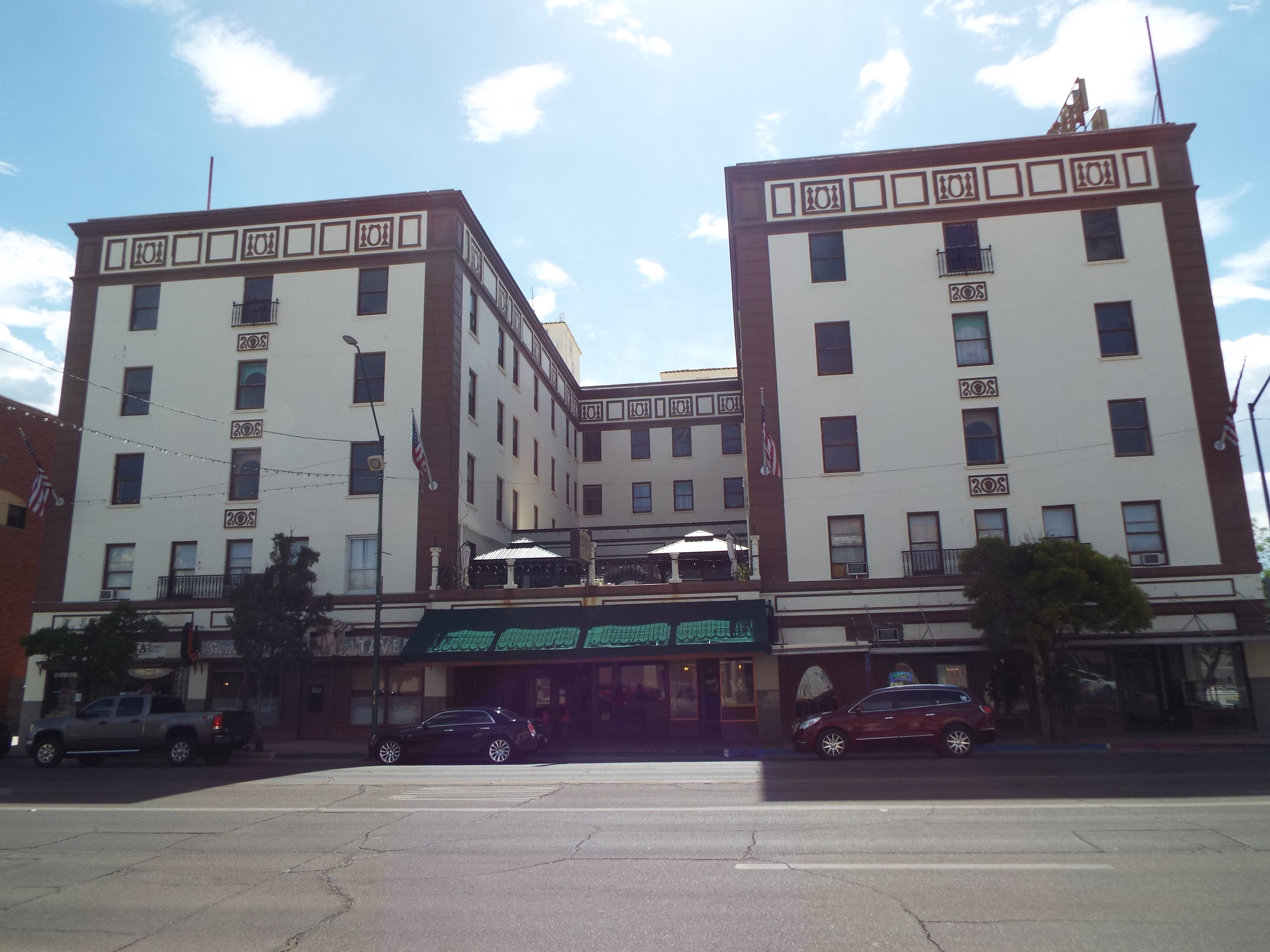
Gadsden Hotel – 1908/1929

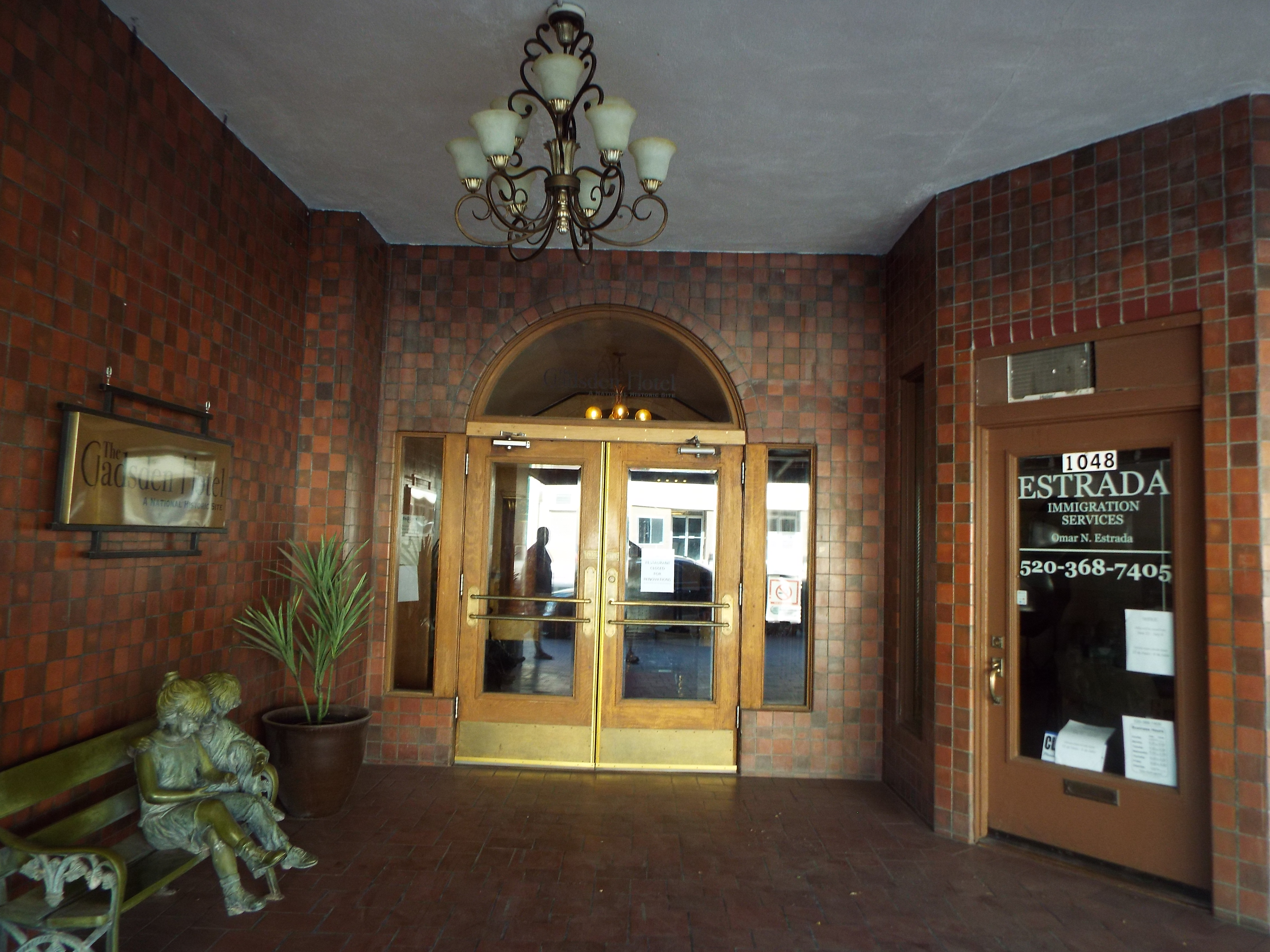
Hotel entrance

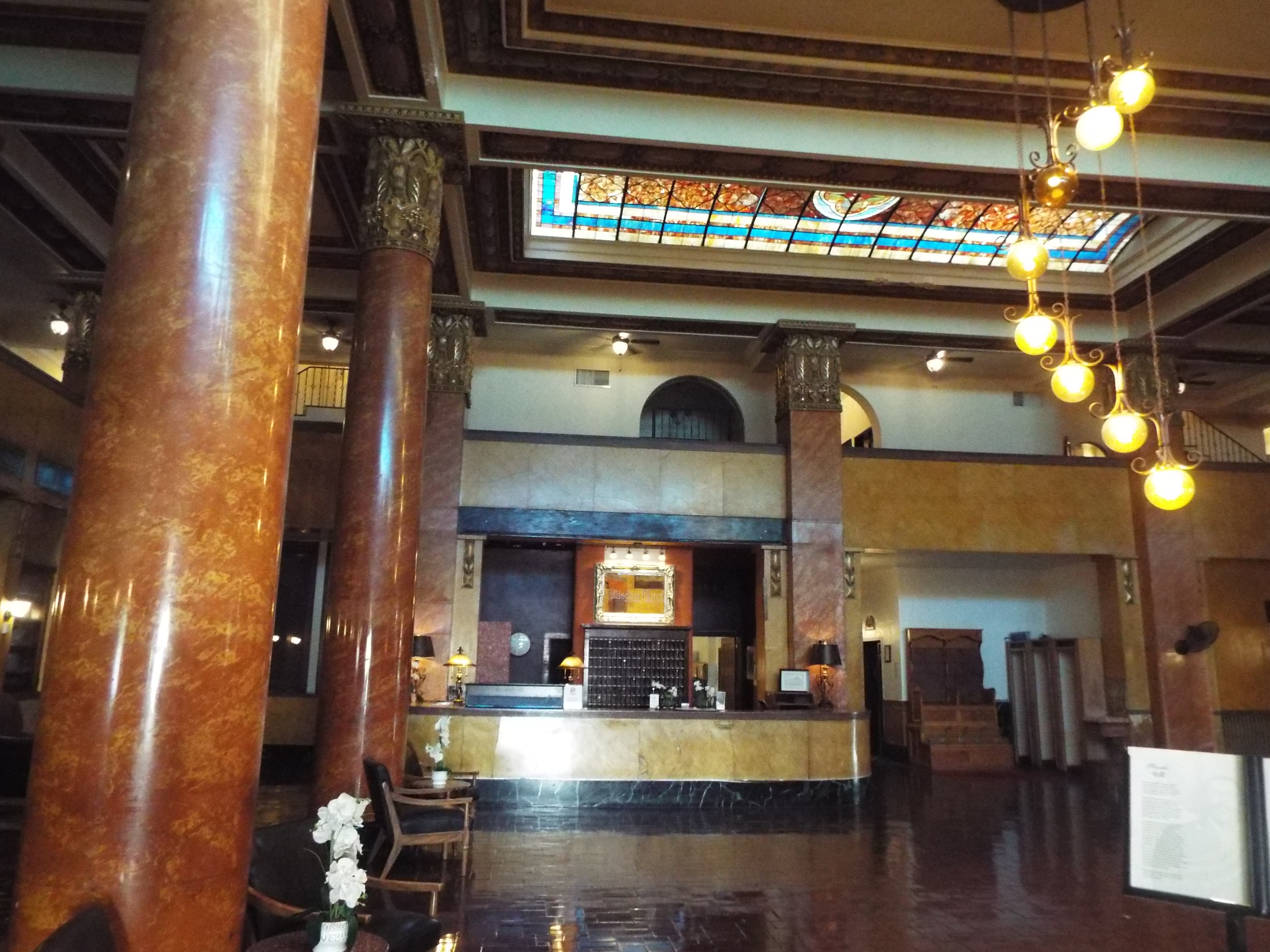
Hotel lobby

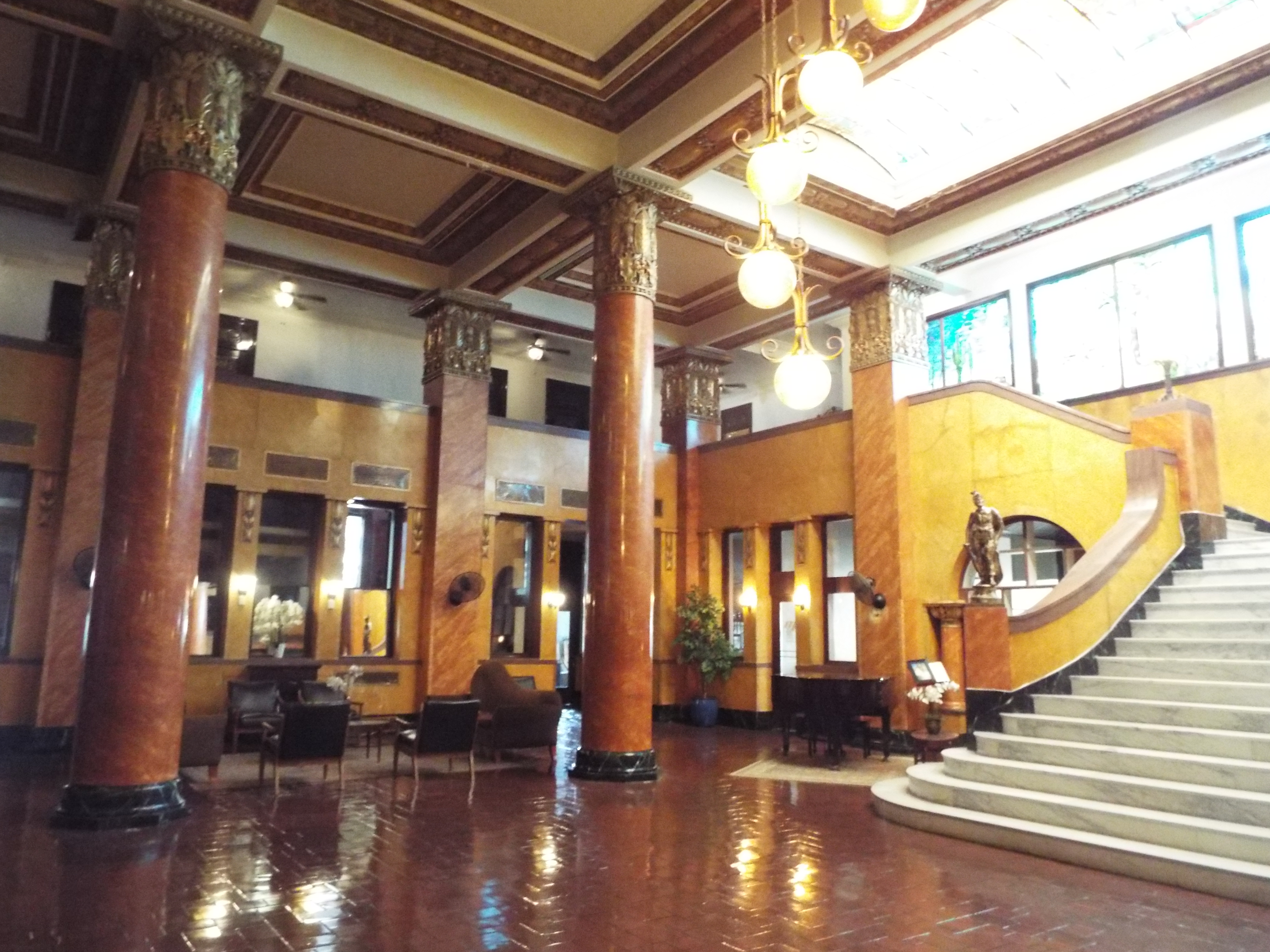
Different view of the hotel lobby and marble columns.

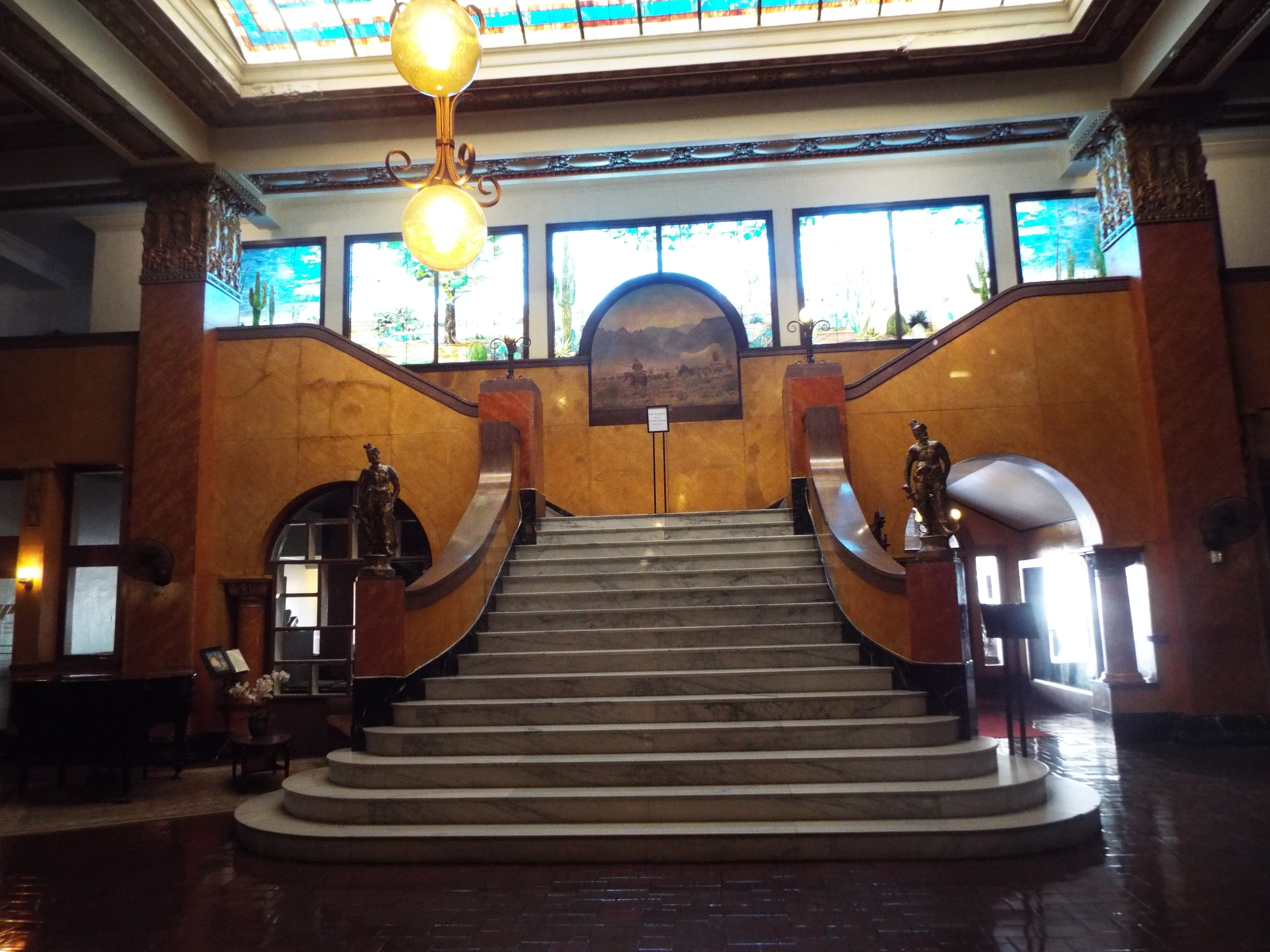
Solid white Italian marble staircase

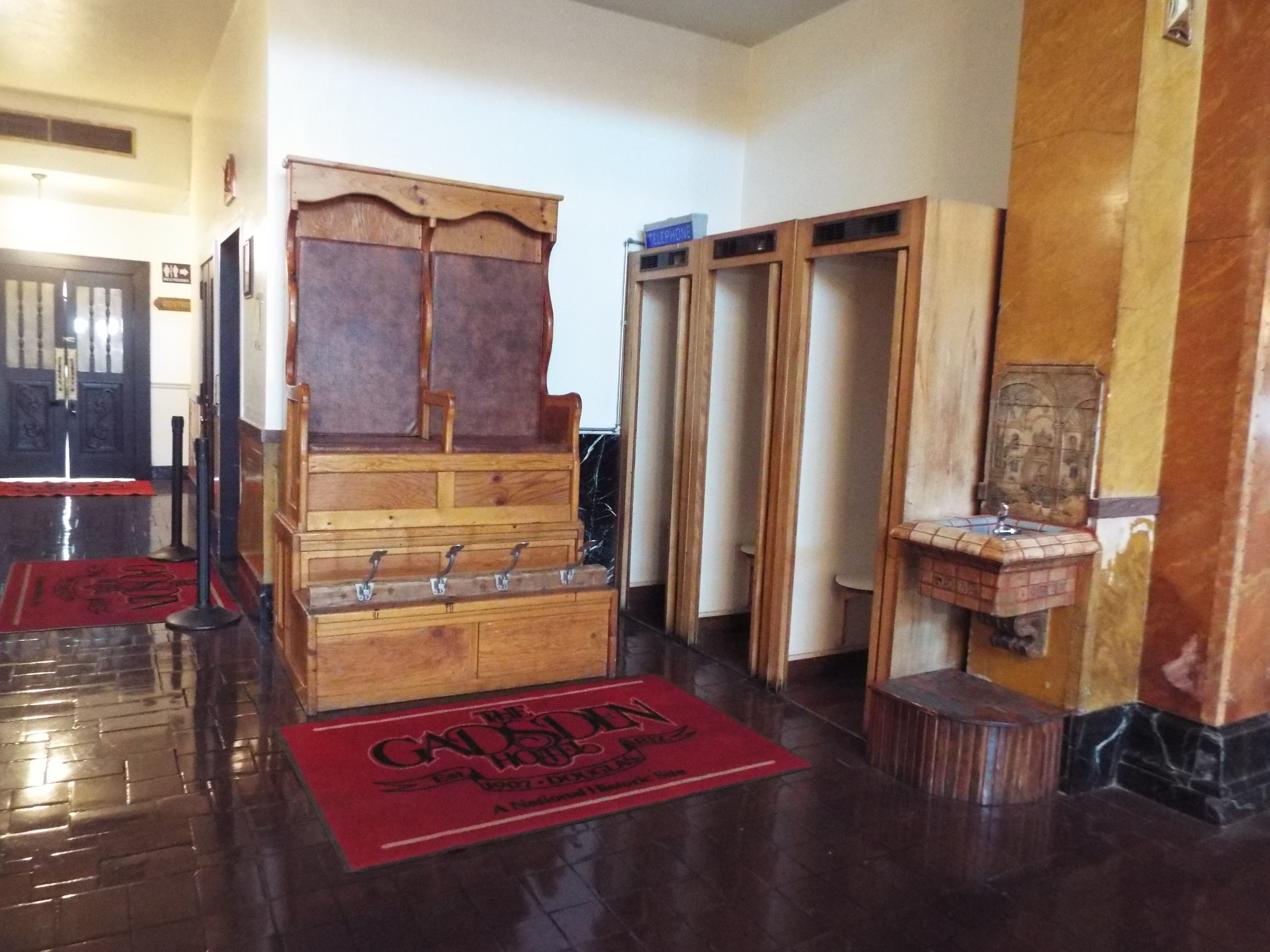
Old shoe shine and telephone booths

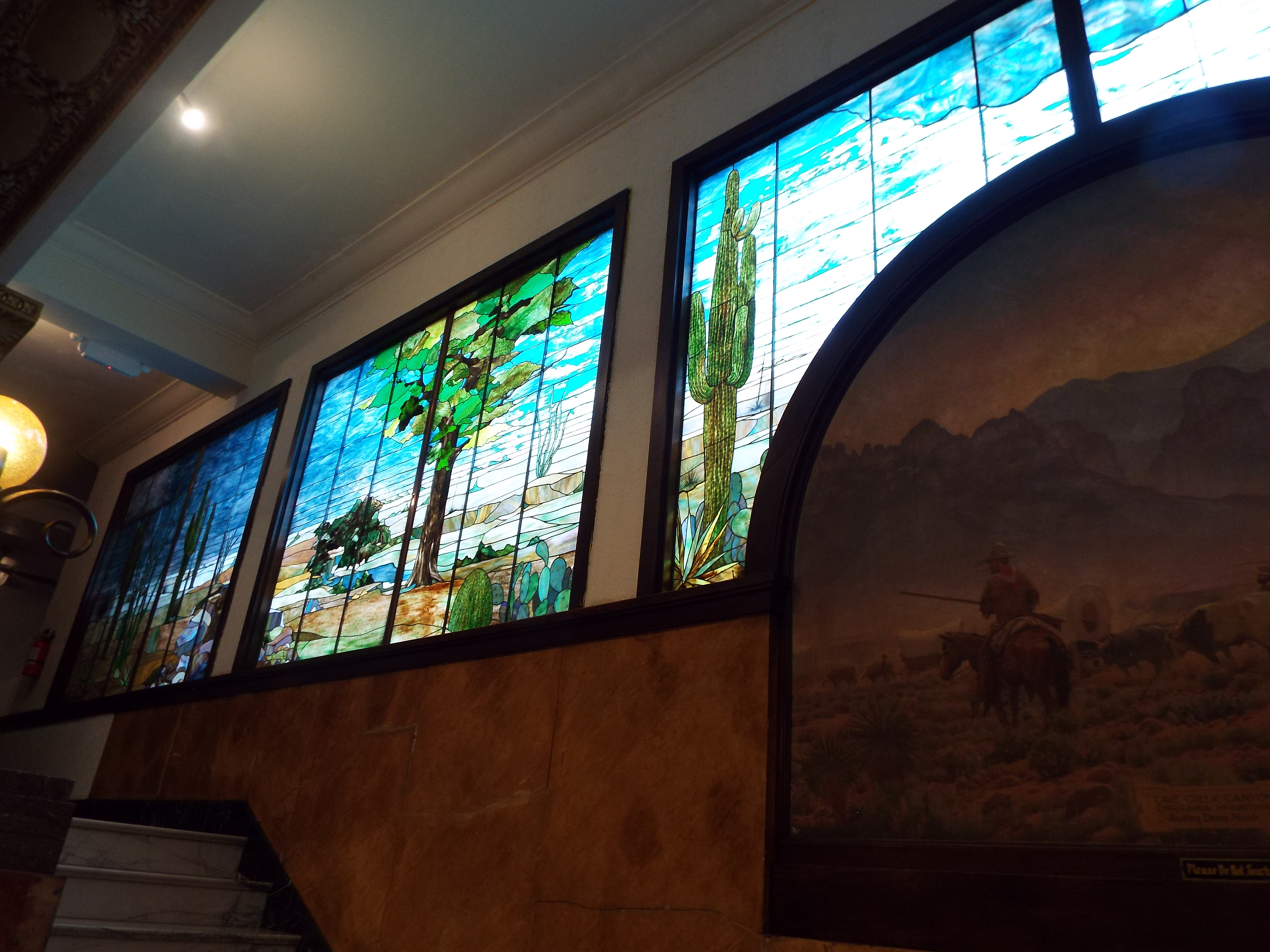
Tiffany & Co. 42 foot Stained Glass Mural

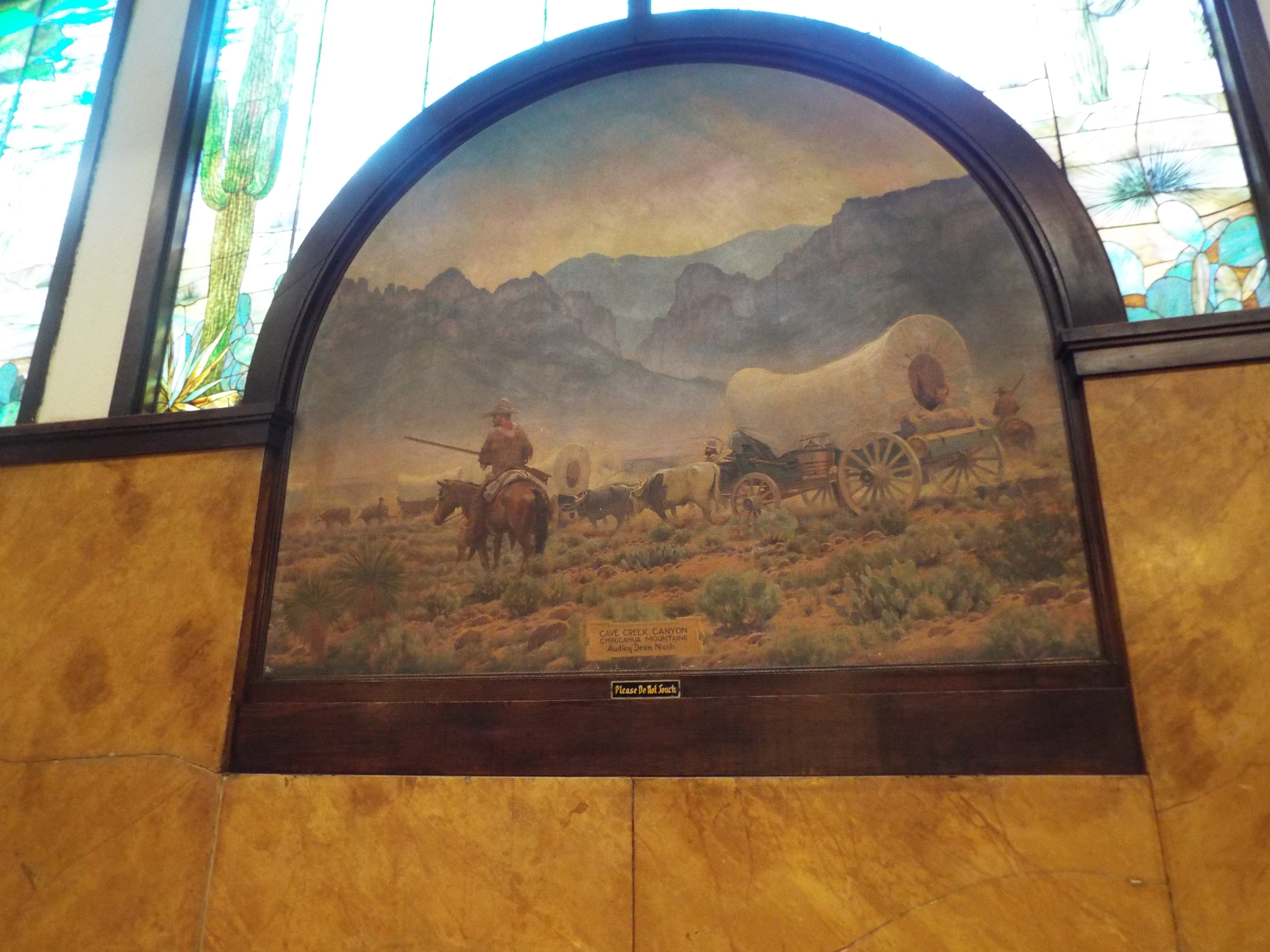
Oil painting by Audley Dean Nicols

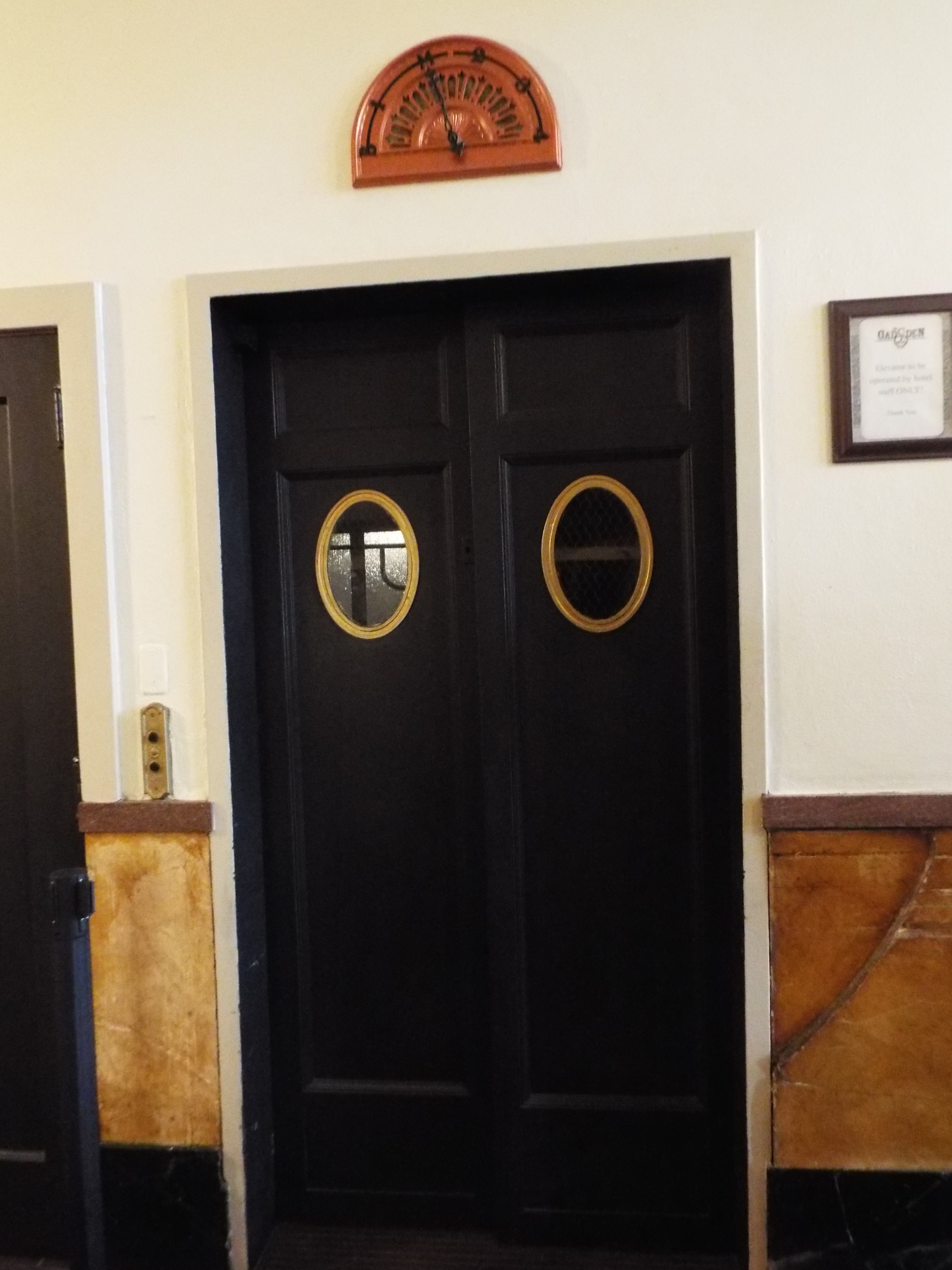
Original 1907 Otis Lift (Elevator)

== Historic districts and restricted areas ==
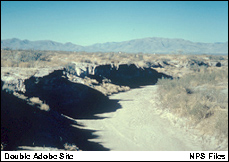
Double Adobe Site

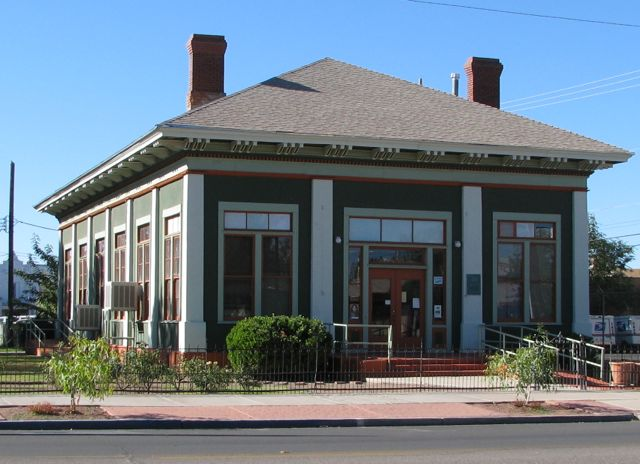
House in the Douglas Historic District

- The Douglas Historic District – Listed in the National Register of Historic Places on January 31, 1985, reference: #85000146.
- Douglas Residential Historic District – Roughly bounded by 12th St., Carmelita Ave., 7th St., and East Ave. Listed in the National Register of Historic Places on July 31, 1986, reference #86002095.
- Douglas Sonoran Historic District – U.S. Route 80 under Southern Pacific railroad tracks at milepost 366.1. Listed in the National Register of Historic Places on September 30, 1988, reference: #88001609.
- Geronimo Surrender Site Bluff – Overlooking Skeleton Canyon, 45 miles (72 km) northeast of Douglas. Listed in the National Register of Historic Places on March 6, 1998, reference: #98000170.
- Rucker Canyon Archeological District – Address restricted. Listed in the National Register of Historic Places on March 3, 1995, reference: #95000157.
- Rustler Park Fire Guard Station – Southeast of Chiricahua National Monument in Coronado National Forest. Listed in the National Register of Historic Places on June 10, 1993, reference: #93000518.
- Cima Park Fire Guard Station – In the Chiricahua Wilderness northeast of Douglas in Coronado National Forest. Listed in the National Register of Historic Places on June 10, 1993, reference: #93000514.
- Double Adobe Site – Address restricted. Listed in the National Register of Historic Places on October 15, 1966, reference: #66000169.

== The San Bernardino Ranch/ Slaughter Ranch ==
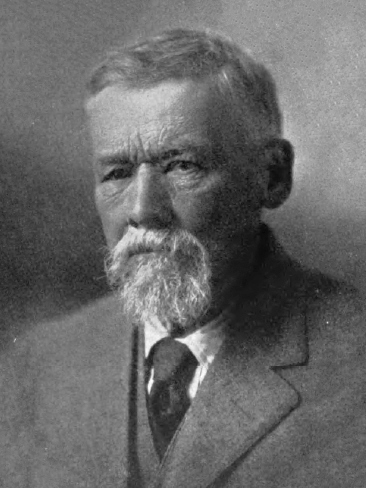
John Horton Slaughter

The San Bernardino Presidio was one of the presidios established during the 1700s where the San Bernardino Ranch is located. The San Bernardino Ranch was established between 1822 and 1855. On 2–3 December 1846, The Mormon Battalion passed through the San Bernardino Ranch. There they rested and recuperated near the ruins of the abandoned ranch house.

In 1886, John Horton Slaughter was elected sheriff of Cochise County. He would rather arrest a man than kill him. Nonetheless, he killed in the line of duty when necessary. While serving as sheriff, he helped the United States Cavalry track the Apache chief Geronimo. In 1893, he purchased a large area of land there. He paid $1 and twenty five cents for each foot. He purchased 60,000 feet of land and named it the Slaughter Ranch. The interesting thing about the ranch is that half of it was in the United States while the other half was in Mexico. It is located at 6153 Geronimo Trail. The ranch was listed in the National Register of Historic Places on October 15, 1966, reference: #66000170. It was also listed as a National Historic Landmark in 1964.

The San Bernardino Ranch/Slaughter Ranch

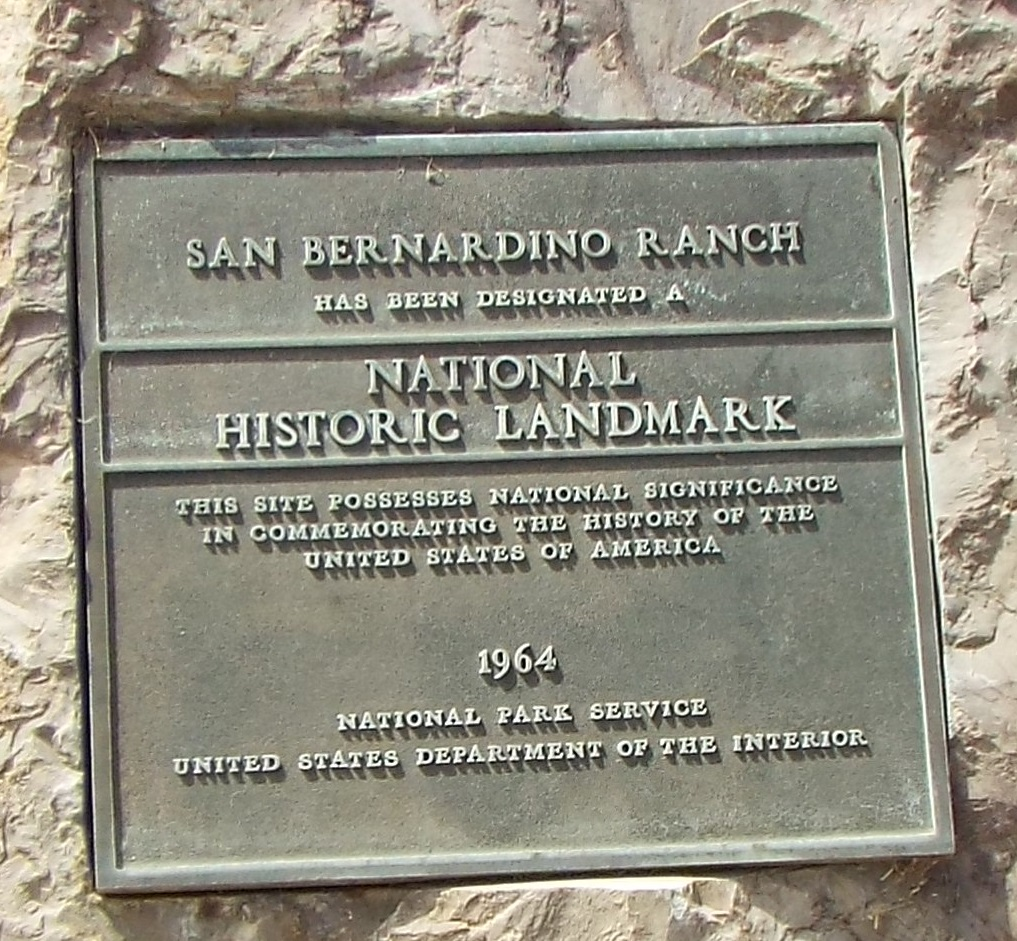
National Historic Landmark marker

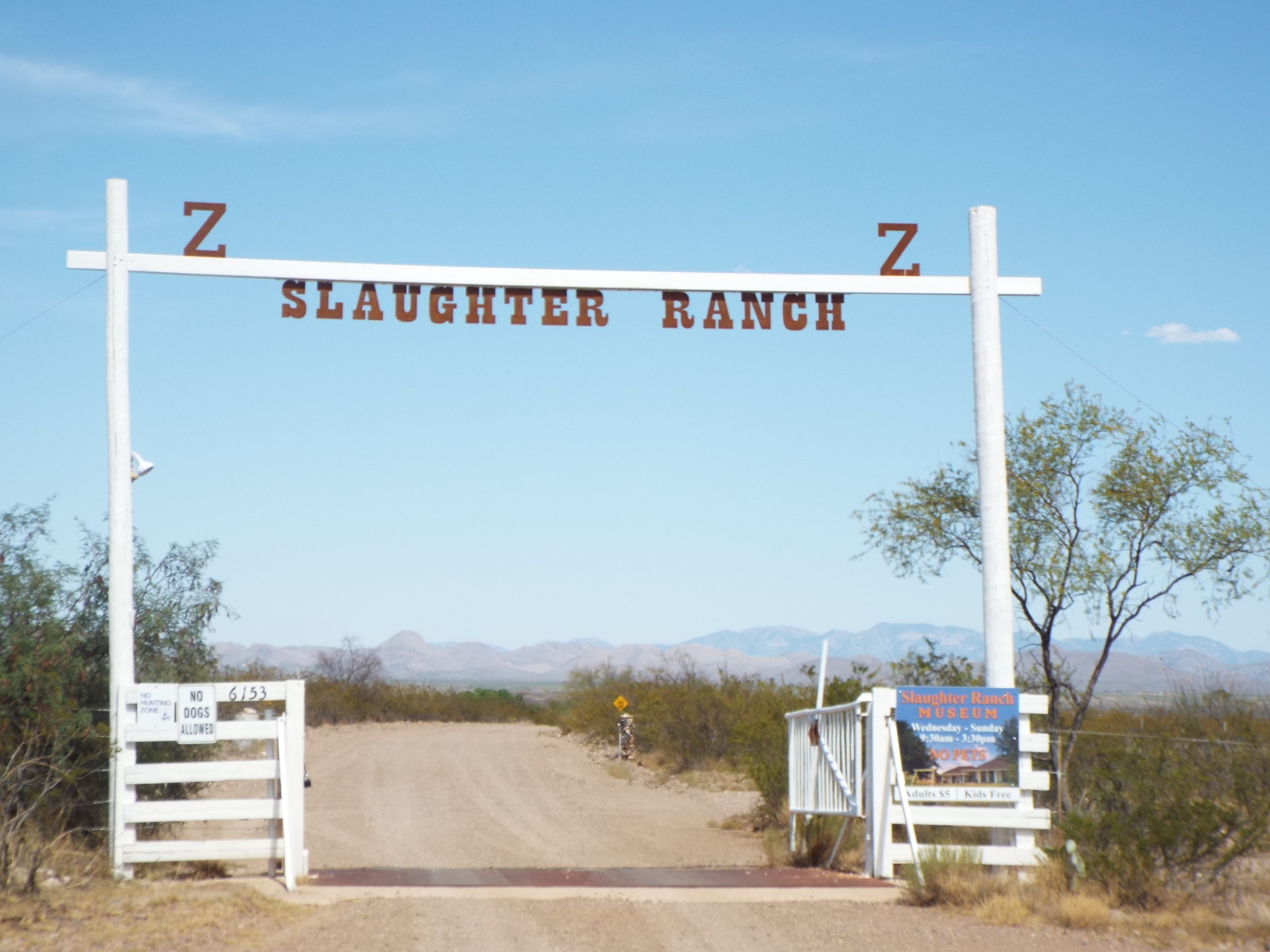
Slaughter Ranch entrance.

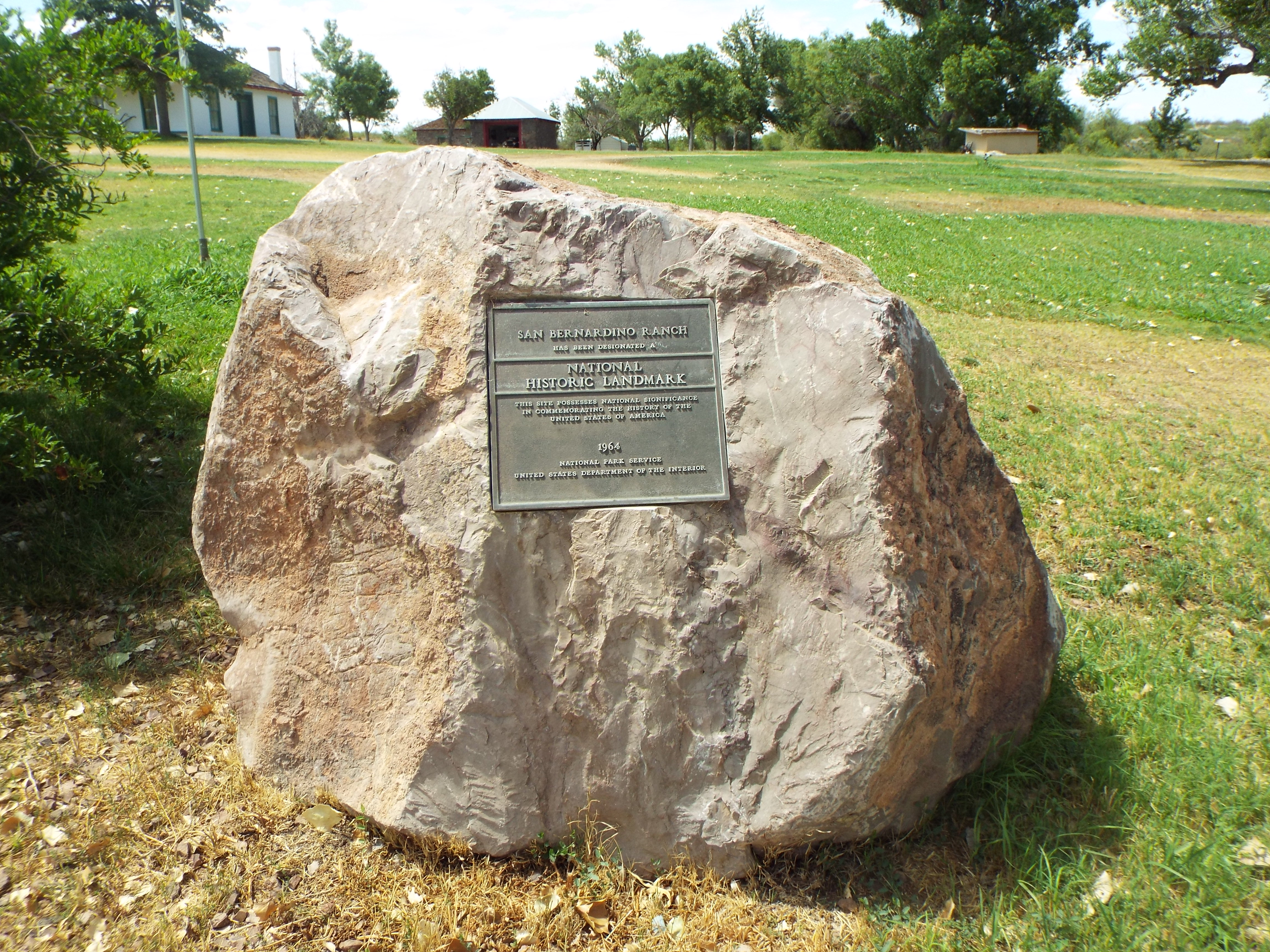
National Historic Landmark marker

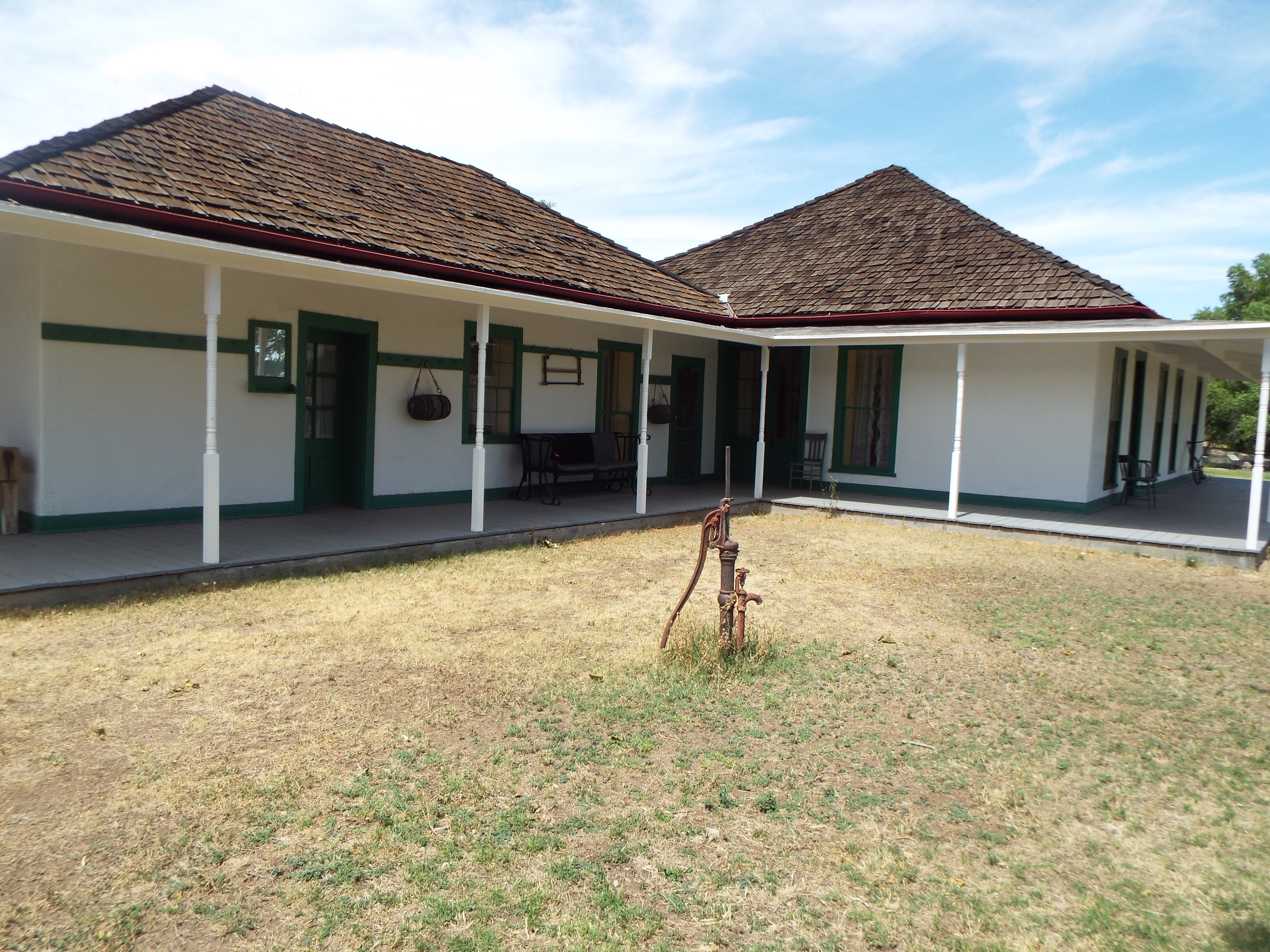
Main Ranch house

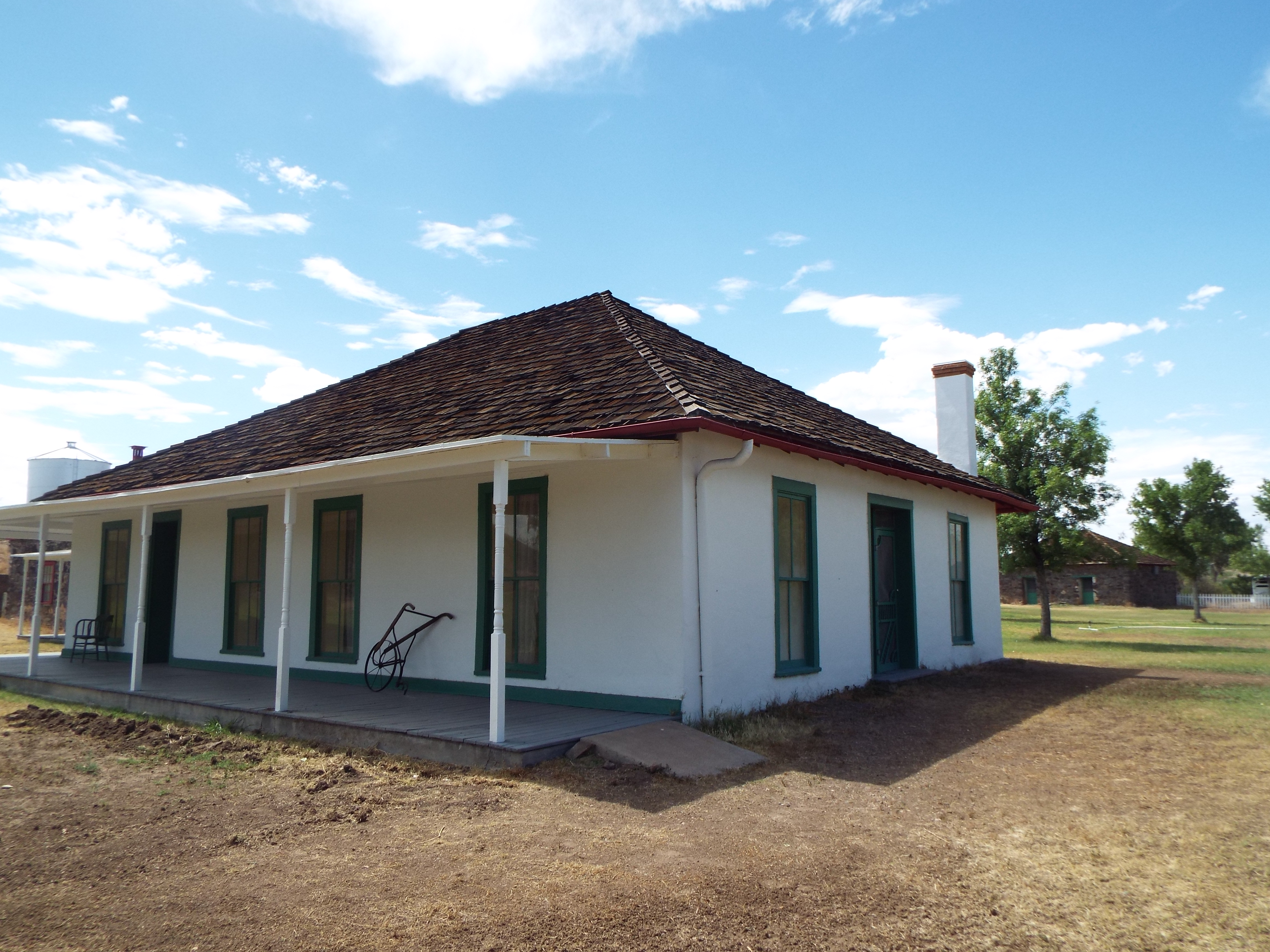
Different view of the main ranch house

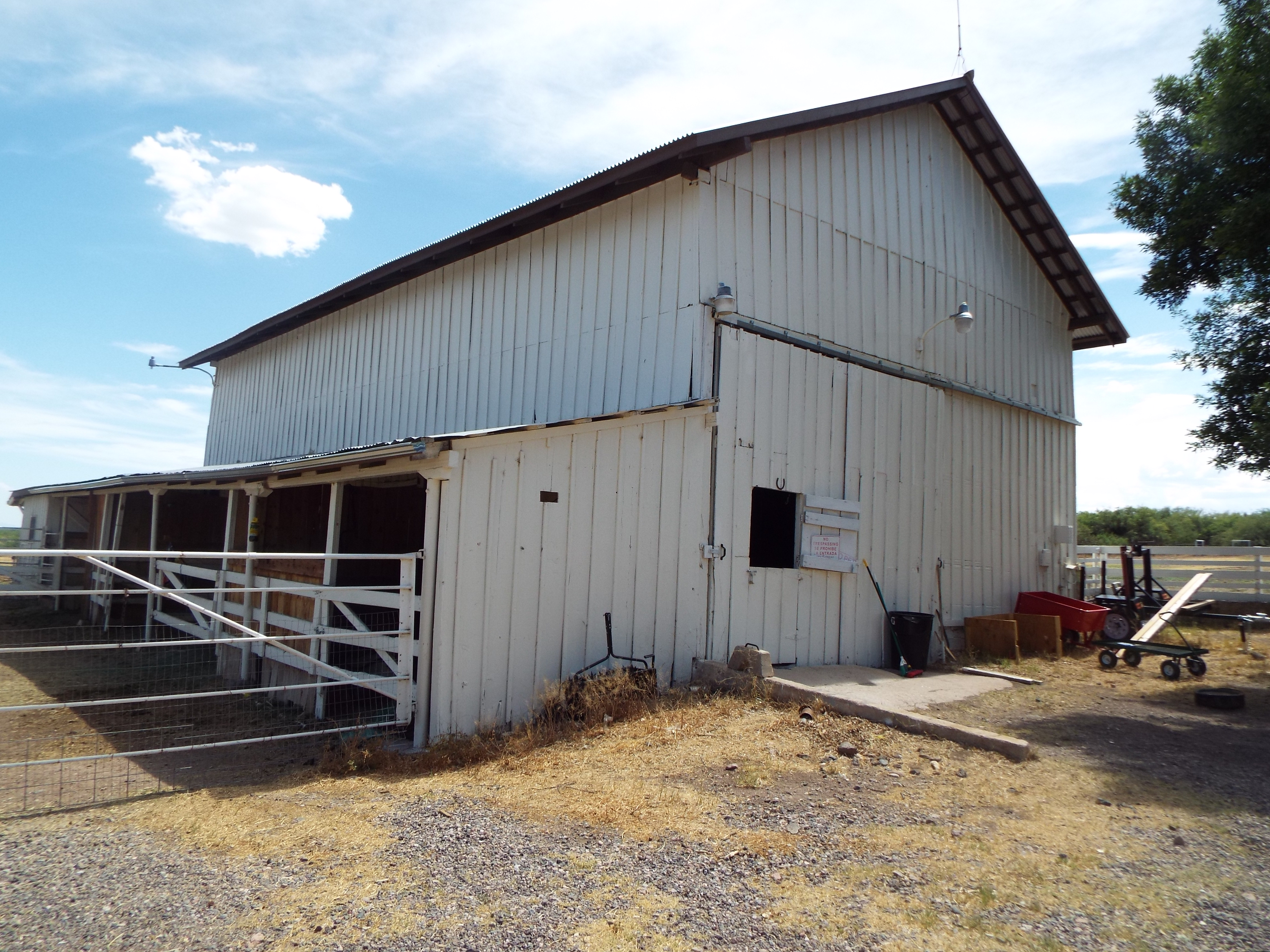
Barn

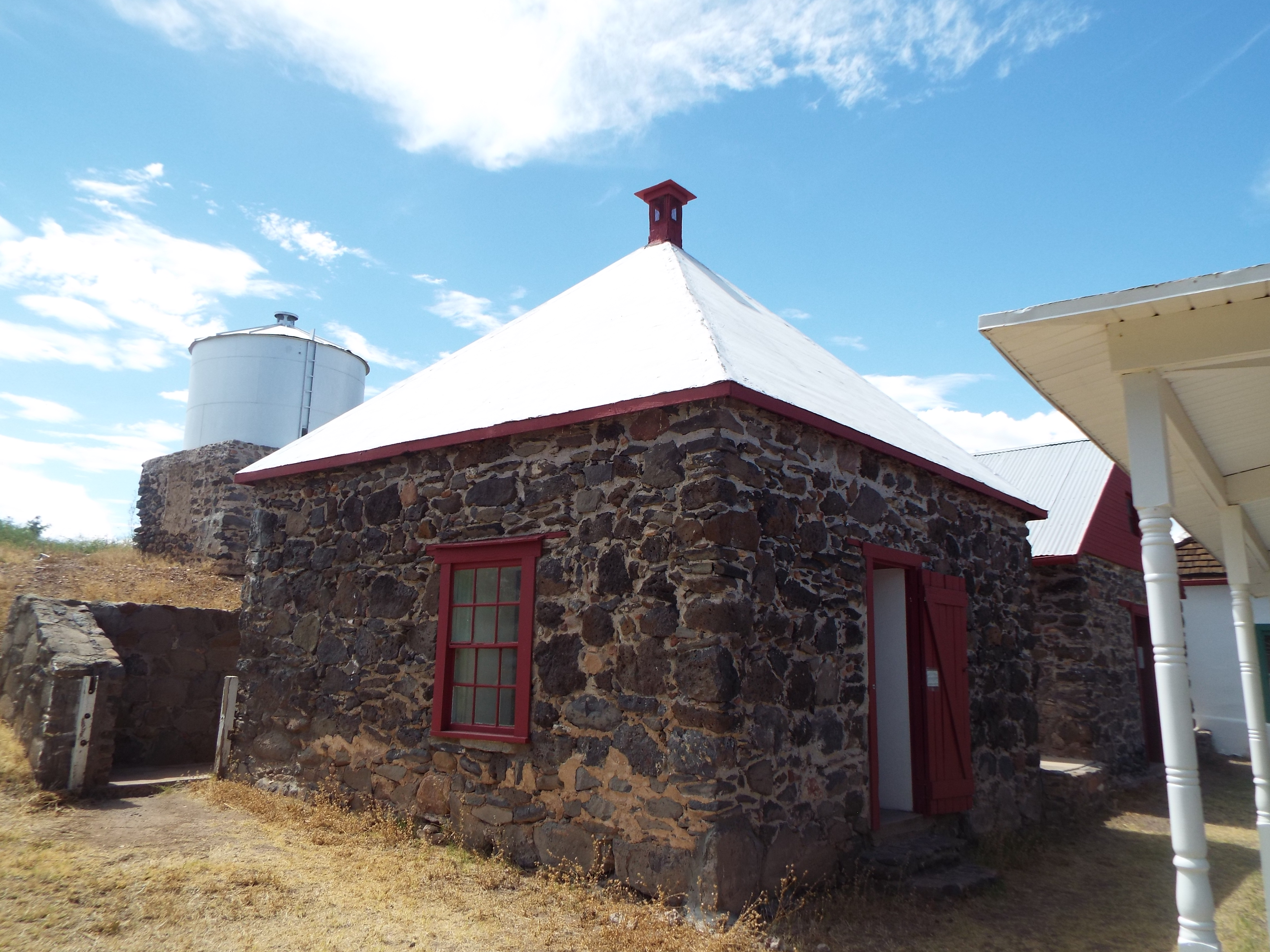
Ice house

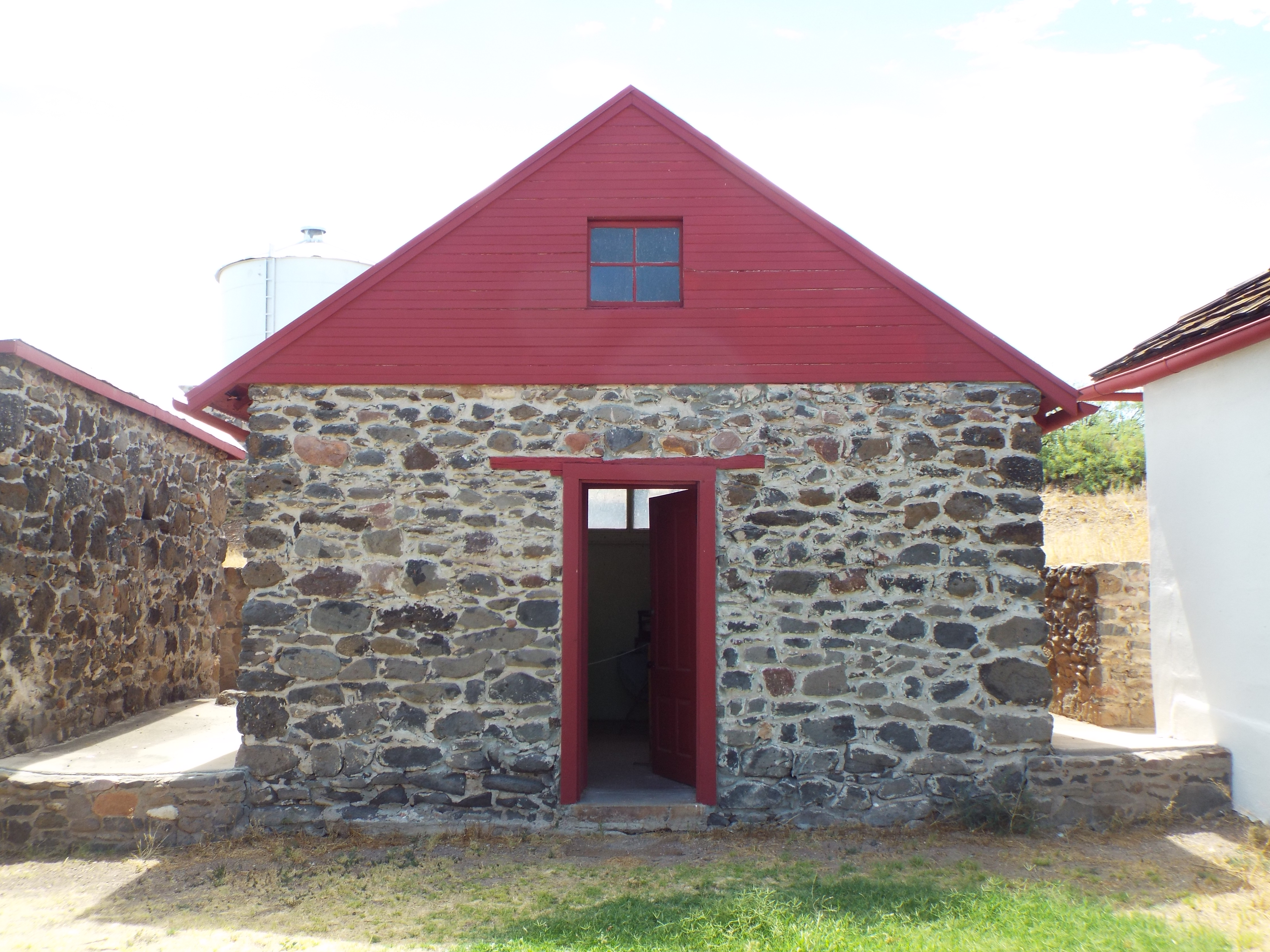
Meat house

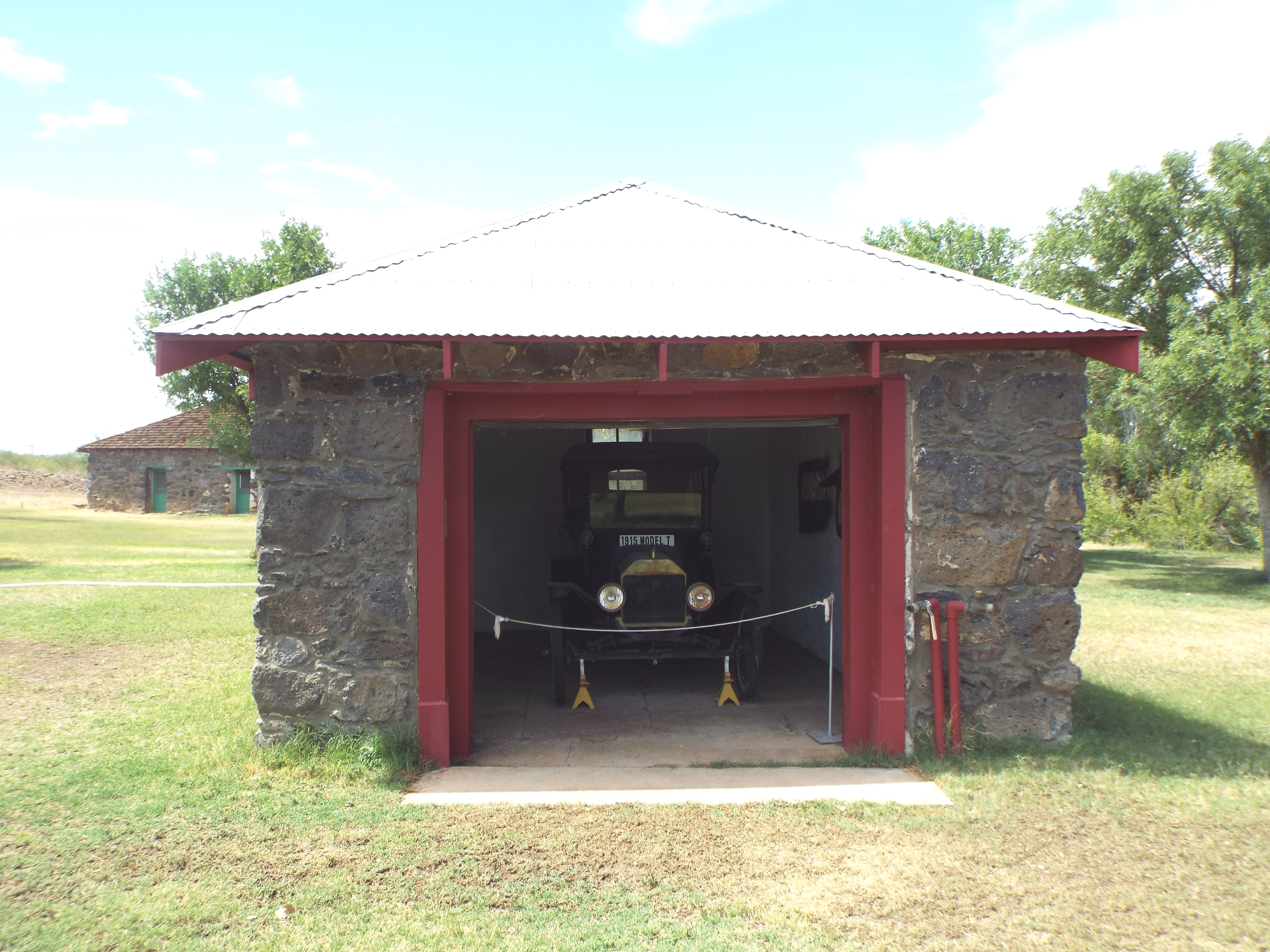
Garage

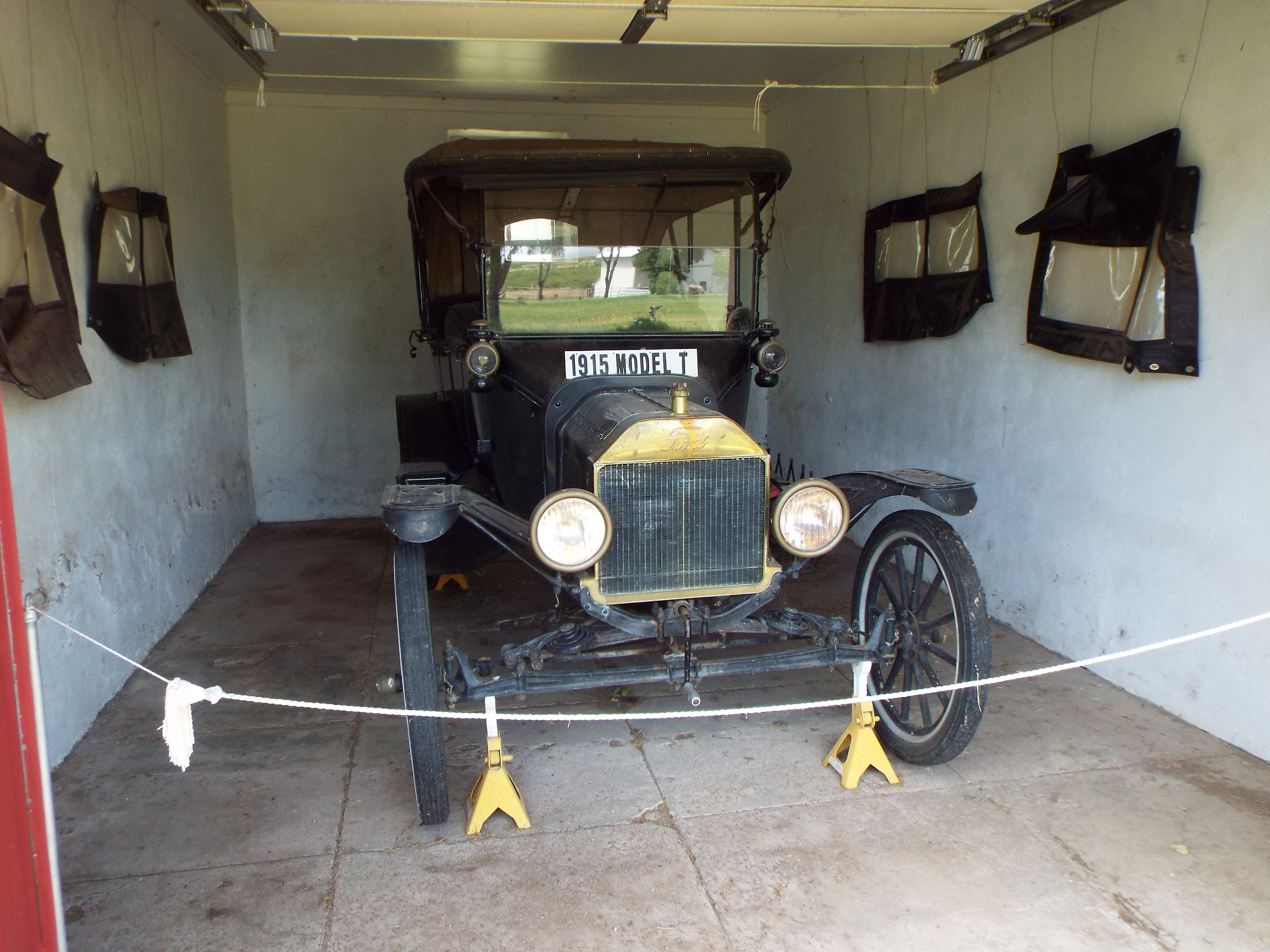
Slaughters' 1915 Ford Model T

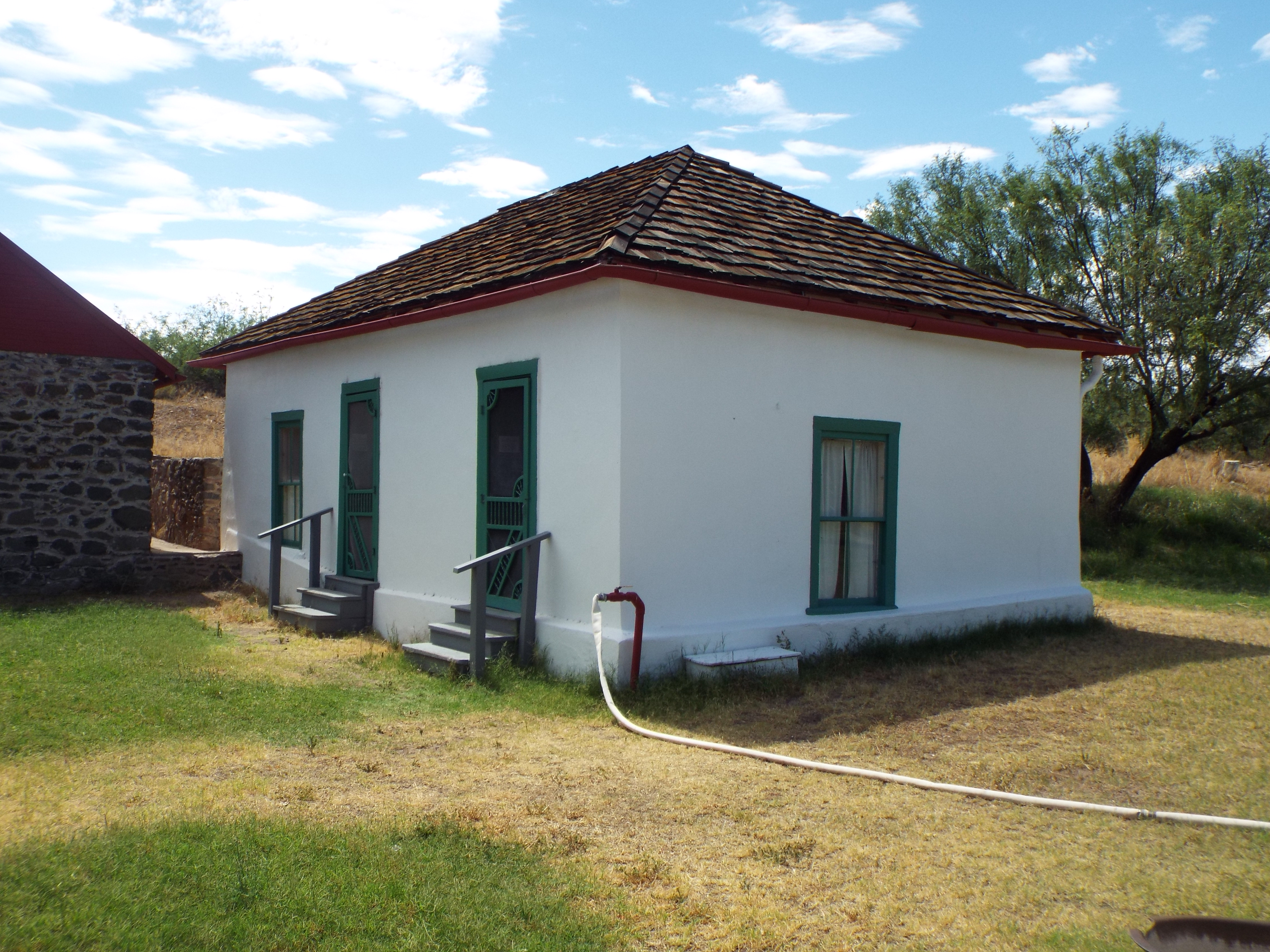
Commissary

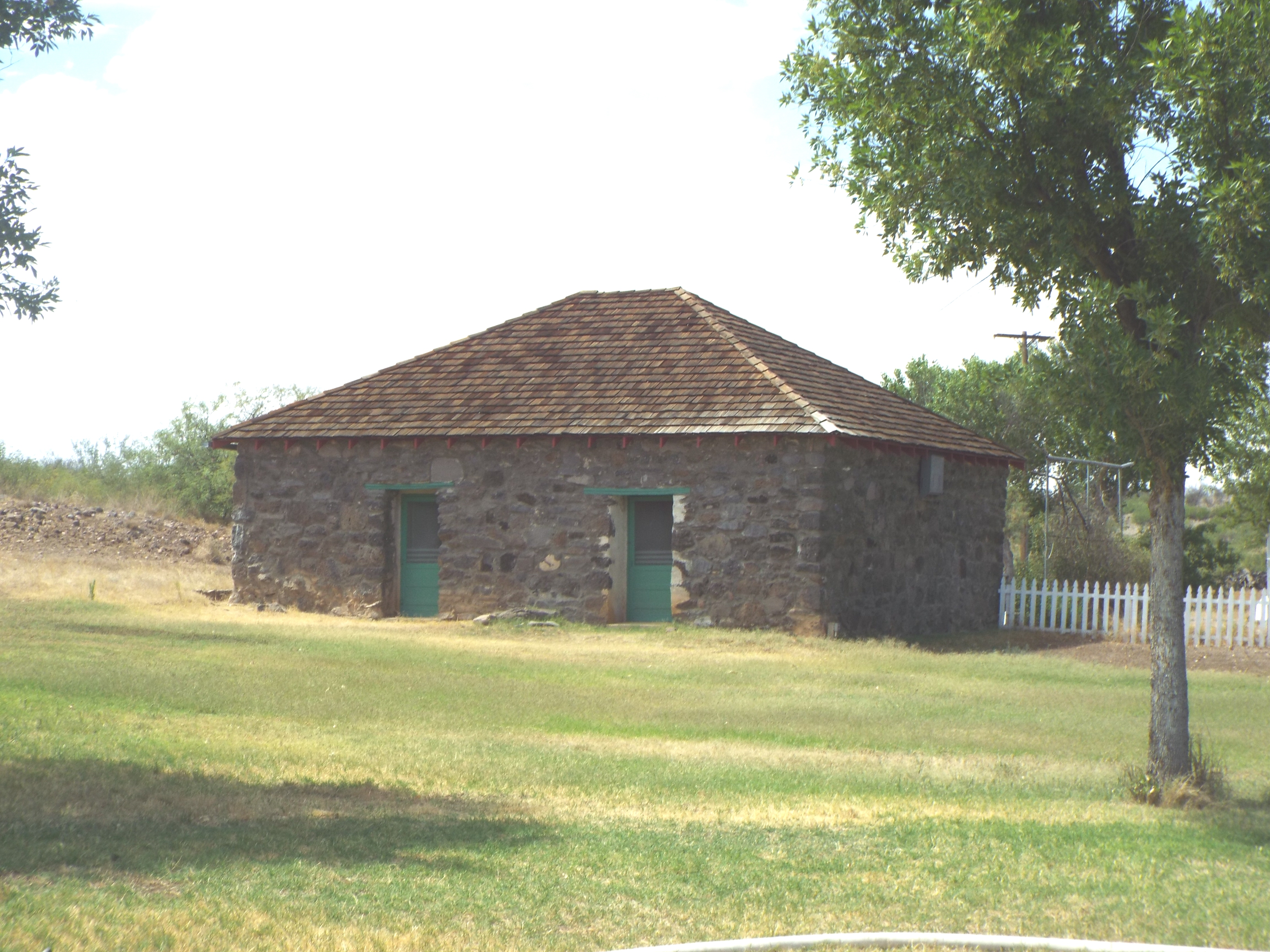
House

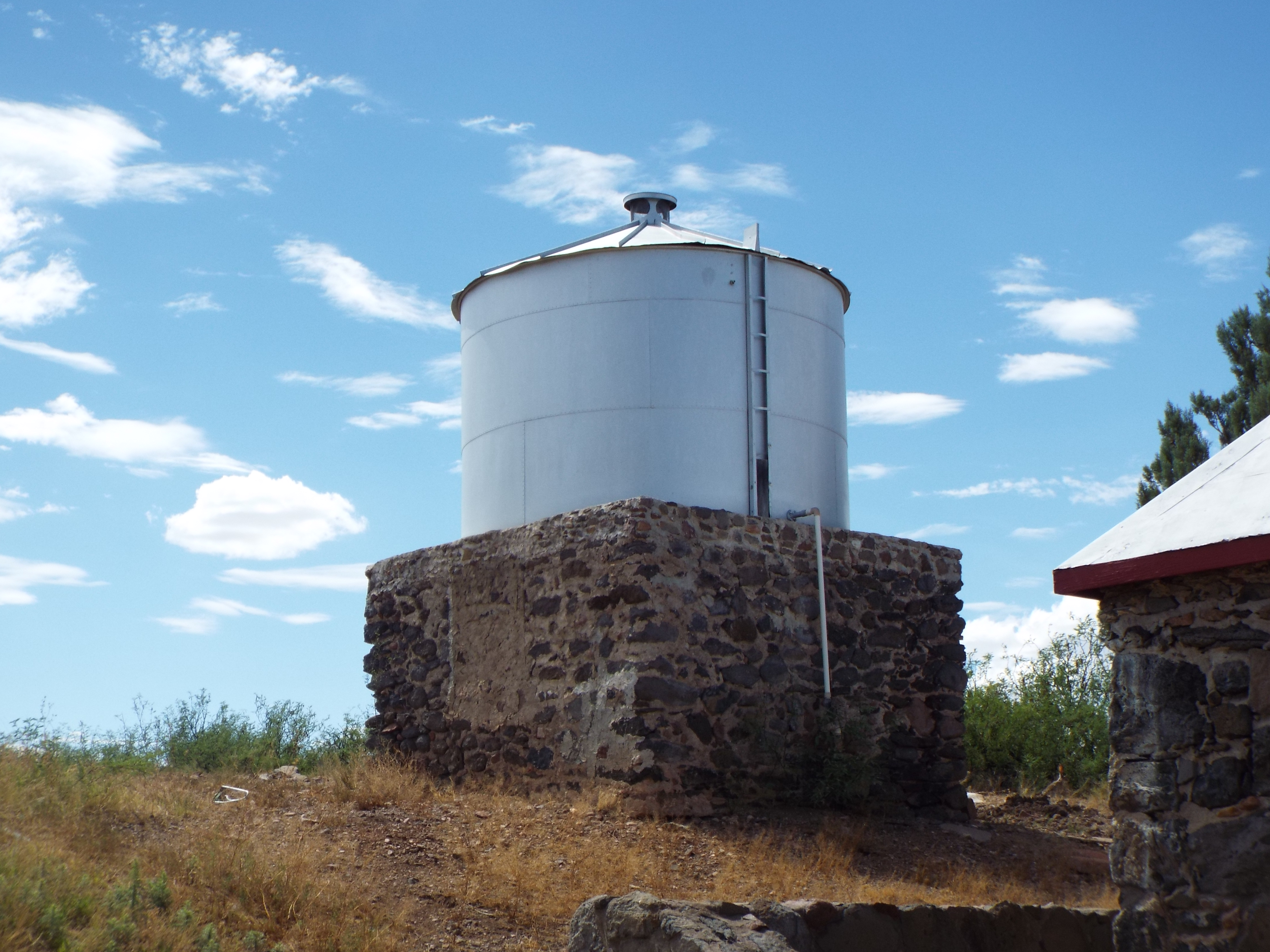
Water Tank

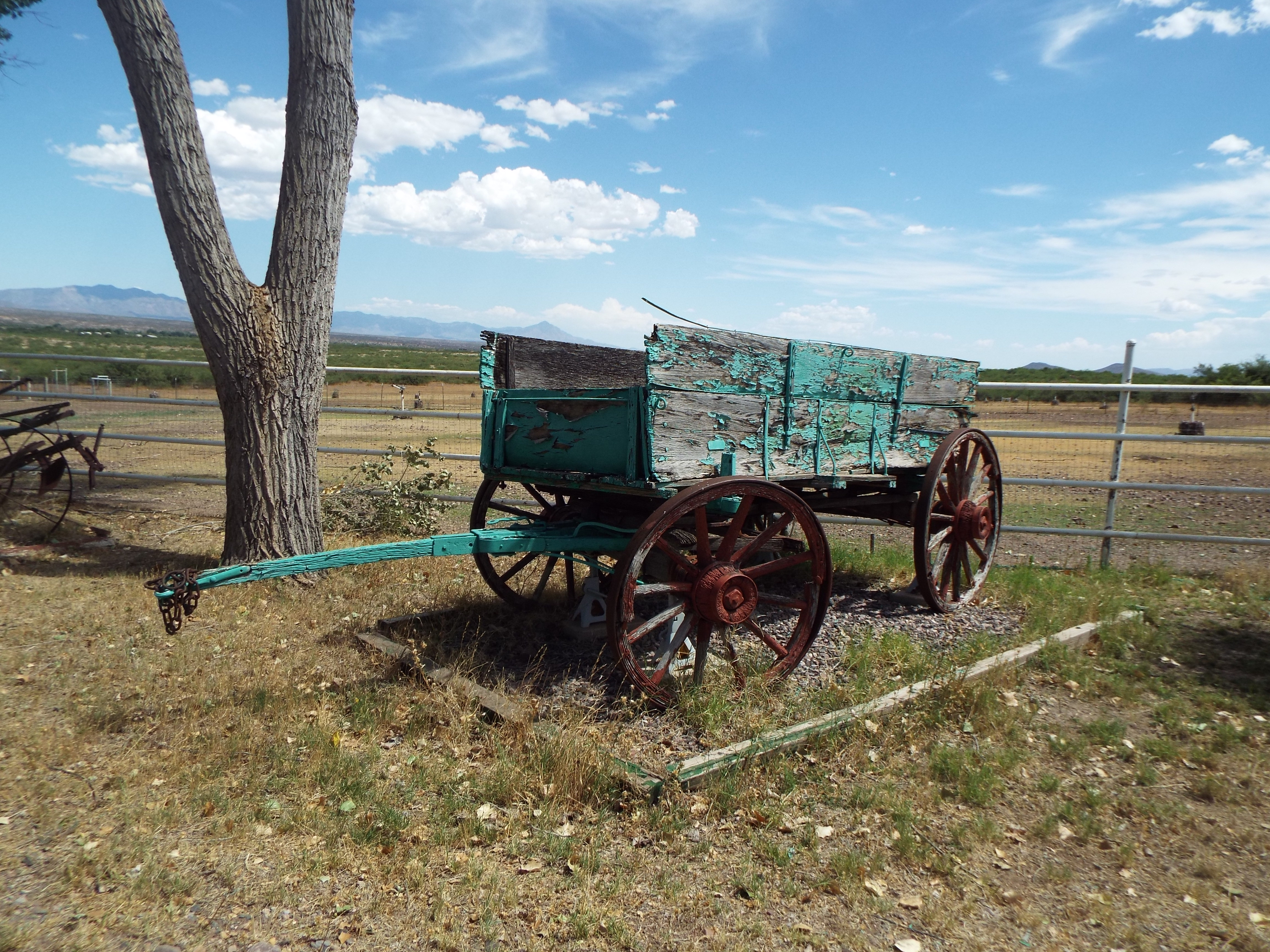
Wagon

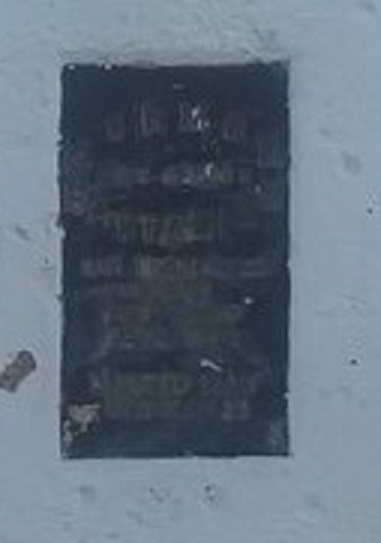
Mormon Battalion marker

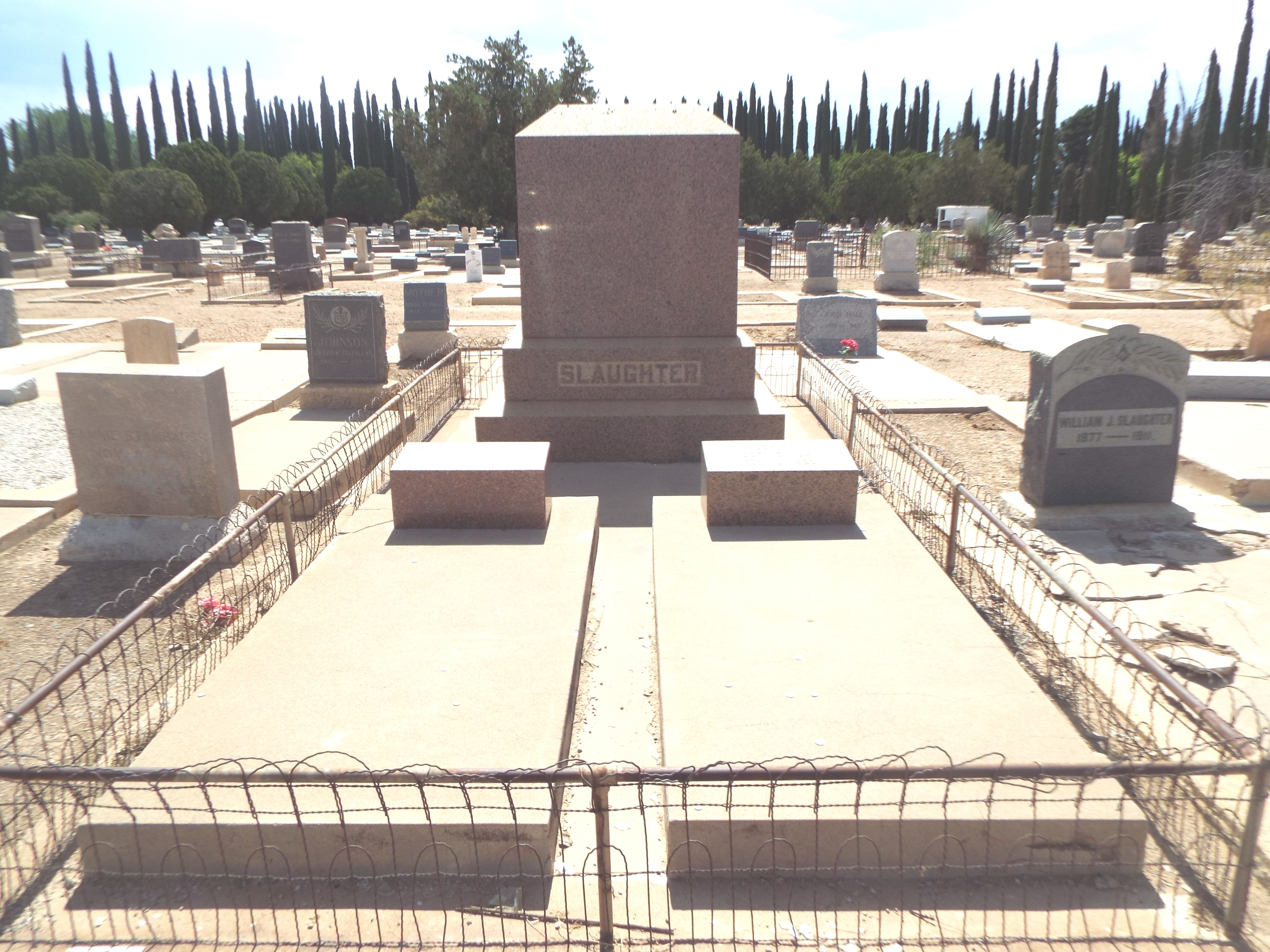
Grave of John Horton and Cora Viola Slaughter in the Calvary Cemetery

== See also ==
- National Register of Historic Places listings in Cochise County, Arizona
