= Banbridge (district) =

District of Northern Ireland (1973–2015)

Coordinates: 54.351°N 6.267°W

Banbridge District: Ceantar Dhroichead na Banna
- Area: 453 km^{2} (175 sq mi); Ranked 15th of 26
- District HQ: Banbridge
- Catholic: 32%
- Protestant: 62%
- Country: Northern Ireland
- Sovereign state: United Kingdom

Banbridge was a local government district in Northern Ireland. The district was one of 26 council areas formed on 1 October 1973, following the implementation of the Local Government Act (Northern Ireland) 1972. The headquarters of the council were in the town of Banbridge. In April 2015, most of the Banbridge district was included in the merged Armagh, Banbridge and Craigavon district. Some smaller areas in the east of the district (mostly those of a majority Catholic Population) became merged with the Newry, Mourne and Down District

== Location and geography ==
The area of the former district is in the west of County Down and covered an area of 175 square miles (450 km^{2}) of countryside – from Slieve Croob (1,775 ft) in the east to the River Bann valley in the west. It is also the main gateway to the Mourne Mountains, which lie to the south and is bisected by the A1 route between Belfast and Dublin.

The district was formed by the merger of Banbridge Urban District, Dromore Urban District and Banbridge Rural District. In 1993 there was a boundary change, and the Rathfriland area was transferred from the neighbouring district of Newry and Mourne. The other main small towns in the area included Gilford, Loughbrickland and Scarva. According to the 2001 census, the population of the district was just over 42,000 and according to the 2011 census this had grown to 48,339.

== Economic profile ==
Historically, Banbridge District's economy had its roots in manufacturing (textile/linen and shoe production), agriculture and the retailing/service sector. Ferguson's, one of the oldest names in the Irish linen industry, still operates in Banbridge, and a shoe factory first opened in 1947 and closed in the early 2000s. It employed 600 workers at its height. According to council statistics the district was home to over 1,770 businesses, the vast majority of which had fewer than 10 employees. One of the most important recent large-scale economic developments to occur in the district was the opening of a discount fashion outlet on the outskirts of Banbridge, which currently has 59 different stores. The outlet forms part of the Bridgewater Park development project, for which Tesco currently has planning permission to open one of its largest stores in Ireland. In late 2010 Asda also submitted plans for a store in Banbridge, with the possibility of creating jobs for up to 250 district residents.

Economic Indicator	Geographic Unit	2004	2005	2006	2007	2008	2009	2010	2011
Median Gross Weekly Wage (£)	Banbridge	.	.	280.4	308.1	294.0	324.8	271.7	280.5
	Northern Ireland	305.4	318.7	322.7	329.9	346.5	354.6	356.6	360.0
Mean Gross Weekly Wage (£)	Banbridge	250.6	348.3	330.9	399.3	400.0	392.0	354.6	353.9
	Northern Ireland	361.7	377.3	379.9	391.3	408.6	422.9	417.9	426.7
Unemployment Rate (claimant count) (%)	Banbridge	.	1.3	1.2	1.1	1.4	2.8	3.5	4.0
	Northern Ireland	.	2.6	2.5	2.2	2.4	4.3	4.9	5.2

== Health profile ==
In 2006–2008 the life of expectancy of females living in the district was 82.6 years (Northern Ireland average was 81.3), compared with a life expectancy of 78.1 for males (Northern Ireland average was 79.3). According to the Northern Ireland Statistics and Research Agency, in 2010 the district had a total of 12 GP practices with a total 31 GPs serving 54,956 registered patients, resulting in an average GP list size of 1,773, compared to the Northern Ireland average of 1,608. The district had its own hospital, located in Banbridge, until December 1996 when inpatient services were ended. Craigavon Area Hospital now deals with the majority of primary care cases from the district. In January 2002, the former district council paid £725,000 for the former site of the hospital with the aim of turning it into a Community Health Village. In March 2011, the-then Minister for Health, Michael McGimpsey, approved plans for the start of construction of a new Community Treatment and Care Centre and Day Care facility in the grounds of the Community Health Village. This new facility, which will join the already relocated Banbridge Group Surgery, will cost an estimated £16.5 million and be home to around 220 staff.

== Environmental profile ==
Since the late 1990s more and more attention has been paid both by the local council and residents to enhancing the district's environmental profile. Over the past decade Banbridge district has repeatedly recorded one of the highest levels of recycling in Northern Ireland. In 2009–2010, for example, almost 52% of household waste was recycled/composted. In June 2009, a bring-and-buy reuse shop, Restore, was also opened by the local council in an effort to reduce waste in the district. In May 2012 the council beat Warwickshire County Council and Cardiff City Council to win the best Local Authority Recycling Initiative at the ninth annual Awards for Excellence in Recycling and Waste Management.

In 2007 a biodiversity audit was carried out and in late 2007 a biodiversity action plan was published. Like the rest of Northern Ireland, woodlands make up only a small percentage of the former district's land cover (according to the Forestry Commission only 6.5% of Northern Ireland was forested in 2010). In recent years public funds have been committed to improving access to and the quality of outdoor spaces, including for example Solitude Park in Banbridge, the Newry Canal Towpath which ran through the western part of the district, and Slieve Croob taking in the Legananny Dolmen and the Finnis souterrain (known locally as Binder's Cove). Given the unfavourable topography, the district was not home to any wind turbines, but it was announced in May 2010 that a biogas site would be built.

== Educational profile ==
Banbridge District lay within the former Southern Education and Library Board area and was home to thirty-one publicly funded educational establishments. This included: three pre-primary nurseries; twenty-one primary schools (of which ten were “controlled” primaries, one was a “grant-maintained integrated” primary, and the other ten were “maintained” primaries); five post-primary institutions (of which one was a maintained secondary, two were controlled secondary schools, one was a controlled grammar school, and one was a grant-maintained integrated school). There was also a special education school in Banbridge catering for pupils aged five to nineteen, which lay adjacent to one of six campuses belonging to the Southern Regional College.

== Sports and community sector ==
According to information collected by the local council, over 200 community groups and more than 80 sports clubs operated in the Banbridge District. In all probability these figures represent a conservative estimate of the vibrancy and diversity of social capital in the local area as the council's directory of community groups and sports clubs included some but not all of the many different youth, sports, and other types of groups and clubs that met under the auspices of local churches.

== Arts and culture profile ==
Local government funding for the arts in the district was comparatively very low. In the financial year 2003–2004 the local council spent £1.23 per capita on the arts, which covers arts development and support, as well as spending on theatres and public entertainment. This compared to a mean Northern Ireland per-capita spend of £7.70, putting Banbridge District in 22nd place out of the 26 local councils. By 2006–2007, the mean per-capita spending on the arts by the council had risen to £3.38, but this compared to a Northern Ireland average of £8.44, putting the council at fifth from the bottom of Northern Ireland's 26 local authorities.

The two main arts venues in the area of the former district are the Iveagh Cinema and the F.E. McWilliam Gallery and Studio. The £3-million cinema, which opened in May 2004, is home to a 300-seater screen that was specially designed and built to double up as a theatre facility for live performances, plays, and arts events. The F.E. McWilliam Gallery and Studio, opened in September 2008, houses the contents of the London studio of F. E. McWilliam, a sculpture garden of McWilliam's work, as well as providing a dedicated gallery space for temporary exhibitions.

== District council ==
The district was divided into three electoral areas: Banbridge, Knockiveagh and Dromore, which between them returned 17 members. Elections of the whole council were usually held every four years and were conducted under the proportional representation single transferable vote system. Notably, Banbridge District Council was the only council controlled by one party (the UUP) from its creation in 1973 until the year 2000 when the DUP gained a seat in a by-election in Dromore. Following the May 2011 local-government elections, the UUP retook its position from the DUP as the largest party on the council, winning seven of the 17 seats available. This was one of the few gains made by the UUP in either the local or Assembly elections of that year. Six of the 17 councillors elected in 2011 were women. At 56 percent, turnout in the 2011 elections was the lowest it had been since Banbridge Council was formed in 1973.

In the civic year 2011–2012 UUP councillors Joan Baird and Carol Black served as the head and deputy head of the council. This was the first time in the history of Banbridge Council that the positions of chairman and vice-chairman had been held by women.

=== Election results ===
Elections of the entire council were held every four years. The number of seats won by each party is shown below. An election was due in 2009, but this was delayed until 2011 so as to accommodate the completion of a local-government reform programme aimed at reducing the number of council areas from 26 to 11. The proposed amalgamation was abandoned in 2010, and so the 2011 elections returned members for the original 26 councils.

Party	1973	1977	1981	1985	1989	1993	1997	2001	2005	2011
UUP	8	8	8	8	9	10	9	7	5	7
DUP	0	3	4	3	2	2	3	5	6	5
SDLP	1	2	2	3	3	3	3	3	3	2
SF	0	0	0	0	0	0	0	0	0	2
Alliance	0	0	0	0	0	1	0	1	1	1
Other Unionist	3	1	0	0	0	0	0	0	1	0
Independent	3	1	1	1	1	1	2	1	1	0
Total seats	15	15	15	15	15	17	17	17	17	17
Female councillors	-	-	-	-	-	-	-	3	7	6
Turnout (incl. spoilt ballots)	71.34	63.62	72.43	67.17	65.78	62.05	57.57	69.60	63.45	56.42

==== 2008 Dromore by-election ====
In late 2007 UUP Councillor Tyrone Howe resigned due to work commitments. The resulting by election was the first electoral test for Traditional Unionist Voice. Against expectations, the UUP held the seat.

Dromore By-Election – 14 February 2008
Party	Candidate	Count 1	Count 2	Count 3	Count 4	Count 5
DUP	Paul Stewart	1069	1074	1127	1178	1508
UUP	Carol Black	912	937	1119	1194	1571
TUV	Keith Harbinson	739	742	801	828	-828
Alliance	David Griffin	357	479	-479		
Sinn Féin	Paul Gribben	350	507	567	-567	
SDLP	John Drake	290	-290			
Green (NI)	Helen Corry	59	-59			
Electorate=9688, valid=3776, spoiled=17, quota=1889

== Parliamentary and assembly representation ==
In elections for the Westminster Parliament and Northern Ireland Assembly the district was split between the Upper Bann (Ballydown, Banbridge West, Edenderry, Fort, Gilford, Lawrencetown, Loughbrickland, Seapatrick, The Cut), the Lagan Valley (Dromore North, Dromore South, Gransha and Quilly) and the South Down (Ballyward, Bannside, Katesbridge and Rathfriland) constituencies.

== Review of local government ==
As part of the review of public administration in Northern Ireland begun in 2002, plans were developed to merge Banbridge District Council with neighbouring council areas. According to the first seven-council model, announced in late 2005, it was proposed that Banbridge District should be merged with three other councils (Armagh, Craigavon and Newry and Mourne). In June 2007 a second, 11-council reform proposal was announced according to which most of the area covered by Banbridge District would be merged with Armagh City and District Council and Craigavon Borough Council. While some aspects of the review of public administration proceeded that will affect the character of local councils in Northern Ireland, for example the transfer of the majority of planning functions from central government to district councils, the plans for local government amalgamation were put on hold. Amalgamation ultimately took place on 1 April 2015.

== Local media ==
The district was served by four local newspapers: the Banbridge Chronicle (established 1870), the Dromore Leader, the Banbridge Leader, and the County Down Outlook (established 1940). A year-round community radio station, 102.4 Shine FM, was also broadcast from Banbridge. Since 2007, a second community radio station, called fUSe FM, based in Rathfriland also operated, though for a limited number of days each year.

== Banbridge district and the Troubles ==
Like all other parts of Northern Ireland, Banbridge District was not unaffected by the Troubles. Between 1969 and 2001 twelve individuals (six Catholic, six Protestant) lost their lives in the district as a result of the Troubles: Patrick Campbell in 1973, Joseph Toland in 1975, William, Elizabeth, and Noleen Herron, and Barry O’Dowd in 1976, Robert Harrison in 1977, Alan McCrum in 1982, John Bell in 1985, Terence Delaney in 1988, and Patrick Feeny and Loughlin Maginn in 1989. During the Troubles two bombs exploded in the district, both in Banbridge. The first was in 1982, as a result of which Alan McCrum died. Two weeks before the Omagh bombing, on 1 August 1998, a second car bomb planted by the Real IRA exploded in Banbridge town centre. While this second bomb caused a great deal of structural damage, no one was killed.

== Railways ==
Scarva railway station is on the Dublin-Belfast railway line and is often passed at speed by the Enterprise. The Enterprise runs between Belfast Grand Central., Portadown then fast to Newry and on via principal stations to Dublin Connolly. NI Railways however operate a service from Newry calling at local stations including Poyntzpass and Scarva to Portadown and additional stations to Belfast Grand Central.

== See also ==
- Local government in Northern Ireland
