= Newry Canal =

Canal in Northern Ireland

Coordinates: 54°06′N 6°18′W

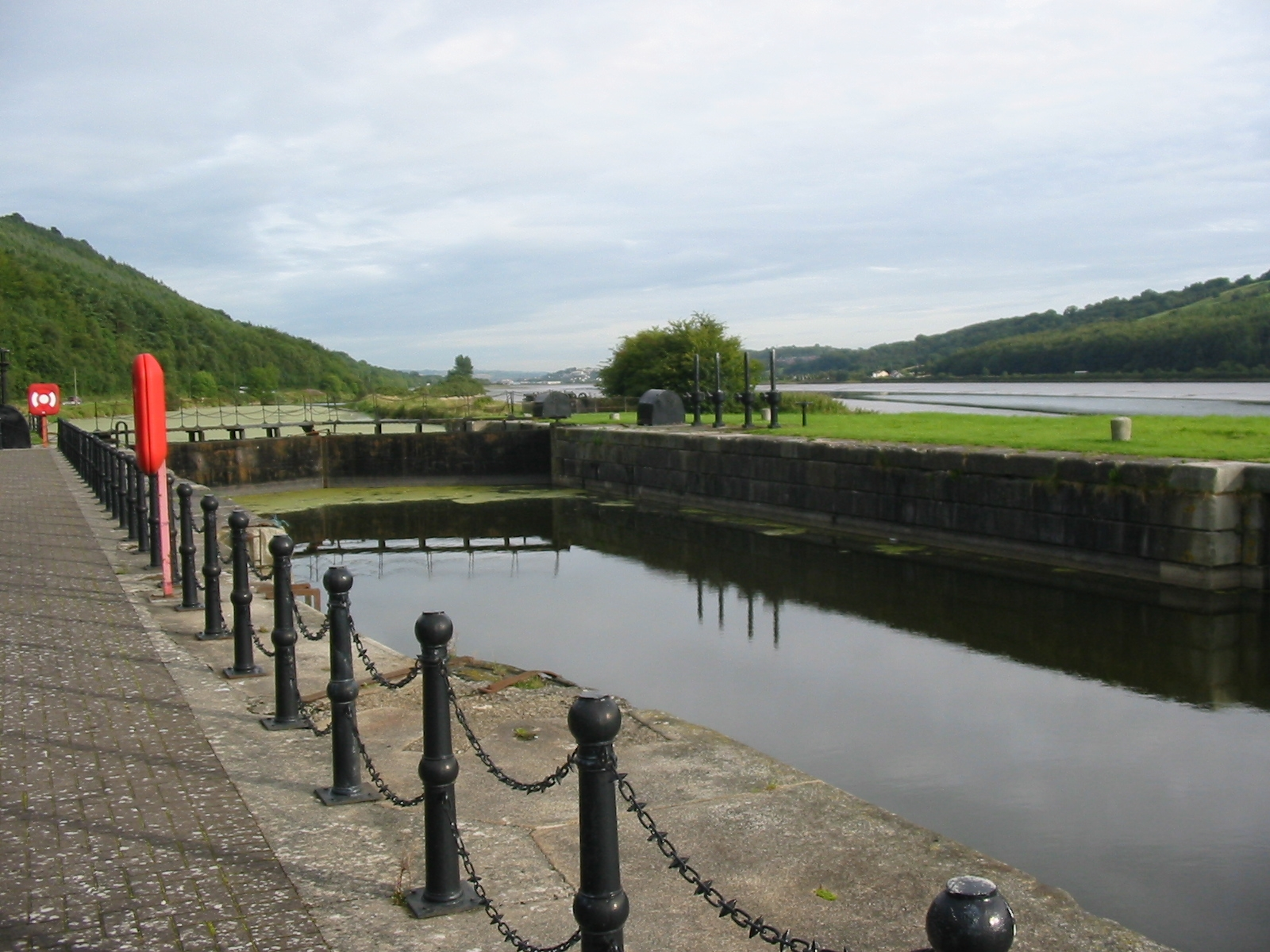
- Victoria Lock at the entrance to Newry ship canal in Carlingford Lough
- Interactive map of Newry Canal

Specifications
- Maximum boat length: 13.4 m (43 ft 11.6 in)
- Maximum boat beam: 15.47 m (50 ft 9 in)
- Locks: 14 (originally 13)
- Maximum height above sea level: 23.8 m (78 ft)
- Status: abandoned

History
- Principal engineer: Edward Lovett Pearce, Richard Castle, Thomas Steers
- Date completed: 1741
- Date closed: 1949, 1970s

Geography
- Start point: Newry
- End point: Portadown

The Newry Canal is an abandoned canal in Northern Ireland. Opened in 1742, it was built to link the Tyrone coalfields to the Irish Sea. The navigable route ran from Lough Neagh via the Upper Bann river to Portadown (approximated 9 miles), then approximately 20 miles from Portadown via the canal proper to Newry, terminating in the Albert Basin.

The canal was closed to navigation in 1949, however its line remains intact and the towpath is currently part of the National Cycle Network and the Ulster Way long distance footpath.

The Newry Ship Canal (opened in 1769), runs approximately 3½ miles south from Newry's Albert Basin to connect with the sea at Carlingford Lough. The Newry Ship Canal remains navigable by pleasure craft today.

== History ==
The Newry Canal was the first summit level canal to be built in Ireland or Great Britain, and pre-dated the more famous Bridgewater Canal by nearly thirty years and Sankey Canal by fifteen years. It was authorised by the Commissioners of Inland Navigation for Ireland, and was publicly funded. It was opened in 1742, but there were issues with the lock construction, the width of the summit level and the water supply.

Originally goods from the Newry Canal were transhipped at Newry's Albert Basin onto seagoing vessels on the adjacent Newry River, from where they could proceed via Carlingford Lough to the Irish Sea. However the Newry River was restricted in the size of vessel it could accommodate. To enhance the capacity of the navigation, the Newry Ship Canal was constructed, running a further 3½ miles south from Albert Basin to the deeper waters of Carlingford Lough. The Ship Canal opened in 1769, and both Newry and the canal flourished.

By 1800, the Newry Canal was in a poor condition, and another £57,000 of public money was spent refurbishing it over the following ten years. Closures during the refurbishment resulted in a loss of traffic, which did not fully recover. In 1829, both canals were transferred to a private company, who spent £80,000 on improvements over the next twenty years. The ship canal was enlarged in 1884, to allow ships of 5,000 tons to reach Newry. It reverted to public ownership in 1901, when the Newry Port and Harbour Authority was created. The canal closed in 1936 and most of it was officially abandoned in 1949, with some in 1956. The ship canal closed as a commercial operation in 1966 and the Authority was wound up in 1974.

Two sections of the redundant canal were bought by local authorities, for two pounds each, and the middle section was given to another two local authorities. The Ship Canal has been reopened for use by pleasure craft, and there have been attempts to reopen the Newry Canal, which have not yet been successful. The towpath has become part of a long-distance footpath and also part of the National Cycle Network. Some restoration has taken place, and the canal has become a haven for wildlife. Parts of it are also used for coarse fishing and as the primary base for Newry Rowing Club.

=== Origins ===
Whether or not the usefulness of a navigable route from the inland lake of Lough Neagh to Carlingford Lough, on the coast to the south of Lough Neagh was considered before the 1640s is unknown, but during Oliver Cromwell's campaign in Ireland at that time, a survey of the area was made, and Colonel Monk ordered that a navigable trench from Portadown to Newry should be cut. Despite the order, no work was carried out, nor was it when Francis Nevil, a tax collector for the government, made a similar survey and proposal in 1703. Shortly afterwards, the Tyrone coalfield was discovered, and there was pressure to provide a route for the coal to reach Dublin. A bill was put before Parliament in 1715, for works to improve drainage and the carriage of goods, but failed to become an act of Parliament, and there was a gradual realisation that a local area such as this could provide neither the capital nor the expertise for such undertakings. In order to address the situation, the Irish Parliament in 1717 offered a reward of £1,000 to the first person to produce 500 tons of native coal in Dublin and the Commissioners of Inland Navigation for Ireland were set up in 1729, consisting of three high officials from the government, four bishops, and eighty responsible persons, who would oversee all matters concerned with inland waterways.

With the hope that a good transport route from the Tyrone coalfields to Dublin could result in the city becoming self-sufficient in coal, rather than having to rely on imports from Great Britain, which were often intermittent, the canal was approved by the commissioners. Work did not begin immediately, as Thomas Burgh was Surveyor General, and he had interests in the collieries at Ballycastle, which would be affected by Tyrone coal becoming more generally available. Burgh died in 1730, to be succeeded by Edward Lovett Pearce, and work began on the canal in 1731. Although Pearce was officially running the scheme, he was busy constructing the new Parliament House at the time, and gave the task to one of his architectural assistants, Richard Cassels. Cassels had escaped from the religious persecution of the Huguenots in France, and had travelled in Germany, the Low Countries and England, where he had studied navigation works, before arriving in Ireland to work for Pearce. At the time he was known as Richard Castle, but reverted to his original name as his stature as an architect grew.

With the death of Pearce in 1733, Cassels became the engineer for the project, which included building the first navigation lock in Ireland. He was discharged in 1736, probably because he was paying more attention to the architectural commissions he had taken over from Pearce. He was replaced by Thomas Steers, who employed a local man called William Gilbert to oversee the work, which was completed by 1741. Legal disputes delayed the official opening until 1742, and a barge loaded with coal from the Tyrone coalfields reached Dublin on 28 March 1742, although the first part or the journey had involved carriage of the coal overland to Lough Neagh, as the Tyrone Navigation, begun in 1732, was far from complete. The Newry Canal has 14 locks, nine of them to the south of the summit, which is 23.8 metres (78 ft) above the level of Carlingford Lough. The locks are 13.3 metres (44 ft) long and 4.7 metres (15.5 ft) wide. They were 3.7 to 4.0 metres (12 to 13 ft) deep and each lock was faced with stone from the Benburb quarries early in the 1800s after the original brick sides began to crumble.

Despite the manager, Acheson Johnston, having to report to Parliament in 1750 that there were defective locks, water shortage problems and issues with the width of the summit section, the merchants of Newry were keen to develop the town as a port, and obtained a government grant to build a ship canal to the town. The first contractor, John Golbourne from Chester, was dismissed, and Thomas Omer took over as engineer. The Commissioners of Inland Navigation had invited him to Ireland in 1755, and there is some evidence that he worked on river navigations in England after arriving there from the Holland, but his work was not of a high standard, and created problems for those following him. Omer ignored the previously planned route, and created a 3.2-kilometre (2 mi) ship canal which could accommodate boats of up to 120 tonnes. Newry flourished as a port after its completion in 1769, as did trade on the Newry Canal, although it was largely grain and general merchandise, rather than the coal for which it had been designed. The canal also assisted the development of the Tyrone linen industry and the production of butter for export.

=== Operation ===
Despite its shortcomings, the canal was earning around £7,000 per year from tolls by the 1790s. However, the canal was being run by local people who had taken over the canal after the commissioners were dismissed, and they failed to invest in its improvement or maintenance. By 1800 it was in a ruinous state, and the Director General took control. Henry Walker, an engineer, was asked to put it back into good order, but was imprisoned and then deported to America for acting fraudulently. John Brownrigg then produced a detailed report of its condition, in which he suggested it would be cheaper to build a new canal than repair the existing one, but his advice was ignored. As the refurbishment involved the rebuilding of many bridges and locks, widening and deepening the summit level, there were long periods where the canal was effectively closed. The water supply was improved, and the ship lock was restored, but inevitably, closures resulted in traffic transferring to road transport, and it proved difficult to attract it back to the canal, once the work was completed in 1811.

Between 1818 and 1827, the canal collected tolls of £2,546 per year, and its reserves rose from £8,520 in 1800 to £28,000 in 1829. If the £57,000 of public money spent on its restoration was ignored, it made a modest profit. William Dawson introduced a private passenger service from Portadown to Newry in 1813, and although he was always asking for the tolls to be reduced, the service continued for many years. Although the Tyrone Navigation had finally opened in 1787, this did not result in coal traffic using the canal. The importance of Newry as a port declined as Belfast became more prominent, and the ship canal could not cope with the increasing size of ships as sail was replaced by steam. Various engineers were consulted, including John Brownrigg, Sir John Rennie and Alexander Nimmo. All suggested that a larger sea lock was required in deeper water, and that the ship canal needed to be enlarged.

In 1829, the government agreed to transfer both the ship canal and the Newry Canal to a private company, whose chairman was the Marquess of Downshire. The Directors General objected, as they had not been consulted, and felt that it was wrong to transfer an undertaking that had been built using public money to a private company. However, the company agreed to spend £80,000 on improvements over the following twenty years, and kept their word. By 1850, a new sea lock had been built, some 2.4 kilometres (1.5 mi) further down the estuary, which doubled the size of ships that could use it. The river had been dredged, and the Albert Basin had been constructed at Newry. The Newry Canal also benefitted, with receipts rising to £3,500 per year, resulting from the tonnage carried doubling to over 100,000 tons per year.

=== Decline ===
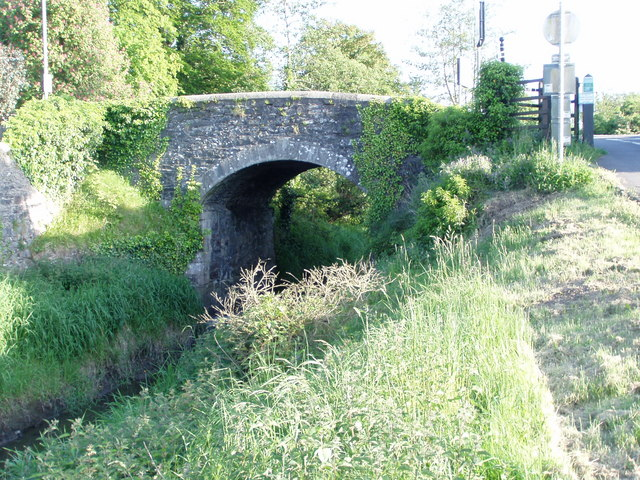
Scarva canal bridge.

With the coming of the railways in the 1850s, the canal went into decline. The railway line from Belfast to Dublin opened in 1852, and ran parallel to the canal for much of its length. Newry was integrated into the system by the construction of a short branch line, and in 1865 a link from Newry to the Ulster Railway at Armagh was completed. Newry prospered as a port, with traffic passing through it more than trebling from 103,560 tons in 1831 to 363,558 tons in 1888, but in the same period, traffic on the canal halved from 70,749 tons to 33,500 tons. The owning company was still saddled with debts from the engineering projects carried out since 1829, and coal traffic from the Tyrone collieries had all but ceased. Despite this, there was still some traffic on the canal, most of it passing northwards from Newry, including imported coal, timber and heavy goods, where the canal remained competitive with the railways.

Newry Navigation Act 1884
- Act of Parliament
- Parliament of the United Kingdom
- Long title: An Act to confer further powers on the Newry Navigation Company and for other purposes.
- Citation: 47 & 48 Vict. c. cxxxviii

Dates
- Royal assent: 14 July 1884

Text of statute as originally enacted

In 1884, the company carried out its last major engineering project, when the upper reaches of Carlingford Lough and the lower Newry River were made deeper, and the navigable channel widened to 37 metres (120 ft). This allowed ships of up to 5,000 tons to reach Newry. The project cost £55,000, and was authorised by the Newry Navigation Act 1884 (47 & 48 Vict. c. cxxxviii). There were plans to extend the Clogher Valley Railway to Newry in 1900, but those proposing the scheme realised that the Newry Navigation Company would object to the scheme, and relationships between the canal company and Newry Urban Council were already strained. The railway scheme was thus dropped, after which the promoters and council jointly approached the canal company, with a plan to buy out the company and create a public corporation, in which the interests of the town and port would be adequately represented. The Newry Port and Harbour Trust was established in 1901, and the Newry Canal made a small profit until the First World War. Afterwards, maintenance costs swamped any income received, and the last recorded commercial traffic was in 1936. The Northern Ireland administration had no interest in canals, and a warrant of abandonment was issued on 7 May 1949, which covered all but the Newry town section, which was similarly abandoned on 21 March 1956. Soon the swing bridges in Newry were replaced by fixed bridges, cutting off the canal from the sea, and the ship canal was closed in 1966 when Warrenpoint replaced the port of Newry. The Newry Port and Harbour Trust was wound up in 1974.

== Ownership and restoration ==
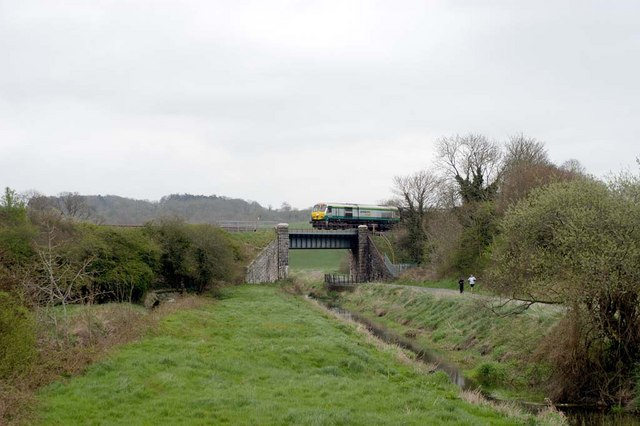
The Enterprise crossing the Newry Canal.

In 1974, liquidators handling the disposal of the Newry Port and Harbour Trust's assets approached the local councils, and Newry and Mourne District Council bought the ship canal and the section of the Newry Canal which was within its jurisdiction for two pounds. Craigavon Borough Council bought the northern section for another two pounds in the early 1980s, and the middle section was given to Armagh City and District Council and Banbridge District Council in 1992.

Following the creation of Northern Ireland's 'super-councils' in 2015, the canal is owned by Newry, Mourne and Down District Council (NMD Council) and Armagh City, Banbridge and Craigavon Borough Council (ABC Council) respectively. The NMD Council, for example, is responsible for the section of canal from Victoria Lock to just outside Jerrettspass village.

=== Redevelopment ===
The Newry Canal was one of the first of the waterways of Northern Ireland to be considered for restoration. A plan was costed in 1980, and an attempt to secure Millennium Lottery funding was made in 1996, but failed due to the lack of matched funding. The proposals involved using the existing course for most of the route, but bypassing the fixed bridges of Newry by using the Clanrye River, which would involve building one or two new locks.

Moneypenny's Lock (No. 14), which was named after the lock-keepers who lived there for over 80 years, has been restored by Craigavon Borough Council. Banbridge District Council maintain a small museum at Scarva.

The Ship Canal and sea lock were restored by Newry and Mourne District Council. It now provides access for leisure craft visiting Newry. It is suitable for boats up to 61 metres (200 ft) by 10 metres (33 ft) with a draught of up to 3.4 metres (11 ft). Victoria Lock, where the ship canal joins the sea, is tidal, and was automated in May 2007.

Since closure, some sections have fallen into a state of disrepair. Although most of the lock gates have long since rotted away, many of the locks themselves are in good condition, being constructed from local Mourne granite. It is now overgrown for much of its length; however, this means that it is now home to wildlife. This includes larger mammals like otters, and the Brackagh Bog area provides habitat for several species which are not found elsewhere in Northern Ireland, including plants, damselflies, dragonflies and 19 species of butterflies. There is a flow of fresh water along the canal, and good stocks of fish. Coarse fishing for perch, roach, bream and pike is possible on the River Bann, on the ship canal, and on parts of the canal, although the lower sections are choked with weed. The towpath has been reopened and is maintained by two wardens throughout the year. It is now part of the Ulster Way long-distance footpath, and has been incorporated into the National Cycle Network's Route 9 which will eventually link Belfast with Dublin.

== Railway access ==
The Belfast–Newry railway line provides access for walkers to the canal at the Northern Ireland Railways stations of Portadown, Scarva and Poyntzpass.

== See also ==
- Canals of Ireland
- Canals of the United Kingdom

== Bibliography ==
- Cumberlidge, Jane (2002). The Inland Waterways of Ireland. Imray Laurie Norie and Wilson. ISBN 978-0-85288-424-9.
- Delany, Ruth (2004). Ireland's Inland Waterways. Appletree Press. ISBN 978-0-86281-824-1.
- McCutcheon, W A (1965). The Canals of the North of Ireland. David and Charles. ISBN 978-0-7153-4028-8.
- Skempton, Sir Alec; et al. (2002). A Biographical Dictionary of Civil Engineers in Great Britain and Ireland: Vol 1: 1500 to 1830. Thomas Telford. ISBN 978-0-7277-2939-2.
