= Tanderagee railway station =

Disused railway station in County Armagh, Northern Ireland

Tanderagee
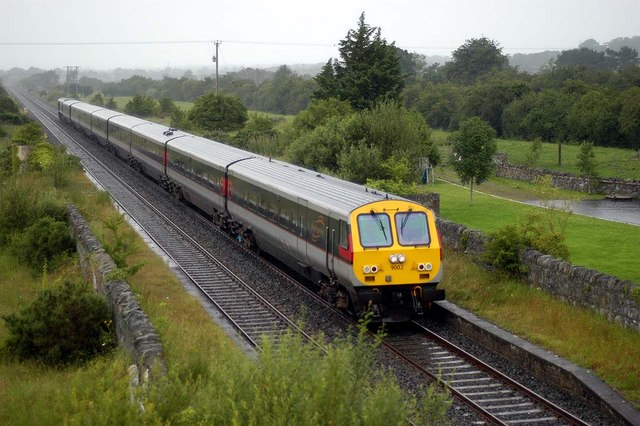
- Remains of Tanderagee railway station

General information
- Location: Madden Road, near Tandragee and Gilford; County Armagh; Northern Ireland
- Coordinates: 54.363939°N 6.384293°W
- Line: Dublin–Belfast railway line
- Platforms: 2
- Tracks: 2

Construction
- Structure type: At-grade

History
- Former names: Madden Bridge; Tanderagee and Gilford; Tandragee
- Original company: Dublin and Belfast Junction Railway
- Pre-grouping: Great Northern Railway (Ireland)
- Post-grouping: Ulster Transport Authority

Key dates
- 6 January 1852: Opened as Madden Bridge
- 1876: Became part of the Great Northern Railway (Ireland)
- 1958: Transferred to the Ulster Transport Authority
- 4 January 1965: Closed to passengers

Historical railways
Preceding station	Historical railways	Following station
Scarva; Line and station open	Dublin and Belfast Junction Railway; Portadown–Drogheda	Portadown; Line and station open
Scarva; Line and station open	Great Northern Railway (Ireland); Belfast–Dublin	Portadown; Line and station open
Scarva; Line and station open	Ulster Transport Authority; Belfast–Dublin (1958–1965)	Portadown; Line and station open
Route map
Location
- Location within Northern Ireland Location within island of Ireland

Tanderagee railway station was a railway station on the Dublin–Belfast railway line, situated on Madden Road between Tandragee, County Armagh, and Gilford, County Down, Northern Ireland. It opened on 6 January 1852 and closed to passengers on 4 January 1965.

== History ==
=== Opening and railway operations ===
The station opened on 6 January 1852 under the Dublin and Belfast Junction Railway, initially carrying the name Madden Bridge. It was subsequently known as Tanderagee and Gilford, reflecting the two nearby settlements served by the station.

The station's name was recorded under different spellings throughout its history, including Tandragee and Tanderagee. Contemporary railway timetables and official publications used both forms. By the time of its closure in 1965, the station was officially known as Tanderagee.

Following the amalgamation of several railway companies in 1876, the station became part of the Great Northern Railway (Ireland). It subsequently passed to the Ulster Transport Authority following the dissolution of the Great Northern Railway Board in 1958.

During the Second World War, the station served as an important transport point for British and American military personnel travelling to bases and accommodation in the Tandragee and Gilford areas. Thousands of troops used the station during the war, particularly during the period of increased Allied military activity in Northern Ireland.

The station closed to regular passenger services on 4 January 1965, during a period of railway rationalisation in Northern Ireland.

The station buildings were subsequently demolished, although the two former platforms remain visible beside the operational railway line. The former station house survives as a private dwelling.

On 30 September 1995, a special railtour organised by the Modern Railway Society of Ireland made a photographic stop at the disused station.

The Dublin–Belfast railway line remains operational through the former station site, with trains including the Enterprise passing through without stopping.
