= Scarva railway station =

Railway station in Northern Ireland

Scarva
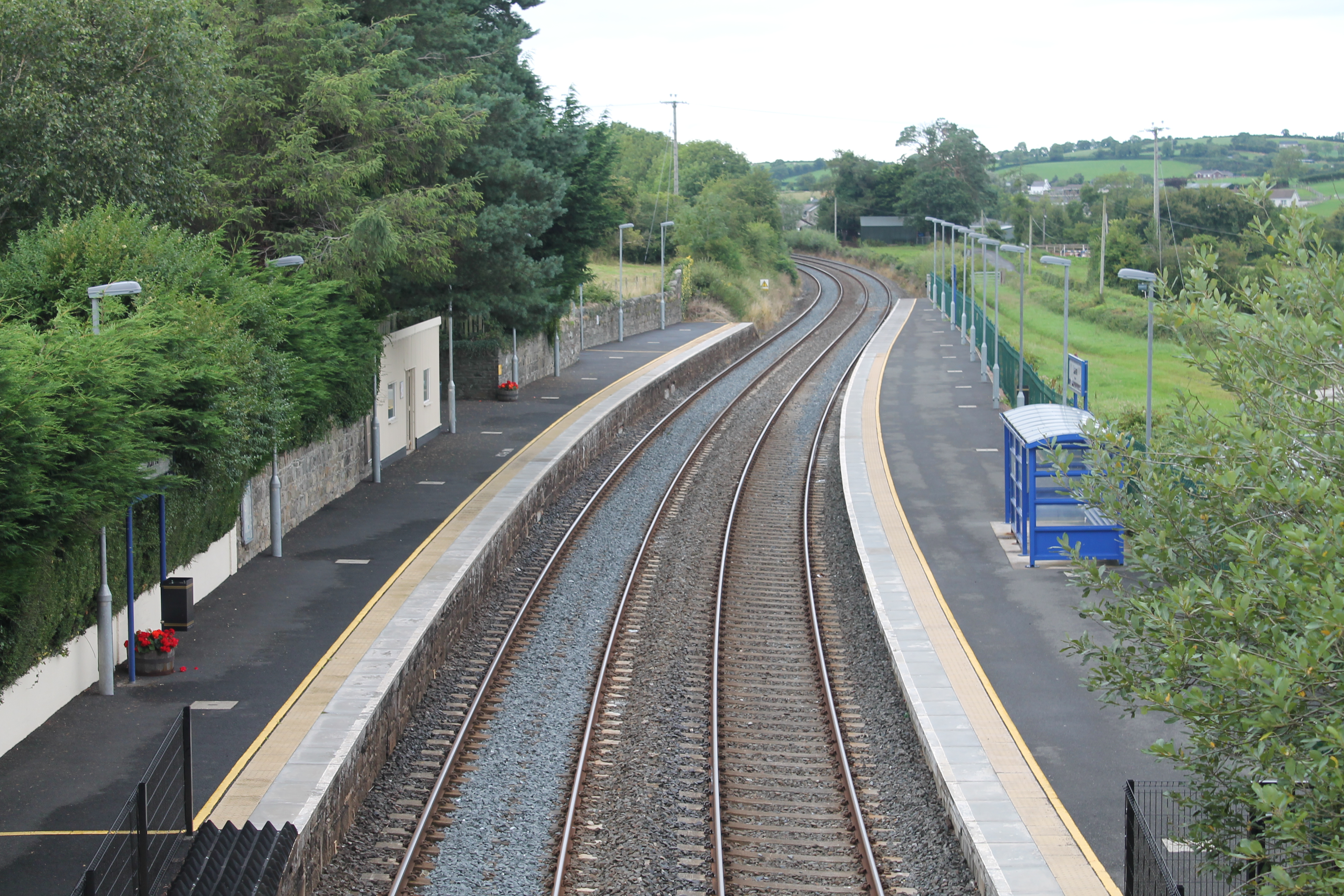
- Scarva station in 2013

General information
- Location: Scarva; County Down (Station in County Armagh); Northern Ireland
- Coordinates: 54°19′56″N 6°21′59″W
- System: Commuter Rail
- Owner: NI Railways
- Operator: NI Railways
- Line: Dublin–Belfast
- Platforms: 2
- Tracks: 2
- Bus operators: None

Construction
- Structure type: At-grade
- Parking: None

Other information
- Station code: SA
- Fare zone: 4

Key dates
- 1859: Station opened
- 1965: Station closed
- 1984: Station re-opened

Passengers
- 2015/16: 4,860
- 2016/17: ▼4,153
- 2017/18: ▼4,086
- 2018/19: ▲4,367
- 2019/20: ▲4,472
- 2020/21: ▼462
- 2021/22: ▲1,170
- 2022/23: ▲5,060
- 2023/24: ▲6,183
- 2024/25: ▼5,975
- 2025/26: ▲6,356

Services
Preceding station	NI Railways	Following station
Poyntzpass towards Newry	Portadown Line	Portadown towards Belfast Grand Central

Historical railways
Preceding station	Historical railways	Following station
Poyntzpass; Line and station open	Dublin and Belfast Junction Railway; Portadown–Drogheda	Tanderagee; Line open, station closed
Terminus	Banbridge Junction Railway; Scarva–Banbridge	Laurencetown; Line and station closed
Poyntzpass; Line and station open	Great Northern Railway (Ireland); Belfast–Dublin	Tanderagee; Line open, station closed
Terminus	Great Northern Railway (Ireland); Scarva–Banbridge	Laurencetown; Line and station closed
- NI Railways; Translink; NI railway stations
Route map
(Click to expand)
Location
- Location within Northern Ireland Location within island of Ireland

Scarva railway station serves the small village of Scarva in County Down, Northern Ireland. Despite serving the County Down village, the station itself is in County Armagh, the nearby Newry Canal being the boundary.

The station is the second least-used station in Northern Ireland after Poyntzpass, with only 5,975 passengers using the station in the 2024/25 financial year.

The station, which is unstaffed, has no ticket machines, so tickets must be purchased from a conductor after boarding a train. Scarva and Poyntzpass stations are the only stations in Northern Ireland without ticket machines.

On platform 2 there is a very old stone waiting shelter which is still in use, but on platform 1 there is a modern Translink branded one.

The platforms are not long enough to accommodate 6-carriage trains, so only 3-carriage trains stop at the station. Platform 1 is used for Southbound trains and platform 2 for Northbound ones.

== History ==
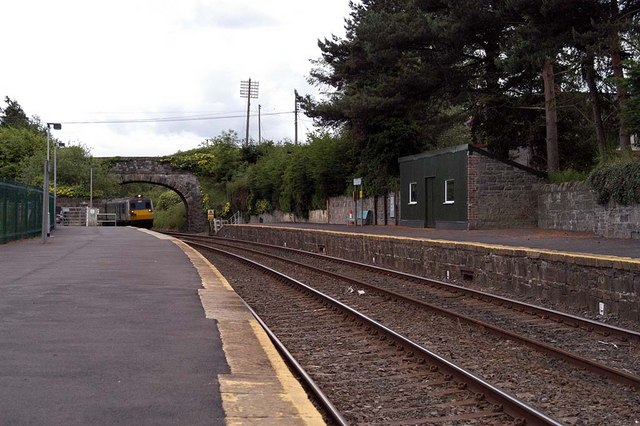
Scarva station with an N.I.R. 80 Class in the distance, 2005

The station opened on 23 March 1859. The station was formerly the junction for the G.N.R.(I). branch to Banbridge which opened in 1859 and closed on 2 May 1965. Scarva station was closed between 1965 and 1984.

== Service ==
There is a limited service from the station with four trains towards Newry, Portadown or Belfast Grand Central on Mondays to Saturdays only.

There is no Sunday service.

Scarva railway station is on the Belfast-Dublin railway line and so Enterprise services pass through the station between Belfast Grand Central & Dublin Connolly.
