= Poyntzpass railway station =

Railway station in Poyntzpass, Northern Ireland

Poyntzpass
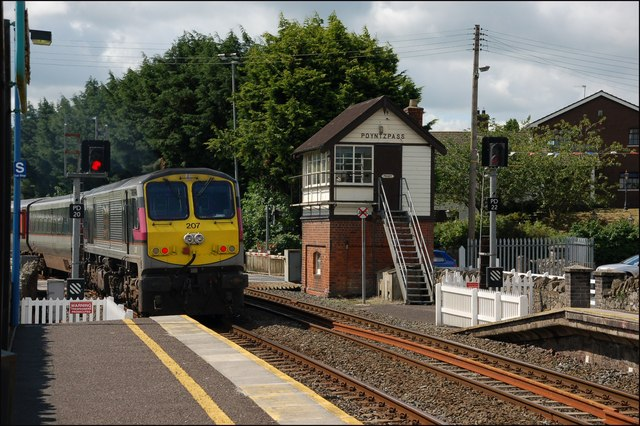
- Enterprise train passing Poyntzpass station in 2007

General information
- Location: Poyntzpass; County Armagh; Northern Ireland
- Coordinates: 54.2924°N 6.3720°W
- System: Commuter Rail
- Owner: NI Railways
- Operator: NI Railways
- Line: Dublin–Belfast
- Distance: Belfast Lanyon Place: 36½ Miles; Dublin Connolly: 77 miles
- Platforms: 2
- Tracks: 2
- Bus operators: None

Construction
- Structure type: At-grade
- Parking: None

Other information
- Station code: PS
- Fare zone: 4

Key dates
- 1862: Station opened
- 1965: Station closed
- 1984: Station re-opened

Passengers
- 2015/16: 1,452
- 2016/17: ▲1,569
- 2017/18: ▼1,191
- 2018/19: ▲1,819
- 2019/20: ▲1,950
- 2020/21: ▼717
- 2021/22: ▲970
- 2022/23: ▲2,037
- 2023/24: ▲2,362
- 2024/25: ▼1,730
- 2025/26: ▲2,843

Services
Preceding station	NI Railways	Following station
Newry Terminus	Portadown Line	Scarva towards Portadown or Belfast Grand Central

Historical railways
Preceding station	Historical railways	Following station
Goraghwood; Line open, station closed	Dublin and Belfast Junction Railway; Portadown–Drogheda	Scarva; Line and station open
Goraghwood; Line open, station closed	Great Northern Railway (Ireland); Belfast–Dublin	Scarva; Line and station open
- NI Railways; Translink; NI railway stations
Route map
(Click to expand)
Location
- Location within Northern Ireland Location within island of Ireland

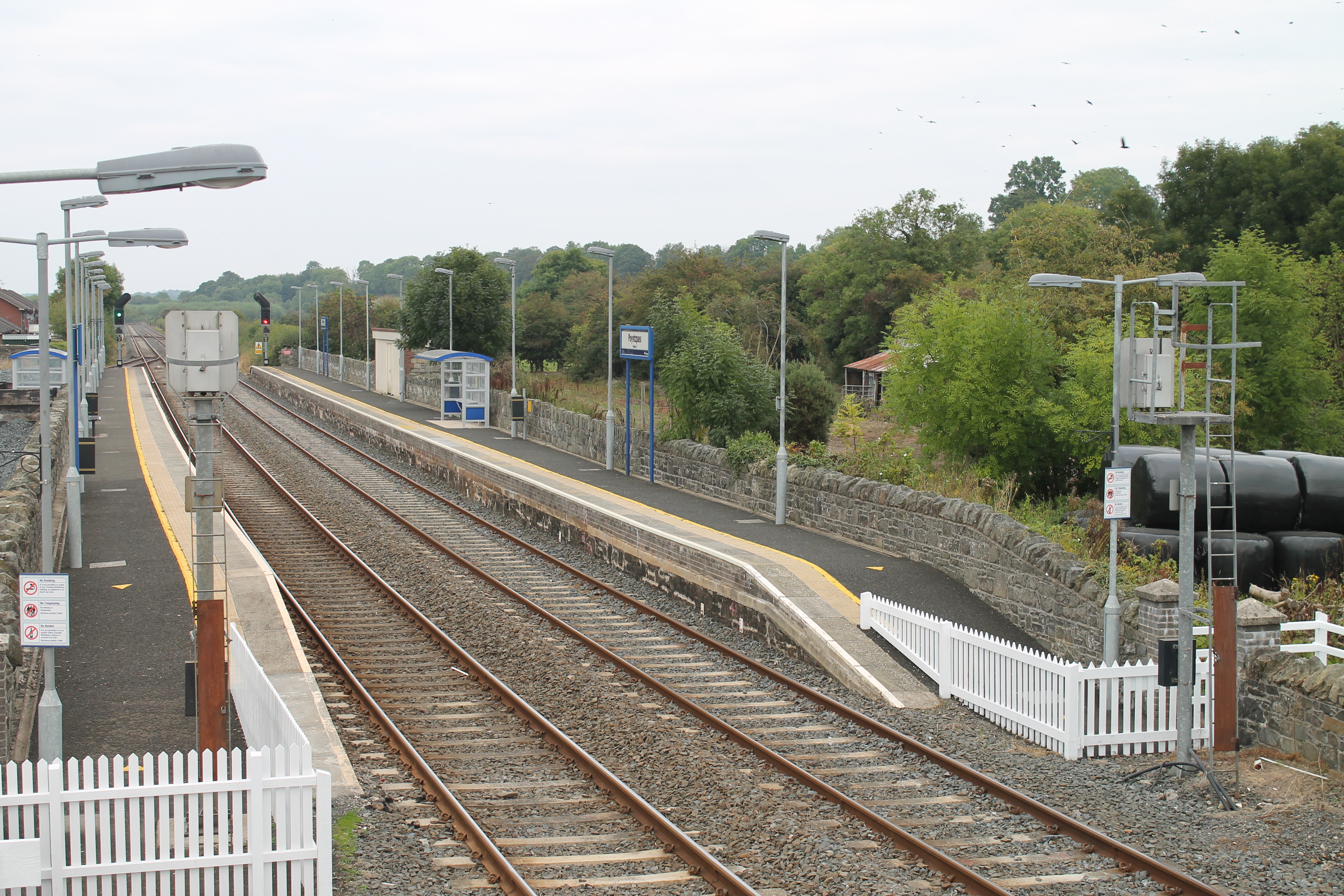
Poyntzpass station, as seen from the disused signal cabin

Poyntzpass railway station serves the village of Poyntzpass in County Armagh, Northern Ireland.

Poyntzpass is the least-used railway station in Northern Ireland, with just 2,843 passengers boarding or alighting at the station in the 2025/26 financial year. Platform 1 is used for Southbound trains and platform 2 is used for Northbound trains.

Poyntzpass and Scarva Train stations have ticket machines.

There is a level crossing at the southern end of the station, alongside a signal cabin which is now disused but preserved.

On platform 1 there is a stone waiting shelter with origins tracing back to the Great Northern Railway (Ireland) which is now locked shut so it cannot be used, but both platforms now have modern Translink branded waiting shelters.

There is also a siding next to platform 2 where ballast hoppers are stored and occasionally ballast trains operate to and from the station typically hauled by an N.I.R. 111 Class or I.É 201 Class locomotive.

== History ==
The station was opened on 6 January 1852. It was closed by the Ulster Transport Authority in 1965, and reopened (as an unmanned stop) in 1984 by Northern Ireland Railways.

== Service ==
As of late 2026, there is a limited service from the station, with five trains towards Newry and four towards Belfast Grand Central or Portadown on Mondays to Fridays; four trains towards Newry and three towards Belfast or Portadown on Saturdays; and no services on Sundays.

Poyntzpass railway station is on the Belfast-Dublin railway line and so Enterprise services pass through the station operating between Belfast Grand Central and Dublin Connolly.
