= Gilford, County Down =

Village in County Down, Northern Ireland

Coordinates: 54.372879°N 6.359289°W

Gilford: Irish: Áth Mhic Giolla
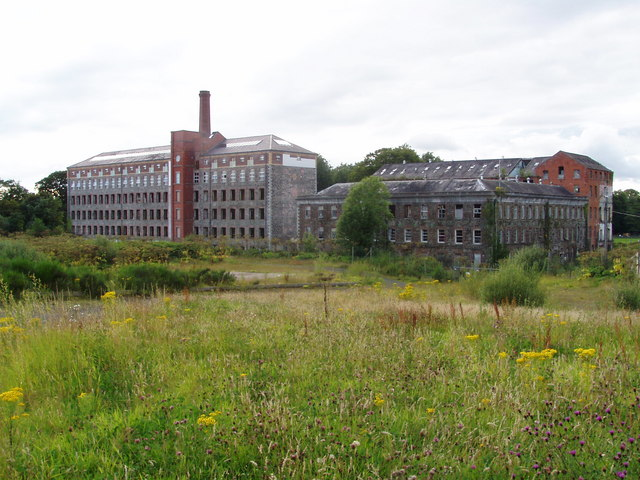
- The old Gilford Mill

- Location within County Down
- Population: 1,957
- District: Armagh, Banbridge and Craigavon
- County: County Down
- Country: Northern Ireland
- Sovereign state: United Kingdom
- Post town: CRAIGAVON
- Postcode district: BT63
- Dialling code: 028

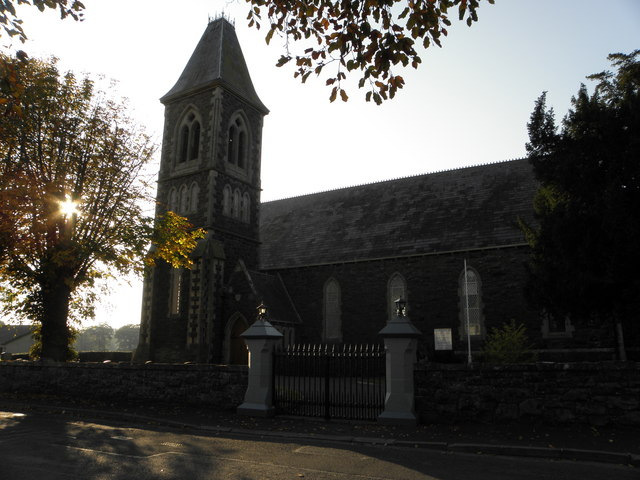
All Saints Church, Gilford

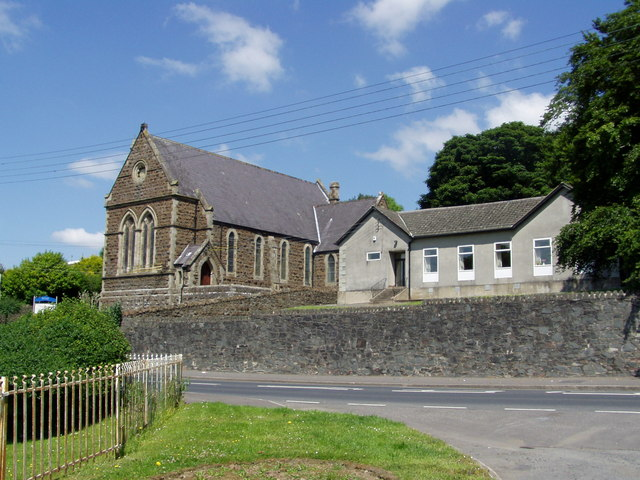
St Paul's Church of Ireland, Gilford

Gilford is a village in County Down, Northern Ireland. The village sits on the River Bann between the towns of Banbridge, Tandragee and Portadown. It covers the townlands of Loughans, Ballymacanallen and Drumaran. It had a population of 1,957 people in the 2021 census. Gilford is in the Armagh, Banbridge and Craigavon district.

== History ==
Following the Irish Rebellion of 1641, Captain John Magill acquired land in the parish of Tullylish and founded Gilford, the name of the village being derived from "Magill’s ford". He afterwards became Sir John Magill and built Gill Hall in Dromore, County Down.

The Magill lands passed by marriage to the Meade family, who were made Barons Gillford in 1766 and later earls of Clanwilliam. In the 19th century, Gilford grew and its population swelled when a linen mill was built. Many mill houses can still be found in the village. When the mill shut in 1986, the village waned. Recently though, the village had started to recover and new shops had opened, then since closed, currently only 2 shops and 2 pubs still stand. At the edge of the village is Gilford Castle, a mansion built in 1865 to the designs of architect William Spence.

Tanderagee and Gilford railway station was opened in 1852 to serve the villages. It closed in 1965.

== Education ==
There are two schools in the area: Gilford Primary School and St John's Primary School. The schools are within the Southern Education and Library Board area. There is a nursery located in Gilford Primary School.

== Sport ==
Gilford Boxing Club has produced a number of All-Ireland winners. It is situated in the old church hall beside Gilford chapel.

Gilford Crusaders Football Club play in the Mid-Ulster Football League. Their badge depicts a Christian Crusader with a sword and shield. The clubs' home matches take place at Woodlands Park. Gilford Crusaders won the coveted Mid-Ulster Cup in 1935.

Millpark Cricket Club was a cricket club in Gilford, County Down, that last played in Section 2 of the NCU Senior League. The club, originally based at Millpark, an area located between Gilford and Banbridge, moved the short distance to its second and final home Banford Green, in 1969.[1] In 2017, the club merged with Donaghcloney Cricket Club under the name Donaghcloney Mill Cricket Club

The local GAA club serving Gilford is Tullylish GAC, with its home ground, Páirc na nÓg. Tullylish GAC represents the broader Tullylish area, The club actively competes in the County Down Leagues and offers a comprehensive structure for Gaelic football, with teams available from under 6 to senior levels. For hurling and camogie, Aghaderg Gaelic Athletic & Ballyvarley Hurling Club serves as the nearest club that offers those codes, and is located approximately three miles from Gilford.

== People ==
- Charlie Gallogly (1919–1993) was a professional footballer in England
- Jude Hill (b. 2010), child actor known for his lead role in Kenneth Branagh's film Belfast (2021).
