= Scarva =

Village in County Down, Northern Ireland

Coordinates: 54.3317°N 6.3646°W

Scarva: Irish: Scarbhach
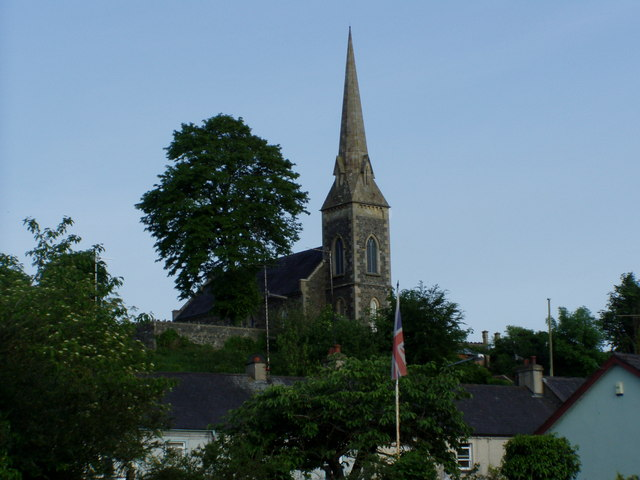
- St Matthew's Church of Ireland, Scarva

- Location within County Down
- Population: 320 (2001 Census)
- Irish grid reference: J063436
  - Belfast: 25 mi (40 km)
- District: Armagh, Banbridge and Craigavon
- County: County Down
- Country: Northern Ireland
- Sovereign state: United Kingdom
- Post town: CRAIGAVON
- Postcode district: BT63
- Dialling code: 028
- Police: Northern Ireland
- Fire: Northern Ireland
- Ambulance: Northern Ireland
- UK Parliament: Upper Bann
- NI Assembly: Upper Bann

Scarva (from Irish Scarbhach meaning "shallow place, rough ford") is a small village and townland in County Down, Northern Ireland. It is at the boundary with County Armagh, which is marked by the Newry Canal. In the 2001 census it had a population of 320.

Scarva is home to the "Sham Fight" Pageant which is held on 13 July every year. The pageant attracts thousands of members of the Royal Black Preceptory, a group related to the Orange Order, who come to march and stage a theatrical (sham) re-enactment of the 1690 Battle of the Boyne.

== History ==
During the Williamite War in Ireland (1689–1691), the forces of Frederick Schomberg reputedly first camped near Scarva, before marching south.

Much of the village was laid-out by John Reilly, owner of Scarvagh House, in the mid-18th century. This included the construction of Scarva's Presbyterian meeting house, which was built in 1753.

In the late 18th century, there were skirmishes in the area involving the Hearts of Steel and Break-of-day Boys.

== Transport ==
Scarva railway station opened on 23 March 1859.

Scarva is on National Cycle Route 9, linking Belfast with Newry, and onwards to Dublin.

== Amenities ==
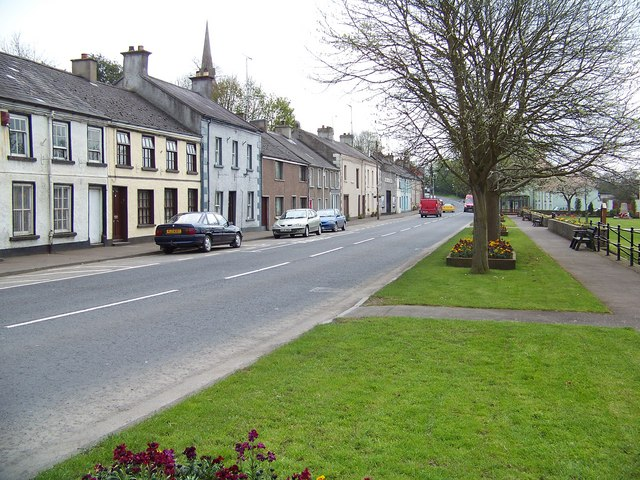
Scarva's main street, 2009

The village has a park, with playing fields and a wildlife pond, scenic walks and wild fowl sanctuary.

The local primary school, Scarva Primary School, had an enrollment of 61 pupils as of 2011.

== Sport ==
The local football club is Scarva Rangers, formed in 1972. Home matches are played at Scarva Park.

== People ==
- William Buller (born 1992), racing driver
