= Dublin and Belfast Junction Railway =

Former Rail operating company in Ireland

Coordinates: 54.595°N 5.915°W

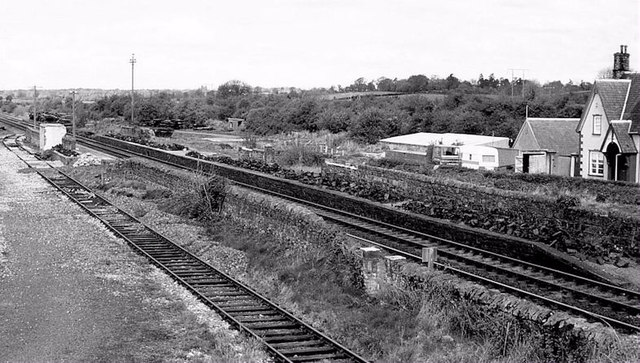
- Tanderagee railway station in 1981 on the Belfast-Newry railway line

Overview
- Status: Closed
- Locale: North of Ireland (geographically, not the nation)

History
- Opened: 1849
- Completed: 1855

Dublin and Belfast Junction and Navan Branch Railway Act 1845
- Act of Parliament
- Parliament of the United Kingdom
- Long title: An Act for making a Railway from Drogheda to Portadown, with a Branch to Navan.
- Citation: 8 & 9 Vict. c. cxxx

Dates
- Royal assent: 21 July 1845

Dublin and Belfast Junction Railway Amendment Act 1847
- Act of Parliament
- Parliament of the United Kingdom
- Long title: An Act to authorize the Sale to the Dublin and Drogheda Railway Company of the Navan Branch of the Dublin and Belfast Junction Railway, and to enable the Dublin and Drogheda, the Dublin and Belfast Junction Railway Company with a Branch from Drogheda to Navan, the Ulster, and the Dundalk and Enniskillen Railway Companies, or any of them to amalgamate with one another.
- Citation: 10 & 11 Vict. c. cxi

Dates
- Royal assent: 2 July 1847

Text of statute as originally enacted

Dublin and Belfast Junction Railway Amendment Act 1853
- Act of Parliament
- Parliament of the United Kingdom
- Long title: An Act to amend the Acts relating to the Dublin and Belfast Junction Railway Company, and for other Purposes.
- Citation: 16 & 17 Vict. c. xix

Dates
- Royal assent: 13 May 1853

Text of statute as originally enacted

Dublin and Belfast Junction Railway Act 1864
- Act of Parliament
- Parliament of the United Kingdom
- Long title: An Act to alter and regulate the Capital and Borrowing Powers of the Dublin and Belfast Junction Railway Company; and for other Purposes.
- Citation: 27 & 28 Vict. c. xii

Dates
- Royal assent: 28 April 1864

The Dublin and Belfast Junction Railway (D&BJct) was an Irish gauge (5 ft 3 in (1,600 mm)) railway in Ireland. The company was incorporated by the Dublin and Belfast Junction and Navan Branch Railway Act 1845 (8 & 9 Vict. c. cxxx) and opened its line in stages between 1849 and 1853, with the final bridge over the River Boyne opening in 1855. It linked the Ulster Railway (UR) from Belfast to Portadown and Dublin and Drogheda Railway (D&D) from Drogheda to Dublin, completing the missing link in the Belfast–Dublin line.

== History ==
The Boyne Viaduct at Drogheda was not built until 1854–55, at a cost of £124,000, to the design of Sir John Macneill, who was the consulting engineer for the D&BJct.

== Route ==
The D&BJct line from Drogheda to Portadown connected the Ulster Railway's Armagh – Portadown – Belfast Great Victoria Street original line with the Dublin and Drogheda Railway's Dublin Amiens Street – Drogheda line, forming the main line between Dublin and Belfast.

== Aftermath ==
In 1875, the D&BJct merged with the Dublin and Drogheda Railway (D&D), forming the Northern Railway of Ireland. This was in turn one of the companies that amalgamated to form the Great Northern Railway of Ireland in 1876.

== See also ==
- Banbridge Junction Railway

== Sources ==
- Ahrons, E.L. (1927). The British Steam Railway Locomotive 1825-1925. Amen Corner, London: Locomotive Publishing Co.
- Ahrons, E. L. (1954). L. L. Asher (ed.). Locomotive and train working in the latter part of the nineteenth century. Vol. six. W Heffer & Sons Ltd.
- Hamond, Fred; Friel, Charles (December 2007). "13 Drogheda–Oldcastle Line". An Industrial Heritage Survey of Railways in Counties Monaghan and Louth (PDF). Monaghan CC & Louth CC (Report). Archived (PDF) from the original on 24 May 2019.
