= Portadown railway station =

Railway station in County Armagh, Northern Ireland

Portadown
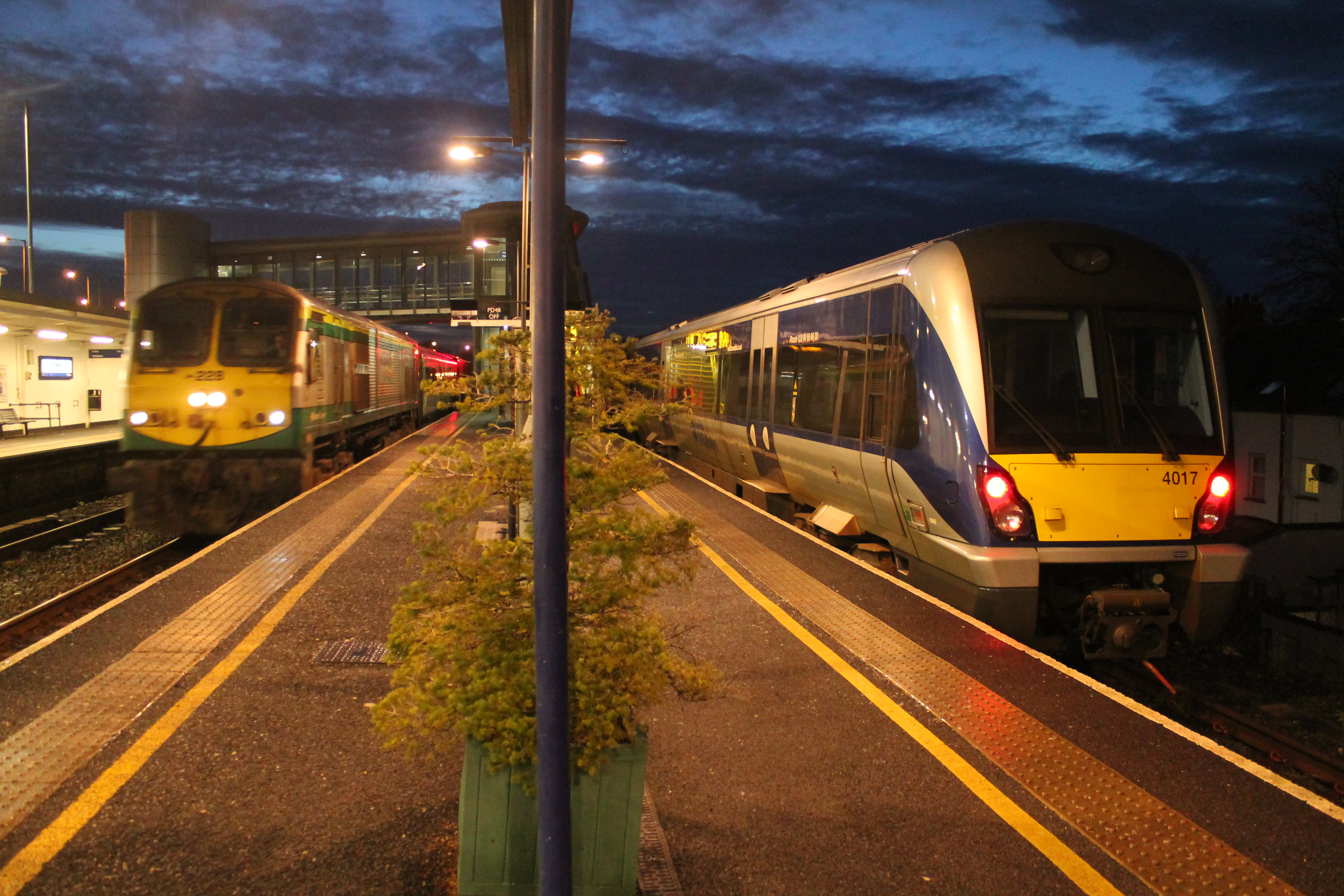
- Portadown station platform 2 (on the left) and 3 (on the right) in December 2014

General information
- Location: Woodhouse Street; Portadown; Northern Ireland
- Coordinates: 54.425°N 6.446°W
- Owner: NI Railways
- Operator: NI Railways
- Line: Dublin–Belfast
- Distance: Belfast Lanyon Place: 26¼ Miles; Dublin Connolly: 87¼ miles
- Platforms: 3
- Tracks: 3
- Train operators: NI Railways, Iarnród Éireann
- Bus routes: 5
- Bus stands: 1
- Bus operators: Translink Ulsterbus & Translink Goldliner

Construction
- Structure type: At-grade
- Architect: 1862: John MacNeill

Other information
- Station code: NIR: PD; IÉ: PDOWN
- Fare zone: iLink Zone 3
- Website: translink.co.uk/Portadown

History
- Former names: Portadown - Craigavon West

Key dates
- 1842: Opened
- 1848: Moved to present location
- 1863: Returned to original location
- 1970: Returned to present location
- 2013: Refurbished
- 2024: Ticket machines installed
- 2025: Automatic ticket barriers installed

Passengers
- 2015/16: 908,113
- 2016/17: ▲950,529
- 2017/18: ▲990,085
- 2018/19: ▲1,055,835
- 2019/20: ▼950,445
- 2020/21: ▼195,336
- 2021/22: ▲587,782
- 2022/23: ▲925,721
- 2023/24: ▲1,141,174
- 2024/25: ▼1,046,238
- 2025/26: ▲1.283 million

Services
Preceding station	NI Railways	Following station
Terminus	Portadown Line	Lurgan towards Belfast Grand Central
Scarva towards Newry	Portadown Line	Lurgan towards Belfast Grand Central
Scarva towards Newry	Portadown Line Portadown - Newry	Terminus
Newry towards Dublin Connolly	Enterprise	Belfast Grand Central Terminus
Newry towards Dublin Connolly	Enterprise (1 per direction on Sundays)	Lurgan towards Belfast Grand Central

Proposed services
Preceding station	Proposed services	Following station
Terminus	All-Island Strategic Rail Review; Mullingar–Portadown Line	Armagh
Terminus	All-Island Strategic Rail Review; Derry–Portadown Line	Dungannon

Historical railways
Preceding station	Historical railways	Following station
Terminus	Ulster Railway; Belfast–Portadown	Lurgan; Line and station open
Terminus	Ulster Railway; Portadown–Clones	Richhill; Line and station closed
Terminus	Portadown, Dungannon and Omagh Junction Railway; Portadown–Omagh	Annaghmore; Line and station closed
Terminus	Dublin and Belfast Junction Railway; Portadown–Drogheda	Tanderagee; Line open, station closed
Tanderagee; Line open, station closed	Great Northern Railway (Ireland); Belfast–Dublin	Lurgan; Line and station open
- NI Railways; Translink; NI railway stations
Route map
(Click to expand)
Location
- Location within Northern Ireland Location within island of Ireland

Portadown Railway Station serves the town of Portadown in County Armagh, Northern Ireland.

The station is located on the Belfast-Dublin railway line. The original station opened in 1842, and the present station opened in 1970. It is currently County Armagh's busiest station and Northern Ireland's 5th busiest station with over 1.2 million passengers in the 2025/26 financial year

== History ==
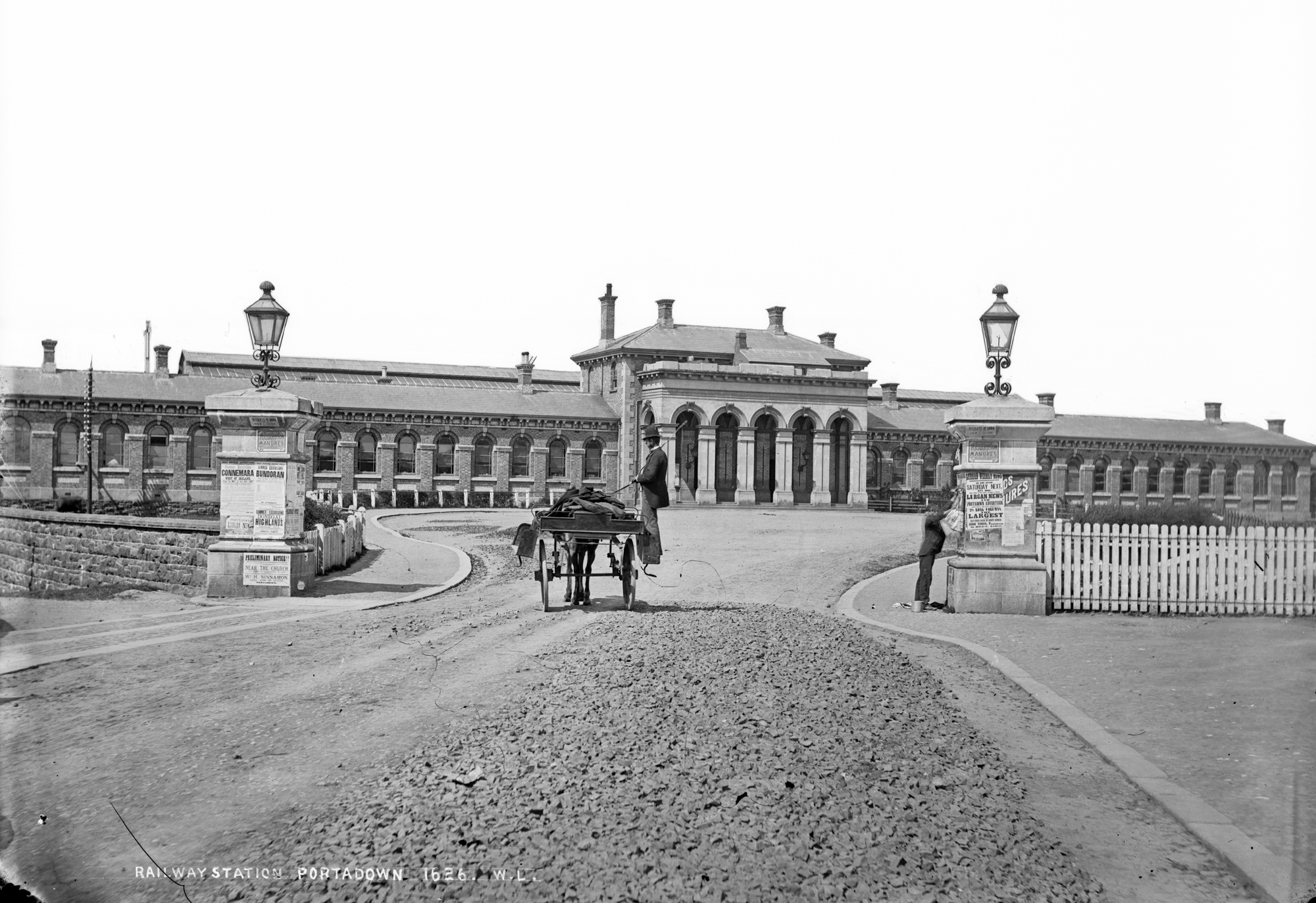
The station, c. 1879.

The original Portadown station was sited half a mile east of the present station and opened on 12 September 1842, replacing a temporary station at Seagoe that had opened the preceding year. The Portadown station was moved to the present location in 1848 then reverted to its original site between 1863 and 1970. Goods traffic ceased on 4 January 1965.

The present station opened in 1970, replacing a large and largely redundant station. At the time (1970) the station was called Portadown - Craigavon West, a title that was quietly dropped after the "new city" Craigavon failed to materialise. The layout of the 1970 station was modified in 1997 to allow bi-directional working on all three platforms. The lines to Cavan via Armagh (closed 1957), and Derry via Dungannon and Omagh (closed 1965) diverged immediately west of the present station.

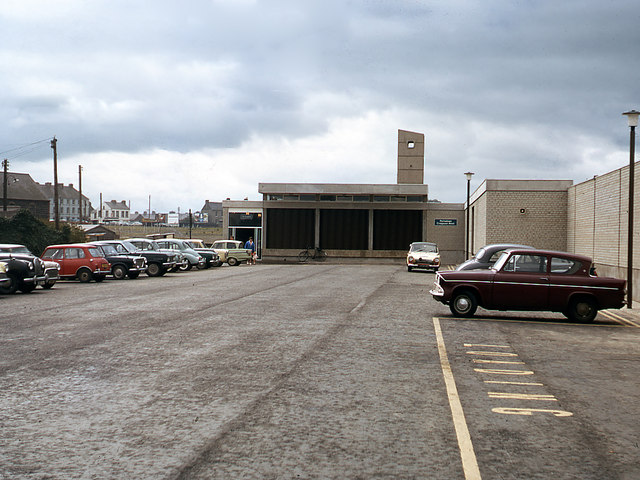
Portadown's new station in 1970

In 2012, work began on a major refurbishment of the station. A new, modern building was constructed and a footbridge replaced the subway. The refurbishment was completed in 2013.In 2018, a new 347-space Park and Ride facility opened at Corcrain Road near the station. Ticket vending machines were installed at the station in 2024, followed by automatic ticket barriers in 2025.

== Layout ==
The station has three platforms, which are all fully accessible via lifts, and a footbridge connects platform 1 with platforms 2 and 3. The modern station building features ticket machines as well as a ticket office, departure boards, a shop and plenty of seating both in the station's main concourse and on the platforms. There are automatic ticket barriers at the entrance to the platforms from the station concourse. Platform 1 is used mostly for Southbound Enterprise services and terminating NI Railways services from Belfast, platform 2 is used mostly for northbound Enterprise services and platform 3 is used for terminating NI Railways services from Newry or Belfast, and sometimes empty trains are stored at platform 3 as well. There are two sidings South of platform 1 sometimes used for storing track machinery e.g. tampers.

== Service ==
This is the terminus for most services on the Belfast-Newry railway line. Four services operate beyond here to Newry on weekdays and Saturdays. There is a half-hourly service to Belfast Grand Central in the other direction. On Sundays, this service reduces to hourly toward Belfast Grand Central, with no NIR services to Newry.

An hourly Enterprise service runs to Dublin Connolly or Belfast Grand Central every weekday and Saturday, while a bi-hourly service operates on Sundays.

The line is very popular with passengers travelling to sporting and music events in Dublin, including events at Croke Park, which is within walking distance of Dublin Connolly, and the Aviva Stadium, which can be reached by changing at Connolly for the DART to Lansdowne Road. The line is also used by passengers changing at Dublin Connolly for DART services to destinations such as Dún Laoghaire, Bray & Greystones. Passengers travelling onward by ferry can transfer in Dublin city centre to Dublin Port for Irish Ferries or Stena Line services to Holyhead, from where rail connections continue along the North Wales Coast Line to London Euston and other destinations in England and Wales.

== Future ==
=== Link to Armagh City ===
There is a possibility of re-opening of the line from Portadown to Armagh railway station. Government Minister for the Department for Regional Development, Danny Kennedy MLA indicates railway restoration plans.

The Armagh railway line has been listed in proposed plans to reopen the line.

In December 2025, the Portadown to Armagh line was included in the Rail Project Prioritisation Strategy as one of the projects to be progressed. In June 2026, Infrastructure Minister Liz Kimmins stated that Department for Infrastructure officials were working closely with Translink to progress the business cases for the line, subject to budget availability.

=== All-Island Rail Review ===
The all-island rail review suggested that Portadown once again become a major interchange between the current Dublin-Belfast Main line, proposed lines such as the single tracked Mullingar-Portadown Line via Armagh, Monaghan, Clones, and Cavan and the dual tracked Derry~Londonderry-Portadown Line via Dungannon, Omagh and Strabane. Portadown would also become an inland freight terminal serving connections to Rosslare Europort, Dublin Port and Larne Harbour.

The All-Island Rail Review draft also includes 29 other recommendations for railways across the Island of Ireland and it is said that it will take at least 25 years to complete. It would cost in the range of €36.8bn/£30.7bn (as of 2023) and be split between both regions. 75% by the Republic of Ireland and 25% by Northern Ireland.

In December 2025, a Rail Project Prioritisation Strategy was published setting out how the recommendations of the review should be sequenced. It identified projects including Portadown to Armagh and Portadown to Derry for progression.

== Bus connections ==
Translink's Ulsterbus and Goldliner services operating from just outside Portadown railway station:

Preceding station	Ulsterbus	Following station
Portadown; Church Street	Ulsterbus; 61 Armagh-Portadown	Seagoe; Craigavon Area Hospital
Terminus	Ulsterbus; 75 Portadown - Dungannon	Portadown; High Street
Portadown; High Street	Ulsterbus; 75a Dungannon - Craigavon Hospital	The Birches; Roundabout
Terminus	Ulsterbus; 65 Portadown - Loughgall - Armagh	Portadown; Church Street
Preceding station	Goldline	Following station
Lurgan; Loughview Park & Ride Lough Road	Goldline; 271 Belfast - Cavan	Richhill; Village
Lurgan; Loughview Park & Ride Lough Road	Goldline; 251 Belfast - Armagh	Richhill; Village
Lurgan; Loughview Park & Ride Lough Road	Goldline; 251a Belfast - Armagh	Richhill; Village

== Gallery ==
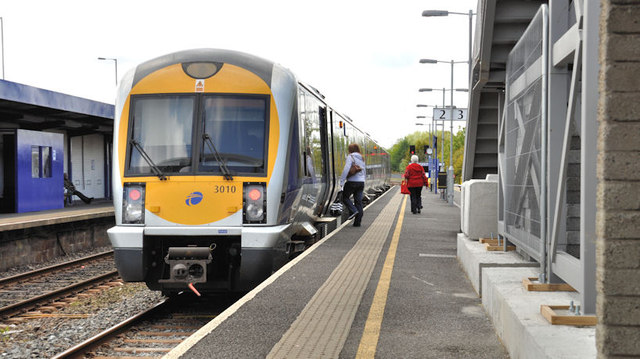
Class 3000 awaiting departure to Bangor 9 May 2012

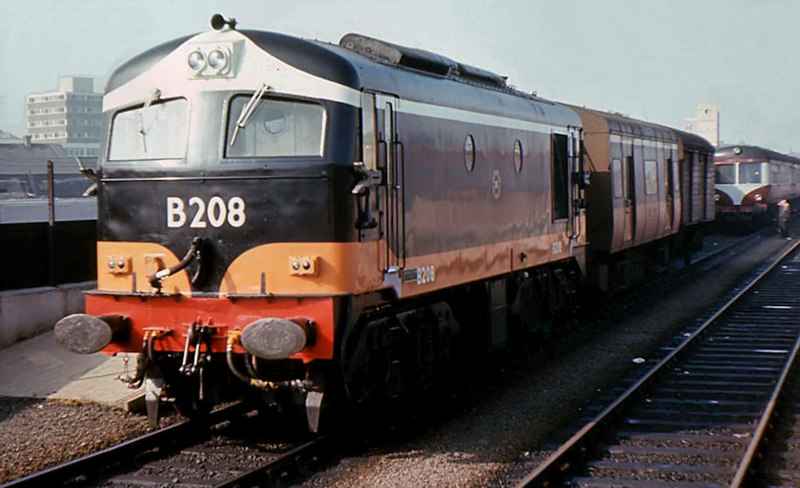
Cross Border Mail Train in Portadown 15 July 1972

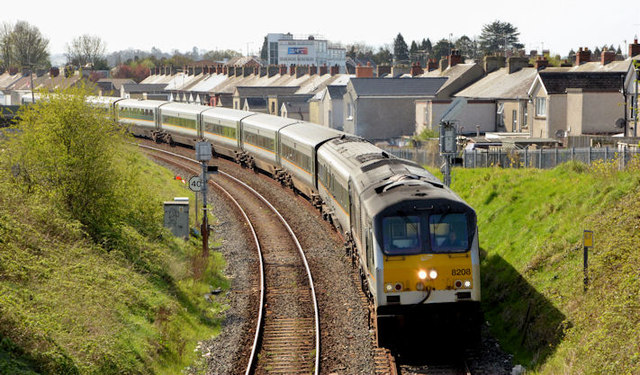
The Enterprise Train approaching Portadown from Dublin on the 15 April 2014

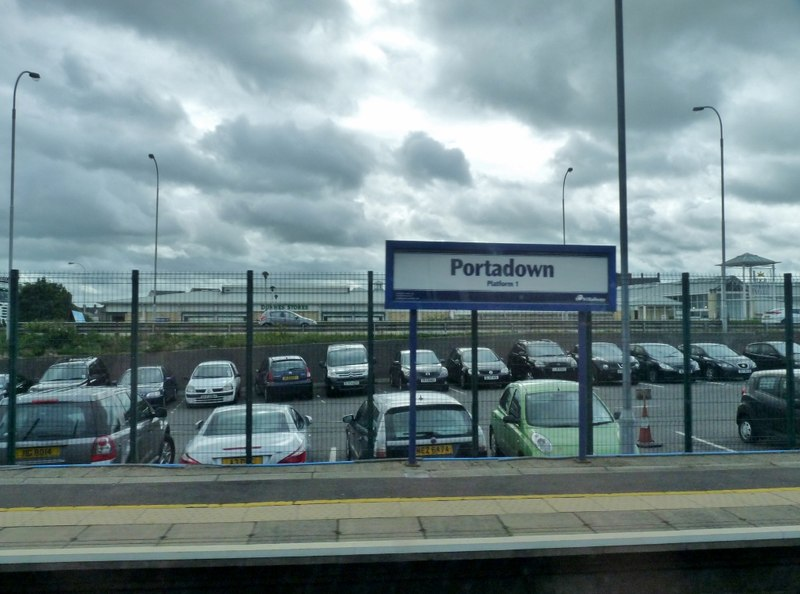
Portadown Platform 1 and Car Park 28 August 2015

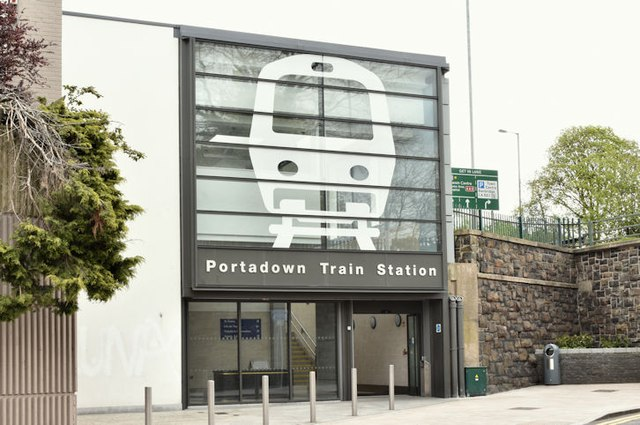
Entrance to Portadown Station May 2016

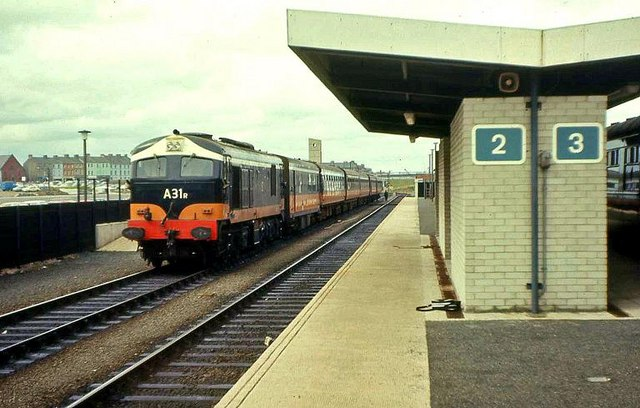
The Enterprise Train arriving into Portadown (Craigavon West) from Dublin on 10 June 1972

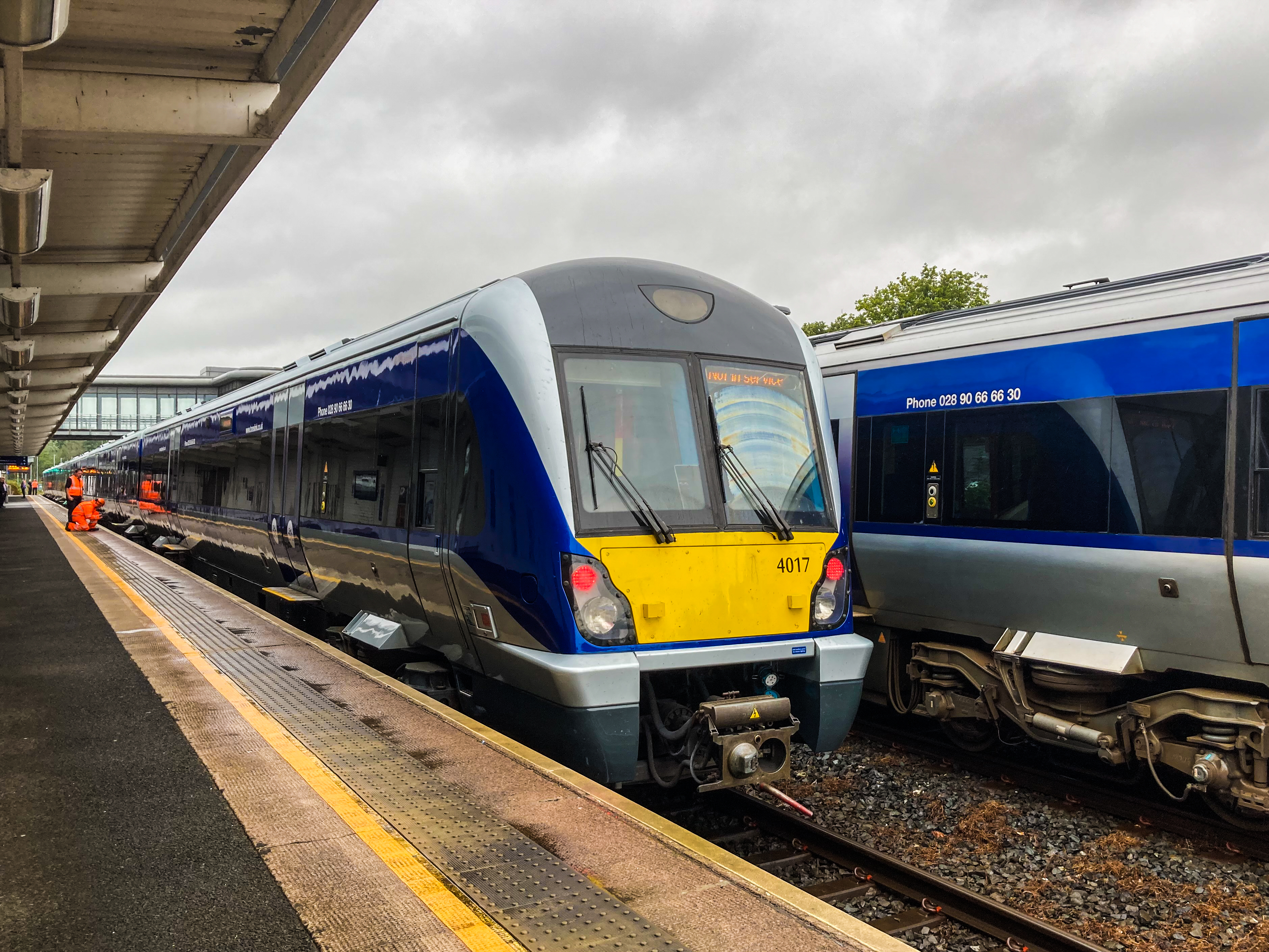
NIR extended 4017 on test after receiving 3 additional intermediate carriages.
