= Belfast–Dublin line =

Main intercity railway between Dublin & Belfast

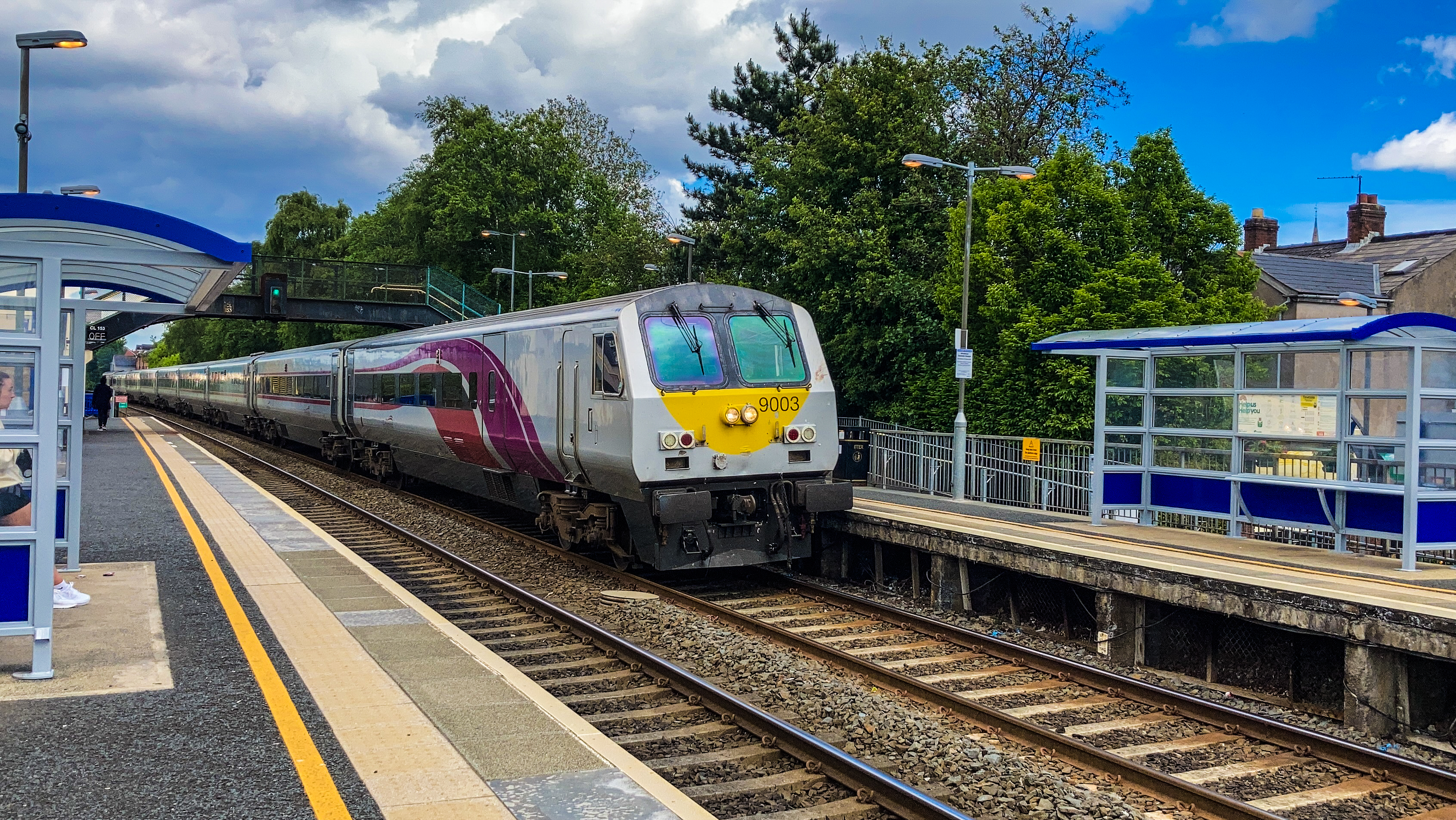
- Enterprise De Dietrich DVT 9003 at Adelaide (Northern Ireland)

Overview
- Other name(s): The Great Northern Main Line; Dublin Line; Belfast Line
- Native name: Líne iarnróid Bhaile Átha Cliath - Béal Feirste
- Status: Operational
- Locale: Ireland
- Termini: Belfast Grand Central; Dublin Connolly
- Connecting lines: Belfast-Bangor line Belfast-Larne line Belfast-Derry~Londonderry line Dublin-Rosslare line Dublin Sligo line Dublin-Cork line Luas
- Former connections: Lisburn–Antrim line
- Stations: 34

Service
- Type: Commuter rail Regional rail Heavy rail Freight rail
- System: Iarnród Éireann; NI Railways
- Services: Dublin Connolly – Belfast Grand Central; Dublin Connolly – Drogheda MacBride/Dundalk Clarke; Belfast Grand Central – Lisburn; Belfast Grand Central – Portadown; Belfast Grand Central – Newry; Portadown – Newry (morning only); DART Malahide/Howth – Bray (– Greystones)
- Operator(s): Iarnród Éireann; NI Railways
- Depot(s): Adelaide Depot (Translink); Drogheda (Iarnród Éireann); Fairview DART depot (Iarnród Éireann)
- Rolling stock: 071 Class; 201 Class; 8100 Class; 8500 Class; 8510 Class; 8520 Class; 3000 Class "C3K"; 4000 Class "C4K"; 22000 Class "ICR"; 29000 Class "CxK"; De Dietrich Stock

History
- Opened: 1876

Technical
- Line length: 181 kilometres (112 mi)
- Num of tracks: Double track
- Track gauge: 1,600 mm (5 ft 3 in) Irish gauge
- Electrification: 1,500 V DC overhead line (south of Malahide)
- Operating speed: 90 mph (140 km/h)
Route map
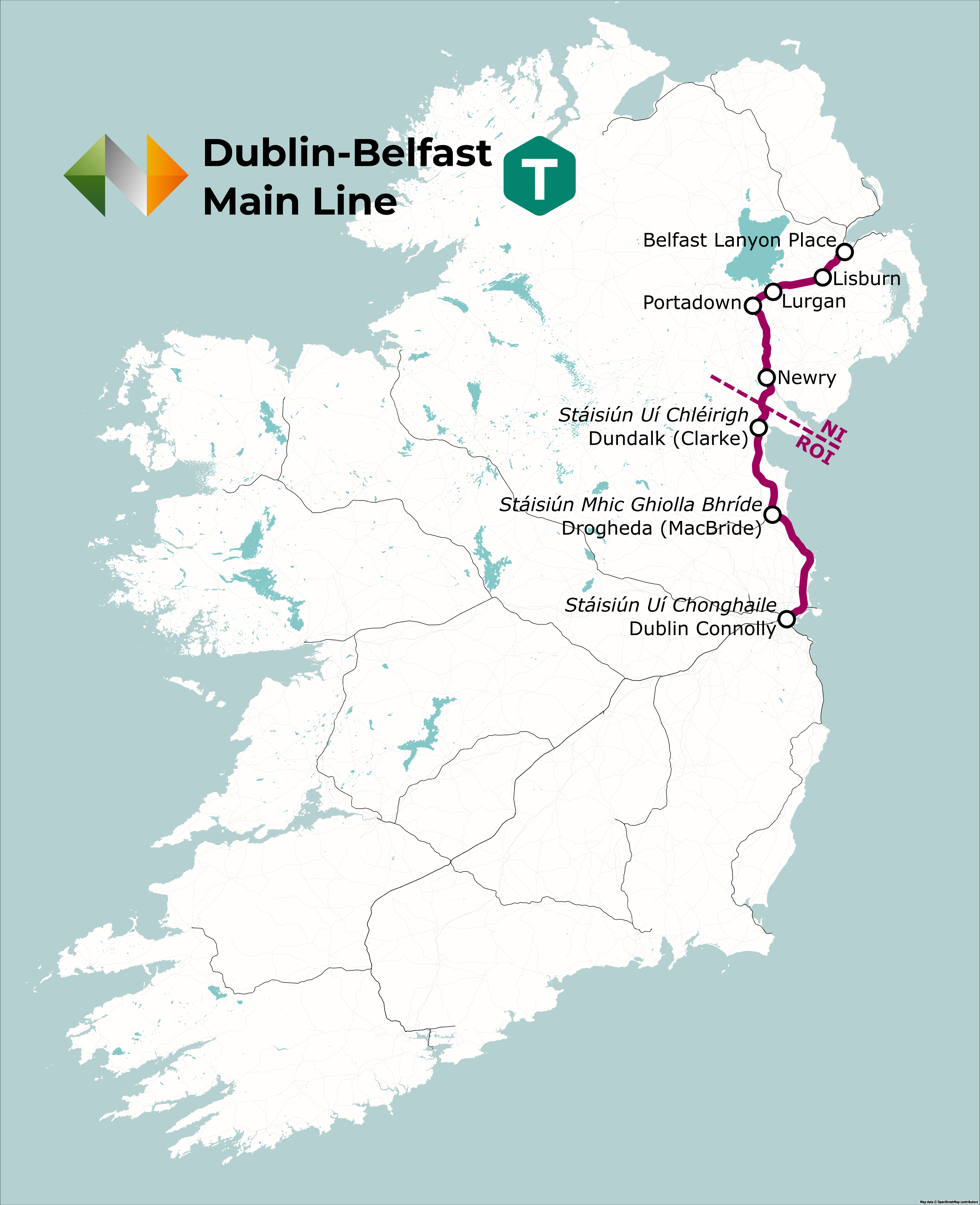
(Click to expand)

The Belfast–Dublin line, commonly known as the Dublin-Belfast Line or The Great Northern Main Line (or simply the "Dublin line" by NI Railways and the "Belfast line" by Iarnród Éireann), is a 112-mile (181 km) semi-electrified railway connecting Belfast Grand Central in Northern Ireland to Dublin Connolly in the Republic of Ireland. The key towns and cities of Skerries, Drogheda, Dundalk, Newry, Portadown, Lurgan, and Lisburn are situated along the line. The Belfast–Dublin line is the busiest railway route on the island of Ireland, carrying a mixture of intercity rail, regional rail, commuter rail traffic and freight traffic. It is uniquely significant as the only railway line that crosses the Republic of Ireland–United Kingdom border.

== History ==
=== Early Development ===
The construction of the Belfast–Dublin line was undertaken by three separate railway companies:

- Ulster Railway: Incorporated in by the Ulster Railway Act 1836, the Ulster Railway began construction in March 1837. By August 1839, It had completed the initial 7-mile stretch between Belfast Station (changing to Belfast Victoria Street, later renamed Belfast Great Victoria Street) and Lisburn. The line progressively extended to Lurgan 1841 and then Portadown by 1842 and further to Clones by 1863. Initially built to a broad gauge, the Ulster Railway later converted to the Irish standard gauge of 5 feet 3 inches to ensure compatibility with other lines.
- Dublin and Drogheda Railway (D&D): Authorised by Dublin and Drogheda Railway Act 1836 & 1840 established the route between Dublin and Drogheda. Initially the line opened on 24 May 1844 from Drogheda to Dublin Royal Canal later changing to Dublin Station (Later Amiens street then Connolly) on the 29 November 1844.
- Dublin and Belfast Junction Railway (D&B Jct): Incorporated in 1845, the Dublin and Belfast Junction Railway aimed to bridge the gap between the D&D at Drogheda and the Ulster Railway at Portadown. The line opened in stages between 1849 and 1853, with the completion of the Boyne Viaduct in 1855 marking the final connection. This connection completed the direct line between Dublin and Belfast.

=== Amalgamation and Formation of the Great Northern Railway (Ireland) ===
In 1875, the Dublin and Drogheda Railway and the Dublin and Belfast Junction Railway merged to form the Northern Railway of Ireland. A year later, this entity combined with the Ulster Railway and the Irish North Western Railway, resulting in the creation of the Great Northern Railway (Ireland) (GNRI) in 1876. This consolidation streamlined operations and management across the network.

The partition of Ireland in 1922 meant that the Irish border passed between Goraghwood and Dundalk, causing delays as trains were required to stop at stations on either side of the border for customs examinations. This disruption was eased in 1947 with the opening of facilities for customs checks at Amiens Street station in Dublin and Great Victoria Street station in Belfast though this only helped its recently introduced enterprise Express.

At the same time, the GNRI made its Belfast–Dublin services non-stop with the launch of the Enterprise Express. The GNRI was nationalised by the governments of the Republic of Ireland and Northern Ireland in 1953 as the Great Northern Railway Board, but in 1958 this was split between the Ulster Transport Authority and Córas Iompair Éireann. This led to a running down of rail services in Northern Ireland, leaving only some Belfast commuter lines, the northern route to Derry and the link to Dublin. In 1970 the newly formed NI Railways bought new locomotives and rolling stock for the Belfast–Dublin Enterprise service as well as new diesel multiple units for local services.

== Services ==
=== Enterprise (Belfast Line/Dublin Line) ===
The Enterprise service is a premier cross-border rail link jointly operated by Iarnród Éireann and NI Railways, connecting Dublin Connolly station in the Republic of Ireland with Belfast Grand Central station in Northern Ireland. As of October 29, 2024, the service operates hourly in each direction from early morning, totalling 15 trains daily from Monday to Saturday, and eight services on Sundays.

The journey covers the full line and takes about two hours, with key stops including Drogheda MacBride, Dundalk Clarke, Newry, and Portadown (Lurgan and Lisburn on Sundays). Onboard amenities feature free Wi-Fi, a dining car, and both standard and Enterprise Plus accommodations, the latter offering more spacious seating and complimentary refreshments.

=== Newry Line ===
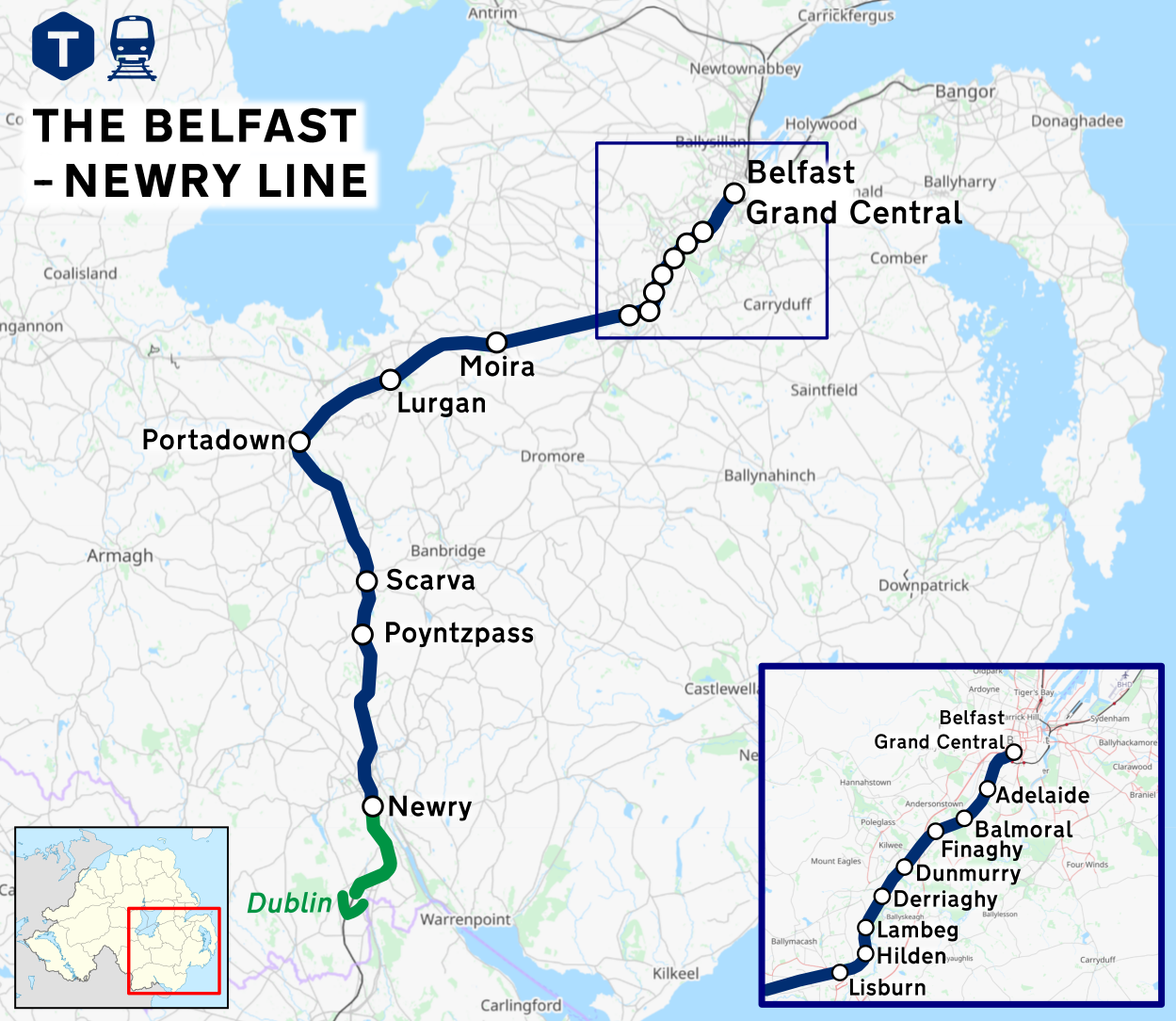
Route of the Belfast–Newry services

The Belfast–Newry line (known as the Portadown line by NI Railways) operates from Belfast Grand Central in County Antrim to Newry in County Down, Northern Ireland. The manager for this line is based at Portadown railway station, although the line extends to the border to include the Scarva and Poyntzpass halts and Newry. Newry is on the fringe of the network, being the last stop before the border with the Republic of Ireland. The line follows the route of the northern half of the main Belfast–Dublin line.

NI Railways operates a local service between Belfast Grand Central operating to and from Portadown. Local services are operated with C3K/C4K trains, constructed by CAF, Spain. A less intensive local service operates from Newry, with only four local services a day operating from there.

=== Northern Line ===
The Northern Commuter line, operated by Iarnród Éireann, connects Dublin Connolly in County Dublin to Dundalk Clarke in County Louth. Key stations along the route include Malahide, Donabate, and Drogheda MacBride, with the line's management based at Dublin Connolly railway station. Dundalk Clarke is the final stop before reaching the border with Northern Ireland. The line follows the southern half of the Belfast–Dublin line.

While most commuter services run between Dublin and Drogheda MacBride, only three morning and one afternoon service originate from Dundalk Clarke. In the reverse direction, one late-morning service travels to Dundalk Clarke, along with five evening to late-night services operating on weekdays. These are operated by 29000 class or the 22000 class.

=== Howth Branch ===
The Howth Branch line, operated by Iarnród Éireann, extends from Howth Junction & Donaghmede station to Howth station in Fingal, Ireland. This branch serves the coastal village of Howth and is served by Dublin Area Rapid Transit (DART) trains.

- Howth Junction & Donaghmede: This station serves the areas of Donaghmede and parts of Kilbarrack in Dublin. It is the junction where the line to Howth diverges from the main Belfast–Dublin line.
- Bayside: Serving the residential area of Bayside.
- Sutton: Serving the suburb of Sutton.
- Howth: The terminus of the branch line, serving the village of Howth and its surrounding areas.

DART services on the Howth Branch operate with high frequency, typically every 10 minutes during peak times on weekdays, providing access between Howth and Dublin city centre.

=== Navan Branch ===
The Navan Branch, managed by Iarnród Éireann, is a railway line in County Meath, Ireland, primarily used for freight services. This line facilitates the transportation of materials from the Tara Mines, one of Europe's largest zinc and lead mines, located near Navan. Freight trains operate regularly between the mines and Dublin Port.

== Infrastructure ==
=== Track layout ===
From Dublin Connolly station to Drogheda, the line is double-track with a singler passing loop at Clongriffin. This section is the busiest, handling intercity trains to Belfast, commuter services (DART and Northern Commuter), and freight traffic to Navan. The double-track configuration, combined with frequent stops for commuter trains, can lead to delays for faster intercity services. North of Drogheda, the line remains double-track with no freight traffic continuing beyond the Navan branch. Drogheda station features a third bay platform used primarily for terminating commuter services from Dublin.

At Milepost 59 ½, just north of Dundalk, the ownership and control of the line shift to NI Railways (part of the Translink network), which takes over the operation of the line as it continues north towards Belfast. This boundary marks a significant transition in control with signalling changing from Connolly Signal central to Portadown which controls the line from the Border to Lisburn. The line between Dundalk and Newry is also a double-track configuration, with Dundalk station featuring a third bay platform for terminating services from Dublin, and Newry station having two platforms with no additional tracks.

From Newry to Belfast, the line continues as double-track, with stations like Portadown playing a significant role in the network. Portadown station includes three tracks, facilitating overtaking or terminating services, while Lisburn station primarily serves suburban commuter trains heading into Belfast. As the line leaves Lisburn, signalling changes for a final time to Belfast Lanyon Place Signal Centre, which controls signalling north of Lisburn on the approach to Belfast. Approaching City junction, the infrastructure expands to accommodate the higher density of commuter and intercity services converging on Belfast Grand Central.

=== Electrification ===
The line is only partially electrified:

- Dublin to Malahide: Electrified with 1,500 V DC overhead lines, supporting DART commuter services.
- North of Malahide: Operated entirely with diesel traction. Full electrification of the line has been proposed to support faster, more sustainable intercity and commuter services, but it remains unrealised.

== Rolling stock ==
=== Rolling stock in operation ===
The Belfast–Dublin train route is serviced by a variety of trains,

The C3K and C4K trains operate from Portadown, Lisburn, and Newry to Belfast Grand Central. Built by CAF, the C3K trains are known for their reliability and comfort, featuring modern amenities for a pleasant journey. However, only certain C3Ks have the necessary signalling equipment to operate cross-border. The newer C4K trains offer increased capacity, ensuring efficient travel within Northern Ireland, but cannot operate across the border. These trains come in sets of 3 or 6 cars.

Additionally, the 29000 Class railcars are used for commuter services from Dundalk and Drogheda to Dublin, providing a journey with seating and power outlets. Only certain 29000 and 22000 Class railcars are equipped with the required signalling systems to operate on both sides of the border, with the 22000 Class railcars designed primarily for intercity journeys but occasionally serving on commuter services as well.

The DART (Dublin Area Rapid Transit) network utilizes electric multiple units (EMUs), including the 8100 Class, as well as the 8500, 8510, and 8520 Classes.

The Enterprise service, primarily using Mark 3 carriages built by CAF, is equipped with air-conditioning, onboard Wi-Fi, and ergonomic seating. The Enterprise trains are locomotive-hauled. The C3K and 22000 Class trains also supplement the Enterprise service at certain times, enhancing the overall capacity and flexibility of the Belfast–Dublin corridor.

Family	Class	Image	Type	Top speed		Operator	Routes	Introduced
Family	Class	Image	Type	mph	km/h	Operator	Routes	Introduced
DART	8100 Class		EMU	60	100	Iarnród Éireann	Howth-Bray Daly; Howth-Greystones; Malahide-Bray Daly; Malahide-Greystones	1983–1984
DART	8500 Class		EMU	70	110	Iarnród Éireann	Howth-Bray Daly; Howth-Greystones; Malahide-Bray Daly; Malahide-Greystones	2000
DART	8510 Class		EMU	70	110	Iarnród Éireann	Howth-Bray Daly; Howth-Greystones; Malahide-Bray Daly; Malahide-Greystones	2001
DART	8520 Class		EMU	70	110	Iarnród Éireann	Howth-Bray Daly; Howth-Greystones; Malahide-Bray Daly; Malahide-Greystones	2003–2004
CxK	3000 Class		DMU	90	145	NI Railways	Belfast–Dublin (Enterprise) ^{a}; Belfast-Lisburn; Belfast-Portadown; Belfast-Newry; Portadown-Newry	2003–2005
CxK	4000 Class		DMU	90	145	NI Railways	Belfast-Lisburn; Belfast-Portadown; Belfast-Newry; Portadown-Newry	2010–2021
ICR	22000 Class		DMU	100	160	Iarnród Éireann	Dublin–Dundalk; Belfast–Dublin (Enterprise) ^{b}	2007–2012
CxK	29000 Class	29000 Class DMU	DMU	75	120	Iarnród Éireann	Dublin–Drogheda; Dublin–Dundalk	2002–2005
	201 Class	Belfast Central (2)	Diesel locomotive	102	164	Iarnród Éireann & NI Railways	Belfast–Dublin (Enterprise)	1994–1995
	De Dietrich stock	Belfast Central (1)	Passenger coaches	90	145	Iarnród Éireann & NI Railways	Belfast–Dublin (Enterprise)	1996
	Mark 3	Belfast Central (3)	Generator van	100	160	Iarnród Éireann & NI Railways	Belfast–Dublin (Enterprise)	1980
	111 Class		Diesel locomotive	90	145	NI Railways	Infrastructure duties	1980–1984
	MPV		Diesel multiple unit	62	100	NI Railways	Sandite duties	2016
^{a} Only 6 3000 Class units are equipped with CAWS, which allows them to operate in the Republic of Ireland.^{b} Only 9 22000 Class are equipped with TPWS and AWS, which allows them to operate in Northern Ireland.

== Accidents ==
- Adavoyle Incident (1921): On June 24, 1921, during the Irish War of Independence, the Irish Republican Army (IRA) derailed a troop train near Adavoyle, resulting in the deaths of four soldiers and over eighty horses. A train guard and a farmer were also killed in the ensuing crossfire.
- Rush and Lusk Derailment (1947): In January 1947, the Belfast to Dublin express train was derailed at Rush and Lusk Train Station, destroying five carriages and causing significant disruption along the line.
- Malahide Viaduct Collapse (2009): On August 21, 2009, a 20-meter section of the Broadmeadow viaduct near Malahide collapsed into the sea shortly after a passenger train had crossed. Fortunately, there were no injuries. The collapse was attributed to erosion of the viaduct's foundations.

== Developments ==
=== Previous Developments ===
==== New Enterprise Trains (1997) ====
In 1997, a set of new De Dietrich Stock coaches were purchased jointly by Northern Ireland Railways and Iarnród Éireann to operate a revamped Enterprise service along with the new Class 201 locomotives.

==== National Development Plan (2000) ====
In 2000, the government of the Republic of Ireland developed a National Development Plan, which has seen major investment in infrastructure. Almost the entire railway network, including the Belfast–Dublin line as far as the border, has been upgraded to continuous welded rail, while signalling is controlled using the Centralised Traffic Control system located at Dublin Connolly station.

==== Translink Developments (2006) ====
In March 2006, Translink announced that planning permission was sought from Newry and Mourne District Council to construct a new railway station to the east of the existing station at Newry. All the stations on this line except for Bangor, Lanyon Place and Great Victoria Street, were refurbished by 2009.

==== Hourly Enterprise Service (2024) ====
On 29 October 2024, the new hourly Enterprise train service launched, connecting Belfast Grand Central Station and Dublin's Connolly Station. This development was made possible by €25 million in funding from the Irish government's Shared Island Fund and the Department of Transport. The opening of Belfast Grand Central Station also contributed to this significant expansion. Now, the service operates fifteen times in each direction from Monday to Saturday and eight times each way on Sundays.

=== Current developments ===
==== DART+ Coastal North (2021) ====
The DART North project includes several key upgrades to enhance rail connectivity and service quality. To start, the electrified rail network will extend from Malahide to Drogheda, covering approximately 37 kilometres. This involves installing overhead electrification equipment (OHLE) similar to the current DART network. Additionally, new train stabling facilities and other necessary rail infrastructure improvements at key locations such as Drogheda MacBride, Malahide, Clongriffin, and Howth Junction & Donaghmede Stations will increase the number of trains running and improve service frequency. Accessibility at Howth Junction & Donaghmede Station will receive significant enhancements to improve the overall customer experience. Upgraded signalling systems and telecommunications along the route will ensure safe and efficient train operations. By transitioning from diesel to electric trains, the project aims to reduce the carbon footprint and support sustainable development in line with government policies.

==== New Enterprise Trains (2027) ====
In 2027, the Enterprise train service between Belfast and Dublin will introduce new trains, replacing the existing fleet. Funded by €165 million from the PEACEPLUS Programme, the new trains will reduce journey times to under two hours, improve accessibility, and enhance passenger experience. The eight new trains will be designed for sustainability, supporting net zero carbon emissions goals.

==== FourNorth (No Date) ====
It was announced in October 2024 Irish Rail planned to upgrade the line between Connolly and Malahide to have four tracks as recommended by the All-Island Strategic Rail Review. A public consultation is to take place in late 2026 while passing loops are installed along the line in the meantime with EU funding.

=== Proposed developments ===
==== High-speed rail proposal (2020) ====
In 2020 the Irish Government confirmed it will be launching a study into an approximately 500 km (310 mi) high-speed railway from Belfast via Dublin to Cork and Limerick, which could cost around €15 billion.

==== All Ireland Rail review (2024) ====
The All-Island Strategic Rail Review proposes several significant developments to enhance rail connectivity across Ireland. Portadown is set to become a major interchange, with plans to restore the railway line from Derry ~ Londonderry to Portadown, thereby improving connectivity in the northwest region. A new intercity station is proposed for Craigavon, aiming to serve as a key hub in the region and support regional development. A new high-speed spur line from Newry is proposed via Banbridge to Belfast Grand Central. In the Dublin area, the review suggests constructing a spur from Clongriffin to Dublin Airport, providing direct rail access to Ireland's busiest airport. Additionally, there are plans to quadruple track from Clongriffin to Connolly and build a spur between Clongriffin and Drogheda along the M1 to increase capacity and service frequency. These initiatives are part of a broader €37/£32 billion plan to transform the islands rail network by 2050, focusing on electrification, speed enhancements, and expanded services to promote sustainable travel and regional development.

== Popular culture ==
The Belfast–Dublin railway line has been featured in various cultural works, reflecting its significance in connecting two major cities on the island of Ireland. In literature, the line is depicted in novels such as "The Journey Home" by Dermot Bolger, where it symbolizes the protagonist's return to Dublin. The route has also been released as a commercial add on for Microsoft Train Simulator by Making Tracks. It was released in two sections, part one covering Belfast Central (Now Lanyon Place) to Dundalk Clarke, with part two covering the section from Dundalk Clarke to Dublin Tara street. It is set during the 2000s.

== Gallery ==
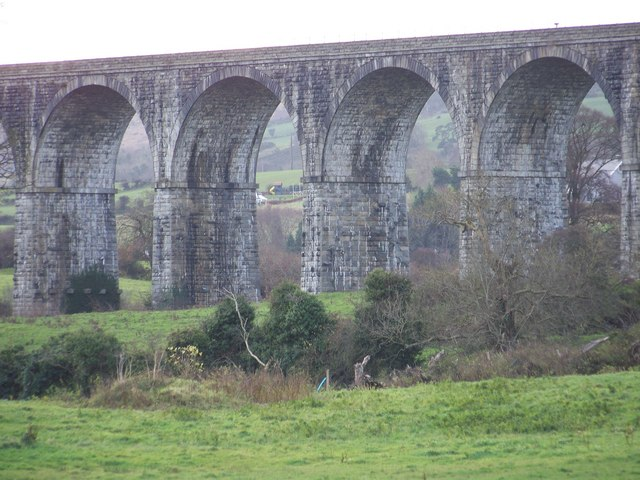
Craigmore Viaduct in Bessbrook near Newry.

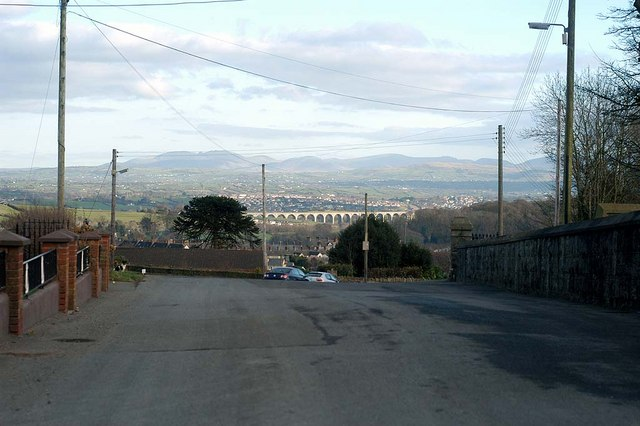
Craigmore Viaduct with the Mournes in the background, seen from Bessbrook near Newry station.

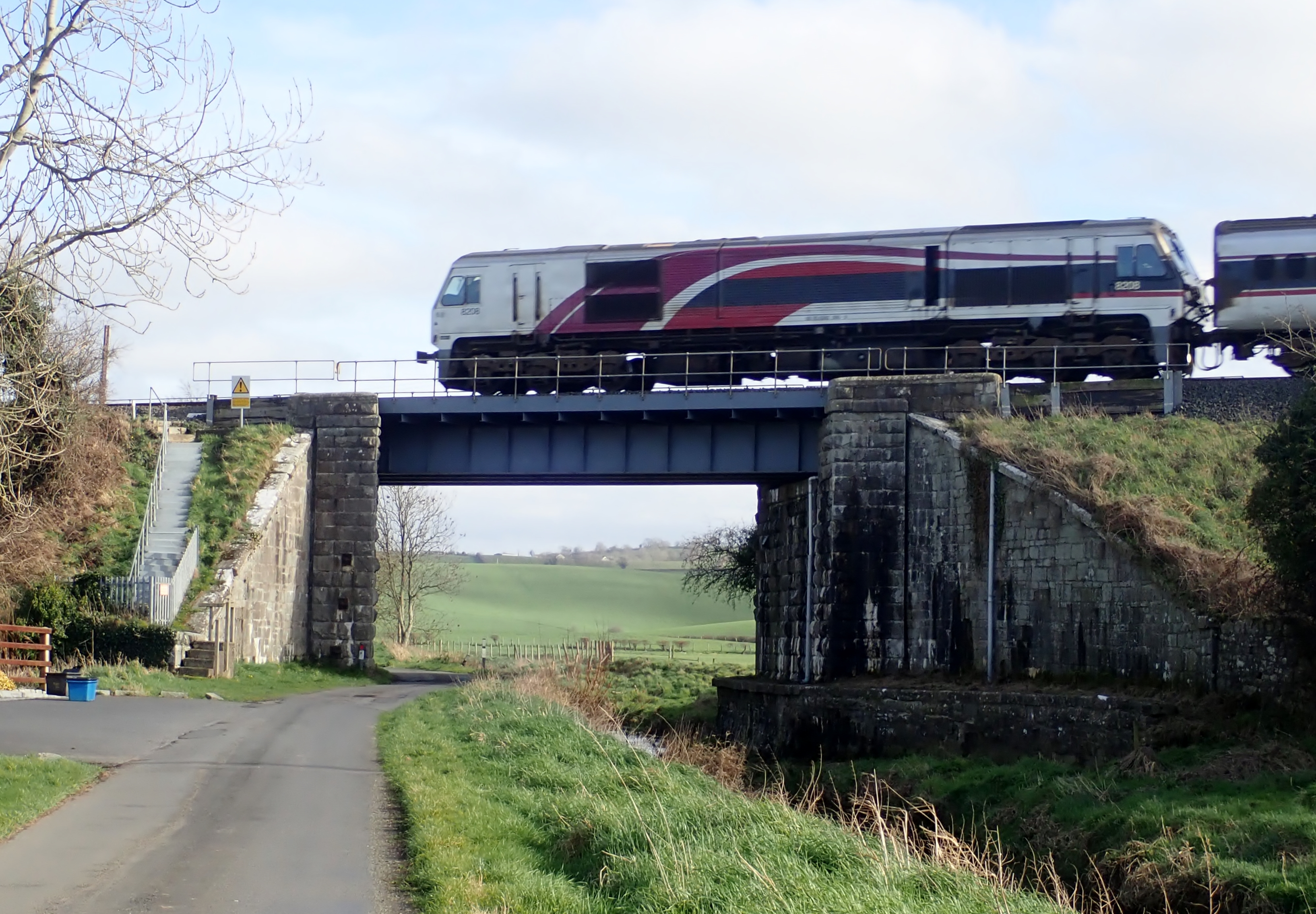
NIR 201 Class Loco 8208 heading the ex Dublin Connolly Enterprise south of Poyntzpass 2019

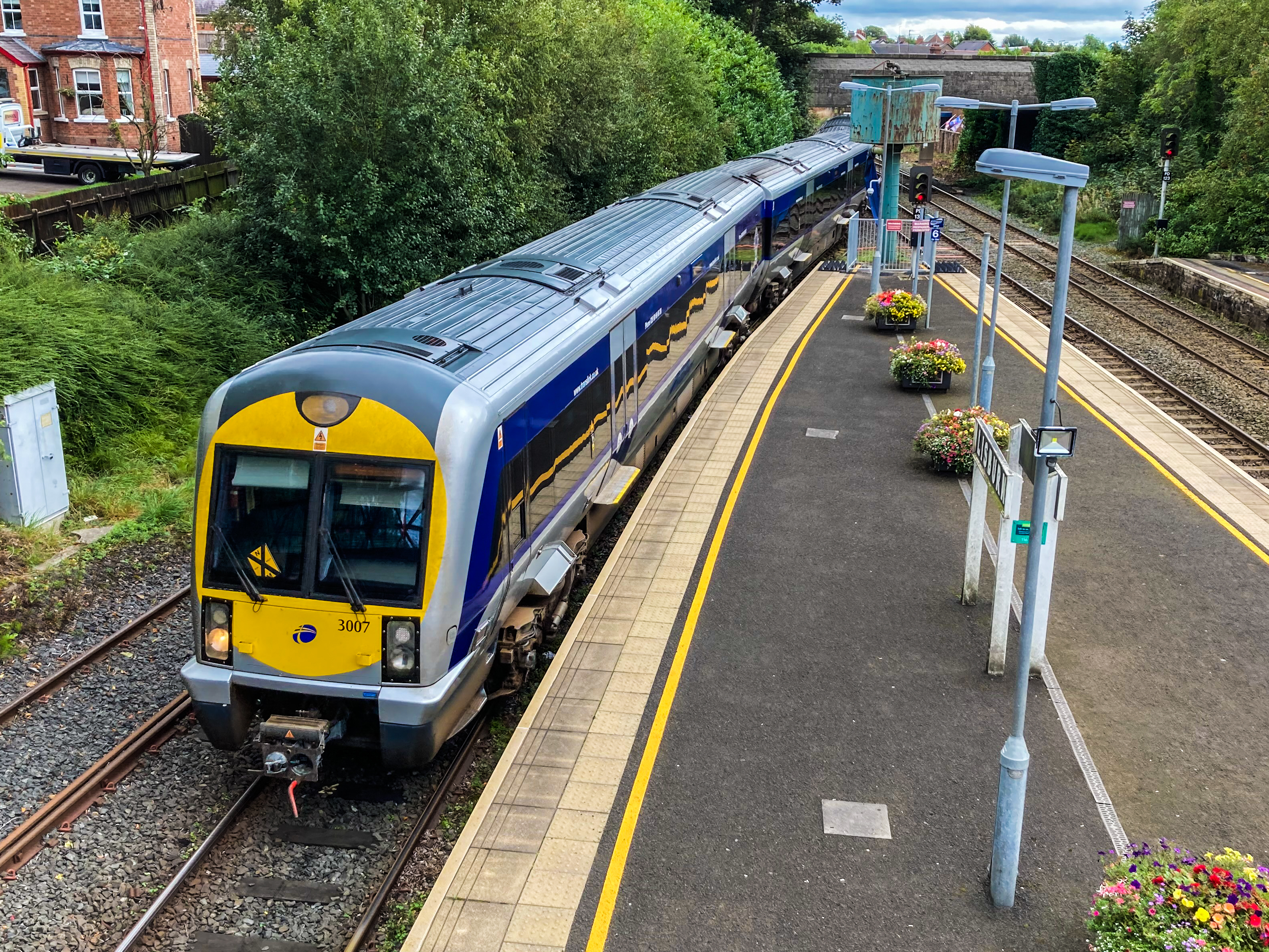
Class 3000 terminating at Lisburn station after working the Belfast Commuter service 2021

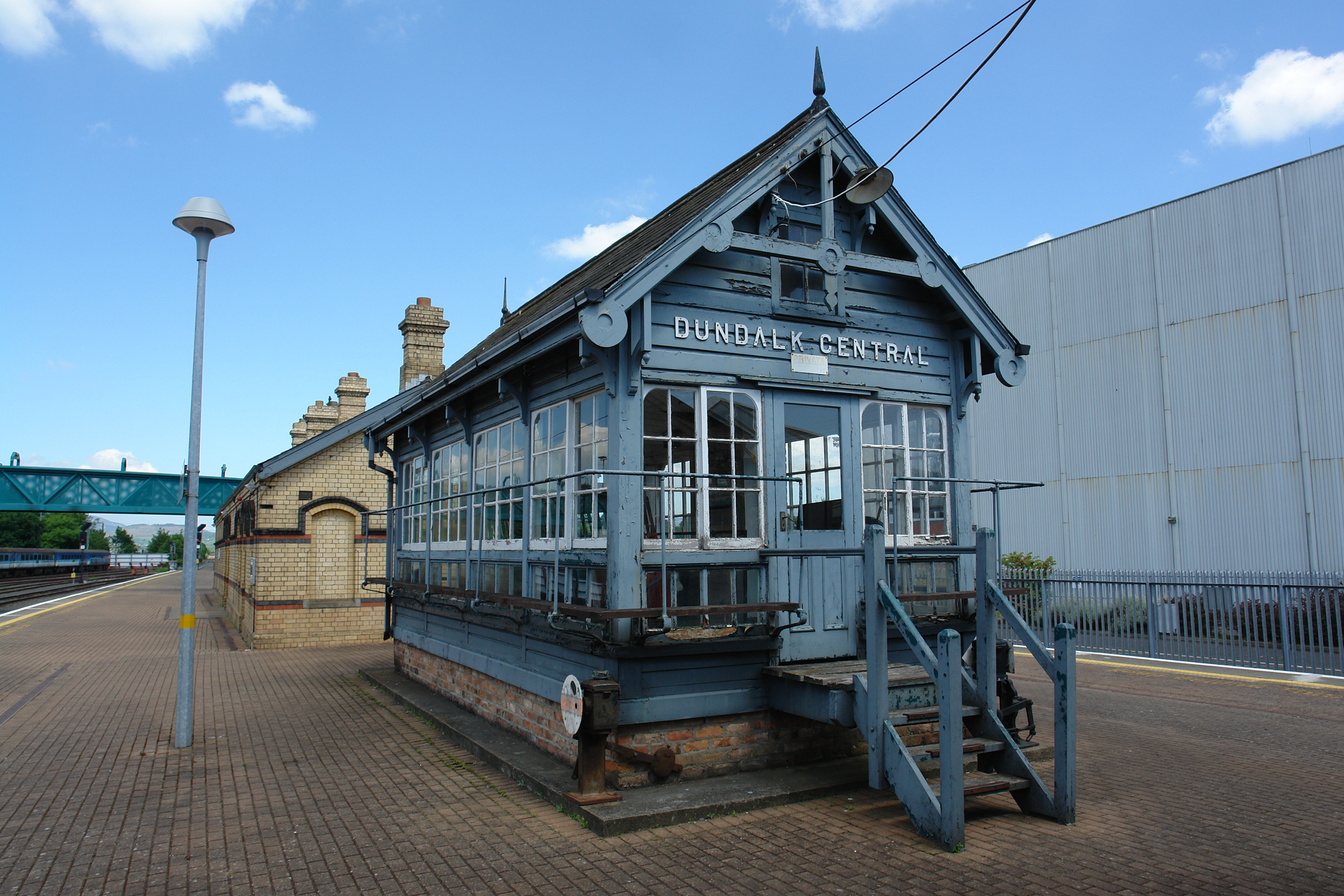
Dundalk Central signal cabin

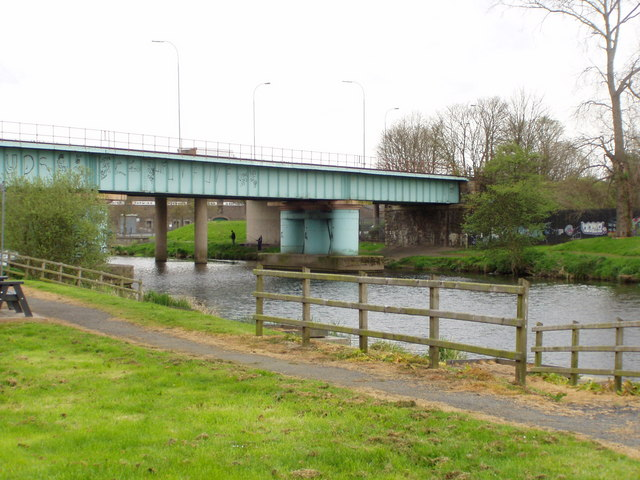
Viaduct over the River Bann near Portadown.

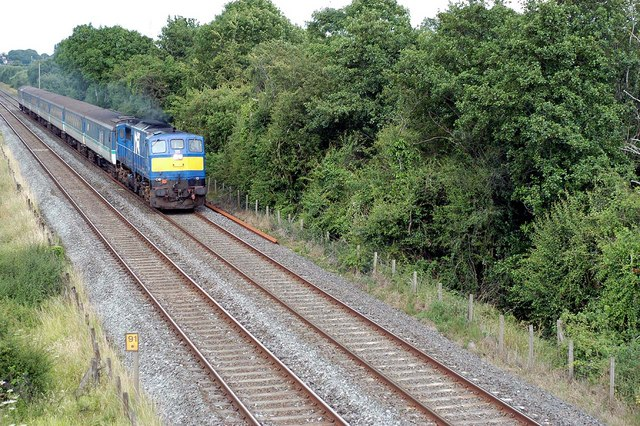
The exGatwick Express rolling stock on the line at Goodyear near Seagoe.

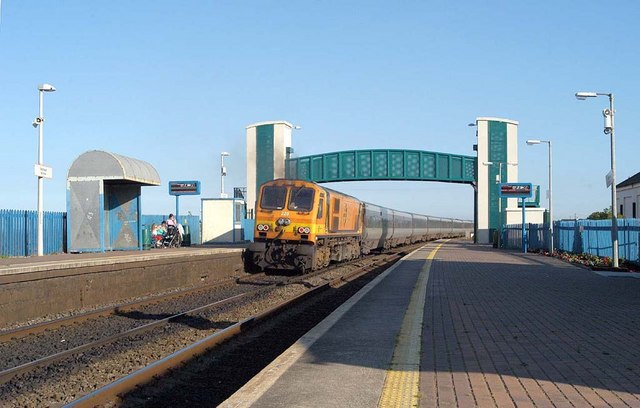
220 passing Laytown Station 2005

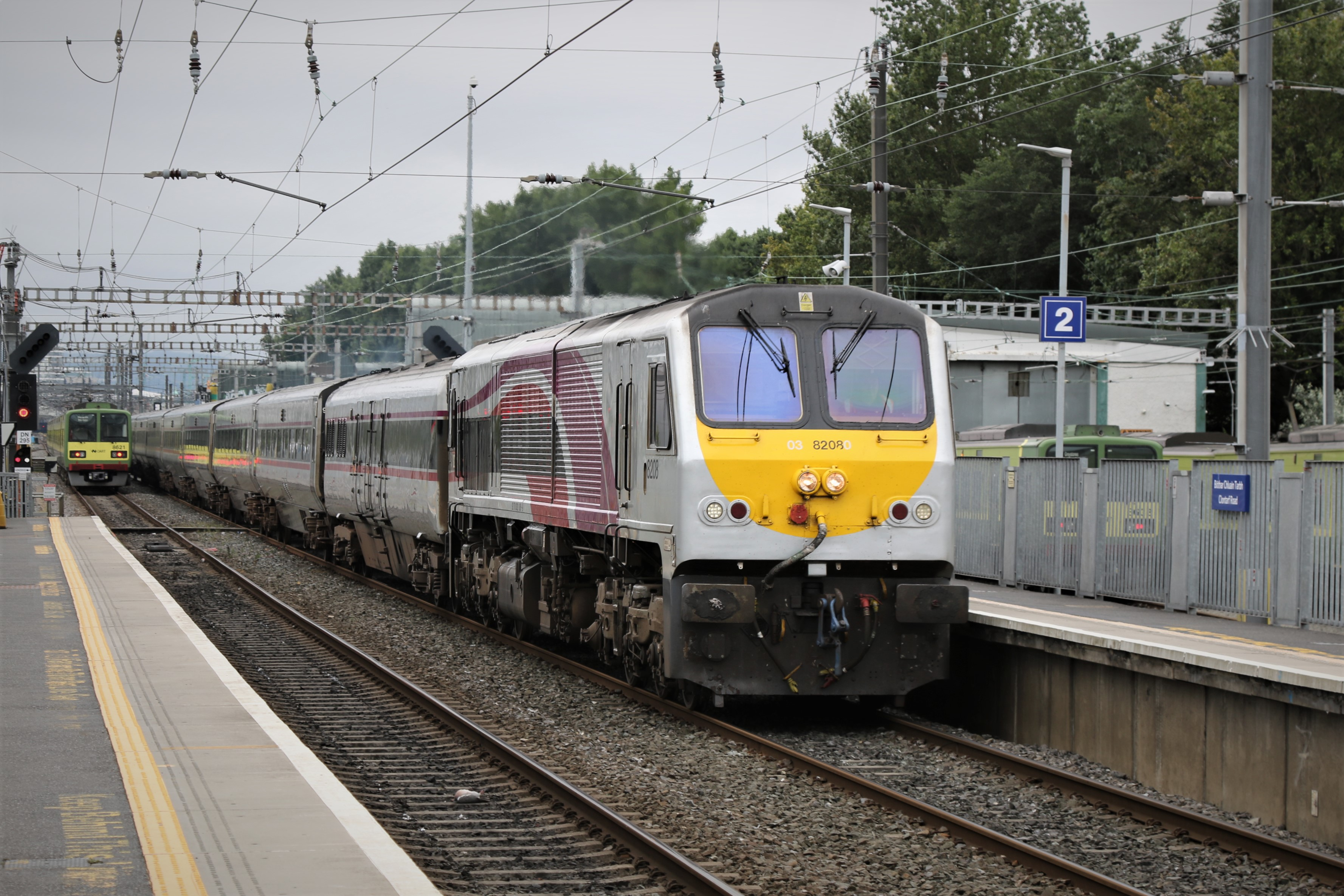
The 11.20 hrs service from Dublin Connolly to Belfast gathers speed at Clontarf Road Station, powered today by Translink / NIR engine 8208. 2019

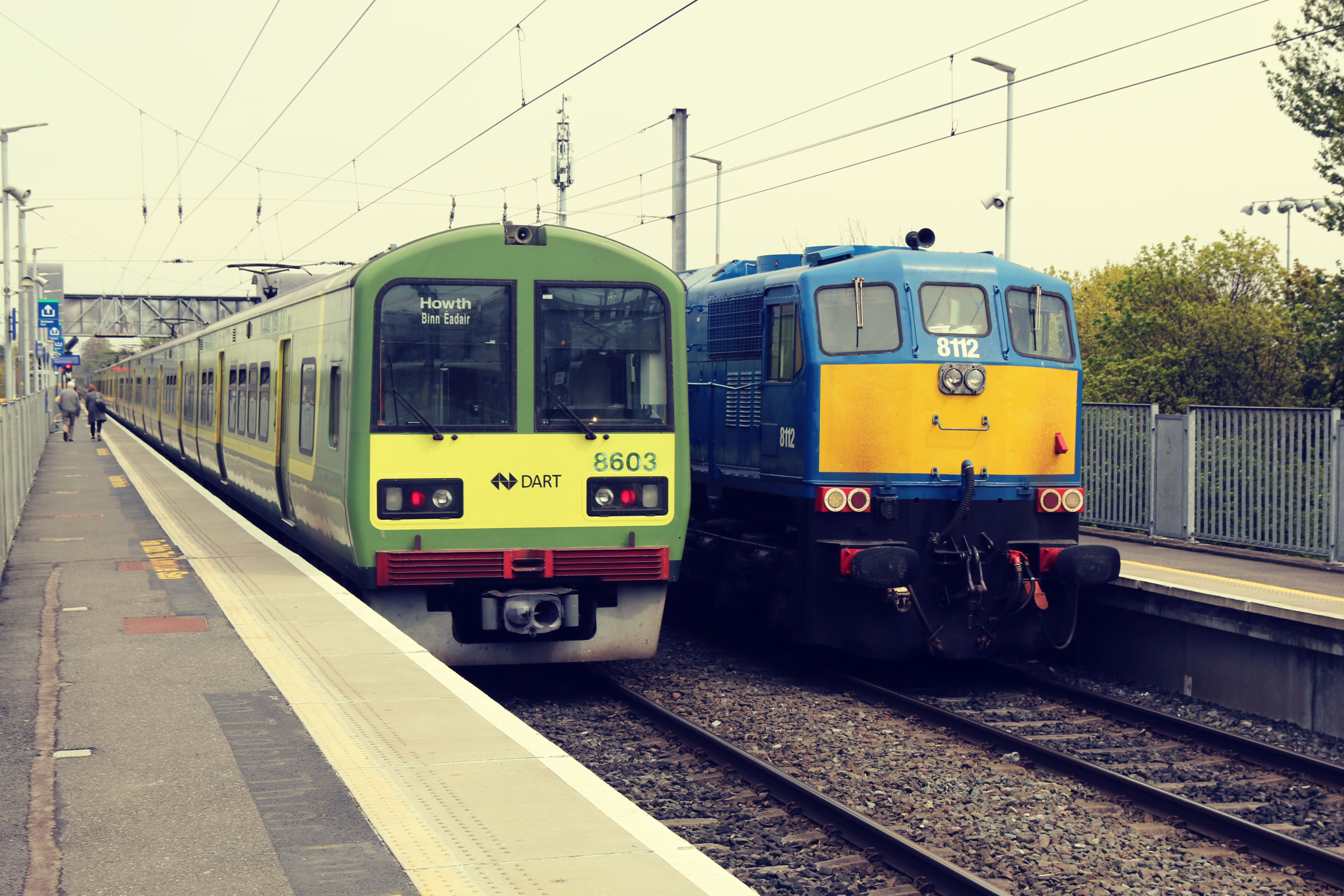
Northern Ireland Railways General Motors class 111, 8112, passing Clontarf Road Dart Station, beside DART 8603, 2022

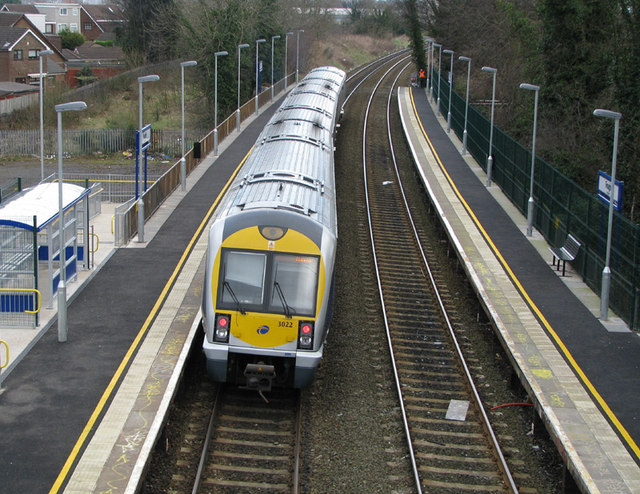
Train departing, Finaghy station Belfast 2008

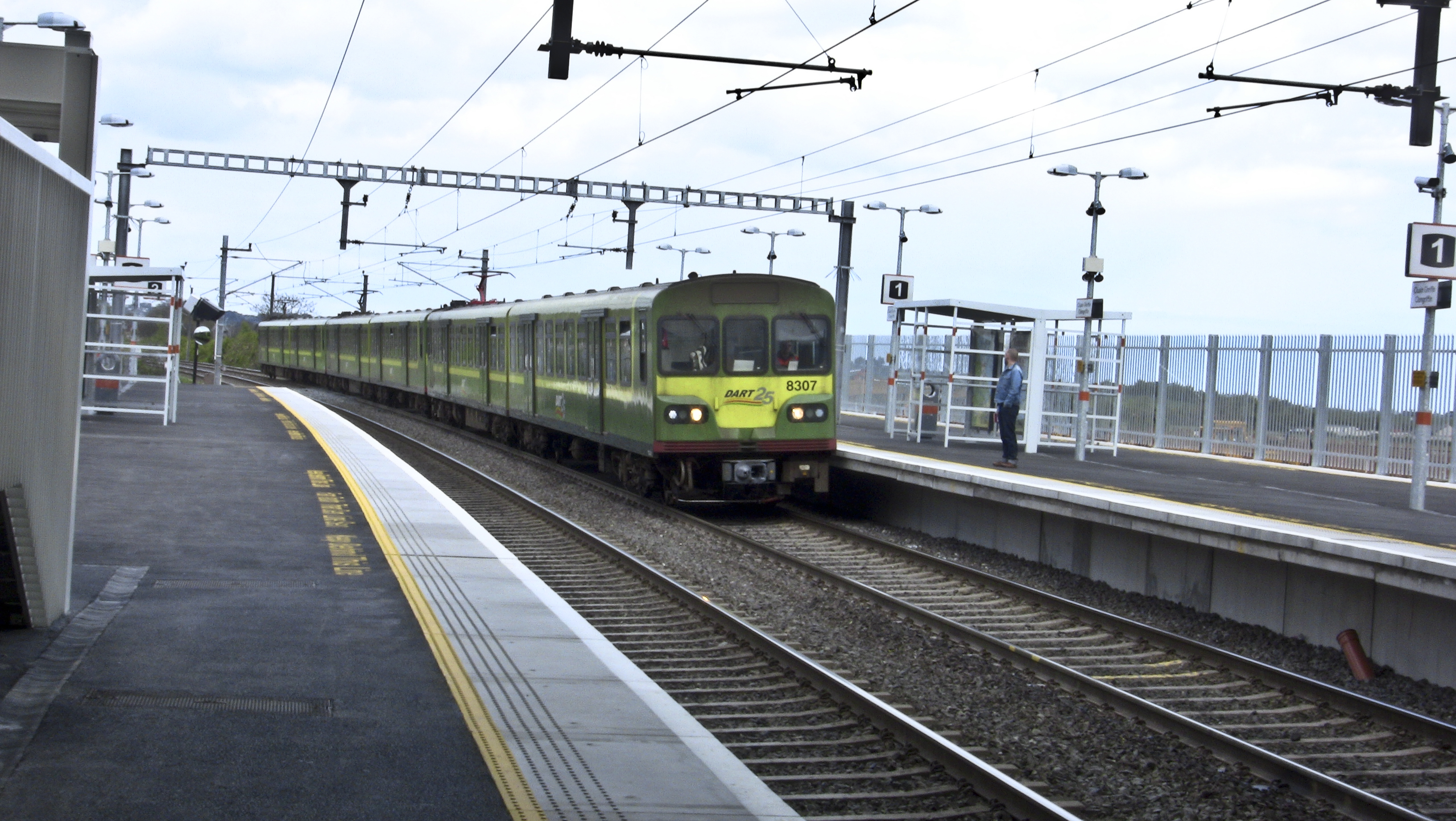
Southbound DART train arrives at Clongriffin 2010

== See also ==
- Contraceptive Train, a women's rights activism event which took place on 22 May 1971 during which women from the Republic of Ireland travelled to Belfast to purchase contraceptives

== Sources ==
- Fullerton, A. (1846). The Parliamentary Gazetter of Ireland, 1844-45. Vol. 2. Dublin, London and Edinburgh: A. Fullerton & Co.
- Hajducki, S. Maxwell (1974). A Railway Atlas of Ireland. Newton Abbott: David & Charles. ISBN 0-7153-5167-2.
- McCutcheon, Alan (1969). Ireland. Railway History in Pictures. Vol. 1. Newton Abbott: David & Charles. ISBN 0-7153-4651-2.
- McQuillan, Jack (26 August 2005). "Building the Boyne Viaduct". The Argus. Independent News and Media.
