= List of canals in Ireland =

This article covers the whole of Ireland, that is, covering both the Republic of Ireland and Northern Ireland

== Navigable canals ==
- Ardnacrusha Canal
- Grand Canal
- Jamestown Canal
- Lecarrow Canal
- Newry Ship Canal
- Royal Canal
- Shannon–Erne Waterway
- Tralee Ship Canal
- Barrow Navigation

== Derelict canals ==
- Athlone Canal
- Ballinasloe Canal
- Boyne Navigation
- Bridgetown Canal
- Broharris Canal
- Coalisland Canal (Tyrone Navigation)
- Cong Canal (Dry Canal)
- Dukart's Canal
- Eglinton Canal
- Lacy's Canal
- Lismore Canal
- Kilkenny Canal
- Killaloe Canal & Plassey–Errina Canal
- Lagan Canal (Lagan Navigation)
- Newry Canal
- Park Canal
- Strabane Canal
- Ulster Canal

== Filled-in branches or spurs ==
- Grand Canal Harbour (near St. James's Gate) branch, Dublin
- Royal Canal branch to Constitution Hill harbour, Dublin (a.k.a. the Broadstone line)

== See also ==
=== Navigable rivers ===
- Barrow Navigation
- Lower Bann Navigation
- River Foyle
- River Lagan
- Lee Navigation
- Munster Blackwater & Bride Navigation
- Shannon Navigation
- Slaney Navigation
- Suck Navigation
- Suir Navigation
- Rivers of Ireland
- List of rivers of Ireland
