= Dukart's Canal =

Failed coal transport system in Ireland

Coordinates: 54.54782°N 6.73539°W

Specifications
- Locks: 3 inclined planes
- Status: defunct

History
- Principal engineer: Davis Dukart
- Date of act: 1767
- Date completed: 1777
- Date closed: 1787

Geography
- Start point: Drumglass
- End point: Coalisland
- Connects to: Coalisland Canal

Dukart's Canal was built to provide transport for coal from the Drumglass Collieries to the Coalisland Canal in County Tyrone, Ulster, Ireland. It opened in 1777, and used three inclined planes, rather than locks, to cope with changes in level. There is little evidence that it was ever used, as the planes could not be made to work properly, and they were dismantled in 1787.

== History ==
Coal seams were discovered at Drumglass, near Coalisland, in the 1690s, and the Tyrone coalfields were seen as a way to reduce the amount of coal imported to Dublin, then amounting to between 60,000 and 70,000 tons per year. Thomas Knox, an owner of one of the collieries, petitioned the Irish Parliament in 1709, to advocate the cutting of a canal to enable the resource to be transported more easily. The canal would have followed a similar route to the later Newry Canal, but nothing came of the plan, although it was well received. The scheme was revived in 1727, and assessed by the Surveyor-General in 1729. Also in 1729, Francis Seymour, the owner of a coal pit at Brackaville, near Coalisland, published a pamphlet in Belfast, titled Remarks on a Scheme for supplying Dublin with Coals. The pamphlet expressed support for Knox's plans of 1709, but also suggested that a canal could be cut from Drumglass to the River Torrent, which would enable small boats to reach the River Blackwater, where the coal could be loaded into larger boats for transport to Newry, and onwards to Dublin.

The Commission of Inland Navigation for Ireland was created in the same year, and authorised the construction of the Newry Canal in 1731. A canal from Coalisland to the Blackwater was authorised the following year, but had the serious disadvantage that it stopped well short of the coalfields. Its construction was extremely slow, and the overland transport of coal to Coalisland increased its cost to customers. To address this situation, a company was created in 1749, prominent members of which included the Church of Ireland Lord Archbishop of Armagh and the Church of Ireland Lord Archbishop of Tuam. They asked Parliament in 1753 for help with building 3 miles (4.8 km) of road, to link Drumglass to Coalisland, and received £4,000 to carry out the work.

It is unclear whether the road was ever completed. In 1760 a parliamentary committee asked Thomas Omer to carry out a survey for a canal between the collieries and the Newry Navigation. Although he carried out the survey, he suggested that a more practical solution would be to build a canal to Coalisland Basin. This would need to be just over 3 miles (4.8 km) long, would require 16 locks, and would cost £15,667. The bed of the River Torrent would be used where possible, and Omer began work in 1761. The committee wanted the canal to be capable of carrying 100-ton ships. Omar passed the supervision of the project on to a British architectural engineer called Christopher Myers in June 1762, who completed around 0.5 miles (0.80 km) of the canal near Coalisland, and built part of the first lock. The waterway was 10 feet (3.0 m) deep, and the lock was 125 by 22 feet (38.1 by 6.7 m). He then reported to Parliament, outlining the likely cost based on the progress to that point, and concluded that it was impracticable to use the bed of the river. He suggested that a canal of the same gauge as the Newry Canal, capable of taking boats 60 by 12 feet (18.3 by 3.7 m) and drawing 3 feet (0.91 m), was a more realistic solution, and could be achieved for £18,141, which included the construction of 14 locks and an aqueduct over the River Torrent.

=== Dukart's Design ===
Although the proposal made by Myers was adopted by Parliament in 1767, and £5,000 granted towards its cost, it was superseded by a plan submitted by Daviso Du Arcort, a Sardinian, otherwise known as Davis Dukart, after a second opinion on the engineering aspects of the project was sought. Dukart's plan was probably influenced by the Bridgewater Canal, which had reached Manchester in 1765. James Brindley, the engineer for that scheme, had used tub boats, capable of carrying 12 tons, and at the Castlefield terminus in Manchester, had constructed a vertical shaft, so that boxes of coal could be raised from the boats to a higher level. Dukart also planned to use 12-ton tub boats. The canal would be built on two levels, the first starting from Coalisland, and running into a tunnel, which would be used to provide drainage for Derry Colliery. A shaft would rise for 148 feet (45 m) above the end of the tunnel, and coal would be lowered down it in boxes, either from the colliery workings, or from boats arriving at the top of the shaft on the upper level. The upper level would cross the River Torrent on a 3-arched aqueduct, and would again end in a tunnel.

The new plan was approved by Parliament, and by November 1767 he had built two small sections and some of the aqueduct. The work had cost £3,839, and he estimated that another £14,457 would be needed to complete the scheme. Three months later, the cost was revised to £26,802, and again the plans were changed. The tunnel sections were replaced by three gravitational inclines originally designed with wooden ramps and rollers. These were located at Brackaville with a rise of 16.8 m (55 ft), at Drumreagh with a rise of 19.8 m (65 ft) and at Farlough with a rise of 21.3 m (70 ft), and were referred to a 'hurries' or 'dry wherries'. The canal sections were completed by mid-1773, but Dukart experienced problems with provision of power to make the inclines work. William Jessop was sent to inspect the works by John Smeaton, both of whom were involved in surveying a route for the proposed Grand Canal from Dublin to the River Shannon. Jessop's report has been lost, but Smeaton recommended converting the inclines to be counterbalanced, increasing the size of the boats from one ton to two, and suggested a winch at the top of the incline to haul the boats over the sill at the end of the level and on to the start of the incline. He also mentioned that he thought a horse railroad would have been better than a canal, in view of the terrain.

Dukart could still not get the inclines to work well, and replaced the rollers with parallel railway tracks, down which the boats were carried on cradles. At the Coalisland basin, the tub boats descended the final 15 feet (4.6 m) on another cradle, which turned them over, to tip their contents into canal boats. The work was finally finished in 1777, and at least one boat travelled along the length of the canal, but the through route to the River Blackwater, along the Coalisland Canal, would not be completed for another ten years. Problems with the new route soon became apparent. The upper section was cut through limestone, and Farlough Lake, one of the canal's water sources, could not supply sufficient volumes of water to overcome seepage. Additionally, the inclines had been made too steep for the counterbalance mechanism to work well. In 1787, when an engineer called Richard Owen was sent by the Corporation for Inland Navigation to inspect the route, he found the hurries suffering from mechanical failure and little water in the upper section. He suggested the replacement of the tub boats by flat-bottomed barges on each level, 40 by 13 feet (12.2 by 4.0 m), each of which would carry two rows of seven wagons. At the inclines, the wagons would be run of the boats, and down inclined roads which would replace the inclines, to be loaded onto another boat at the bottom. Echoing Dukart's first design, he also suggested a new canal, some 3.7 miles (6.0 km) long, running from below Coalisland basin to Drumglass. The final 2.5 miles (4.0 km) or so would be in tunnel, which would also act as a drain for the collieries. His plan did not meet with any official approval.

== Dukart's legacy ==
The canal was the only place where inclines were used within Ireland's waterways. Legend has it that only one tub boat ever came down Dukart's Canal, in 1778. This exercise was completed to help save him from the accusation of serious misuse of public funds, but the inclines were a failure and were dismantled by 1787. Dukart died in 1785.

Very little remains of the canal. Some masonry and a bridge over an incline still exist. Dukart's name is still linked with Newmills and the Coalisland Canal. The most prominent canal structure still extant is the ashlar stone aqueduct at Newmills, built around 1768, where the canal was carried over the River Torrent. The remains of two of the inclines (known locally as Dry Hurries) are still visible. One can be found in Drumreagh near the Brackaville Golf Course. The largest is on the Quintinmanus Road near Newmills (although this one is largely overgrown and is hard to see). The town of Newmills was built around Dukart's failed canal.

Dukart was in many ways way ahead of his time. Inclined planes are frequently used today in different parts of the world in many different guises. It was a very ambitious gamble that unfortunately for Davis Dukart did not pay off.

== See also ==
- Canals of Ireland
- Canals of the United Kingdom

== Bibliography ==
- McCutcheon, W A (1965). The Canals of the North of Ireland. David and Charles. ISBN 978-0-7153-4028-8.
- McIlvenna, Thomas (2005). This Wonder-Working Canal, A History of the Tyrone Navigation (First ed.). Coalisland Canal Branch IWAI.
- Skempton, Sir Alec; et al. (2002). A Biographical Dictionary of Civil Engineers in Great Britain and Ireland: 1500 to 1830. Thomas Telford. ISBN 978-0-7277-2939-2.
- Uhlemann, Hans-Joachim (2002). Canal lifts and inclines of the world (English Translation ed.). Internat. ISBN 978-0-9543181-1-6.
