= White House Cemetery =

WWI CWGC cemetery in Ypres, Belgium

White House, Ypres
- Commonwealth War Graves Commission
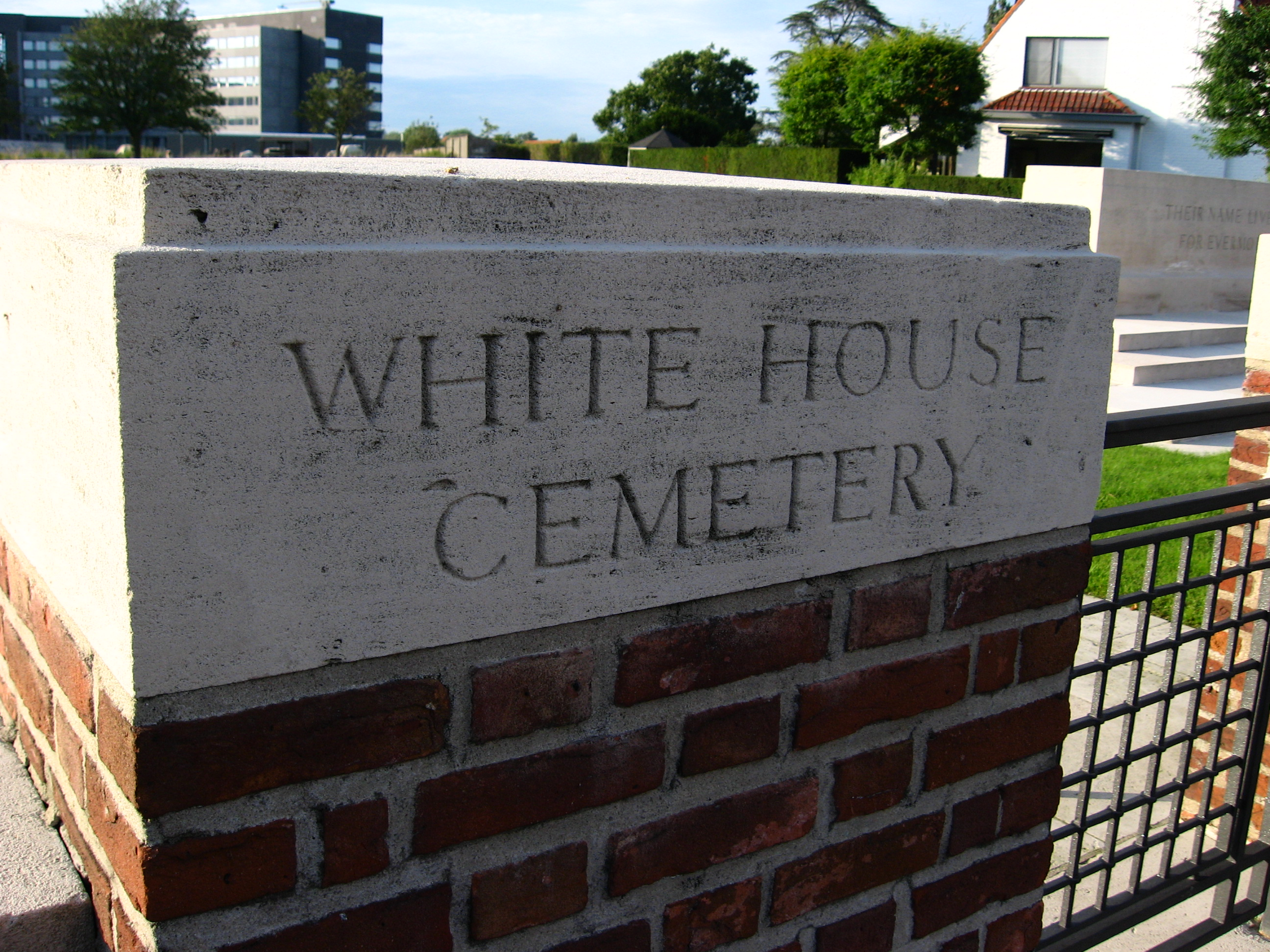
- Used for those deceased 1915–1918
- Established: 1915
- Location: 50°51′43″N 02°53′55″E near Ypres, West Flanders, Belgium
- Designed by: Sir Reginald Blomfield
- Total burials: 1,171
- Unknowns: 323

Burials by nation
- Allied Powers: United Kingdom 1,002; Canada: 85; Australia: 45; New Zealand: 25; South Africa: 5; Undivided India: 1; Bermuda: 1

Burials by war
- World War I: 1163 World War II: 8
- Statistics source: WW1Cemeteries.com and CWGC

White House Cemetery is a Commonwealth War Graves Commission (CWGC) burial ground for the dead of the First World War located in the Ypres Salient on the Western Front in Belgium.

The cemetery grounds were assigned to the United Kingdom in perpetuity by King Albert I of Belgium in recognition of the sacrifices made by the British Empire in the defence and liberation of Belgium during the war.

== Foundation ==
The cemetery was founded by Commonwealth troops in March 1915 and remained in use until April 1918. After the Armistice in November 1918, the cemetery was enlarged by concentrating graves from eight outlying cemeteries.

The cemetery was designed by Sir Reginald Blomfield who was also responsible for the nearby Menin Gate memorial.

== Notable graves ==
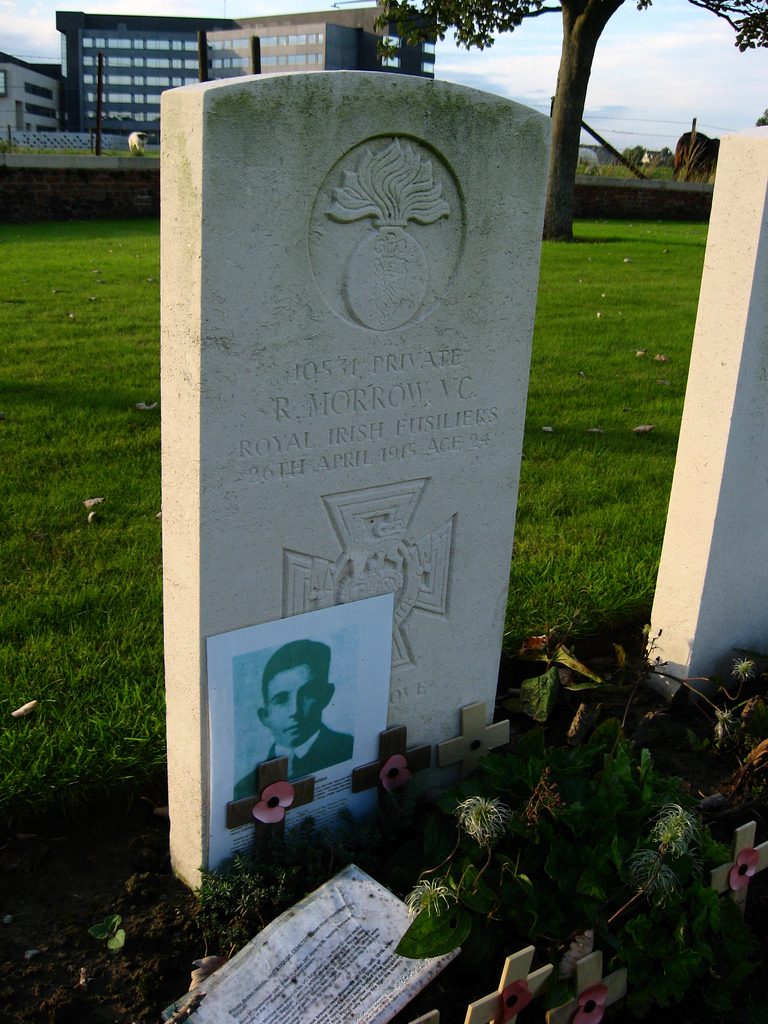
The grave of Robert Morrow VC

The cemetery contains the graves of some 1,163 soldiers of the Great War. Amongst these are the graves of four men executed by the Commonwealth military authorities – Private HH Chase of the Lancashire Fusiliers, executed for cowardice on 12 June 1915; Private WJ Turpie of the Queen's Royal West Surrey Regiment, executed for desertion on 1 July 1915; and Privates RW Gawler and AE Eveleigh of The Buffs (East Kent Regiment), executed for desertion 24 February 1916. Private Turpie reached the United Kingdom about a month after deserting. He was apprehended by the police and confessed to being a deserter. Brought back to the Front, he was convicted at a court martial and subsequently executed. On 7 November 2006, the British government reversed its previous decision and announced a pardon for all soldiers executed in the Great War.

Also buried at this cemetery is Victoria Cross-holder Private Robert Morrow of the Royal Irish Fusiliers. World War I flying ace William Edward Green and WWII Army officer is buried here.
