= Lynn brothers =

Irish British Army brothers killed in WWI

The Lynn brothers were four siblings from Coalisland, County Tyrone, who served in the British Army during the First World War. Three were killed during the conflict between 1915 and 1916, and the fourth died on active service in 1920, making their deaths one of the most notable multiple‑sibling losses from Ireland.

== Background ==
James, Robert, John, and William Lynn were the sons of James Lynn Sr., a railway porter at Dungannon railway station who later became a farmer, and Elizabeth Lynn (née Abernethy), a dressmaker. They lived on a farm in the townland of Mousetown, just outside Coalisland, County Tyrone, Ireland, and the brothers had three sisters.

== Military service and deaths ==
All four Lynn brothers enlisted in the British Army during the First World War. Their service spanned several regiments and theatres of war, and each died in active service between 1915 and 1920.

- Driver Robert Lynn (1885-1915), Royal Field Artillery, was the first to die. He was killed in action on 6 August 1915 at Ypres, Belgium, while transporting ammunition under sniper and artillery fire, one of the most hazardous duties on the Western Front. He is buried at Hop Store Cemetery.
- Sergeant William Edward Lynn (1895-1916), Royal Irish Fusiliers (1st Battalion), was killed on 17 July 1916 during the Battle of the Somme. He died while attempting to retrieve a stretcher to rescue a wounded comrade, and was described by a fellow soldier as having died "a hero’s death". He is buried at Auchonvillers Military Cemetery in France.
- Private John Lynn (1887-1916), Royal Inniskilling Fusiliers (1st Battalion), died in a gas attack on 9 August 1916, also at Ypres. He is buried at Lijssenthoek Military Cemetery just a few miles from his brother Robert.
- Sergeant James Lynn (1882-1920), Army Service Corps, was the eldest and the last to die. After the deaths of his brothers, he was temporarily sent home in 1917, but later re-enlisted. He was posted to Palestine, where he died on 7 August 1920 in Haifa. In a final letter to his mother, he referred to himself as "last of the line". He is buried at Haifa War Cemetery.

== Legacy ==
A marble memorial plaque in the Church of Ireland, Coalisland, commemorates the four brothers. It was erected by their parents, it lists each son by name, along with his regiment and the date and place of death. The inscription includes the line:

"God is good, He will give us grace, to bear our heavy cross. He is the only one who knows how bitter is our loss".

Although the Lynn surname ended with James, the name continued to be used within the extended family. In subsequent generations, "Lynn" was adopted as a middle name and, in some cases, as a first name by descendants of the brothers' sisters.

== See also ==
- Coalisland
- History of Ireland (1801–1923)
- Royal Inniskilling Fusiliers
- Royal Field Artillery
- Royal Army Service Corps
- Royal Irish Fusiliers
- WW1
