= Donaghmore, County Tyrone =

- village, townland, civil parish
- Coordinates: 54°32′N 6°49′W

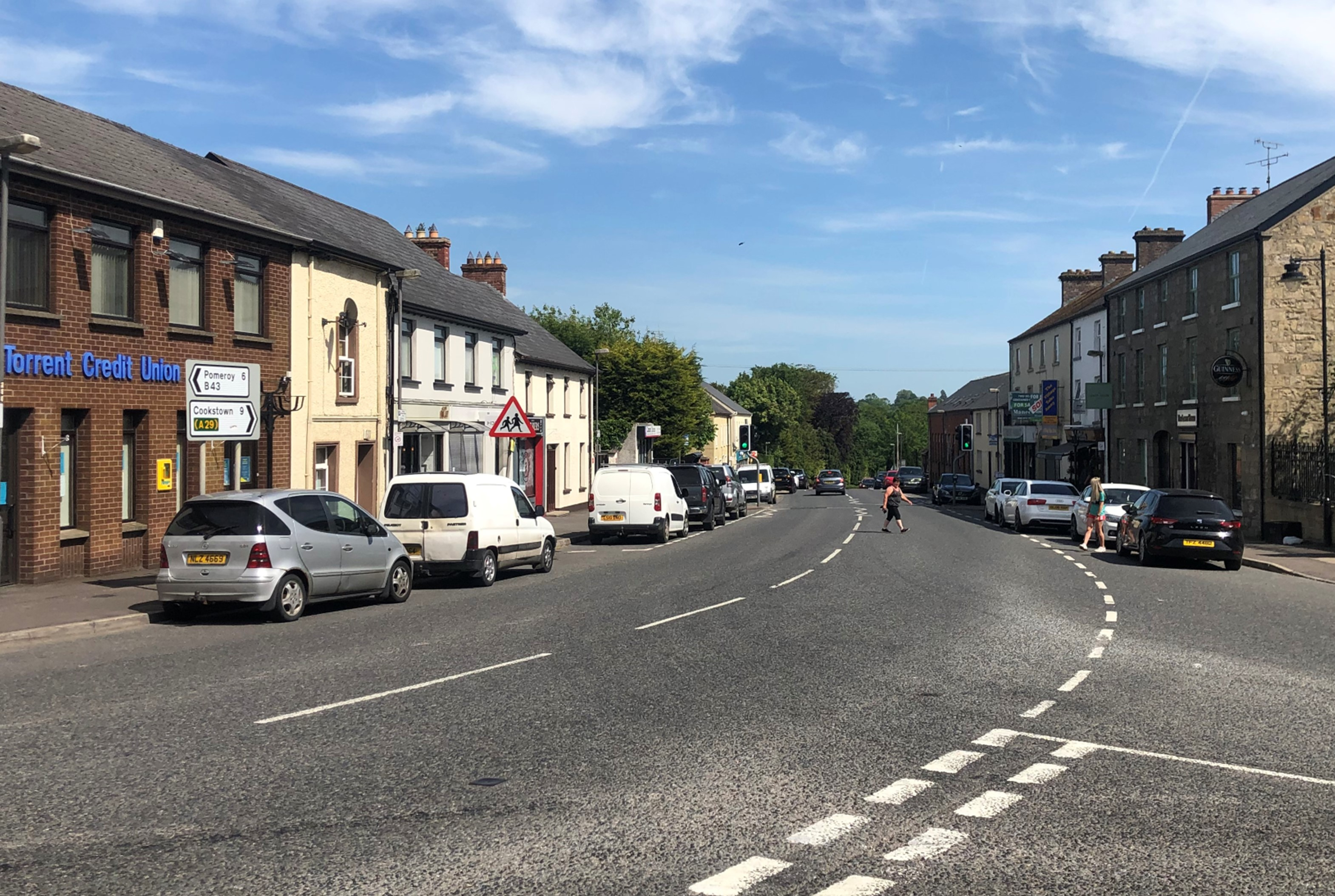
Donaghmore Main Street (March 2020)

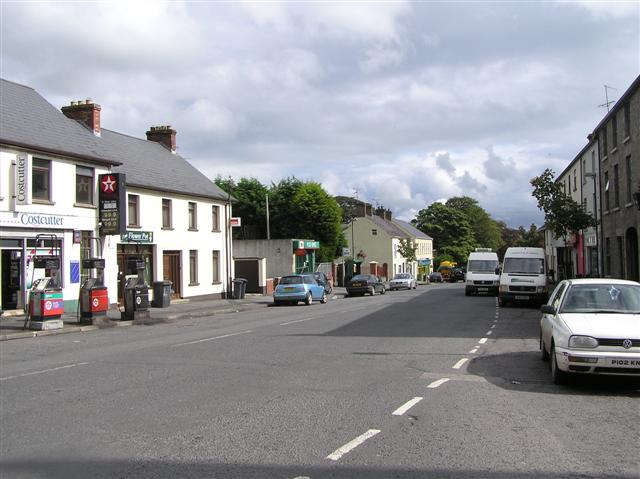
Donaghmore main street (c. 2003)

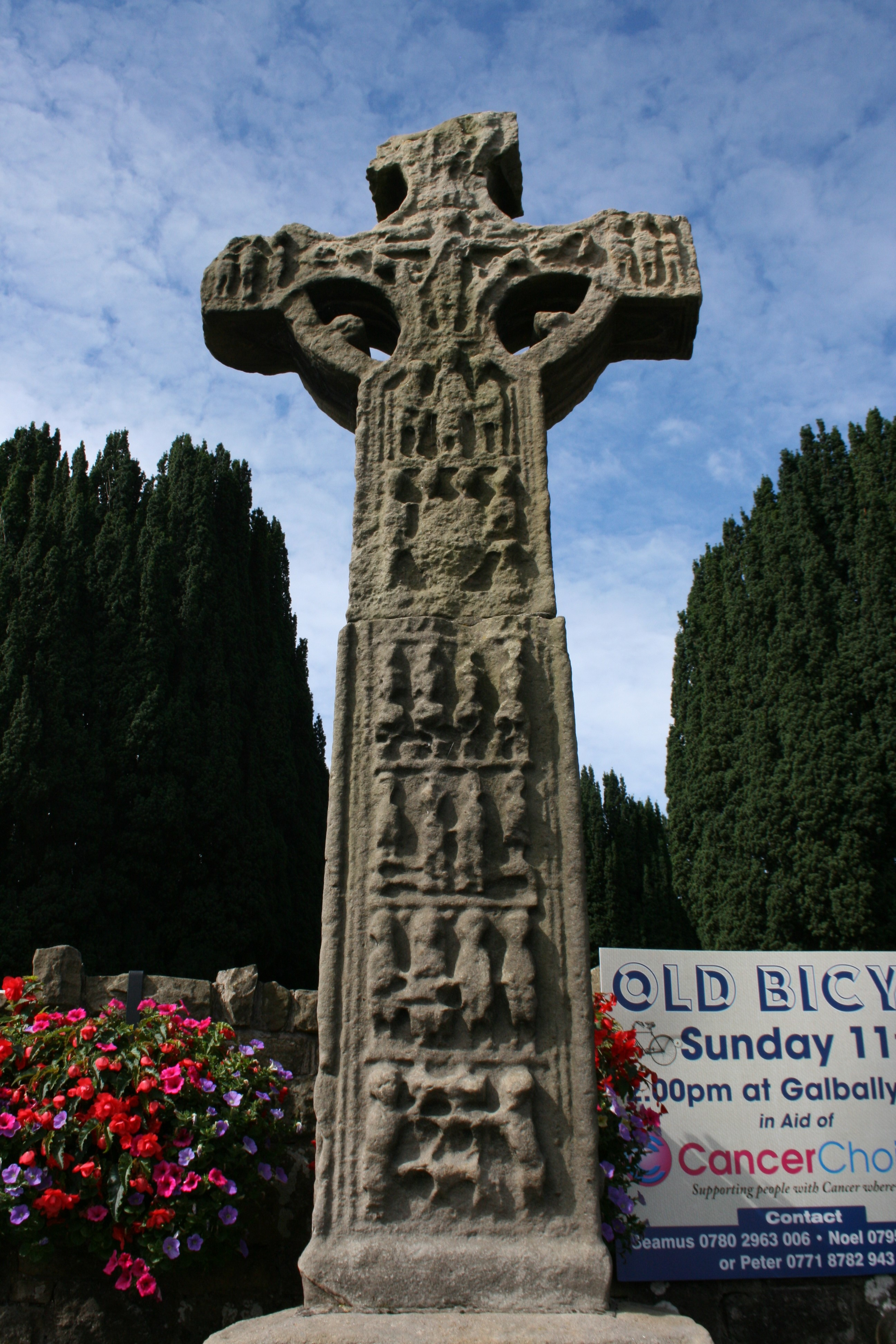
Donaghmore Cross 1

Donaghmore (pronounced /ˌdoʊnəˈmɔːr/ DOH-nə-MOR, Irish: Domhnach Mór (great church)) is a village, townland and civil parish in County Tyrone, Northern Ireland, about five kilometres (3 mi) north-west of Dungannon. In the 2011 Census it had a population of 1,122 people. The village is beside the River Torrent, formerly known as the Torrent Flow.

== History ==
=== Etymology ===
The name Donaghmore derives from the Irish words Domhnach Mór, meaning "great church". This however is a shortened form of its original medieval name Domhnach Mór Magh Imchlair (also spelt in Clair), the "great church in the plain of Imchlair", referring to the territory of the Fir Imchlair in which it lay. It was according to the Tripartite Life of St. Patrick founded by the saint for the Fir Imchlair.

=== The Troubles ===
For more information see The Troubles in Donaghmore, which includes a list of incidents in Donaghmore during the Troubles resulting in two or more fatalities.

== Demography ==
=== 19th century population ===
The population of the village decreased during the 19th century:

Year	1841	1851	1861	1871	1881	1891
Population	542	430	433	351	299	234
Houses	109	104	108	79	87	80

=== 21st century population ===
Donaghmore is classified as a Small Village by the NI Statistics and Research Agency (NISRA) (i.e. with population between 500 and 1,000 people). On Census day (29 April 2001) there were 947 people living in Donaghmore. Of these:

- 26.0% were aged under 16 years and 14.3% were aged 60 and over
- 46.6% of the population were male and 53.4% were female
- 89.2% were from a Catholic background and 10.4% were from a Protestant background

For more details see: NI Neighbourhood Information Service

== Places of interest ==
- Donaghmore Heritage Centre is a converted National School (1885) which preserves photographs, old school roll books, land registration ledgers, documents and artifacts of local interest.
- The village also features a high cross which is six metres tall. It is one of Ulster's finest early christian monuments. It is a composite of two crosses. The upper shaft and head dates from the 9th century. The composite cross is said to have been thrown down in the 17th century. It was discovered buried in the Torrent river and re-erected in 1776. The west face of the cross has Old Testament scenes while the east face has a crucifixion scene and New Testament scenes on the shaft.
- A stone pillar stands in the old graveyard to the memory of Hugh O'Neill, 3rd Earl of Tyrone, erected by one of his descendants.
- The Rotharlann is unused currently, but it was busy in its heyday in the mid-1980s. Used mainly by the local cyclists, it also hosted discos that attracted youngsters from all over the country and was a local hot spot for "other" activities. A small campaign is gathering momentum to get the hall restored to its former glories.
- Torrent Complex

A complex of buildings where most activities take place such as GAA and more

== Notable people ==
- Malachi Cush, singer
- Niall McGinn, winger for Aberdeen and Northern Ireland
- James Dilworth, farmer, investor, speculator and philanthropist

== Sport ==
- Donaghmore St. Patrick's is the local Gaelic Athletic Association club.
- St Joseph's Grammar School have won 2 Nolan Cup and 1 Mallon Cup in Ulster College GAA. They won their first Ulster title (Nolan Cup) in the 2010 and their second in 2013 and in the same year won the Mallon Cup In u14's
- Donaghmore F.C. is the local football club and play in the Mid-Ulster Division 1

== Donaghmore Townland ==
The townland is situated in the historic barony of Dungannon Middle and the civil parish of Donaghmore and covers an area of 91 acres.

The population of the townland increased slightly during the 19th century:

Year	1841	1851	1861	1871	1812	1891
Population	12	-	-	11	10	13
Houses	3	-	-	3	3	2

In 1891, the village of Donaghmore, which stands in the townland of the same name, had an estimated area of 13 acres.

== See also ==
- Abbeys and priories in Northern Ireland (County Tyrone)
- List of towns in Northern Ireland
- List of villages in Northern Ireland
- List of civil parishes of County Tyrone
- List of townlands of County Tyrone
