= Ballykelly, County Londonderry =

Village in County Londonderry, Northern Ireland

Coordinates: 55.0445°N 7.01576°W

Ballykelly: Irish: Baile Uí Cheallaigh
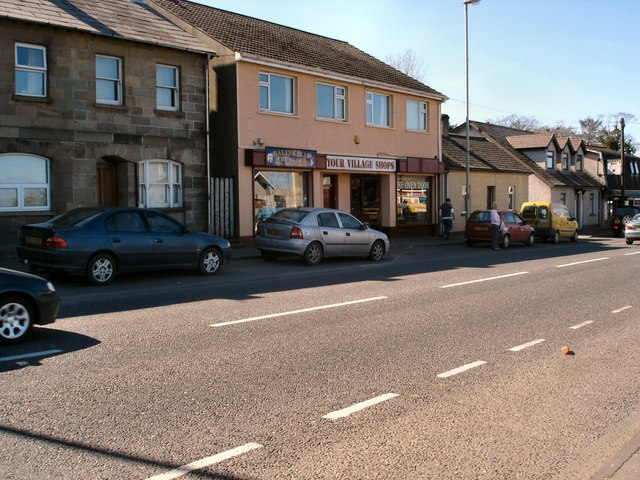
- The village centre, located on the A2

- Location within Northern Ireland
- Population: 2,004 (2021 census)
- District: Causeway Coast and Glens
- County: County Londonderry
- Country: Northern Ireland
- Sovereign state: United Kingdom
- Post town: LIMAVADY
- Postcode district: BT49
- Dialling code: 028
- Police: Northern Ireland
- Fire: Northern Ireland
- Ambulance: Northern Ireland
- UK Parliament: East Londonderry

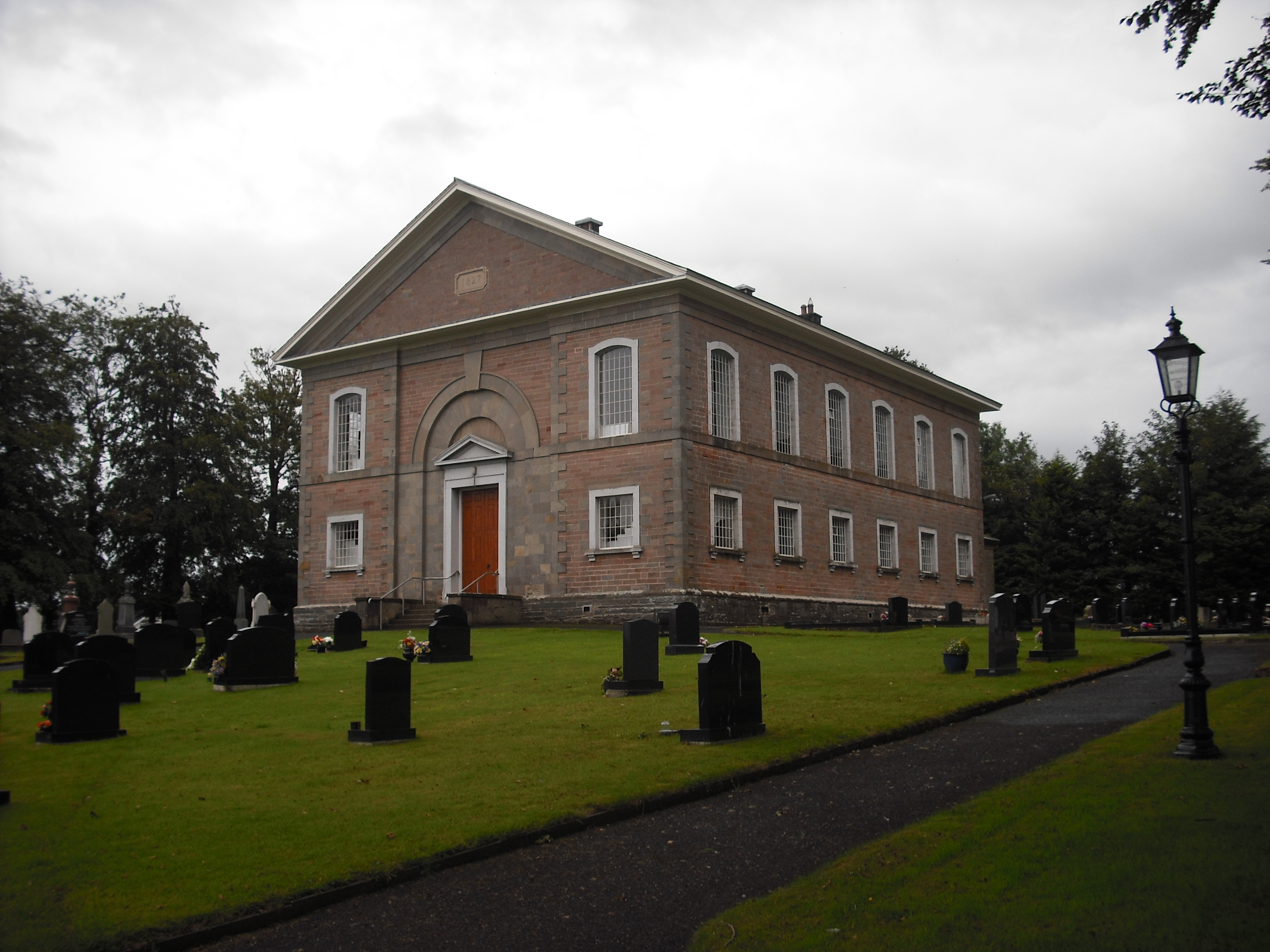
Ballykelly Presbyterian Church, built 1827

Ballykelly (from Irish Baile Uí Cheallaigh, meaning 'O'Kelly's Townland') is a village and townland in County Londonderry, Northern Ireland. It lies 3 miles (4.8 km) west of Limavady on the main Derry to Limavady A2 road and is 15 miles (24 km) east of Derry. It is designated as a Large Village and in 2021 the population of Ballykelly was 2,004. It lies within Causeway Coast and Glens district.

== Features ==
Ballykelly contains some of the most interesting buildings erected in Ulster by the Plantation companies, being largely developed by the London Company of Fishmongers through the 18th and 19th centuries. It features Tamlaghtfinlagan Parish Church, built by Earl Frederick Hervey, 18th-century Bishop of Derry, amongst many traditional buildings. The Presbyterian Church, Drummond Hotel and North West Independent Hospital, were all built by the London Company of Fishmongers. The village enjoys views across Lough Foyle to Inishowen in County Donegal and is bordered by Ballykelly Forest which was the first State Forest in Northern Ireland.

== Politics ==
The village lies within the East Londonderry constituency and is represented by Democratic Unionist Party (DUP) member, Gregory Campbell.

== History ==
The village was originally laid out as a Plantation settlement. The development of the nearby World War II airfield greatly enhanced the size and significance of the village.

RAF Ballykelly opened in 1941 as an airfield RAF Coastal Command and closed in 1971, because of the British Government's defence cuts. The station was transferred to the British Army, who renamed it Shackleton Barracks. The Army was due to leave Shackleton Barracks in early 2008. During World War II an RAF bomber aeroplane on a training run clipped a telephone line behind a church in Ballykelly and crashed, claiming the lives of the crew. The aircraft was carrying out a trials mission involving low level parachuting, but a parachute became entangled with the tailplane, putting the aircraft out of control.

During the Northern Irish Troubles the Droppin Well bombing occurred in Ballykelly, killing 17 people in a local disco and bar. Although one of the most fatal single incidents of the conflict, it was the only fatal Troubles-related incident to take place in Ballykelly.

Christianity in the area can be traced back to 585, with the remains of a catholic church/ abbey / Monastery (Tamlaght Finlagan Monastery). The remains of which are accessible via the Tully Road. This is an old abbey founded by St. Colmcille for St. Fionnlogha. Little is known about why the chapel fell into ruins, but the original site had a round tower and had erenagh until the 17th century.

== Places of interest ==
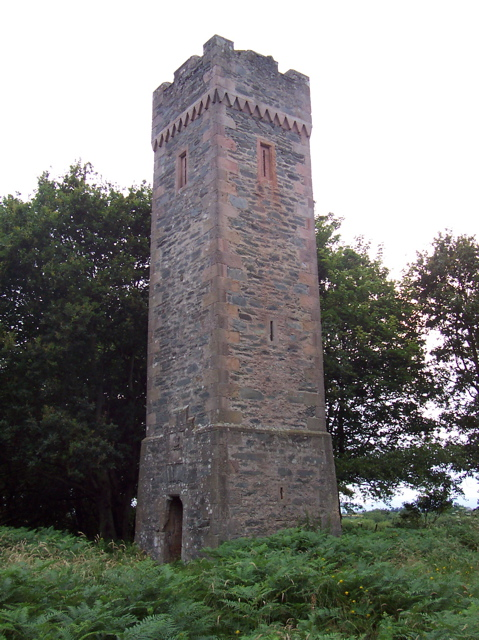
Sampson's Tower

- Ballykelly Forest is located west of the village. Also known as the Camman Wood, it was a popular haunt for highwaymen terrorising the coach road from Coleraine to Derry.
- Between Limavady and Ballykelly is Rough Fort, one of the best preserved earthworks in the province. It covers approximately 1 acre (0.40 ha).
- Nearby is Sampson's Tower, a fortified structure built by public subscription in memory of Arthur Sampson who for 40 years was an agent of the London Worshipful Company of Fishmongers.
- The village hosts Shackleton Barracks, which became famous when a commercial airliner on a Ryanair service landed there by mistake on 29 March 2006, instead of at City of Derry Airport.
- Behind the Kings Lane Estate there are the remains of the Lough Shore Base Line trigpoint. This is one of three towers created to verify a mapping baseline for Ireland. ,

== Demography ==
Ballykelly is classified as a village by the Northern Ireland Statistics and Research Agency (NISRA) (i.e., with a population of between 1,000 and 2,250 people). On Census day (27 March 2011) there were 2,107 people living in Ballykelly. Of these:

- 23.26% were aged under 16 and 9.63% were aged 65 and over
- 50.17% of the population were male and 49.83% were female
- 58.33% were from a Catholic background and 38.59% were from a Protestant or other Christian background
- 48.13% indicated that they had a British national identity, 23.73% had an Irish national identity, and 31.51% had a Northern Irish national identity
- 8.55% of people aged 16–74 were unemployed.

== Climate ==
Ballykelly has an oceanic climate (Cfb) with mild summers and cool winters.

Climate data for Ballykelly (Derry Airport 1991–2020)
Month	Jan	Feb	Mar	Apr	May	Jun	Jul	Aug	Sep	Oct	Nov	Dec	Year
Mean daily maximum °C (°F)	8.1 (46.6)	8.6 (47.5)	10.3 (50.5)	12.5 (54.5)	15.3 (59.5)	17.4 (63.3)	19.0 (66.2)	18.7 (65.7)	16.9 (62.4)	13.6 (56.5)	10.5 (50.9)	8.3 (46.9)	13.3 (55.9)
Mean daily minimum °C (°F)	2.7 (36.9)	2.5 (36.5)	3.6 (38.5)	5.1 (41.2)	7.3 (45.1)	9.9 (49.8)	11.7 (53.1)	11.6 (52.9)	10.0 (50.0)	7.3 (45.1)	4.7 (40.5)	2.8 (37.0)	6.6 (43.9)
Average precipitation mm (inches)	83.5 (3.29)	70.1 (2.76)	61.6 (2.43)	54.0 (2.13)	52.9 (2.08)	59.6 (2.35)	70.2 (2.76)	76.4 (3.01)	61.9 (2.44)	83.4 (3.28)	91.7 (3.61)	95.7 (3.77)	861 (33.91)
Average precipitation days (≥ 1 mm)	17.0	14.5	14.5	12.0	12.7	12.5	14.0	14.3	13.7	15.5	17.7	17.3	175.7
Average relative humidity (%)	85	83	78	73	74	75	77	79	80	82	85	86	80
Average dew point °C (°F)	3 (37)	4 (39)	4 (39)	6 (43)	8 (46)	11 (52)	12 (54)	12 (54)	11 (52)	9 (48)	6 (43)	4 (39)	8 (46)
Mean monthly sunshine hours	52.4	74.3	107.4	164.1	204.7	161.3	145.6	148.8	119.9	84.6	58.4	37.0	1,358.5
Mean daily sunshine hours	1.7	2.6	3.3	5.2	6.5	5.4	4.5	4.6	4.0	3.3	1.9	1.2	3.7
Average ultraviolet index	0	1	2	3	5	6	6	5	3	2	1	0	3
Source 1: UK Met Office
Source 2: Time and Date (humidity and dew points) Weather Atlas (UV index and daily sunshine hours)

== Transport ==
- The City of Derry Airport is 6 miles (10 km) to the west.
- The Broharris Canal was constructed in the 1820s.
- Ballykelly railway station opened on 29 December 1852 and closed on 20 September 1954. There are currently no rail links serving Ballykelly, although the Derry to Belfast railway line runs nearby.

== Sport ==
- Gaelic football is played at Glack GAC which encompasses players from Ballykelly and the Glack area.
- Camogie is also played at Glack GAC for ladies.
- The Nedd CC is the local cricket team in Ballykelly, and currently play in Senior League 2 of the North West Cricket Union.

== Education ==
- Ballykelly Primary School
- St. Finlough's Primary School, Glack, Ballykelly

== Religion ==
- The current Catholic chapel is called St Finlough's and is on the Loughermore Road. Catholicism in the area can be traced back to 585 however, with the remains of a Chapel (the old Tamlaght Finlagan Chapel) and ancient Abbey, being accessible via the Tully Road. This is an old abbey founded by St. Colmcille for St. Fionnlogha. Little is known about why the chapel fell into ruins, but the original site had a round tower and had erenagh until the 17th century. Indeed its ruin coincides with the Plantation of Ulster and the implementation of penal laws which targeted the catholic population. The whereabouts of catholic worship in the area is not clear for some time after this site was ruined. The catholic presence recovered in the village, with the establishment of a small chapel called "The Hollow" in 1796, after the Roman Catholic Relief Act 1791 allowed catholics to legally exercise their religion. The small chapel was only allowed to be built after an influential Protestant vouched for the loyalty of the people. A branch of the Beresford family, living at Walworth, Ballykelly, were landlords of the district and gave the necessary guarantee. The Hollow was placed where the graveyard is at the present site. The Hollow is best described in a poem called "The Old Hollow Church" by James Carten. The current chapel building, called St.Finlough's, was completed in 1849.

- The Anglican parish of Tamlaghtfinlagan originally was located 1-mile (1.6 km) southwest of the current village. The village is recorded in Papal Bulls of the mid-12th century. The name Tamlaghtfinlagan comes from the Irish for "the resting place of Finliganus", one of Columba's monks who was, according to tradition, the founding abbot of the abbey. This abbey building still exists, although in ruins. In the mid-16th century the parish church moved to Walworth. The current edifice was dedicated in 1795, and is a simple perpendicular church, with three aisles, a small chancel and a gallery, much of which was built by the Worshipful Company of Fishmongers.

- Presbyterian Church was built in 1827 by the Fishmongers Company, London and is a listed grade A building.

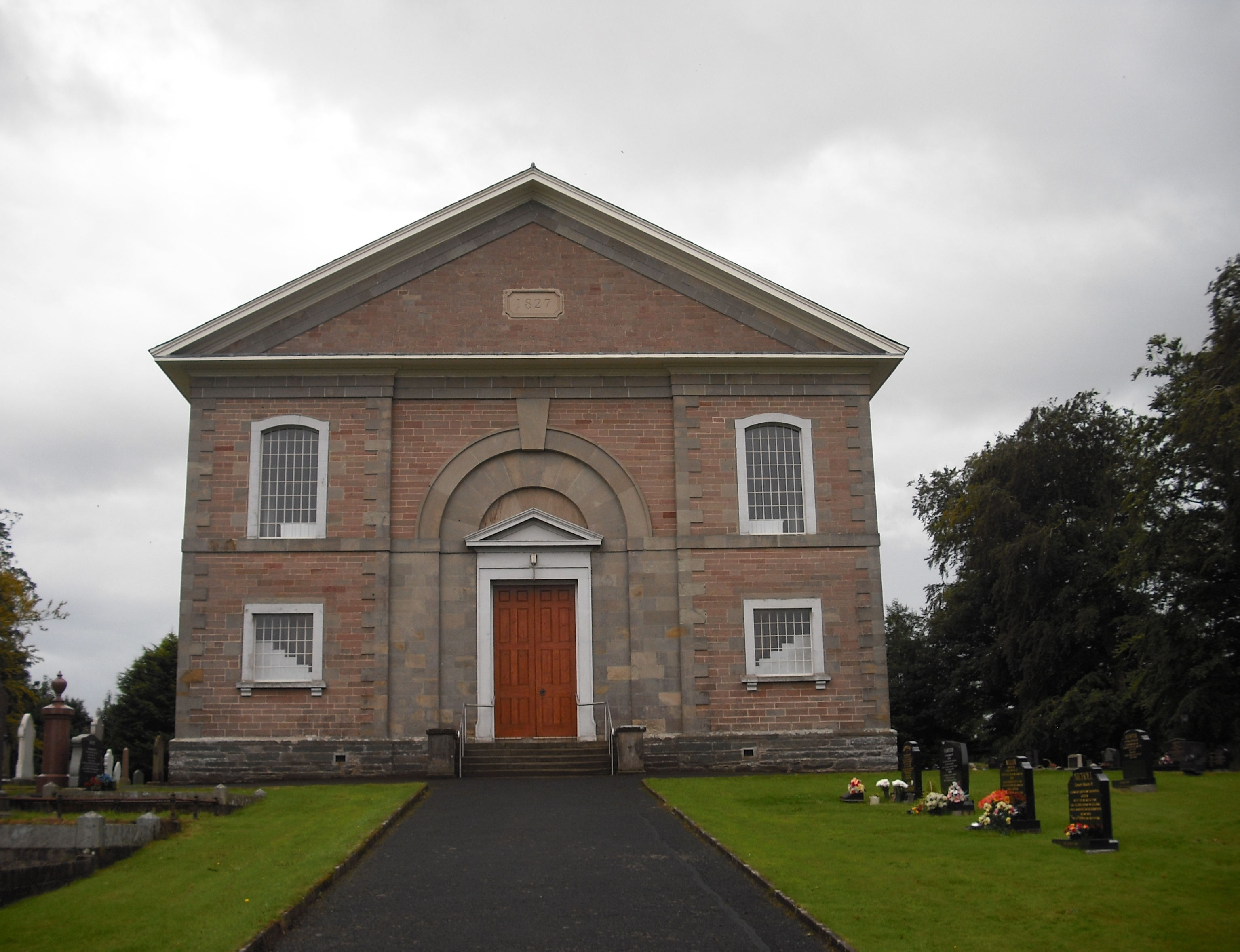
Ballykelly Presbyterian Church, built 1827.

== Notable people ==
- Sally Brown, Paralympic athlete, hails from Ballykelly.
