= Tamlaght Finlagan Monastery =

6th century Irish monastery

Coordinates: 55.0404°N 6.9807°W

Tamlaght Finlagan Monastery was an early religious settlement in Tamlaght Finlagan, Ballykelly, County Londonderry, Northern Ireland. It was originally constructed as a Roman Catholic monastery but fell into ruins before the site was used as the location for a Church of Ireland parish church.

== Monastery ==
The monastery was founded in 585 AD. It was founded by St Columba. The name of the monastery means "The plague monument of St. Findluganus". Findluganus was an associate of St. Columba, who attended the Drumceatt Synod of 574 AD. When it was completed, Findluganus became its first abbot. The monastery also had a round tower constructed as a part of it to protect the monks from Irish raiders. The abbey became a parish church and is mentioned in some papal paperwork in 1291. However, by 1622 the church was in ruins, which can still be seen today.

== Parish church ==
Despite the ruins, a church was restored there in 1622 by the City of London's Worshipful Company of Fishmongers as they had been granted ownership of the land around it. They rebuilt the church, adding a chancel and referred to it as the Garrison Church. It was subsequently damaged and rebuilt several times until 1692 when King William III of Ireland ordered that it be restored for the Church of Ireland. In 1795, the Bishop of Derry, Frederick Hervey, 4th Earl of Bristol, reconstructed the church with it being regularly extended until 1935. In 1831, the local residents petitioned the Parliament of the United Kingdom of Great Britain and Ireland to abolish the tithes connected to the church. In the graveyard connected to it are 17 burials from the Second World War, managed by the Commonwealth War Graves Commission.
