= Royal Irish Fusiliers Museum =

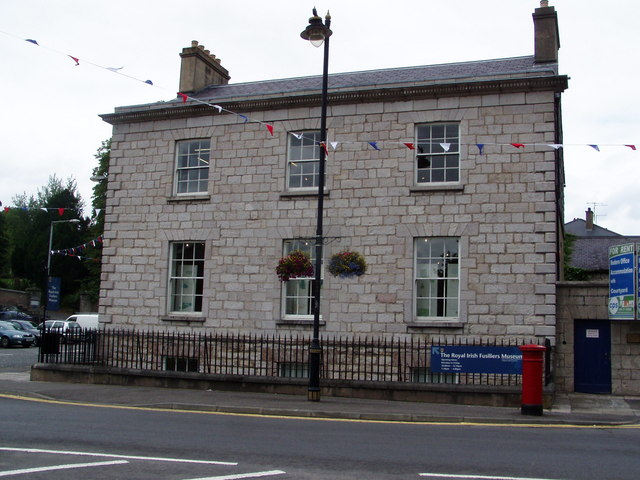
- Royal Irish Fusiliers Museum

- Shown in Northern Ireland
- Established: 1997
- Location: Armagh, Northern Ireland
- Coordinates: 54.35079°N 6.65150°W
- Website: royalirishfusiliersmuseum.com

The Royal Irish Fusiliers Museum is a military museum based in Sovereign's House at Armagh, Northern Ireland. The museum is a Grade B listed building.

== History ==
The museum is located in a building which was built in the early 19th century on land previously owned by the church but leased by the Rt. Rev. William Newcome, Archbishop of Armagh, to the Sovereign and burgesses of the City of Armagh. Originally a residential property, it was converted for use as a museum and opened to the public in 1997.

== Collection ==
The collection includes the Victoria Crosses awarded to Private Robert Morrow and to Lieutenant Geoffrey Cather of the Royal Irish Fusiliers on the Western Front during the First World War. Other highlights include a model demonstrating how Ensign Edward Keogh and Sergeant Patrick Masterson of the 87th (Royal Irish Fusiliers) Regiment of Foot captured a French Imperial Eagle at the Battle of Barrosa in March 1811 during the Peninsular War. The Eagle itself has been lost but the staff on which it had been placed is still held by the museum.
