= River Torrent =

River in Northern Ireland

Coordinates: 54.50429°N 6.63789°W

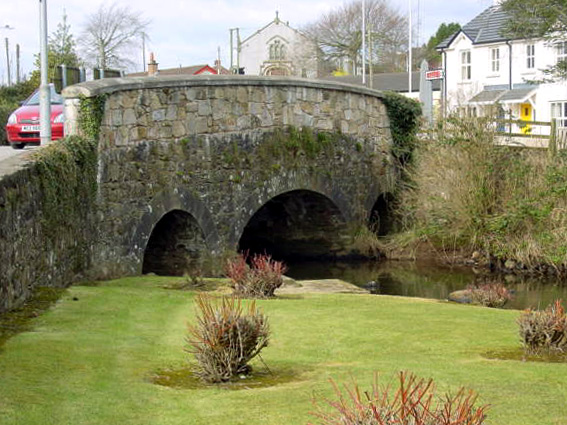
River Torrent in Newmills

River Torrent is a river in County Tyrone, Northern Ireland which enters the River Blackwater approximately 4 km (2.5 mi) from Maghery ferry. It previously acted as a source of industrial waterpower. The river runs through the small village of Newmills in East Tyrone, situated three miles north of Dungannon. Donaghmore village is situated adjacent to the River Torrent, formerly known as the Torrent Flow.

== Geology ==
The Torrent is a long meandering river, which drains the hills to the north-west of Dungannon. The underlying geology is varied and includes basal clastic, carboniferous limestone, coal and Old Red Sandstone. In the upper reaches, the river channel is shallow and narrow with pebble/cobble substrate and sandy banks. Downstream the banks are vegetated with tall grasses and native tree species. There are also fishing weirs. In its lower reaches, the Torrent widens and runs parallel to the Coalisland Canal.

== Dukart's Canal ==
Dukart's Canal was built to provide transport for coal from the Drumglass Collieries to the Coalisland Canal, in County Tyrone. The most prominent canal structure still extant is the ashlar stone aqueduct at Newmills, built around 1778, where the canal was carried over the River Torrent.

== See also ==
- List of rivers of Ireland
