= John Lambert (British Army officer, born 1817) =

English cricketer and British Army officer

General John Lambert
- Born: John Arthur Lambert; 30 September 1817; France
- Died: 17 September 1887 (aged 69); Thames Ditton, Surrey, England
- Relatives: John Lambert (father)
- Military career
- Allegiance: United Kingdom
- Branch: British Army
- Service years: 1835–1881
- Rank: General
- Units: Grenadier Guards; 89th Regiment of Foot; Royal Irish Fusiliers
- Cricket career

Cricket information

Domestic team information
- Years: Team
- 1842: Marylebone Cricket Club

Career statistics
Competition	First-class
Matches	2
Runs scored	15
Batting average	5.00
100s/50s	0/0
Top score	11
Catches/stumpings	1/–
- Source: CricInfo, 4 August 2025

General John Arthur Lambert (30 September 1817 – 17 September 1887) was an English first-class cricketer and British Army officer.

The son of the British Army General Sir John Lambert, he was born in France in September 1817. He was educated at Harrow School, where he played for the school cricket team. Following in the footsteps of his father, he joined the British Army as an ensign and lieutenant by purchase in the Grenadier Guards in July 1835. He later purchased the rank of lieutenant and captain in September 1840. Having played for Harrow at school level, Lambert played in two first-class cricket matches for the Marylebone Cricket Club in 1842, against Cambridge University and Hampshire, with both matches played at Lord's. He scored 15 runs in his two matches, with a top score of 11.

In the Grenadier Guards, he was promoted by purchase to the ranks of captain and lieutenant colonel in November 1850. Lambert sat as a mourner for the Grenadier Guards at the funeral of the Duke of Wellington in November 1852. He was promoted to major, without purchase, in February 1859, before gaining the rank of lieutenant colonel without purchase in March 1861. A colonel by 1865, he was promoted to major-general in December 1864, before being promoted to lieutenant-general in May 1873. His final promotion to general came in August 1877. He was appointed Colonel of the 89th Regiment of Foot in April 1880, serving as the regiments final Colonel before it was amalgamated with the 87th (Royal Irish Fusiliers) Regiment of Foot to form the Princess Victoria's (Royal Irish Fusiliers) in 1881. His duties as Regimental Colonel transferred to the Royal Irish Fusiliers 2nd Battalion. Lambert retired from active service in July 1881. He died at Thames Ditton in September 1887, unmarried.
