= Geoffrey Cather =

Recipient of the Victoria Cross

Geoffrey St George Shillington Cather VC
- Born: 11 October 1890; Streatham Hill, London, England
- Died: 2 July 1916 (aged 25); Beaumont-Hamel, France
- Relatives: David Graham Shillington (uncle)
- Military career
- Allegiance: United Kingdom
- Branch: British Army
- Service years: 1914–1916
- Rank: Lieutenant
- Units: 9th Battalion, The Royal Irish Fusiliers
- Conflicts: World War I: Battle of the Somme; Battle of Albert; First day on the Somme †
- Awards: Victoria Cross

Geoffrey St. George Shillington Cather VC (11 October 1890 – 2 July 1916) was a recipient of the Victoria Cross, the highest and most prestigious award for gallantry in the face of the enemy that can be awarded to British and Commonwealth forces. A soldier with the Royal Irish Fusiliers during the First World War, he was posthumously awarded the VC for his actions on 1 July 1916, during the Battle of the Somme.

== Early life ==
Cather was born in Streatham Hill, south-west London, on 11 October 1890 to Robert Gabriel "R. G." Cather, who worked for the tea merchant company Joseph Tetley & Co., and his wife Margaret Matilda née Shillington, both from Northern Ireland. His mother was the sister of the politician David Graham Shillington. He was educated at Hazelwood School in Limpsfield before going onto Rugby School. His schooling was curtailed in his mid-teens by the death of his father. He went to work for his late father's company, Joseph Tetley & Co. He spent much of the period from 1911 to 1914 in the United States and Canada on business.

== First World War ==
On 3 September 1914, Cather enlisted in the British Army's Artists Rifles. He already had some military experience, having served for two years in the Territorial Force with the 19th Royal Fusiliers from 1909 to early 1911. The following May, he requested a transfer to the Royal Irish Fusiliers on account of his parents both being from northern Ireland. He was accordingly granted a commission in the 9th Battalion, Royal Irish Fusiliers, which was part of the 36th (Ulster) Division.

Sent to the French sector of the Western Front in October 1915, Cather was soon promoted to lieutenant and became adjutant of the battalion. The following July, the 36th Division took part in the Battle of the Somme. On 1 July 1916, the opening day of the battle, Cather's battalion was tasked with capturing Beaucourt Station, near Beaumont-Hamel. However, there were heavy casualties amongst 9th Battalion and the adjacent 12th Battalion, and the Irish had to return to their starting positions leaving behind many wounded in no man's land. That night, Cather went out to locate and bring in wounded. He was able to retrieve three men before retiring for the night. The next morning he went out again to locate more survivors but was killed by machine gun fire. For his actions, he was awarded the Victoria Cross (VC). The VC, instituted in 1856, was the highest award for valour that could be bestowed on a soldier of the British Empire. The citation for his VC read as follows:

For most conspicuous bravery. From 7 p.m. till midnight he searched 'No Man's Land', and brought in three wounded men. Next morning at 8 a.m. he continued his search, brought in another wounded man, and gave water to others, arranging for their rescue later. Finally, at 10.30 a.m., he took out water to another man, and was proceeding further on when he was himself killed. All this was carried out in full view of the enemy, and under direct machine gun fire and intermittent artillery fire. He set a splendid example of courage and self sacrifice.

— The London Gazette, 9 September 1916

Originally buried near where he was killed, Cather's grave was later lost. His name is listed on the Thiepval Memorial to the Missing, which was established near Thiepval in Picardy. A plaque to his memory is on the walls of the main building of Hazelwood School, which he attended in his youth; and he is listed on the Royal Irish Fusiliers Regimental Memorial in St Anne's Cathedral in Belfast.

== Victoria Cross ==
King George V presented Cather's VC to his mother on 31 March 1917, in a ceremony at Buckingham Palace. He was also entitled to the 1914–15 Star, the British War Medal, and the Victory Medal. His VC and other medals were later donated by his brother to the Royal Irish Fusiliers Museum in Armagh, Northern Ireland.
