= Newmills =

Village in County Tyrone, Northern Ireland

Coordinates: 54.552°N 6.741°W

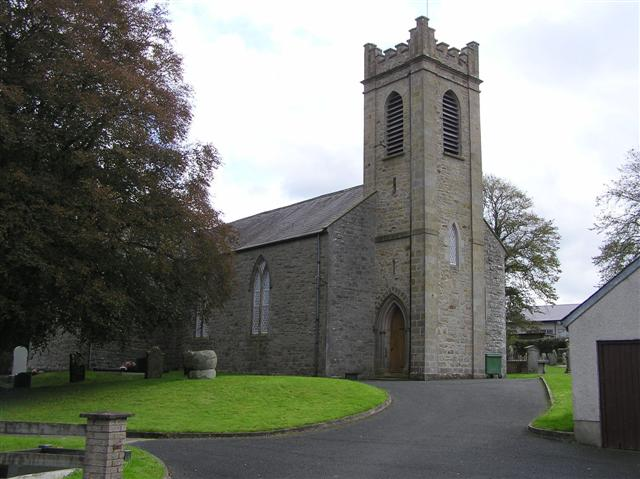
Newmills Church Of Ireland

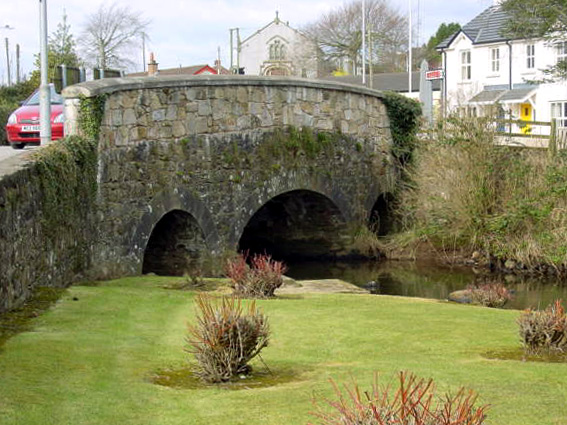
Newmills Bridge

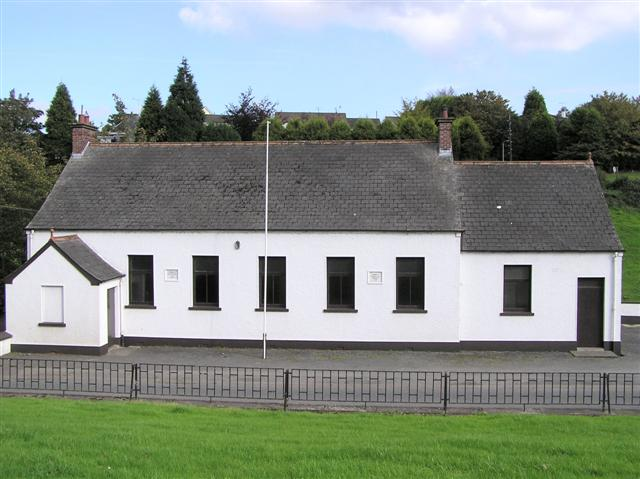
Newmills Orange Hall

Newmills is a small village in east County Tyrone, Northern Ireland, 3 miles (5 km) from Dungannon and 2 miles (3 km) from Coalisland. Newmills gets its name from a corn mill and kilns that formerly stood in the area. Local amenities include a primary school, a local shop and a number of churches. It currently has a population of approximately 400 people. The River Torrent flows through the village.

== Places of interest ==
- Annaginny Fisheries is a stocked and managed fishery.
- Roughan Castle was built in 1618 by Sir Andrew Stewart.
- Newmills Presbyterian Church.

== Politics ==
- Newmills is in the Dungannon and South Tyrone Borough Council area at the geographic centre of the Torrent ward.

== Sport ==
- Association Football is most popular local sport, and a number of teams from Newmills enter local leagues in the South Tyrone area.
- Newmills F.C. are an intermediate football club playing in the Mid-Ulster Football League.

== People ==
- Robert Morrow, received the Victoria Cross for bravery on 12 April 1915 near Messines, Belgium during World War I. He was killed in action on 26 April 1915.
- Lydia Mary Foster, novelist, writer and poet, was the daughter of Rev. James Foster, the Presbyterian Minister of Newmills from 1850 to 1890.
- Nick Griggs Irish International Athlete
