= Robert Morrow (VC) =

Recipient of the Victoria Cross

Robert Morrow VC
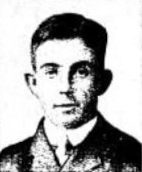
- Born: 7 September 1891; Newmills, Dungannon, County Tyrone, Ireland
- Died: 26 April 1915 (aged 23); St. Jan, Belgium
- Burial place: White House Commonwealth War Graves Commission Cemetery
- Military career
- Allegiance: (United Kingdom of Great Britain and Ireland) United Kingdom
- Branch: British Army
- Service years: 1910–1915
- Rank: Private
- Unit: Royal Irish Fusiliers
- Conflicts: World War I †
- Awards: Victoria Cross; Cross of St. George (Russia)

Robert Morrow VC (7 September 1891 – 26 April 1915) was a British soldier and Irish recipient of the Victoria Cross, the highest and most prestigious award for gallantry in the face of the enemy that can be awarded to British and Commonwealth forces.

== Details ==
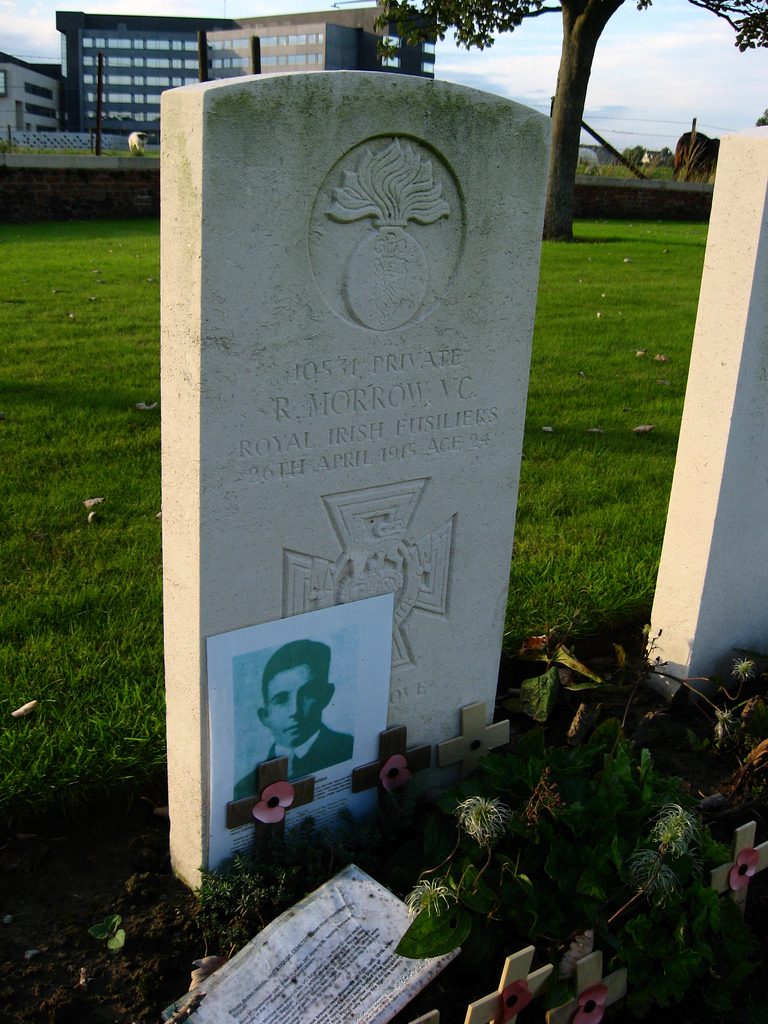
Grave in 2007

Morrow was born in Newmills, Dungannon, County Tyrone, Ireland. He enlisted in 1910. He appears on the 1911 census at St. Lucia Barracks, Bordon.

He was 23 years old, and a private in the 1st Battalion, The Princess Victoria's Royal Irish Fusiliers, British Army during the First World War when the following deed took place for which he was awarded the Victoria Cross.

On 12 April 1915 near Messines, Belgium, Private Morrow rescued and carried to places of comparative safety several men who had been buried in the debris of trenches wrecked by shell fire. He carried out this work on his own initiative and under heavy fire from the enemy.

He was died of wounds at St. Jan on the Ypres Salient, Belgium, on 26 April 1915 and is buried in White House Commonwealth War Graves Commission Cemetery. His gravestone bears the inscription: GOD IS LOVE.

His Victoria Cross is displayed at the Royal Irish Fusiliers Museum in Armagh, Northern Ireland.
