= William Edward Green =

British World War I flying ace (1898–1940)

- Born: 20 October 1898; Ipswich, Suffolk, England
- Died: 23 May 1940 (aged 41); Flanders, Belgium
- Relatives: Cicely Clare Berry (spouse)
- Military career
- Allegiance: United Kingdom
- Branch: Royal Air Force; British Army
- Rank: Lieutenant Colonel
- Nickname: "Bill"
- Units: No. 57 Squadron RAF, Northamptonshire Regiment
- Awards: Distinguished Flying Cross

Lieutenant Colonel William Edward Green DFC TD (20 October 1898 – 23 May 1940) began his military career as a World War I flying ace. He was credited with nine aerial victories while flying the Airco DH.4, making him one of the few World War I aces who were bomber pilots.

After World War I, he transferred from the Royal Air Force to the Territorial Army, serving until his death in action on 23 May 1940.

== Early life ==
William Edward Green was born in Ipswich, Suffolk, England on 20 October 1898 the son of Henry Douglas and Caroline Green. He joined the Royal Flying Corps in June 1917.

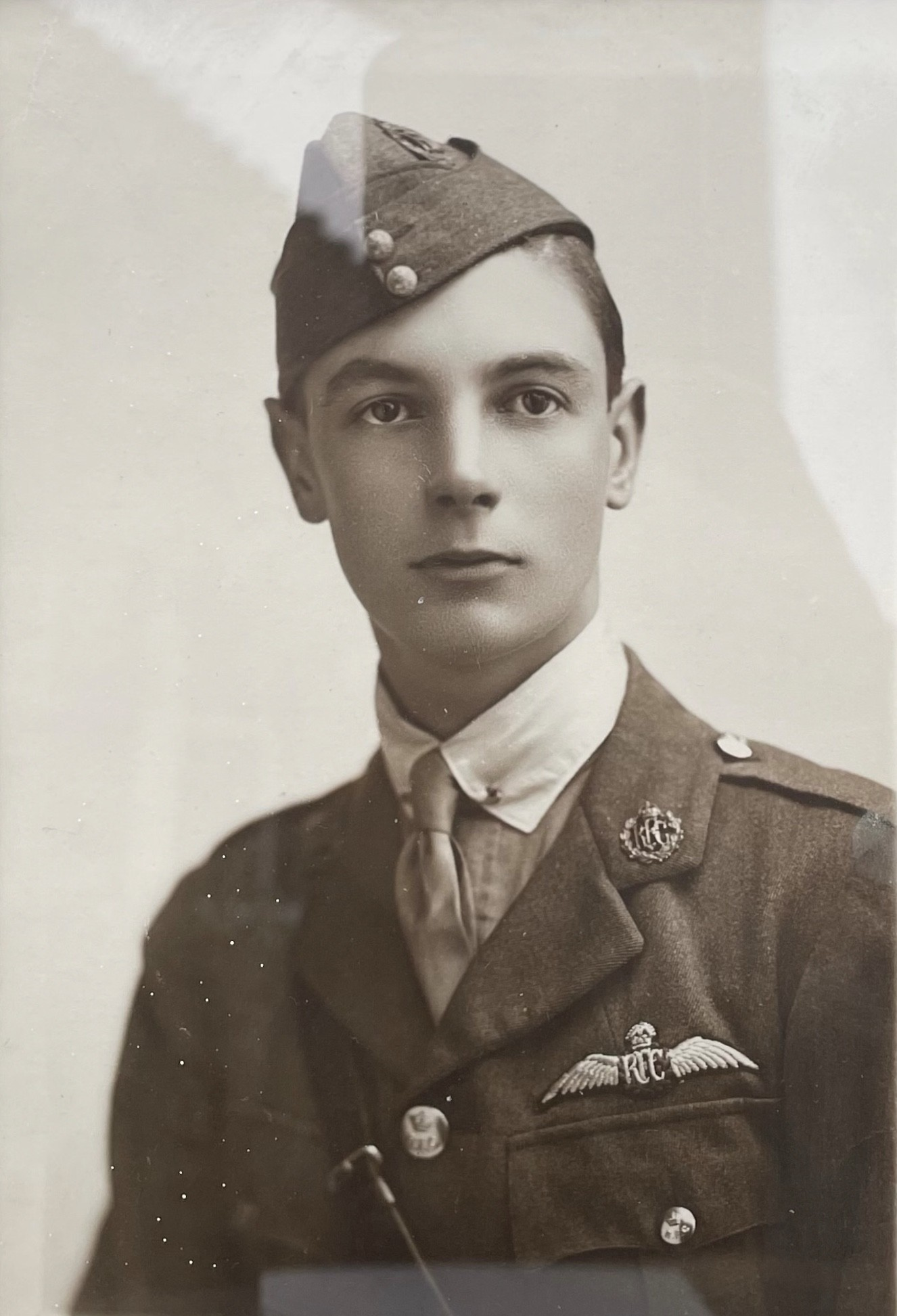
2nd Lt William Edward Green 1917. Before going to France.

== World War I ==
"Bill" Green was commissioned a second lieutenant in August 1917. He completed training and was posted to 57 Squadron on 29 September 1917. He scored his first aerial victory on 6 January 1918. On 2 July 1918, Green was promoted to temporary captain (customarily accompanied by appointment as Flight Commander).

On a bombing run that 20 July, the eve of the Second Battle of Bapaume, his flight encountered the combination of blinding rain and Pfalz D.III scouts. He afterwards wrote to Dr. Joseph Kirkland, the father of Lieut. James Tweeddale Kirkland:

... About Kirkland and Riley, what happened was this: They were on a bomb raid which I was leading. The weather was very bad, and we had been followed around by Pfalz scouts. Just as we got to the objective and had dropped our bombs, a thunder storm burst right on top of us. The rain which followed absolutely blinded every one of us, with the result that the formation got split up. I eventually collected a few of them, and having seen them across the lines, I waited for about ten or fifteen minutes, but seeing nothing I came home to find that Kirkland had not arrived. Later on we got a report through from the line that he had been seen going down over Hunland with the Huns following. Probably his engine was hit, or something like that. We are extremely sorry as he was such a topping fellow and awfully stout, and Riley no less so.

On 29 August 1918, Green scored his eighth win, only to be seriously shot about by a Fokker biplane; however, both he and his observer escaped unscathed. He scored his final win on 19 September 1918, having scored his nine victories incidental to his duties as an Airco DH.4 pilot. His Distinguished Flying Cross was gazetted after the armistice ended World War I, on 3 December 1918. The citation makes no mention of his acedom.

A skilful, courageous pilot and a brilliant leader, conspicuous for his sound judgment. No difficulties daunt him, and he has never failed to carry out any task that he may have been set. He sets a splendid example to the whole squadron.

== List of aerial victories ==
No.	Date/time	Aircraft	Foe	Result	Location	Notes
1	6 January 1918 @ 1200 hours	Airco DH.4 serial number A7904	Albatros D.V	Driven down out of control	Lichtervelde	Observer/gunner: 2 Lt E H Wilson
2	24 January 1918 @ 1130 hours	Airco DH.4 s/n A2161	Fokker Triplane	Set afire; destroyed	Northwest of Roulers	Observer/gunner: 2 Lt H S Gros
3	24 January 1918 @ 1130 hours	Airco DH.4 s/n A2161	Albatros D.V	Driven down out of control	Northwest of Roulers	Observer/gunner: 2 Lt H S Gros
4	3 February 1918 @ 1245 hours	Airco DH.4 s/n A7674	Albatros D.V	Driven down out of control	Menen	Observer/gunner: 2 Lt H S Gros
5	31 March 1918 @ 1115 hours	Airco DH.4 s/n A7904	Pfalz D.III	Driven down out of control	Bapaume	Observer/gunner: 2 Lt H S Gros
6	10 August 1918 @ 1830 hours	Airco DH.4 s/n D9262	Fokker D.VII	Driven down out of control	Between Bray and Péronne	Observer/gunner: 2 Lt C G Smith
7	10 August 1918 @ 1830 hours	Airco DH.4 s/n D9262	Fokker D.VII	Driven down out of control	Bray-Péronne	Observer/gunner: 2 Lt G C Smith
8	29 August 1918 @ 0800 hours	Airco DH.4 s/n 9262	Fokker D.VII	Driven down out of control	Ytres	Observer/gunner: Lt A M Barron MC
9	19 September 1918 @ 1725 hours	Airco DH.4 s/n D8419	Fokker D.VII	Driven down out of control	Havrincourt	Observer/gunner: Lt A M Barron MC

== Post World War I ==
On 3 February 1920 Green went on the unemployed list and surrendered his commission in the Royal Air Force upon appointment into the British Territorial Force.

On 9 April 1921, he was promoted temporary captain in 5th (Huntingdonshire) Battalion, Northamptonshire Regiment. However, shortly thereafter, on 17 July 1921, he relinquished his commission, retaining rank as captain. He obviously returned to duty, as on 10 November 1928 he was promoted to major.

On 10 November 1934, he was promoted to lieutenant colonel.

On 24 June 1938 Green was still a lieutenant colonel in the 5th Battalion, Northamptonshire Regiment. On 10 November 1938 he was promoted to colonel of battalion.

Green died on 23 May 1940 in the days before the evacuation from Dunkirk, his battalion was withdrawing across Flanders in a fighting retreat following the German advances in the Low Countries. He is buried at White House Cemetery near Ypres in Belgium. His uniform, medals and sword are held by the Norris Museum in St. Ives.

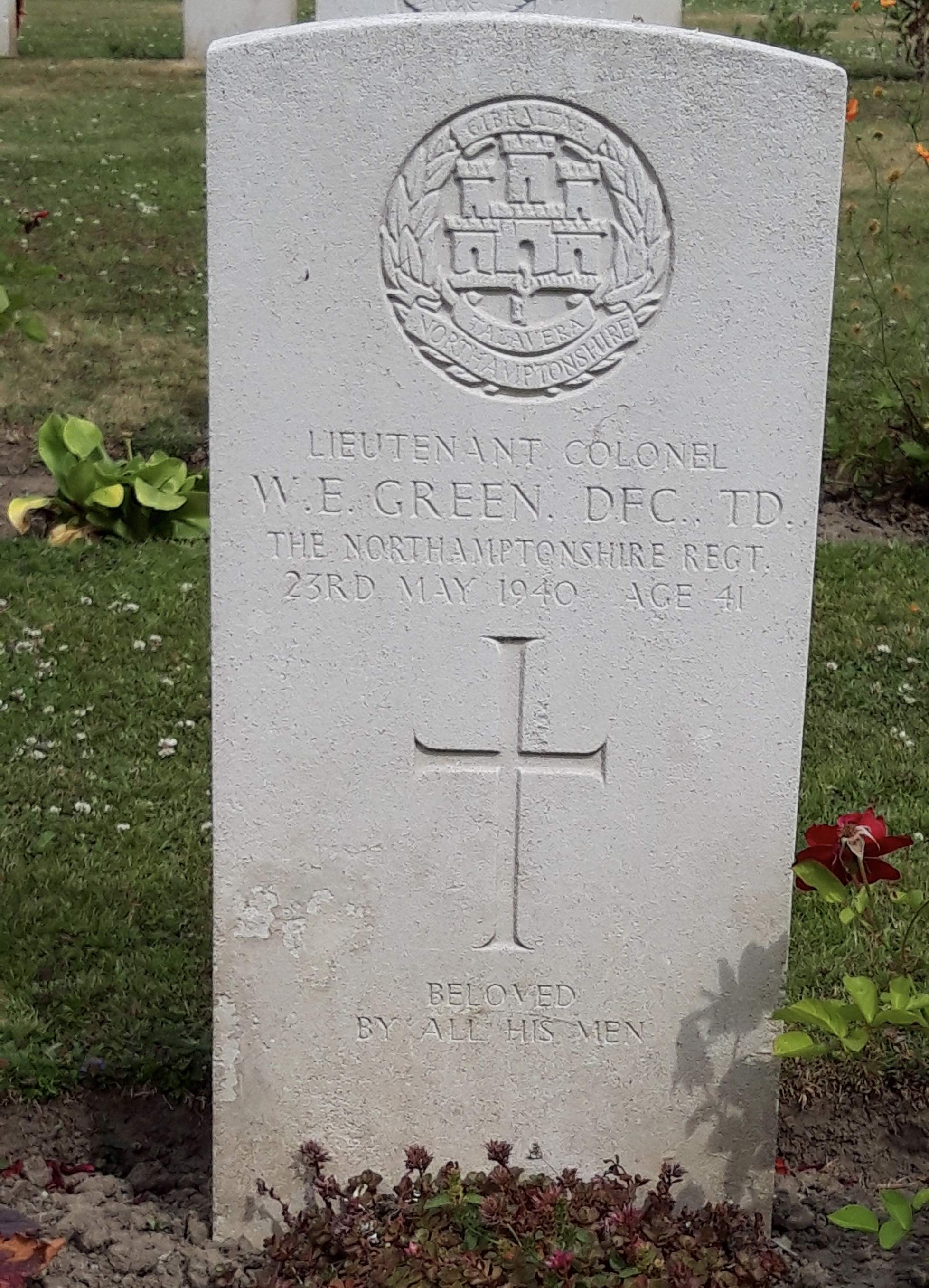
Gravestone of William Edward Green DFC
