= Lecarrow =

Lecarrow An Leithcheathrú
- Village
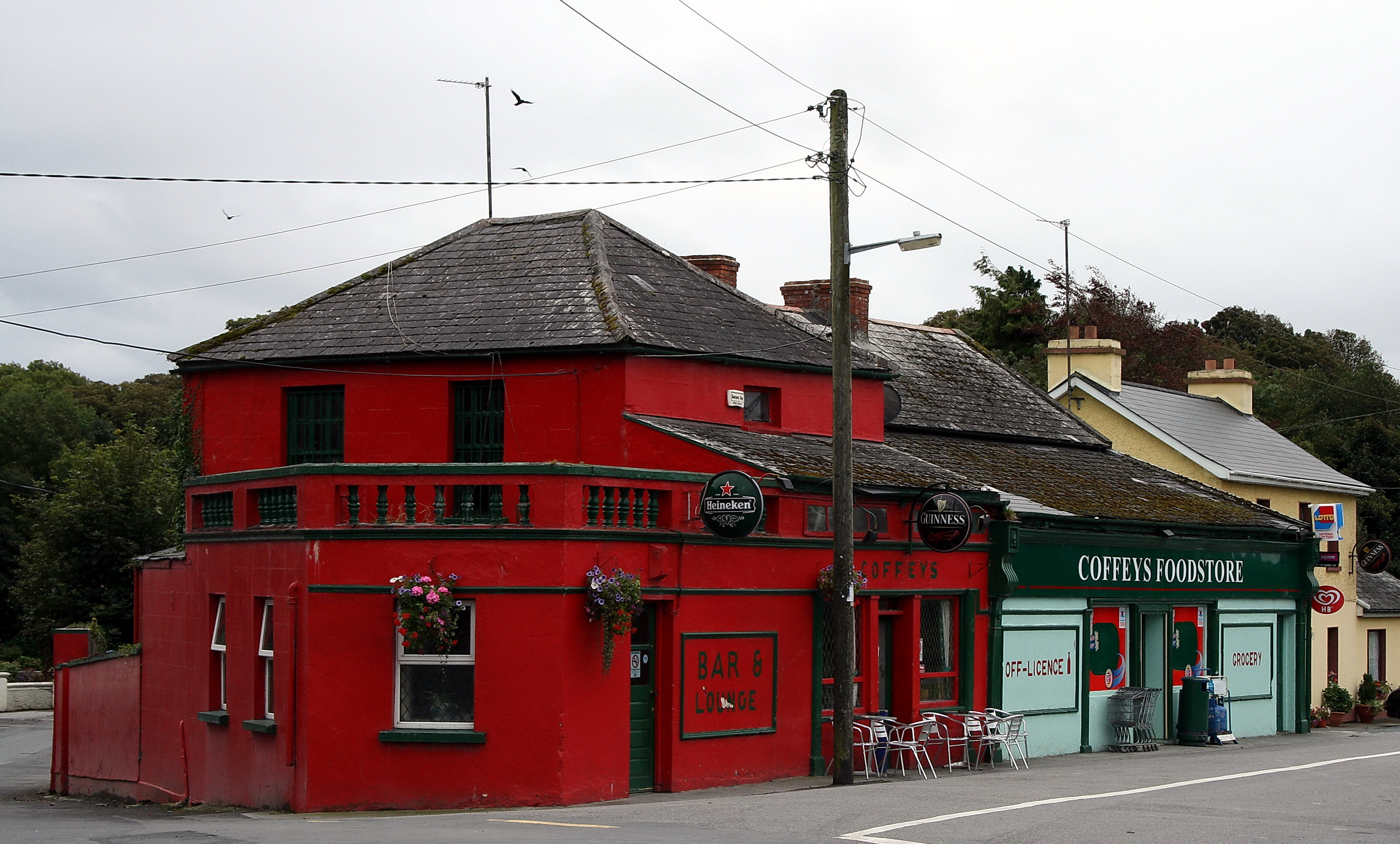

- Location in Ireland
- Coordinates: 53°33′N 8°03′W
- Country: Ireland
- Province: Connacht
- County: County Roscommon
- Elevation: 74 m (243 ft)
- Time zone: UTC+0 (WET)
  - Summer (DST): UTC-1 (IST (WEST))
- Irish Grid Reference: M967555

Lecarrow (Irish: An Leithcheathrú) is a village in County Roscommon, Ireland. Situated 17 kilometres north-west of the town of Athlone on the N61 route between Athlone and Roscommon town. A navigable canal, the Lecarrow Canal, built in 1840, connects it to Lough Ree, the second-largest lake on the River Shannon. Many of its residents commute to Athlone and Roscommon. It is the closest population centre to the Geographical centre of Ireland.

== See also ==
- List of towns and villages in Ireland
