= Coalisland Canal =

Canal in Northern Ireland

Coordinates: 54.51251°N 6.65394°W

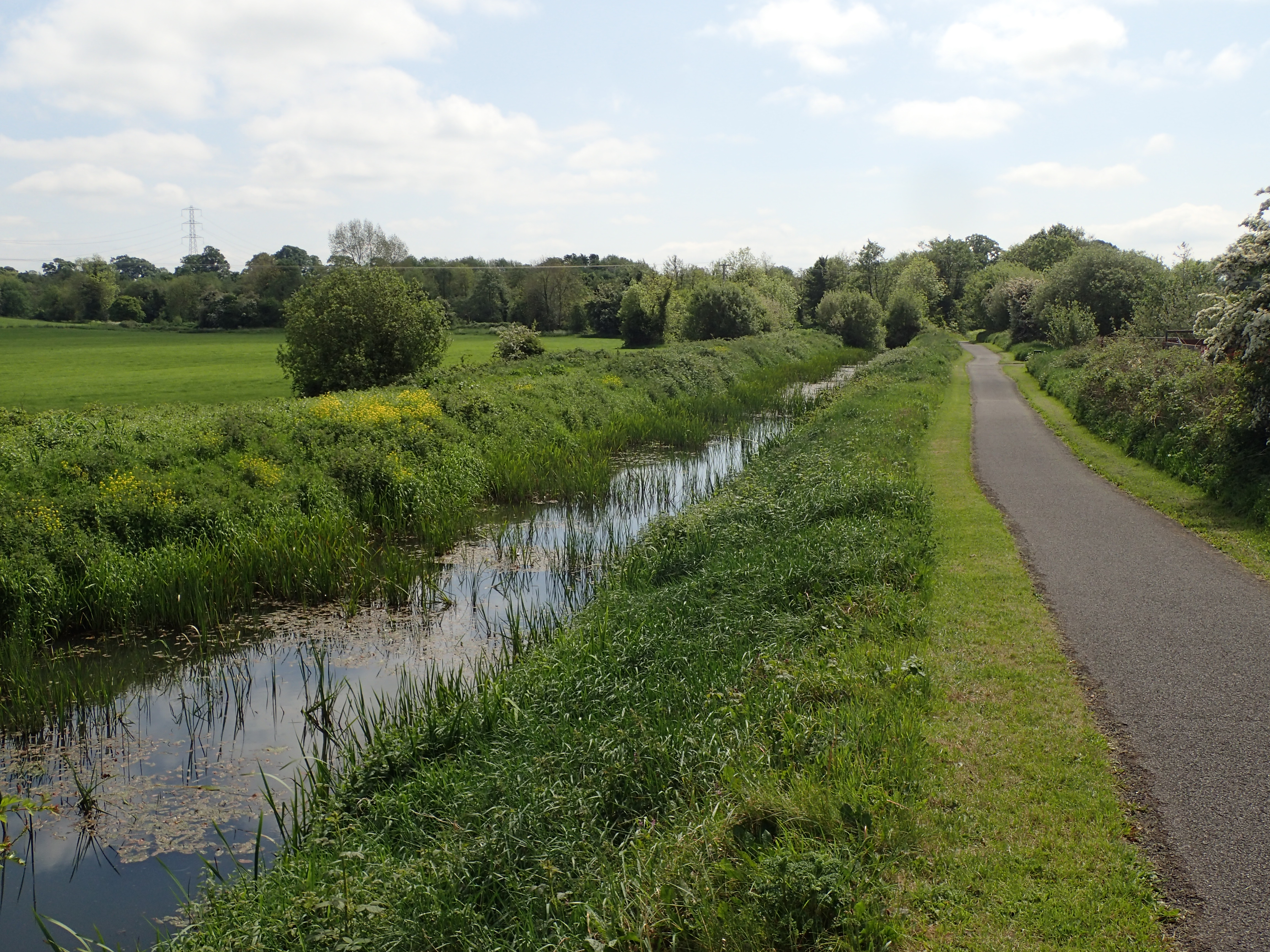

Specifications
- Length: 7.2 km (4.5 miles)
- Locks: 7
- Status: derelict

History
- Date of act: 1732
- Date completed: 1787
- Date closed: 1946

Geography
- Start point: Coalisland
- End point: River Blackwater

Coalisland Canal (sometimes known as the Tyrone Navigation) is a 7.2-kilometre-long (4.5 mi) canal in County Tyrone, Northern Ireland. Construction of the canal began in 1733, but progress was slow and it was not officially opened until 1787. The canal was built to reduce the cost of transporting coal from the Tyrone coalfields to Dublin. An extension known as "Dukart's Canal" was built to link the coalfields of Drumglass with the head of navigation at Coalisland. It opened in 1777 but was an engineering failure and closed when the main canal opened. After some difficulties with the infrastructure, traffic slowly increased, reaching its peak in 1931. Traffic then declined rapidly, and the canal was abandoned in 1954.

There has recently been some interest in restoring the remains, as most of the channel is still intact, and a group has been formed, which is now part of the Inland Waterways Association of Ireland, to raise public awareness of the canal and investigate options for the future. A small boat rally was held on the canal in April 2008.

== History ==
Coal deposits were discovered in East Tyrone at the end of the 17th century, but the coal could not be sold at Dublin, the main Irish marketplace, as the cost of its transport made it considerably more expensive than coal imported from England or Scotland. The owners of the mines were mainly based in Dublin, and the first plans to build a canal to the coalfields were made in 1709. Thomas Knox, a colliery owner, petitioned the Irish Parliament with a plan for a canal from Knock Bridge, near Gifford, to Fathom Point, near Newry. The canal broadly followed the line of the later Newry Canal, and although a parliamentary committee liked the proposal, nothing came of it at the time.

By 1727, some 60,000 to 70,000 tons of coal were being imported into Dublin, and the idea of supplying that from Irish sources gained popularity. Thomas Prior wrote to support a canal from Dungannon, near Coalisland, in 1727, while two years later, Arthur Dobbs the Surveyor-General outlined the advantages of a canal to Lough Neagh, which he thought could be built relatively easily. In the same year, Francis Seymour, who owned a colliery at Brackaville, near Coalisland, published a pamphlet in Belfast, entitled Remarks on a Scheme for supplying Dublin with Coals. While it supported Knox's scheme from 1709, it also suggested that a canal could be cut across a bog from Drumglass, where many of the pits were located, to join the River Torrent, from where the coal could be transported to the River Blackwater and onwards to Newry.

1729 also saw the establishment of the Commissioners of Inland Navigation for Ireland. They assessed a number of proposals, authorising work on the Newry Navigation in 1731 and a canal from Coalisland to the Blackwater in 1732. The canal would be around 4.5 miles (7.2 km) long, and would run broadly parallel to the River Torrent. Work began in the summer of 1733, with Acheson Johnson supervising the project. Progress was very slow, and the plan suffered from the fact that the head of navigation was still a considerable distance from the pits at Drumglass. A company was created in 1749, led by the Archbishops of Armagh and Tuam, among others, which asked the government for assistance with the construction of 3 miles (4.8 km) of roadway to link Drumglass to the canal. They were awarded a grant of £4,000 to aid the project. By this time, the pits were quite productive, and could have supplied all of Dublin's needs. It was estimated that once the road and canal were finished, the coal could be sold in Dublin for six shillings (30 pence) per ton, around one third of the cost before construction started.

There were difficulties with the construction, and progress remained slow. At Coalisland, a large basin was constructed, which was supplied by a feeder from the River Torrent. The river carried quantities of stones, clay and silt, which clogged the basin, locks and levels once the water entered the canal. Of the seven locks required, the upper two were built on sand, while the lower three were built in a peat bog. Both environments required the sinking of piles and the provision of paved floors to the lock chambers, neither of which were adequately done. The lower reaches were very close to the river, which flooded it when there was plenty of water, and drained it when there was not. While the much longer Newry Canal has only taken ten years to complete, the Coalisland Canal was still not finished, and the work was financed by £25,000, awarded from public funds between 1746 and 1782.

=== Dukart's Canal ===
It is not known whether the road from Coalisland to Drumglass was completed, but in 1760 a parliamentary committee asked Thomas Omer to survey a route from the Newry Canal to the Drumglass coalfields. Although he did so, he also suggested a canal should be constructed from Coalisland to the pits. It would be 3 miles (4.8 km) long, rising through 16 locks, and cost £15,668. His plans were approved in 1761, but the canal was to be capable of handling 100-ton boats. Oversight of the project passed from Omer to Christopher Myers in June 1762, who completed 0.5 miles (0.80 km) of the canal and part of a lock, which was 125 by 22 feet (38.1 by 6.7 m). He then reported to Parliament on the likely costs for the scheme, and recommended reducing the size to take boats which were 60 by 12 feet (18.3 by 3.7 m). £5,000 was granted towards the initial construction, but a second opinion on the engineering aspects was sought, and a French-Italian called Daviso de Arcort, also known as Davis Dukart, suggested a radical alternative, using two level sections of canal, largely in tunnel. Coal would be carried in boxes on small tub boats, and the boxes would be lowered down vertical shafts into boats on the canal below.

By November 1767, small sections of the open-air sections had been built, with part of an aqueduct over the River Torrent, at a cost of £3,839. He went back for another £14,457 to complete the scheme, but further discussion followed, the price was increased to £26,802, and the tunnels were abandoned in favour of inclined planes, called dry hurries or dry wherries locally. The inclined planes were to have had rollers fitted on the ramps, but problems were experienced, and following advice from the civil engineers William Jessop and John Smeaton in 1773, various changes were made, including counterbalancing the boats. Still the planes could not be made to work properly, and the rollers were replaced by cradles, running on conventional rails, which carried the boats. Dukart's Canal finally opened in 1777.

=== Completion ===
The Coalisland Canal dropped 51 feet (16 m) through seven locks from the Coalisland Basin to the River Blackwater, and had a depth of 5 feet (1.5 m). A towing path was provided on both sides of the channel, and it was finished in 1787. The same year saw the demise of Dukart's extension, when it was conceded that the planes were too steep to allow counterbalancing to work, and there were serious problems with water leakage on the upper section. Central control of the inland waterways was abolished in 1787, and the responsibility for the Coalisland canal was shared between the colliery owners, the Primate, the Governors and roll keepers of Tyrone. There were calls for an adequate water supply for the Drumglass to Coalisland extension, or the provision of a waggon way, in 1788, and a bill to encourage growth of the linen industry by the provision of a way to transport coal from Drumglass in 1788. The bleaching industry had to import coal from England, because they could not get it from Tyrone in 1797, and they called for a complete overhaul of the navigation.

== Operation ==
The volumes of coal transported along the canal were lower than had been predicted, hampered by the lack of a proper link from Coalisland to the collieries, but trade in flaxseed, grain, rock salt, timber, fish and coarse hardware gradually built up. However, its condition deteriorated, and by 1801, it was almost derelict. Control of inland waterways was returned to central government, and the Directors General of Inland Waterways send an engineer called Henry Walker to inspect it. He began work on repairing the canal, but was dismissed and replaced by John Brownrigg in September 1801, as similar work he had carried out on the Newry Canal was alleged to be defective. Brownrigg reported that much of the canal was dangerous, and a third opinion was sought from the engineer Daniel Monks. Between 1801 and 1812, over £20,000 was spent on the canal, which included scouring the basin at Coalisland, building wharves, stores and boundary walls around it, rebuilding of lock walls and floors, dredging the whole canal to give a depth of 4.5 feet (1.4 m), repairs to lock houses, puddling of the lower reaches where it passed through peat, and upgrading of the towpaths.

While trade in a wide variety of commodities steadily increased, coal traffic did not. Since the passing of the Act of Union in 1800, and the consequent free movement of trade between Ireland and England, Dublin had obtained all of its coal by import, which although slightly more expensive, was of much higher quality. Coalisland developed as an industrial centre, importing raw materials along the canal, and exporting tiles, bricks, earthenware, spades, shovels, sulphuric acid and sulphur, all of which were manufactured locally. Distribution of these products was however hampered by the narrower locks and shallower depth of the Ulster Canal, which connected the River Blackwater to Lough Erne.

Oversight of the canal passed to the Office of Public Works in 1831, and traffic continued to increase, from 8,200 tons in 1837 to 18,888 tons in 1866. After that date, the railways started to have a serious impact on trade, and although the canal was maintained in good order, the costs of doing so exceeded the receipts from tolls and rents. In order to avoid this situation, the government sought to find someone else to run it, and eventually sold it to the Lagan Canal Company in 1888. They increased the navigable depth to 5 feet (1.5 m), which enabled 80-ton barges to reach Coalisland, and the carriage of sand, bricks, agricultural products, pottery, fireclay goods and Irish timber to Belfast increased significantly, as did traffic in grain, coal, hardware, foreign timber and provisions in the opposite direction. Between 1890 and 1900, total traffic increased from 18,000 tons to 36,000 tons, and a loss of £89 became a profit of £355.

There were plans to increase the depth of the canal to 5.5 feet (1.7 m), to allow through working from the Lagan Navigation, but the start of the First World War in 1914 changed the economic climate, and the canal faced increasing competition from road transport once the war was over. The canal, along with the Lagan Navigation and the Ulster Canal, was under the direct control of the British Government from 1 July 1917, but shared an improvement grant of £19,000 with the Lagan Navigation when it was returned to private ownership. Despite competition, traffic in building sand, grain and coal continued to increase through the 1920s, reaching 57,000 tons in 1931, when tolls raised £1,634, and the company made a profit of £650. After that, traffic fell rapidly, with the company making less than £50 in 1939. Very little traffic used the canal during the Second World War, and all traffic ceased in 1946. In April 1954 the canal was officially abandoned and relegated to the status of a drainage ditch, when control of it passed to the Ministry of Commerce. It subsequently came under the jurisdiction of the Ministry of Finance from 1962.

== Heritage ==
The basin at Coalisland was drained in 1961, and now lies beneath the car park beside Coalisland Cornmill. The rest of the canal is owned by the local council and the Department of Agriculture. A group called the Friends of the Coalisland Canal was formed in the 1990s to raise public awareness of the canal, and to explore the potential benefits to the area of re-opening it. The group became a branch of the Inland Waterways Association of Ireland in May 2003. They held a small boats rally in April 2008, when a number of boats sailed on parts of the canal for the first time in over 50 years.

== See also ==
- Canals of Ireland
- Canals of the United Kingdom
- Coalisland.info

== Bibliography ==
- McCutcheon, W A (1965). The Canals of the North of Ireland. David and Charles. ISBN 978-0-7153-4028-8.
- "Coalisland Canal". Coalisland Canal Branch IWAI. Archived from the original on 27 January 2007.
- BBC (May 2008). "Your Place and Mine - Coalisland Canal". BBC.
- "Canals". BBC Schools.
- Dungannon and South Tyrone Area Plan 2010
