= The Troubles in Edendork =

Incidents in Edendork, Northern Ireland during the Troubles

The Troubles in Edendork recounts incidents during, and the effects of, The Troubles in Edendork, County Tyrone, Northern Ireland.

Incidents in Donaghmore during the Troubles resulting in two or more fatalities:

1974

- 7 May 1974 - James Devlin (45) and his wife, Gertrude Devlin (44), both Catholic civilians, were shot dead by the Ulster Volunteer Force as they drove into the laneway of their home at Congo, Edendork. The attack has been linked to the "Glenanne gang".
