= Lecarrow Canal =

Canal in County Roscommon, Ireland

Coordinates: 53.5498845°N 8.0436241°W

Lecarrow Canal Canáil na Leithcheathrún
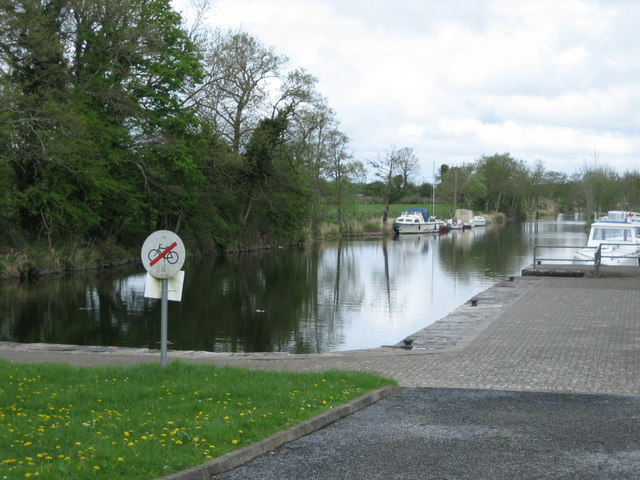
- Lecarrow harbour

Specifications
- Length: 1.5 km (0.93 miles)
- Locks: 0
- Maximum height above sea level: 73 m (240 ft)
- Status: Open

Geography
- Start point: Lecarrow
- End point: Lough Ree

The Lecarrow Canal (Irish: Canáil na Leithcheathrún) is a 1.5-kilometre (0.93 mi) navigable canal in County Roscommon, Ireland, connecting the village of Lecarrow to Lough Ree. Constructed in the 1840s to carry limestone from a quarry to Athlone for construction projects by the Shannon Commissioners, it first fell into disuse after 17 years but was cleaned up in 1889 and was dredged in the 1960s by the Office of Public Works.
