= Broharris Canal =

Canal in Ireland

Coordinates: 55.052°N 7.000°W

The Broharris Canal was a canal situated in County Londonderry, Ireland, which existed briefly in the 1820s. A planned extension to Limavady was never built.

== History ==
The Broharris canal was built in the 1820s, and ran for some 2 miles (3.2 km) southwards from Ballymacran Point on the southern shore of Lough Foyle towards Limavady. It served both as a navigation cut for boats, and as a drainage channel. The cost of construction was £4,500, and for a short time it was used to transport heavy goods, bulky foodstuffs and raw materials. It was also used to transport large quantities of kelp and shellfish harvested from the banks of the coastline to the west of Magilligan Point, which were exposed at low tide. Both products were used to fertilise the sandy soils on the flat countryside near the foot of Benevenagh.

In 1827, the inhabitants of Limavady appealed for the building of a canal from Lough Foyle to the town. John Killaly was commissioned to produce a survey, and estimated the cost of construction at £12,000. Killaly was an engineer, working for the Directors General of Inland Navigation in Dublin. His plans were for a separate canal, rather than an extension of the original Broharris Canal, which would be 3 miles 10 chains (5.0 km) long, with two locks each 60 feet (18 m) long by 13.5 feet (4.1 m) wide. One lock would be located where the canal joined Lough Foyle, and the other would be about 1 mile (1.6 km) from the terminus. Despite optimistic estimates of the volumes of traffic likely to use the waterway, plans for a horse-drawn tramway were proposed in 1832, and the canal plan was quietly dropped.

The Broharris Canal did not last for long, but there is no positive mention of its demise. The Irish Railway Commissioners produced a report on the inland waterways in 1838, in which the canal was not mentioned, although it was briefly noted in some government reports dating to the second half of the 19th century. A Royal Commission on the waterways also failed to mention it.

== See also ==
- Canals of Ireland
- Canals of the United Kingdom

== Bibliography ==
- Cumberlidge, Jane (2002). The Inland Waterways of Ireland. Imray Laurie Norie and Wilson. ISBN 978-0-85288-424-9.
- Delany, Ruth (2004). Ireland's Inland Waterways. Appletree Press. ISBN 978-0-86281-824-1.
- McCutcheon, W A (1965). The Canals of the North of Ireland. David and Charles.
