= Kilkenny Canal =

Unfinished canal in Ireland

The Kilkenny Canal is a short stretch of unfinished canal in southeast Ireland which was originally intended to make the River Nore navigable as far as Kilkenny City. Funding for the canal was provided by the Parliament of Ireland in 1755, to the value of £10,000. Work was abandoned in 1761, and no barges ever completed the journey from the navigable section of the Nore to Kilkenny. It is recognised in the National Inventory of Architectural Heritage.
