= Coalisland =

Town in County Tyrone, Northern Ireland

Coordinates: 54.542°N 6.694°W

Coalisland: Irish: Oileán an Ghuail; Scots: Collislann
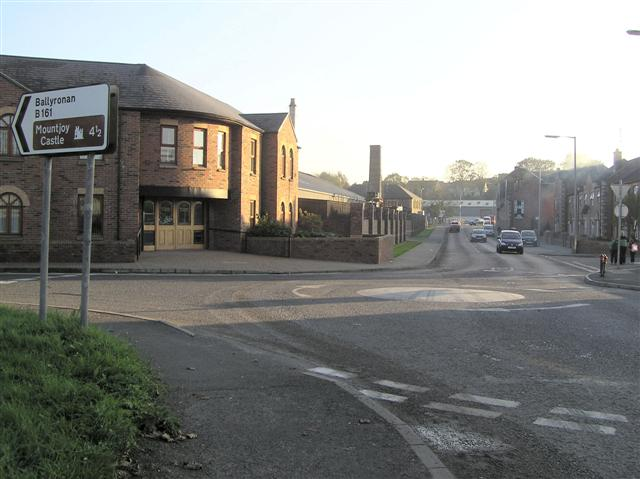
- View from the north of the town

- Location within Northern Ireland
- Population: 6,323 (2021 census)
  - Belfast: 35 miles (56 km)
- District: Mid Ulster
- County: County Tyrone
- Country: Northern Ireland
- Sovereign state: United Kingdom
- Post town: DUNGANNON
- Postcode district: BT71
- Dialling code: 028
- UK Parliament: Mid Ulster
- NI Assembly: Mid Ulster

Coalisland is a small town in County Tyrone, Northern Ireland, with a population of 6,323 in the 2021 census. The town is 4 miles from Lough Neagh, it was formerly a centre for coal mining.

== History ==
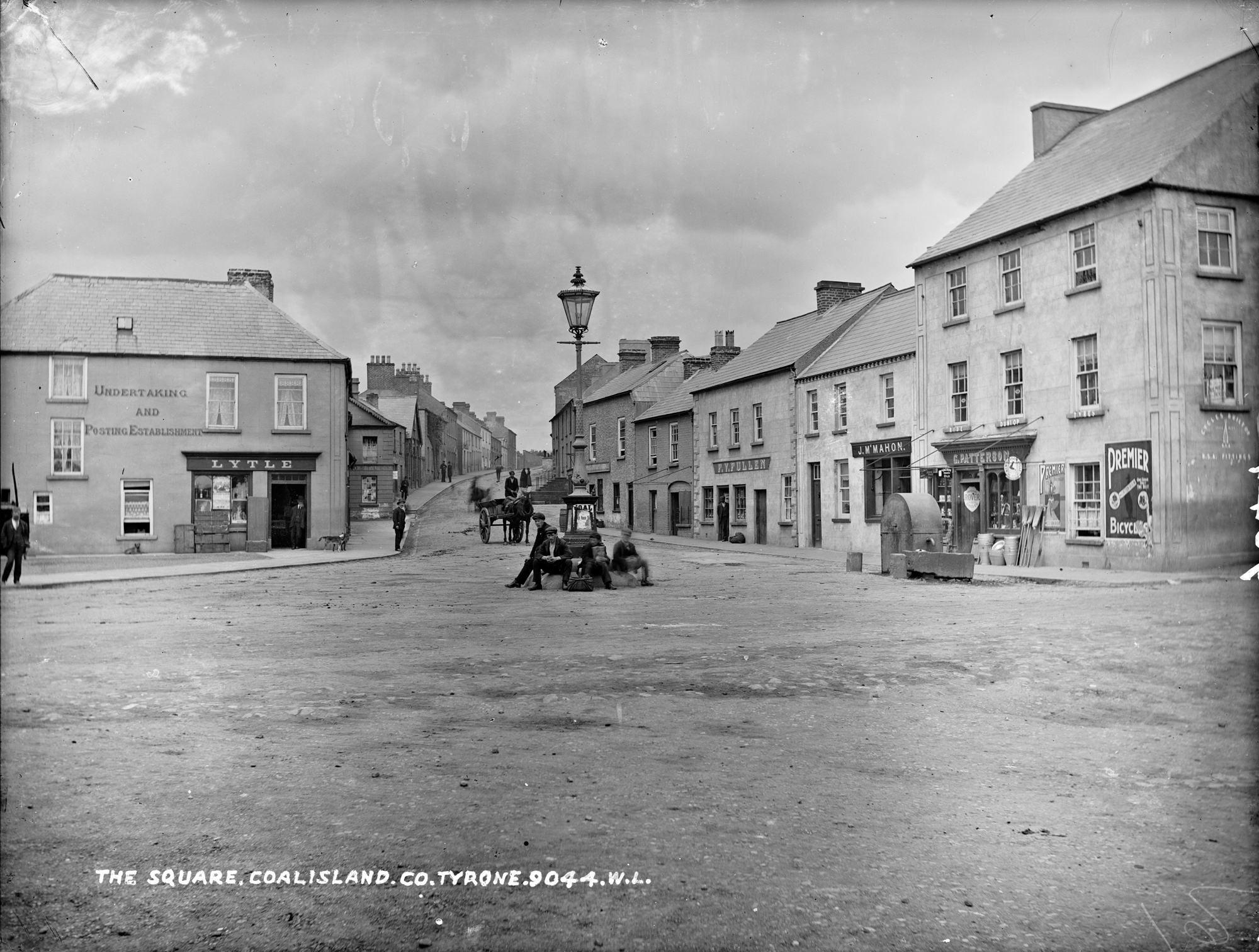
Coalisland in the early 1900s

=== Coal industry origins ===
In the late 17th century, coal deposits were discovered in East Tyrone. While it was possible to exploit these resources, the difficulty was in getting the coal to market in Dublin. In 1744 work began on the Coalisland Canal linking the coalfields to Lough Neagh. The town grew up around the canal workings.

Mining of coal at Coalisland came to an end in 1970.

=== Twentieth century ===
On 24 August 1968, the Campaign for Social Justice (CSJ), the Northern Ireland Civil Rights Association (NICRA), among others, held the first civil rights march in Northern Ireland. The march went from Coalisland to Dungannon.

=== The Troubles ===
The town has traditionally been viewed as an IRA stronghold throughout the twentieth century, with deep and enduring links to republicanism in the vicinity. From 1969 to 2001, a total of 20 people were shot in or near Coalisland during the Troubles. The British Army killed a total of eight people, seven of whom were Provisional Irish Republican Army members and one a Catholic civilian; the IRA killed five British soldiers, three Royal Ulster Constabulary policemen, one ex-Ulster Defence Regiment soldier, and two Catholic civilians, all in separate incidents. The Ulster Volunteer Force was responsible for the murder of a Catholic civilian in the nearby townland of Aughamullan.

== Transport ==
The town was served by a canal (the Coalisland Canal or Tyrone Navigation), although this is now derelict. Coalisland railway station was opened on 28 July 1897, closed for passenger traffic on 16 January 1956 and for goods traffic on 5 October 1959, finally closing altogether on 1 April 1965. There are no remains of the railway other than the bridge on the Derry Road, an old goods shed, and grown-over platforms.

Daily bus services operated by Ulsterbus go through the town.

== Arts and culture ==
The Craic Theatre and Arts Centre is a performing arts venue built on the site of an old weaving factory. Each year it provides opportunities and entertainment for people of the area, through its in-house company Craic Players. It has a youth theatre programme for children and young people aged 4–18. It also offers professional touring companies the opportunity to stage shows, concerts and workshops.

== Education ==
Primary schools in the area include Gaelscoil Uí Néill, Primate Dixon Primary School and St John's Primary School.

St Joseph's College is a Catholic secondary school in the town.

== Sport ==
Coalisland Na Fianna, the local Gaelic Athletic Association club, was founded in 1903.

== Demography ==
=== 19th century population ===
The population of the village increased during the 19th century:

Year	1841	1851	1861	1871	1881	1891
Population	451	627	661	598	677	785
Houses	103	120	143	135	159	191

=== Census 2011 ===
On census day 2011 (27 March 2011), there were 5,682 people living in Coalisland. Of these:

- 25.5% were aged under 16 years and 10.0% were aged 65 and over
- 49.1% of the population were male and 50.9% were female
- 93.8% were from a Catholic background and 4.7% were from a Protestant or other Christian background
- 7.2% of people aged 16–74 were unemployed.

== People ==
- Denis Haughey (born 1944) – politician, founding member of SDLP
- Dennis Taylor (born 1949) – 1985 Snooker World Champion
- Michelle O'Neill (born 1977) – Sinn Féin politician and First Minister of Northern Ireland
- Nathan Rafferty (born 2000) – Professional PDC darts player
- Michael "Mickey" Mansell (born 1973) Professional PDC darts player
- The Lynn brothers, were four siblings who served in the British Army and died on active service between 1915 and 1920. Their names are commemorated on a marble plaque in the local Church of Ireland.

== See also ==
- List of localities in Northern Ireland by population
