= Royal Irish Fusiliers =

Former regiment of the British Army

Princess Victoria's (Royal Irish Fusiliers) Royal Irish Fusiliers (Princess Victoria's)
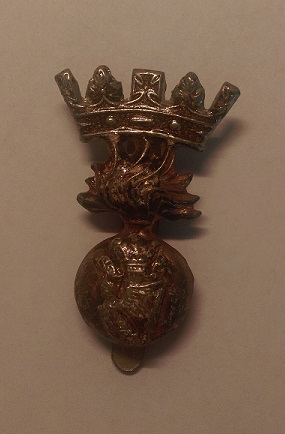
- Royal Irish Fusiliers Cap Badge
- Active: 1881–1968
- Country: United Kingdom
- Branch: British Army
- Type: Light infantry Line infantry (originally)
- Size: 1–2 Regular battalions Up to 3 Militia and Special Reserve battalions 1–2 Territorial and Volunteer battalions Up to 10 Hostilities-only battalions
- Garrison/HQ: Gough Barracks, Armagh
- Nicknames: The Old Fogs, The Rollickers
- Motto: Faugh-a-Ballagh (Clear the way)
- March: Quick: St Patrick's Day; Garry Owen; Barrosa

Insignia
- Hackle: Emerald Green

The Royal Irish Fusiliers (Princess Victoria's) was an Irish line infantry (later changed to light infantry) regiment of the British Army, formed by the amalgamation of the 87th (Prince of Wales's Irish) Regiment of Foot and the 89th (Princess Victoria's) Regiment of Foot in 1881. The regiment's first title in 1881 was Princess Victoria's (Royal Irish Fusiliers), changed in 1920 to the Royal Irish Fusiliers (Princess Victoria's). Between the time of its formation and Irish independence, it was one of eight Irish regiments.

In 1968, the Royal Irish Fusiliers (Princess Victoria's) was amalgamated with the other regiments of the North Irish Brigade, the Royal Inniskilling Fusiliers and the Royal Ulster Rifles, to become the Royal Irish Rangers.

== History ==
=== Early history ===
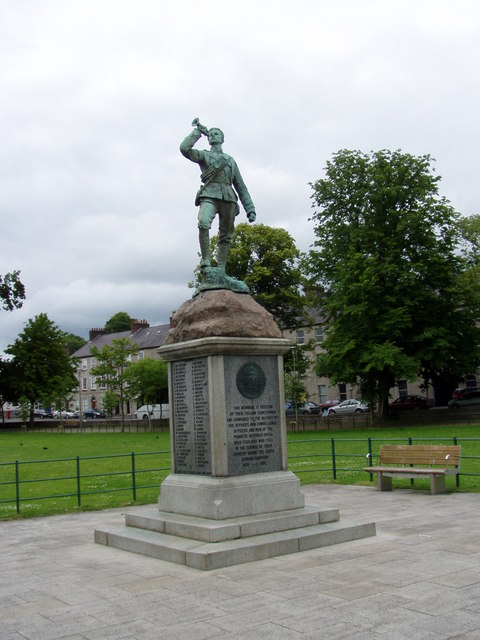
Memorial in Armagh to the men of the Royal Irish Fusiliers who died in the Second Boer War

The regiment was formed in 1881 as part of the Childers Reforms by the amalgamation of the 87th (Prince of Wales's Irish) Regiment of Foot and the 89th (The Princess Victoria's) Regiment of Foot. The regiment got its nickname, the Faughs, from its Irish war cry "Faugh A Ballagh" (Fág a' Bealach, meaning Clear the Way) from the Napoleonic Wars. Regimental distinctions included a green plume worn on the left side of the headdress and an Irish harp as part of the badge. It was the county regiment for Armagh, Monaghan and Cavan, with its depot at Gough Barracks in Armagh. Militarily, the whole of Ireland was administered as a separate command within the United Kingdom with Command Headquarters at Parkgate, (Phoenix Park) Dublin, directly under the War Office in London.

The 1st Battalion saw action in the Anglo-Egyptian War in 1882.

Both battalions served in South Africa during the Second Boer War (1899–1902). The 1st battalion was present at the Battle of Talana Hill in October 1899 and the various engagements leading to the Relief of Ladysmith. Meanwhile, the 2nd Battalion saw action at the Battle of the Tugela Heights in February 1900. The 2nd Battalion was commanded by Colonel Richard S. H. Moody from January 1901 until the campaign ended in June 1902, when some of it returned to England on the SS Custodian, which landed at Southampton in August 1902. About 500 officers and men of the 1st battalion returned home on the SS Pinemore in October 1902, after the war had ended three months earlier. The 2nd Battalion left South Africa for British India early the following year, and was stationed at Rawalpindi.

In 1908, the Volunteers and Militia were reorganised nationally, with the former becoming the Territorial Force and the latter the Special Reserve; the regiment now had two Reserve but no Territorial battalions.

=== The First World War ===
==== Regular Army ====
The 1st Battalion landed at Boulogne-sur-Mer as part of the 10th Brigade in the 4th Division in August 1914 for service on the Western Front and suffered heavy losses at the Battle of Le Cateau in August 1914. The 2nd Battalion landed at Le Havre as part of the 82nd Brigade in the 27th Division in December 1914 for service on the Western Front, but moved to Salonika in December 1915 for service on the Macedonian front before moving on to Egypt for service in Palestine in September 1917. In response to the outbreak of World War One, the 7th Battalion was raised, for the first time, and subsequently commanded, by Colonel Richard S. H. Moody.

The 3rd (reserve) Battalion fought in operations to end the Easter Rising in Dublin in 1916. Two of the Royal Irish Fusiliers were killed and six more wounded.

==== New Armies ====
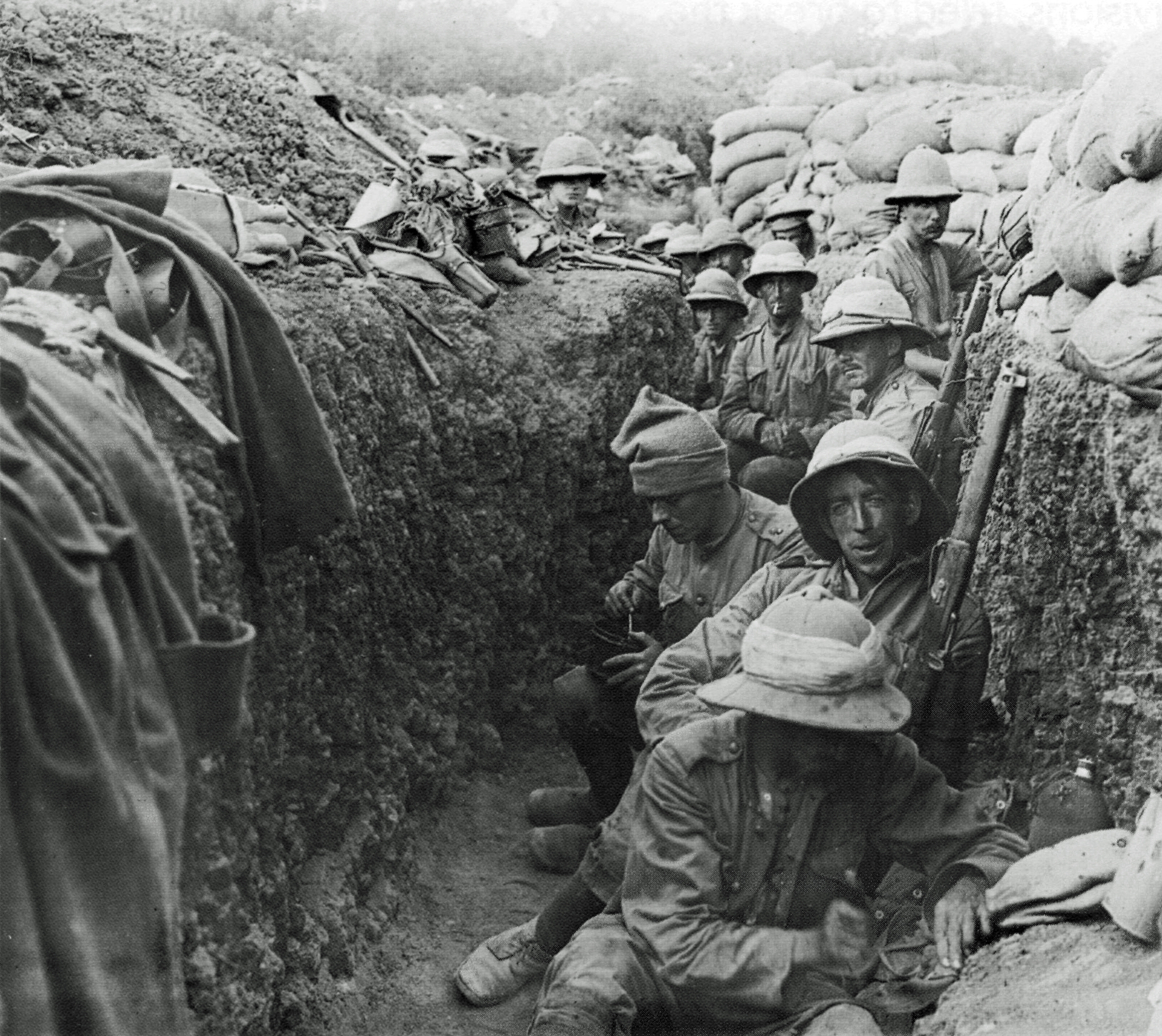
Troops from the 5th (Service) Battalion, Royal Irish Fusiliers, serving in Gallipoli in the autumn of 1915.

The 5th (Service) Battalion and the 6th (Service) Battalion landed at Suvla Bay in Gallipoli as part of the 31st Brigade in the 10th (Irish) Division in August 1915 but moved to Salonika in October 1915 for service on the Macedonian Front.

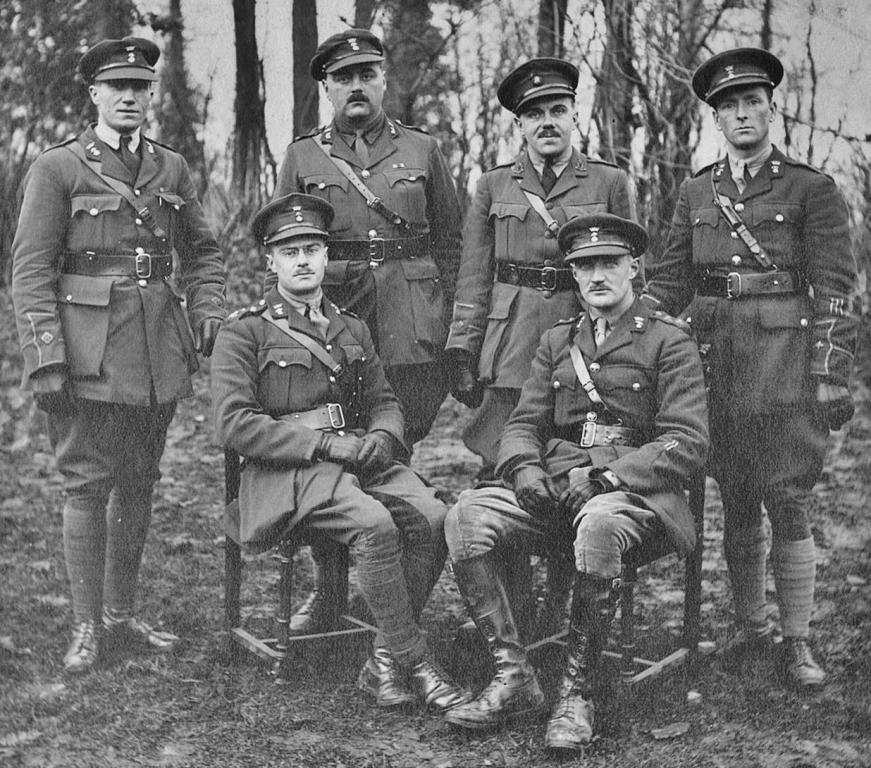
Officers of C Company, 9th (Service) Battalion, Royal Irish Fusiliers, at Mouscron, Belgium, November 1918.

The 7th (Service) Battalion, commanded by Lieutenant-Colonel Frederic Thornton Trevor Moore, and 8th (Service) Battalion, commanded by Colonel John Southwell Brown, landed in France as part of the 49th Brigade in the 16th (Irish) Division in February 1916 for service on the Western Front.

The 9th (Service) Battalion (County Armagh) landed at Boulogne-sur-Mer as part of the 108th Brigade in the 36th (Ulster) Division in October 1915 for service on the Western Front.

=== Inter-War ===
With the independence of the Irish Free State in 1922, all the Irish line infantry regiments of the British army regiments were to be disbanded. However, this decision was later amended to exclude four battalions. After a successful campaign by the Royal Irish Fusiliers (Princess Victoria's), it was agreed that the disbandment would not be of the most junior regiment, but of the two most junior battalions. These were the 2nd Battalion, Royal Irish Fusiliers, the old 89th Foot, and the 2nd Battalion, Royal Inniskilling Fusiliers, the old 108th Foot. The 2nd battalion was re-raised in 1938.

=== The Second World War ===
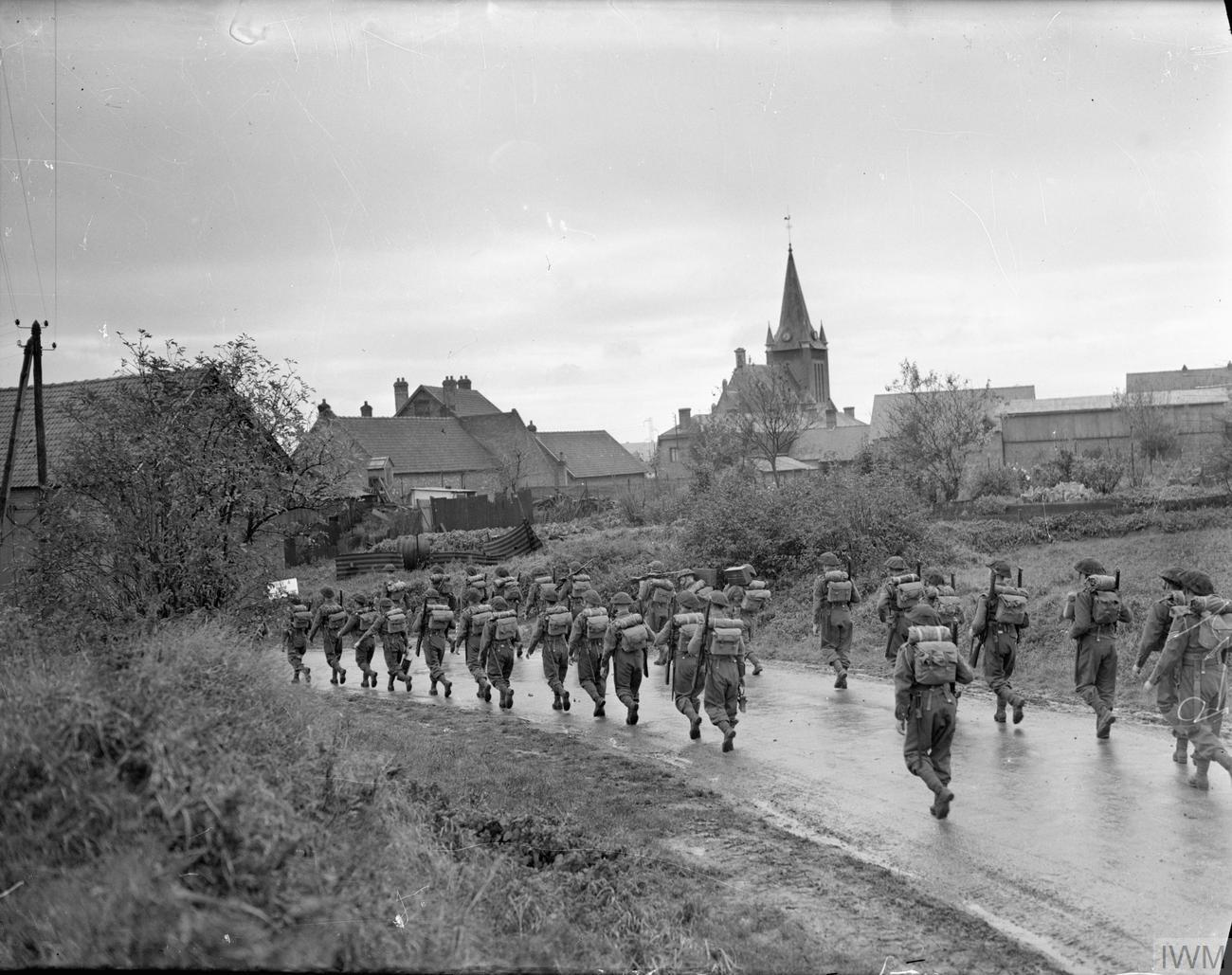
The Royal Irish Fusiliers in France, October 1939

The 1st Battalion, which had originally been serving with 25th Infantry Brigade in the 50th Division, was sent to France in early 1940 to join the rest of the British Expeditionary Force. The battalion fought in the Battle of Dunkirk and was forced to be evacuated. After Dunkirk, the battalion became part of the 210th Independent Infantry Brigade (Home), which was later renumbered the 38th (Irish) Brigade. The brigade was initially attached to the 6th Armoured Division and served with them during the start of the Tunisian Campaign until 2 February 1943, when it was exchanged with the 1st Guards Brigade of the 78th Battleaxe Division. The battalion would remain with the division for the rest of the war, serving in the fighting in Sicily, where the Irish Brigade fought, with great success, in the Battle of Centuripe in August 1943. The success in Sicily was followed by the landings in the Italian mainland. During its service in Italy, the battalion took part in many river crossings and battles with perhaps the most famous being the Battle of Monte Cassino, one of the hardest-fought battles of the entire campaign and saw their final battle in Operation Grapeshot.

The 2nd Battalion, formerly the 89th Regiment of Foot, served throughout the Siege of Malta from 1940 to 1943, with the 4th (Malta) Infantry Brigade, later renumbered the 234th Infantry Brigade. The battalion was lost in the Battle of Leros in September 1943 and the Battle of Kos in October 1943 and had to be reformed later.

=== Post-war ===
The 1st and 2nd battalions were amalgamated as the 1st Battalion in September 1948. The regiment was deployed to Jordan in June 1949 and to Gibraltar in December 1949, before arriving at Border Barracks in Göttingen in November 1950. It moved to Brooke Barracks in Berlin in June 1953 and then returned to the UK in June 1964. The regiment was deployed to Korea in July 1954 and to Kenya in January 1955 in response to the Mau Mau Uprising. It went to Harding Barracks in Wuppertal in June 1956 and deployed to Libya in August 1958 before moving to Trenchard Barracks in Celle in October 1961. It was sent on peacekeeping duties to Cyprus in June 1964 before returning home in September 1965. It deployed to Swaziland in April 1966 and to Aden in December 1966. In July 1968, the Royal Irish Fusiliers (Princess Victoria's) was amalgamated with the other regiments of the North Irish Brigade, the Royal Inniskilling Fusiliers and the Royal Ulster Rifles to become the Royal Irish Rangers.

== Regimental museum ==
The Royal Irish Fusiliers Museum is located on the Mall in Armagh, County Armagh, Northern Ireland. The exhibits include uniforms, medals, regalia and the two Victoria Crosses won by the regiment.

== Battle honours ==
The regiment was awarded the following battle honours. Those shown in bold from the two World Wars were those selected to be emblazoned on the Kings's Colour:

- From 87th Regiment of Foot: Monte Video, Talavera, Barrosa, Tarifa, Vittoria, Nivelle, Orthes, Toulouse, Peninsula, Ava
- From 89th Regiment of Foot: Egypt, Java, Niagara, Ava, Sevastopol
- Tel-el-Kebir, Egypt 1882 '84, Relief of Ladysmith, South Africa 1899-1902
- The Great War (14 battalions): **Le Cateau**, Retreat from Mons, **Marne 1914**, Aisne 1914, Armentières 1914, Hill 60, **Ypres 1915 '17 '18**, Gravenstafel, St. Julien, Frezenberg, Bellewaarde, **Somme 1916 '18**, Albert 1916, Guillemont, Ginchy, Le Transloy, **Arras 1917**, Scarpe 1917, **Messines 1917 '18**, Langemarck 1917, Cambrai 1917, St. Quentin, Rosières, **Lys**, Bailleul, Kemmel, Courtrai, France and Flanders 1914–18, Kosturino, Struma, **Macedonia 1915-17**, **Suvla**, Landing at Suvla, Scimitar Hill, Gallipoli 1915, Gaza, Jerusalem, Tell 'Asur, Megiddo, Nablus, **Palestine 1917-18**
- The Second World War: Withdrawal to Escaut, **St Omer-La Bassée**, **Bou Arada**, Stuka Farm, **Oued Zarga**, Djebel bel Mahdi, Djebel Ang, **Djebel Tanngoucha**, Adrano, **Centuripe**, Salso Crossing, Simeto Crossing, Malleto, **Termoli**, Trigno, **Sangro**, Fossacesia, **Cassino II**, Liri Valley, Trasimene Line, Monte Spaduro, Monte Grande, **Argenta Gap**, San Nicolo Canal, Leros, **Malta 1940**

== Victoria Cross ==
Recipients of the Victoria Cross:

- Private Robert Morrow 1st Bn Royal Irish Fusiliers. 1915. Messines.
- Lieutenant Geoffrey Cather 9th Bn Royal Irish Fusiliers. 1916. Hamel, Somme.

== Regimental Colonels ==
Colonels of the Regiment were:

The Princess Victoria's (Royal Irish Fusiliers)

- 1881–1883: (1st Battalion) Gen. Sir Charles Hastings Doyle (ex 87th (Royal Irish Fusiliers) Regiment of Foot)
- 1881–1887: (2nd Battalion only to 1883) Gen. John Arthur Lambert
- 1887–1897: Gen. Augustus Halifax Ferryman
- 1897: Gen. Thomas Casey Lyons
- 1897–1899: Lt-Gen. Sir Alexander Hugh Cobbe
- 1899–1923: Maj-Gen. Thomas Rennie Stevenson

The Royal Irish Fusiliers (Princess Victoria's) (1921)

- 1923–1937: Lt-Gen. Sir Thomas Edwin Scott
- 1937–1946: Brig-Gen. Adrian Beare Incledon-Webber
- 1946–1954: F.M. Sir Gerald Walter Robert Templer, KG, GCB, GCMG, KBE, DSO
- 1960–1968: Maj-Gen. Thomas Patrick David Scott, CB, CBE, DSO

*1968 Regiment amalgamated with The Royal Inniskilling Fusiliers and The Royal Ulster Rifles to form The Royal Irish Rangers

== Great War Memorials ==
- Irish National War Memorial Gardens, Dublin.
- Ulster Tower Memorial Thiepval, France.
- Island of Ireland Peace Park Messines, Belgium.
- Menin Gate Memorial Ypres, Belgium.
- Helles Memorial Cape Helles, Gallipoli Peninsula, Turkey

== Sources ==
- Corbally, M J P M (1979). Outline History of The Royal Irish Rangers (27th (inniskilling), 83rd and 87th). Armagh: Royal Irish Rangers.
- Doherty, Richard (1993). Irish generals: Irish generals in the British Army in the Second World War. Appletree press. ISBN 9780862813956. "centuripe irish brigade."
- Harris, Major Henry E. D. (1968). The Irish Regiments in the First World War. Mercer Press Cork. ISBN 978-0853420729.
- Joslen, H. F. (2003) [1960]. Orders of Battle: Second World War, 1939–1945. Uckfield, East Sussex: Naval and Military Press. ISBN 978-1-84342-474-1.
