= Custom House =

Custom House or Customs House may refer to:

== Buildings ==
- Custom house, a building housing the offices that process the tariffs associated with importing and exporting goods

=== Australia ===
- Customs House, Brisbane, Queensland
- Customs House, Maryborough, Queensland
- Customs House, Melbourne, Victoria
- Customs House, Rockhampton, Queensland
- Customs House, Sydney, New South Wales
- Fremantle Customs House, Western Australia
- Newcastle Customs House, New South Wales

=== Canada ===
- Custom House, Montreal, Canada

=== China ===
- Customs House, Shanghai

=== Ireland ===
- Custom House, Cork
- Custom House, Belfast
- Custom House, Dublin
- The Old Custom House, Dublin
- Custom House, Limerick (now the Hunt Museum)

=== Myanmar (Burma) ===
- Customs House, Yangon

=== Norway ===
- Customs House, Porsgrunn
- Tollerodden, Larvik

=== Thailand ===
- Customs House, Bangkok

=== United Kingdom ===
- Custom House, Barrow-in-Furness, England
- Custom House, Belfast, Northern Ireland
- Custom House, Exeter, England
- Custom House, Lancaster, England
- Custom House, Liverpool, England
- Custom House, City of London
- Custom House, Newham, London, England
  - Custom House (ward)
- Customs House, Newcastle upon Tyne, England
- Custom House, Poole, England
- Customs House, South Shields, Tyneside, England
- Custom House, Weymouth, England
- Custom House station, a station serving the DLR and Elizabeth line

=== United States ===
- Old Custom House (Monterey, California)
- United States Customs House (Chicago)
- Boston Custom House, Boston, Massachusetts
- Custom House (Salem, Massachusetts)
- United States Custom House (New York City)
- Alexander Hamilton U.S. Custom House, New York City
- Custom House (Sag Harbor, New York)
- Customs House (Sodus Point, New York)
- United States Customhouse (Portland, Oregon)
- Customs House (Nashville, Tennessee)

== Other uses ==
- Custom House Stadium, a name for West Ham Stadium
- "The Custom-House", Nathaniel Hawthorne's introductory essay to The Scarlet Letter
- Custom House, an imprint of William Morrow and Company

== See also ==
- Customs broking
- Customs House Hotel (disambiguation)
- Old Customhouse (disambiguation)
- Customs house agent, type of licensed agent in India
