= The Custom House, Cork =

Municipal building in Cork, Ireland

Custom House
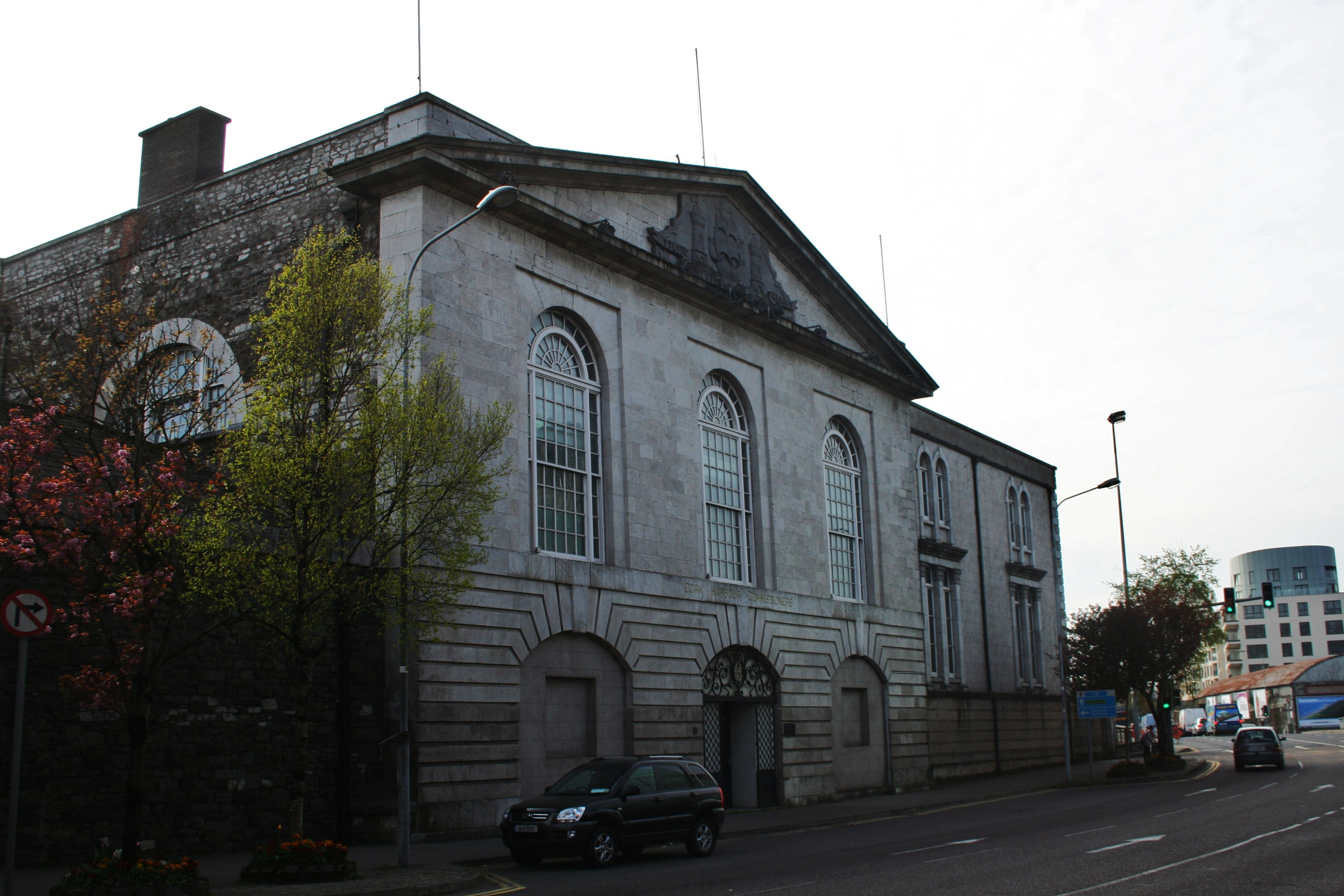
- Front façade on Custom House Street

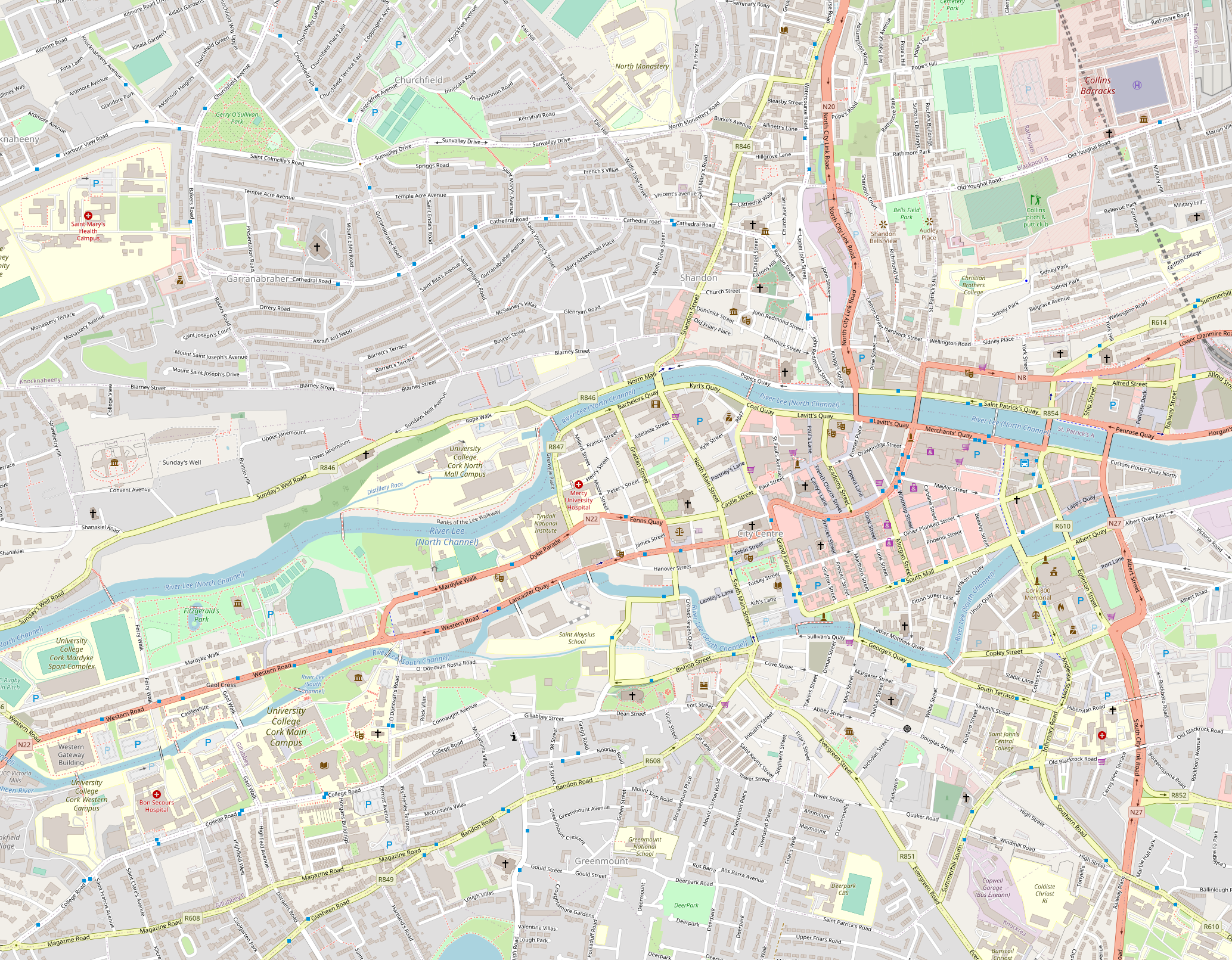
- Location within Cork Central
- Alternative names: New Custom House, Customs House Harbour Commissioner's Offices

General information
- Type: Custom house
- Architectural style: Palladian and Neoclassical
- Classification: Protected structure
- Location: Custom House Quay, Cork, Ireland
- Coordinates: 51°53′57″N 8°27′48″W
- Construction started: 1814
- Opened: 1818
- Renovated: 1906

Technical details
- Floor count: 2
- Grounds: 2 acres (0.81 ha)

Design and construction
- Architect: Abraham Addison Hargrave (d.1838)

The Custom House is an early 19th-century building in Cork, Ireland. Originally developed as a custom house and opened in 1818, the Cork Harbour Commissioners (later reorganised as the Port of Cork Company) took over the building in 1904. The Port of Cork Company vacated the building in early 2021. The Custom House is, together with a number of other buildings on the same site, listed by Cork City Council on its Record of Protected Structures.

== Location ==
The Custom House is located at the eastern extremity of Cork City's centre island, where the north and south branches of the River Lee reconverge.

== History ==
The Custom House is attributed to designs by Abraham Addison Hargrave, the eldest son (and partner in the architectural practice) of Abraham Hargrave the Elder. Built between 1814 and 1818, the building was used initially by the Inland Revenue, having replaced an old custom house on Emmet Place, now part of the Crawford Art Gallery. It was built on "slob" land, which was reclaimed at a cost of £10,000; the building itself cost £70,000. In 1904, it became the headquarters of the Cork Harbour Commissioners, who took over the building on a 999-year lease.

The building was extended in 1906, with additions including a new boardroom, designed by William Price, the Harbour Engineer. This boardroom, with semicircular tables and upholstered chairs, was described in the Irish Examiner as "one of the finest examples of the commercial interior design of the time". Originally the royal arms were on the building's pediment, being replaced by the city arms in 1957.

As of 2021, the Harbour Commissioners had vacated the building, and a number of developments were proposed for the site. Aspects of the proposed developments, including the proposal to "largely demolish the Revenue Building" (a protected structure on the Custom House Quay site), have been the subject of some opposition, including by the Irish Georgian Society and An Taisce Corcaigh.

== Description ==
The main building is a two-storey three-bay structure over vaults. The facade is in Cork grey limestone: the top two thirds are of dressed ashlar and the lower part is rusticated. At street level there are three recessed arcades with round arches.

The committee room (boardroom) is a wood panelled room with pale cream and gold wallpaper and patterned ceiling. The Custom House also holds a collection of maritime art owned by the Port of Cork Company.

Other buildings on the Custom House site include bonded warehouses (protected structure PS163), and the Revenue Building (protected structure PS818), both also built in 1814.

== See also ==
- Custom House, Dublin
- Custom House, Limerick
- Custom House, Belfast
