= Customs House Hotel =

Customs House Hotel may refer to:

- Newcastle Customs House in New South Wales, Australia
- Customs House Hotel, Maryborough in Queensland, Australia

== See also ==
- Custom House (disambiguation)
- Customs house, government impex office
- Customs house agent, type of licensed agent in India
