= Old Customshouse =

Old Custom House or similar terms may refer to:

- Old Custom House (Cairo, Illinois)
- Old Custom House (Yorktown, Virginia)
- Old Custom House, Montreal
- Old Customs House (Bangkok)
- Old Customs House (Knoxville, Tennessee)
- Old Customs House, Fremantle, Western Australia
- Old Customhouse (Monterey, California)
- Old Customshouse (Erie, Pennsylvania)
- Old Customshouse (Wilmington, Delaware)
- United States Customhouse and Post Office (Wiscasset, Maine), sometimes called Old Customhouse
- The Old Custom House, Dublin, Ireland

== See also ==
- Custom House (disambiguation)
- Old Customs Buildings, Mexico City
- Customs house agent, type of licensed agent in India
