= Custom House, Exeter =

Exeter Custom House
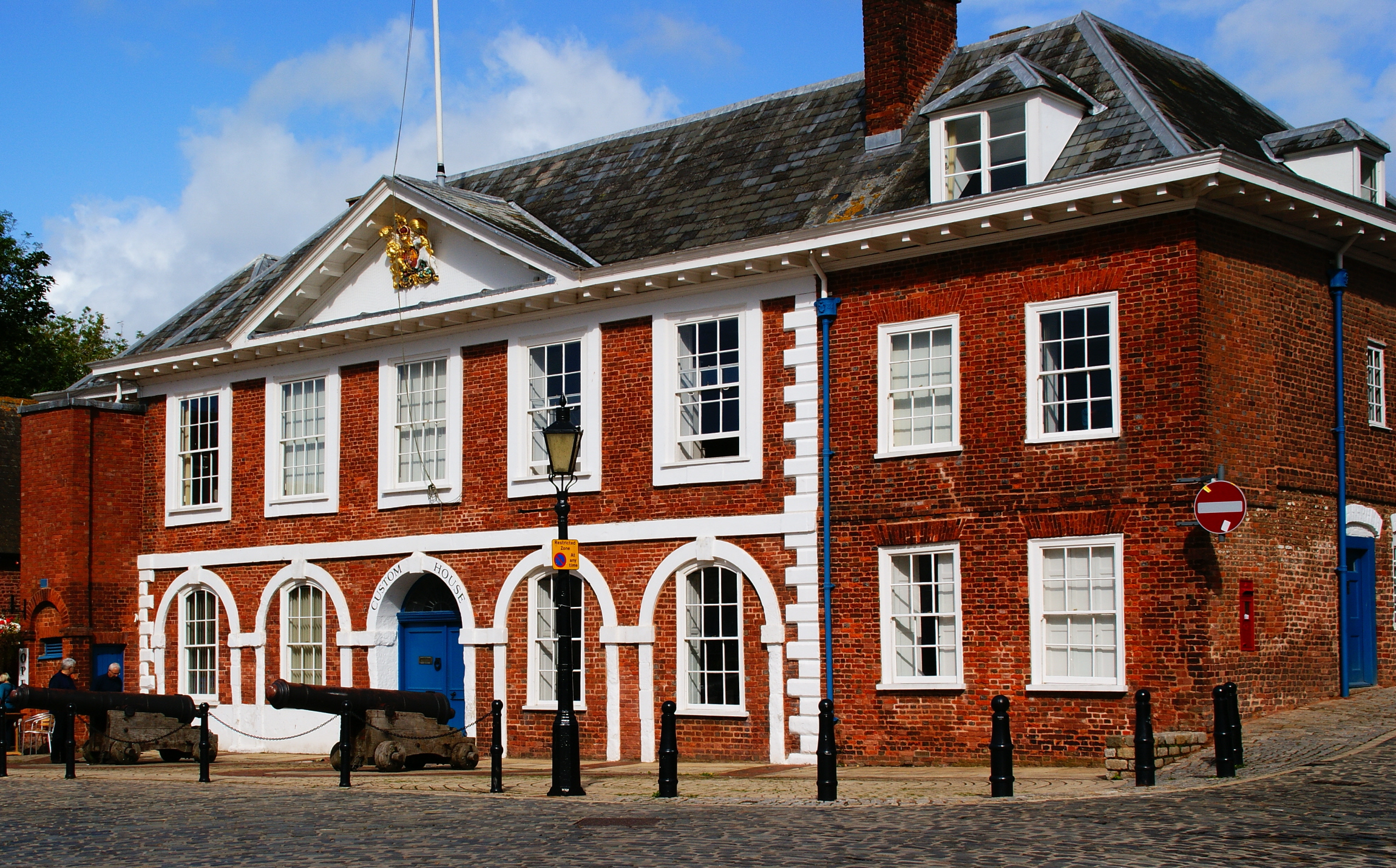
- The former Custom House at Exeter Quay

- Location within Devon

General information
- Type: Custom house
- Location: Exeter Quay, Exeter, England
- Coordinates: 50.71886°N 3.53156°W

This Custom House at Exeter was the first in England built for that purpose. It was operated by HM Customs until 1989. Like other former custom houses in the United Kingdom, it now serves as a visitor attraction. It was built in the late 17th-century and has been Grade I listed since 1953.

== History ==
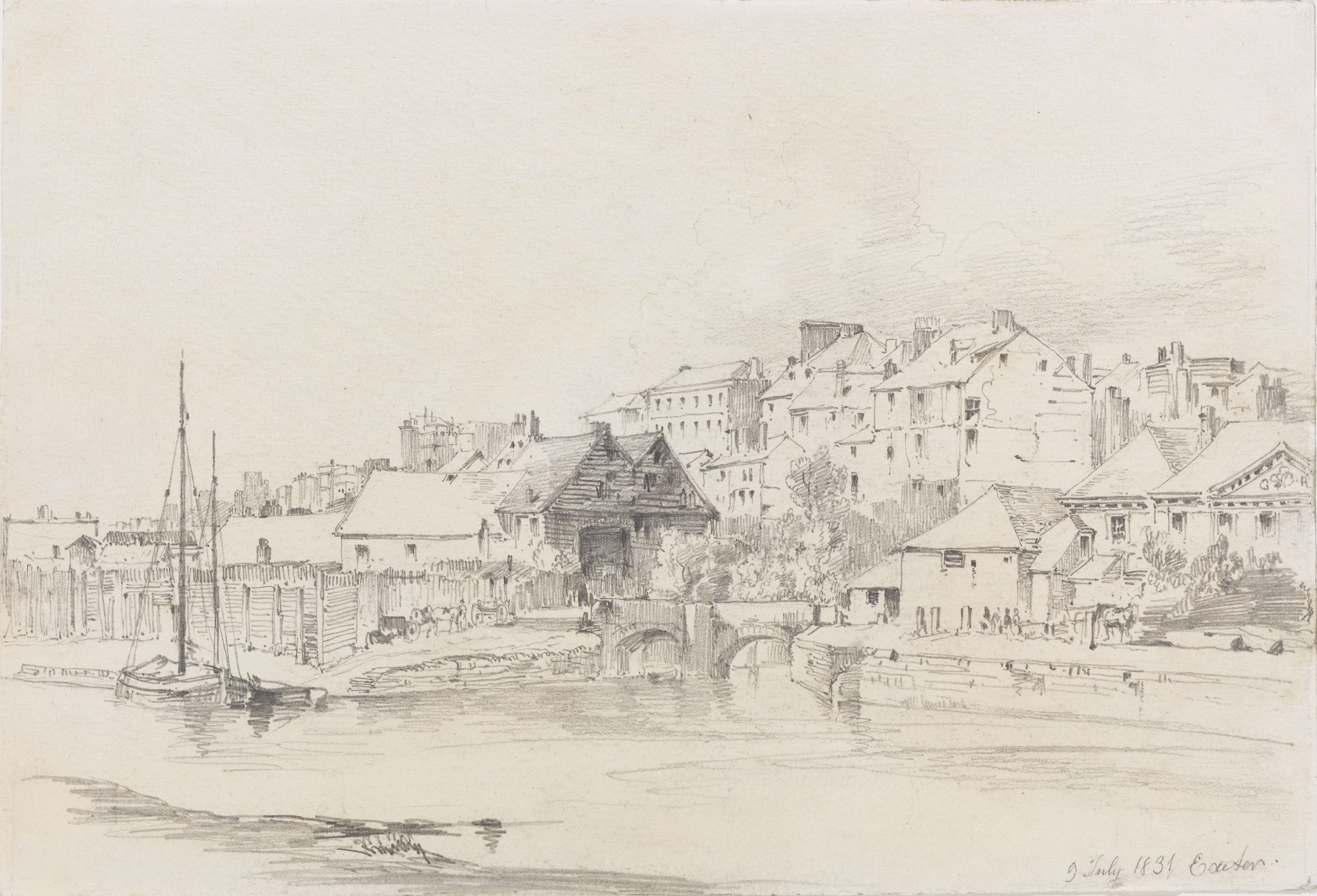
Drawing of Exeter's Custom House and the Quay by Henry Courtney Selous (1830)

The Custom House was built in 1680-81 in response to the increasing trade seen at Exeter Quay, particularly of the woollen cloth industry. Though the quay had existed since Roman times, the construction of the Exeter Ship Canal in 1564-66 led to a considerable increase in trade. The Custom House was built by Richard Allen for a cost of £3,000.

Believed to be the oldest brick building to survive in Exeter, Historic England recorded that the building's "Renaissance-inspired facade and magnificent plasterwork, advanced joinery detail, early use of brick and the centralised double-depth plan are of the first importance in illustrating the arrival of a national or court style to Devon."

== Current use ==
Following its closure, public access to the building was made available through the city's Red Coat Guided Tours. In 2015, the former Custom House reopened as a visitor centre and tourist attraction. A joint project between the Exeter Canal and Quay Trust and Exeter City Council, the centre replaced the original one which had been located at the nearby Quay House. It was officially opened on 21 May.

== See also ==
- Medieval English wool trade
