= Hunt Museum =

Museum of art and antiquities in Limerick City, Ireland

The Hunt Museum
- Iarsmalann Hunt
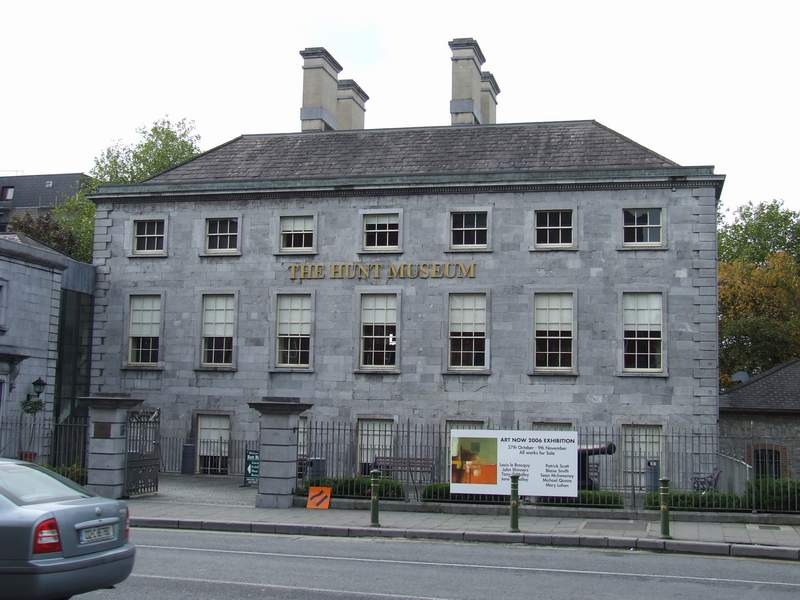
- Façade of the museum contained within the former the Custom House

- Location within Ireland
- Established: 1978; 48 years ago
- Location: Rutland Street, Limerick, Ireland
- Coordinates: 52.6663°N 8.6245°W
- Type: Art museum, Historic site, Antiquities, Fine Art, Private Collection
- Collection size: approx. 2,500 objects
- Founders: John Hunt and Gertrude Hunt
- Public transit access: Limerick Colbert railway station
- Website: www.huntmuseum.com

The Hunt Museum (Irish: Iarsmalann Hunt) is a museum located in the Custom House in the city of Limerick, Ireland. It holds a personal collection donated by the Hunt family, it was originally situated in the University of Limerick, before being moved to its present location in Limerick's Georgian custom house in 1997.

Among the museum's collection are works by notable artists and designers such as Pablo Picasso, Jack B. Yeats, and Sybil Connolly as well as distinctive historical items such as the O'Dea Mitre and Crozier.

== History ==
John and Gertrude Hunt, who were antique dealers and advisors to collectors, acquired a number of pieces that reflected their own interests. During the latter stages of John Hunt's life, the couple began to search for a permanent home for their personal collection, which they wished to remain intact. After meeting with Professor Patrick Doran of the National Institute of Higher Education (NIAH; now University of Limerick) and Dr Edward Walsh, the institute's president, it was agreed that the NIAH would house a substantial part of the collection on a temporary basis. The Hunt Museum opened in an exhibition room at the NIAH in 1978. As the Irish government declined the offer of the Hunt's collection, and the desire to find a home for the artefacts remained, the Hunt Museums Trust was established in 1974 to hold the collection. A property at Craggaunowen (a 16th-century four-storey tower house, typical of late medieval Ireland, purchased and restored by John and Gertrude Hunt) was held in trust on behalf of the people of Ireland. The trust established a company, The Hunt Museum Limited, to establish a permanent home for the museum. A public private partnership, involving the University of Limerick, Shannon Development, Limerick Corporation, the Department of Arts, Heritage, the Gaeltacht and the Islands, and several local business interests, acquired the 18th-century former custom house in Limerick city. The partnership also secured the funds to restore and renovate the building for use as a museum. The museum was officially opened by the Taoiseach John Bruton on 14 February 1997.

== Custom House ==
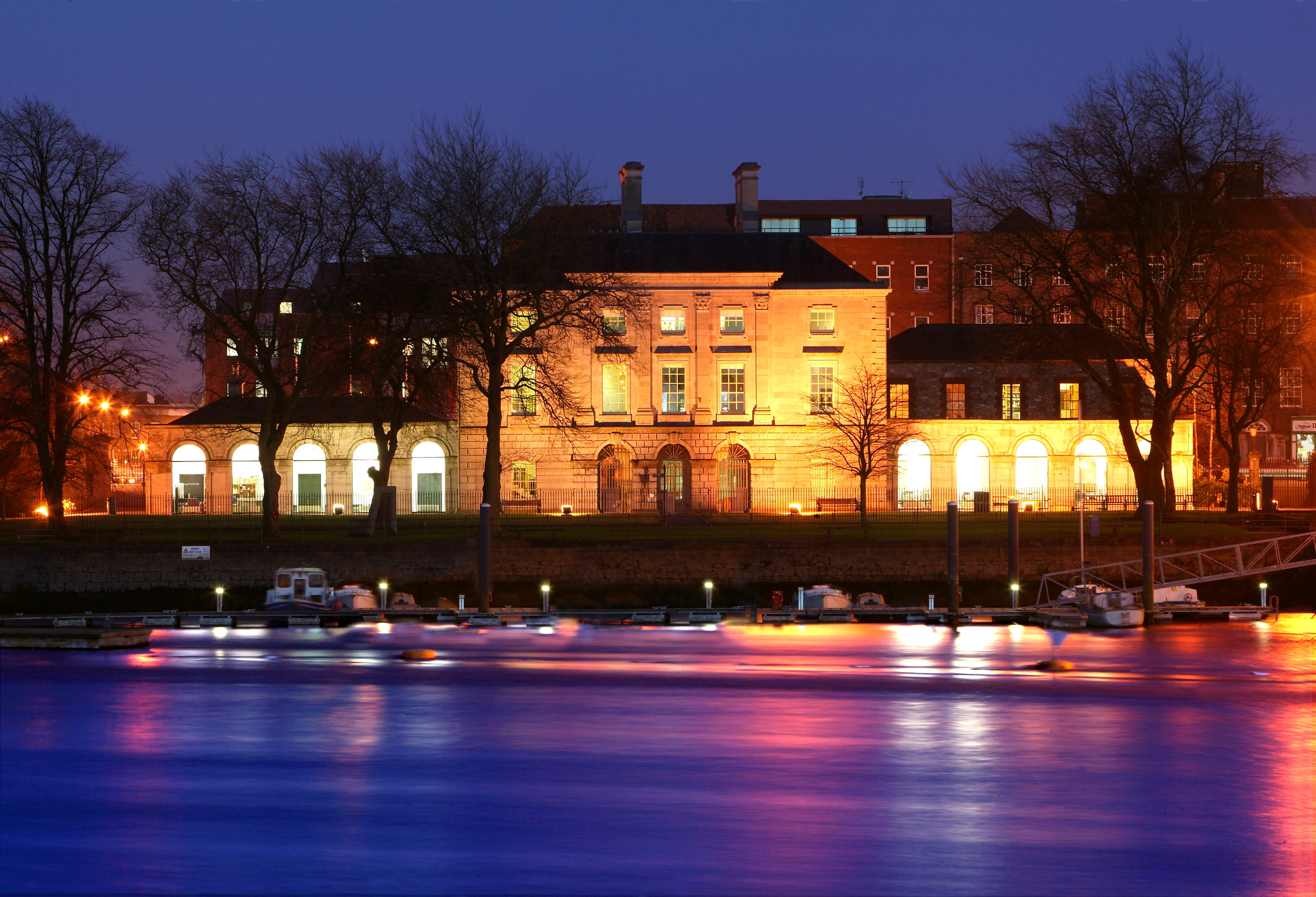
Nighttime view of the front of the Custom House from Clancy's Strand

The Hunt Museum is housed in Limerick's former Custom House, an eighteenth-century building constructed in limestone rather than red brick which was used in the construction of most of the city's Georgian houses. It is a Palladian-style building designed by the Italian architect, Davis Ducart, in 1765 and completed between 1765 and 1769.

The Limerick Custom House was the administrative centre for the Revenue Commissioners (including Customs and Excise) in Limerick and it was also the home of the Customs Collector in the eighteenth century. In the 1840s, with the introduction of a new postal system, a Penny Post Office was opened in the Custom House.

The Office of Public Works (OPW) undertook a major restoration and refurbishment of the building, completing it in 1996. The Custom House opened as The Hunt Museum on 14 February 1997. The anniversary of the opening of The Hunt Museum is celebrated annually as 'Open Day' with free admission, talks, tours, and workshops.

== Collection ==
The Hunt Museum holds about 2,500 different artefacts, both from Ireland and abroad. The oldest pieces are from Stone-Age Ireland and ancient Egypt. The collection includes the Antrim Cross (an early 9th-century cast bronze and enamel cross), dresses by Irish designer Sybil Connolly, drawings by Picasso and a bronze horse once thought to be a design by Leonardo da Vinci for a large monument. The bronze horse is similar to the Budapest horse, but its provenance was disproven in 2009. Some of the Hunt collection is also on display at the nearby Craggaunowen in County Clare, which was also greatly contributed to by John and Gertrude Hunt.

=== Religious artefacts ===
John Hunt was extremely interested in early Christian art and artefacts and he collected them widely, so the museum collection held many religious items from rosary beads to statues of varying sizes, from not just Ireland but from around Europe. The Museums 'Treasury Room' houses a great number of these items and among the artefacts in this room are the Arthur Cross and Arthur Chalice. Also found in the collection are a number of medieval Christian pieces such as the Antrim Cross, the Cashel Bell, and the Hohenzollern Crucifix.

=== Sybil Connolly ===
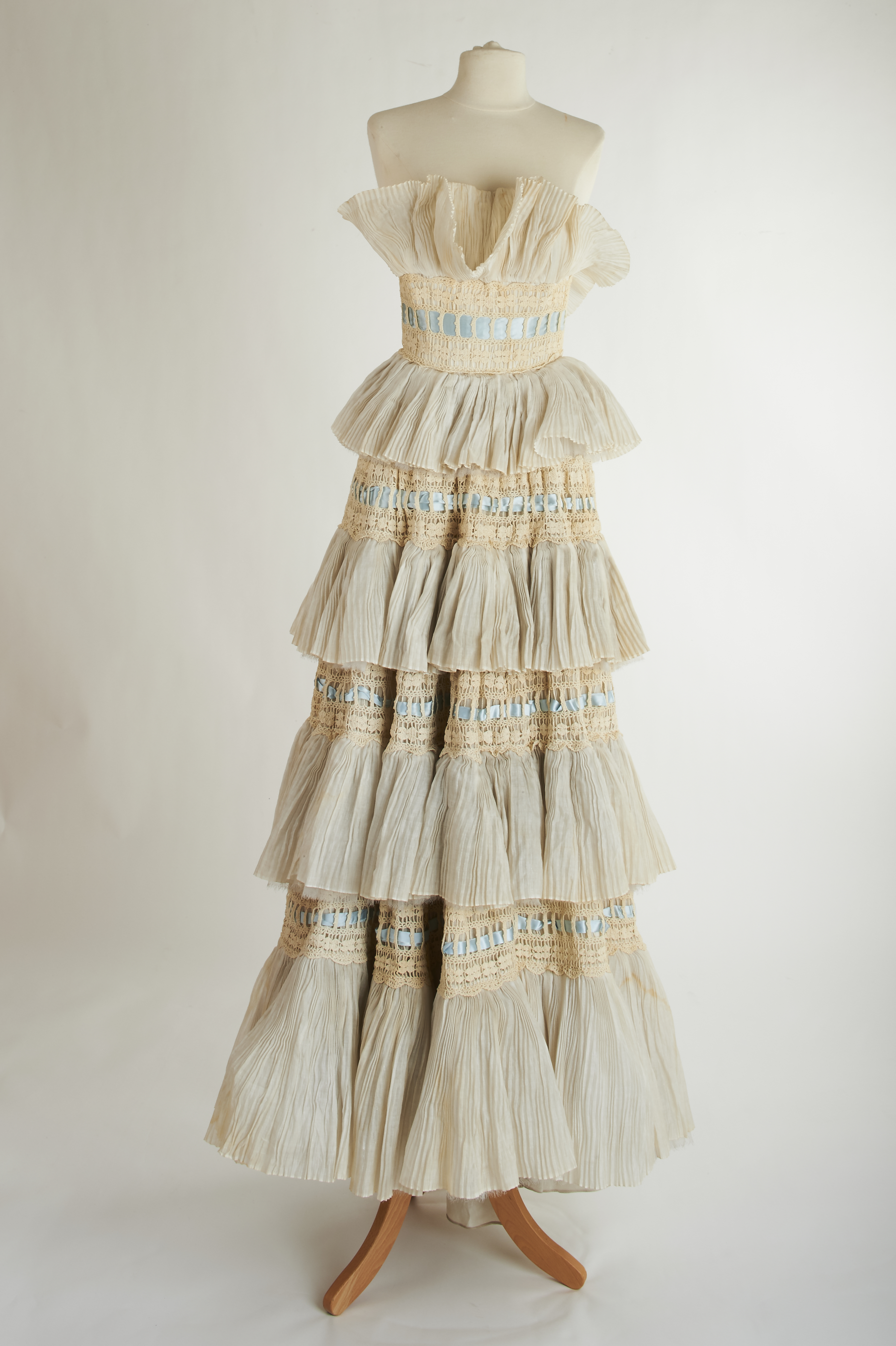
Heiress dress 1957 by Sybil Connolly - Full Length Front

The Sybil Connolly collection at The Hunt Museum is formed by different documents, sketches, letters, photographs, ceramic and textile items. The textile collection is made up for 45 pieces designed by Sybil Connolly during her career. Most of the collection, which includes dresses like the "Heiress Dress" or "Pink Ice Dress", was donated to museum by Gertrude Hunt.

=== Horse Outside ===
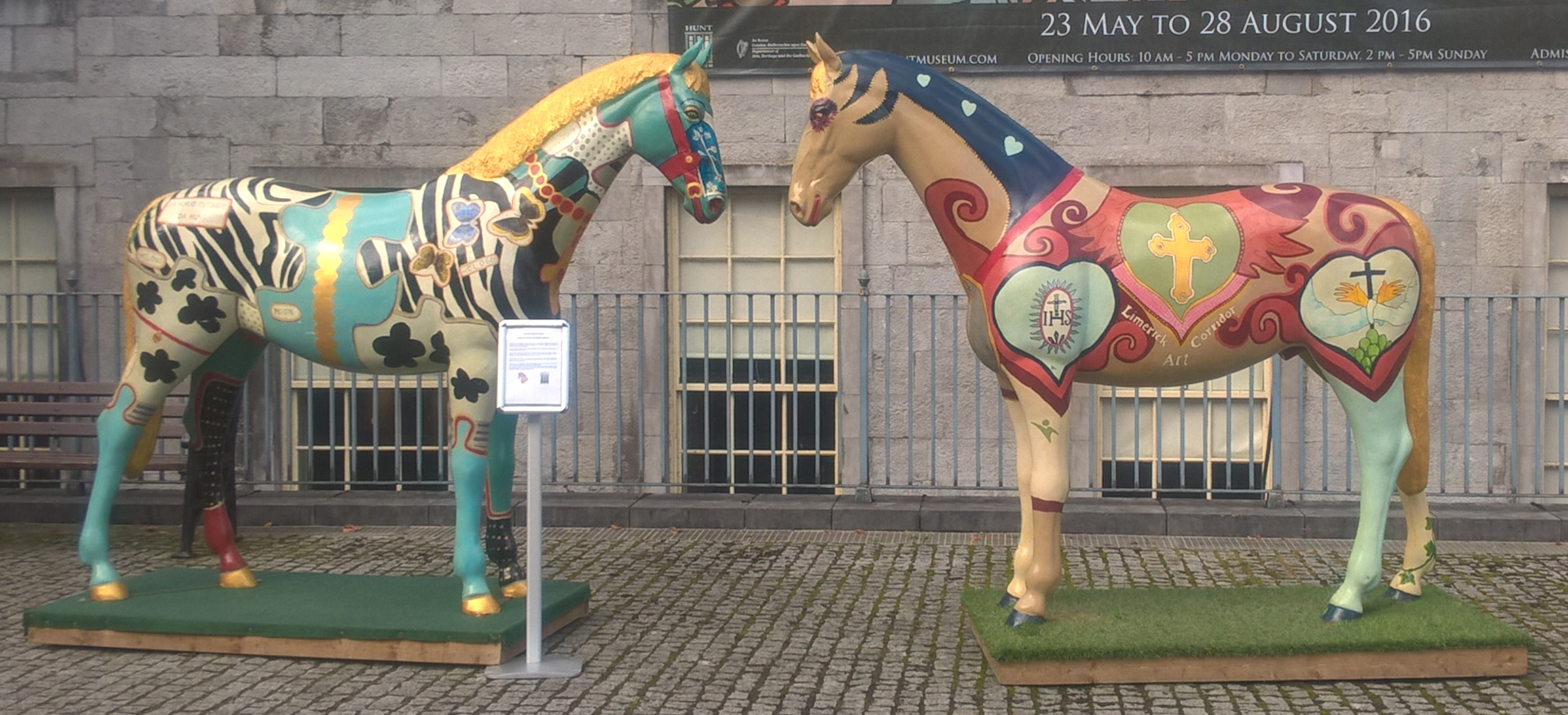
'Horse Outside' art installation

In 2011 a lifesize model of a horse, painted by young people aged 10–18 was placed outside the front of the building. This was joined by a second one in 2012. The models are made of fibreglass, and are taken inside at night. The art installation was inspired by the song Horse Outside by the group The Rubberbandits.

== Controversy ==
In December 2003, the Simon Wiesenthal Center alleged in a letter to President Mary McAleese that the museum's collection contained items looted by the Nazis during the Second World War, although the letter did not refer to any specific items in the collection. The museum denied the claims.

An inquiry led by former Supreme Court judge Donal Barrington was set up by the museum, but its members resigned in February 2005, saying that the museum's funding made an independent inquiry impossible, and requesting that a more appropriate inquiry be created. The Department of Arts then provided €150,000 in funding for a second inquiry led by former civil servant Seán Cromien, under the auspices of the Royal Irish Academy (RIA). The second inquiry submitted an interim report to the RIA in February 2006. In the meantime, in October 2005, the museum had published a catalogue of its exhibits on the internet, providing details of all the items in its collection. In June 2006, the inquiry submitted a final report, which was published on the RIA's website. Also in June 2006, a one-day conference took place on the theme of Contested Cultural Property and Museums: The Case of the Hunt Museum. At this conference, a message was conveyed from Shimon Samuels, who had sent the original letter of allegation, questioning why he had not been invited to the seminar. Later, the terms of reference of the Hunt Museum Evaluation Group were questioned, the Simon Wiesenthal Center believing that more emphasis should have been placed on investigating the purported Nazi links of the Hunt family and the Hunt Museum Evaluation Group believing that this lay beyond their terms of reference, which were to do with provenance research. The RIA issued a press release responding to the statement of the Simon Wiesenthal Center.

=== Resolution ===
A 2007 report from Lynn Nicholas, published by the RIA following three years of investigation, called the Wiesenthal Center's allegations "unprofessional in the extreme". Nicholas found that the Wiesenthal Center had misidentified names in the letters:

"The name used, four times in one letter, is Buhl, not Buhrle, and the individual described, an unreliable dealer who sells forgeries, certainly bears no resemblance to the extremely rich collector and armaments manufacturer Emil Buhrle," the report said.

In 2008, the Simon Wiesenthal Center published a 165-page analysis entitled, "The Hunt Controversy: A Shadow Report", written by Erin Gibbons, which covered the history of the controversy and the findings.

== See also ==
- Limerick City Gallery of Art
- Limerick City Museum
- List of museums in the Republic of Ireland
