= Craggaunowen =

- Creagán Eoghain
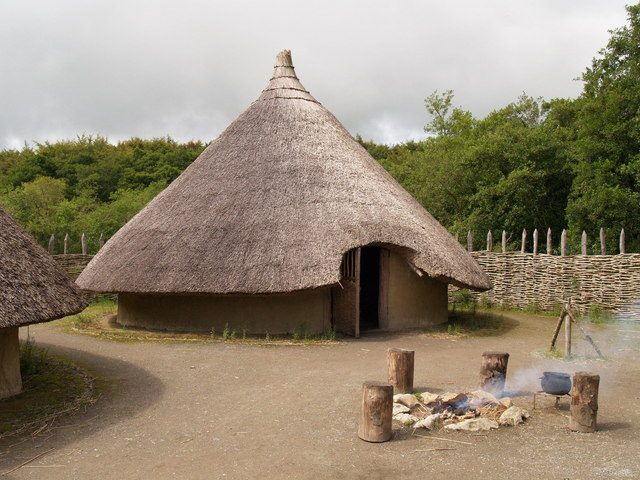
- Conical hut on the reconstructed crannóg

- Location within Ireland
- Established: 1965
- Location: Craggaunowen, Kilmurry, County Clare, Ireland
- Coordinates: 52.8110°N 8.7936°W
- Type: open-air museum
- Founder: John Hunt
- Public transit access: none
- Parking: On-site
- Website: www.shannonheritage.com/Craggaunowen/

Craggaunowen is an archaeological open-air museum in eastern County Clare, Ireland. It is named for the 16th-century castle which is one of its main components.

Craggaunowen is located 10 km east of Quin village. The name Craggaunowen derives from its Irish name Creagán Eoghain (Owen's little rocky hill). The site is operated by Shannon Heritage.

== Open-air museum ==
The open-air museum, sometimes described as a "Living Past Experience", was started by John Hunt on the site around the castle. It contains reconstructions of ancient Irish architecture including a dolmen, a crannog and the currach boat used in Tim Severin's recreation of "The Voyage of St. Brendan the Abbot". It also shows reconstructions of a Ringfort, Fulachta Fia (Bronze Age cooking and industrial site) and Standing Stone (Ogham Stone).

=== Castle ===
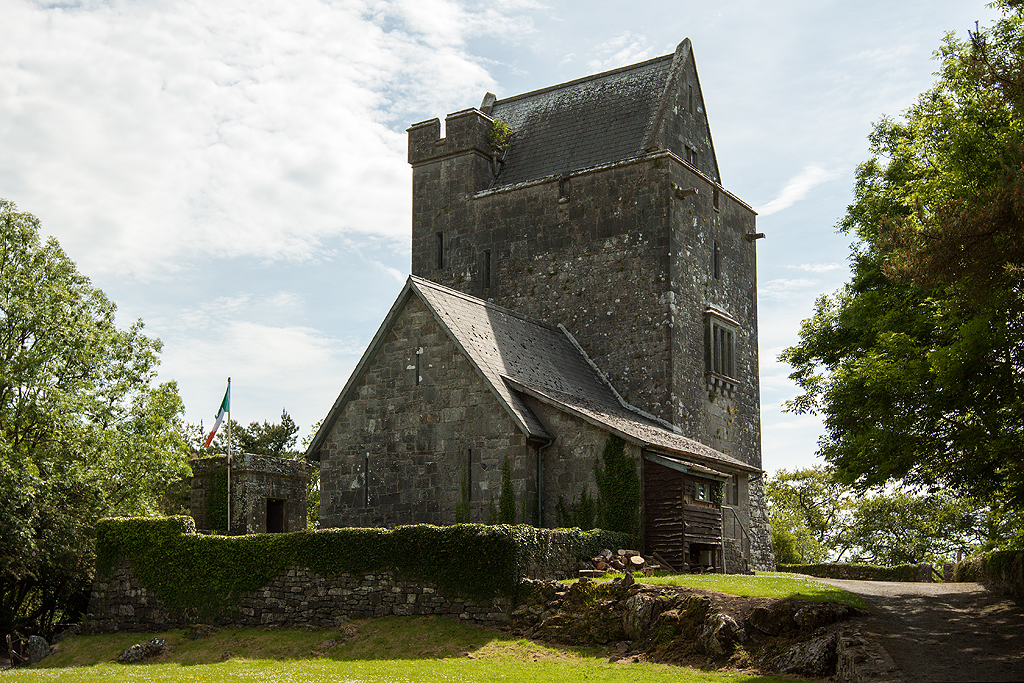
16th century tower house at Craggaunowen

==== Origins to ruins ====
Craggaunowen Castle was built around 1550 by John MacSioda MacNamara, a descendant of Sioda MacNamara, who built Knappogue Castle in 1467. It was left in ruins in the 17th century, and rendered uninhabitable by the removal of the roof and staircase, and indefensible by removal of the battlements, at the time of the Cromwellian confiscations around 1653.

==== 19th century ====
The tower house remained a ruin until it and the estate of Cullane House across the road, were inherited in 1821 by "Honest" Tom Steele, a confederate of Daniel O'Connell, "The Liberator".

Steele had the castle rebuilt as a summer house in the 1820s and he used it, and the turret on the hill opposite, as places of recreation. His initials can be seen on one of the quoin-stones to the right outside. Following his death in 1848 the lands were divided, Cullane going to one branch of his family, Craggaunowen to his niece Maria Studdert. Eventually, having passed through the hands of his descendants, the castle and grounds were acquired by the "Irish Land Commission". Much of the poor quality land was given over to forestry and the castle itself was allowed to fall into disrepair.

By the time of the First Ordnance Survey in the 1840s, the castle was in ruins again. In the mid-19th century, the castle, herder's house and 96 acres were reported in the possession of a Reverend William Ashworth, who held them from a Caswell (a member of a family from County Clare just north of Limerick).

==== 20th century and restoration ====
In 1906, a mansion house at the site was owned by Count James Considine (from a family based at Derk, County Limerick).

Craggaunowen Castle was bought and restored by antiquarian John Hunt in the 1960s. Hunt added an extension to the ground floor, which for a while housed part of his collection of antiquities. The collection was later moved to the University of Limerick and as of 2022 is held at the Hunt Museum in the city of Limerick.
