= Rearing Horse and Mounted Warrior =

Sculpture attributed to Leonardo da Vinci

Rearing Horse and Mounted Rider
- Budapest horse
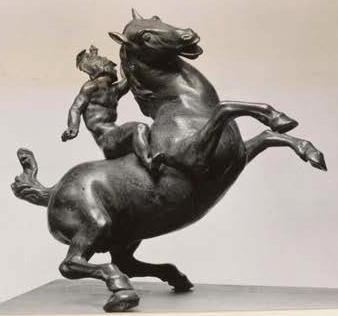
- Artist: Leonardo da Vinci
- Year: First half of the 16th century
- Medium: Bronze
- Subject: Francis I of France on a destrier horse
- Dimensions: 24 cm × 15 cm × 28 cm (9.4 in × 5.9 in × 11 in)
- Weight: 2.39 kilograms
- Location: Budapest Museum of Fine Arts, Budapest

The Rearing Horse and Mounted Warrior or Budapest horse is a bronze sculpture attributed to Leonardo da Vinci. Depicting Francis I of France on a destrier horse, it is estimated to have been cast from a clay or wax model in the first half of the 16th century. The sculpture is in the permanent exhibit of the Budapest Museum of Fine Arts.

== Description ==
The bronze statuette consists of the horse and a detachable rider. It has an applied green patina on top of black paint patina, typical of Renaissance works. Both parts are hollow, and attached together are 24 cm high, 15 cm wide, and 28 cm long (9.4 in by 5.9 in by 11 in), and weigh 2.39 kilograms (5.3 lb). The parts were cast separately, including the horse's rump and tail section that was used to extract the core, but nevertheless at the same time. There is minimal trace of finishing on the statuette; many of the holes and casting flaws on both the horse and the rider have not been chiseled off or filled, which suggests an intent of preserving a model rather than making a final cast.

The rider is wearing a Greek-style helmet with its visor tipped up, encircled by a crown, with a serpent-tailed dragon on the back. He is holding a shield in his left hand, and originally had a sword or a lance in his right hand, but only the hilt is now left. Similar horses and riders, some in exactly the same position, are depicted in many of Leonardo's studies of horses owned by the Milanese nobleman Galéas de Saint-Séverin. The depiction of the rider is less defined than the horse or Leonardo's other works.

Hungarian art historian Mária Aggházy noticed a resemblance between the content-looking rider and the young Francis I of France, soon to be king, and Leonardo's patron from his later years. Francis was an avid participant in jousting tournaments, which in the more entertaining but also more dangerous French style were run with less armour and other equipment than in Italy. Aggházy theorised that the rider's light clothing, likely after a victorious duel, demonstrated bravery on Francis's part as he followed the chivalrous ideals of the Nine Worthies.

== History ==
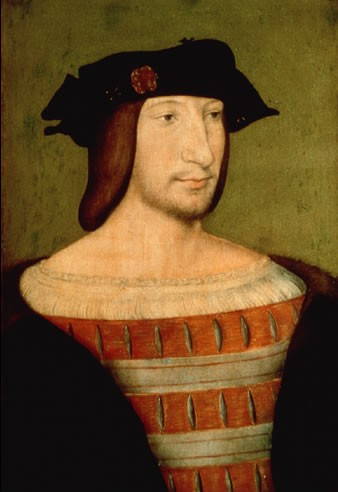
Young Francis I by Jean Clouet c.1515

In 1516, after invitations from King Francis I of France and his predecessor, Louis XII, Leonardo moved to France and entered the service of Francis I. Art chronicler Gian Paolo Lomazzo, close to Leonardo's heirs, wrote in 1584 that Leonardo had made several models of horses for Francis. This statuette is believed to be one of them.

Towards the end of his life, Leonardo was working on several equestrian monuments, and did several studies of horses on worksheets that have been preserved in the Royal Collection in Windsor Castle. This statuette was depicted in sketches from c.1490 and c.1517–1518 with and without the rider. By then Leonardo was unable to continue with artwork much beyond sketches, but did for instance supervise bronze casting of statues at the king's Palace of Fontainebleau.

By 1540, Leonardo's follower Leone Leoni was also commissioned to create an equestrian statuette while he was a court sculptor to Charles V, who governed Milan at the time. In 1549 and 1550, Leoni sent several letters to Antoine Perrenot de Granvelle requesting that Leonardo's statuette from the king's court be sent back to him. An equestrian bronze model was recorded in the Leoni collection at their home Casa degli Omenoni before the collection was dispersed by 1620.

The outline of the statuette also features in a c.1545 scrollwork from the Fontainebleau workshops of Francis I. The scrollwork has a detailed design for the decoration of a horse's chanfron head armour to be used in jousting.

=== Modern history ===
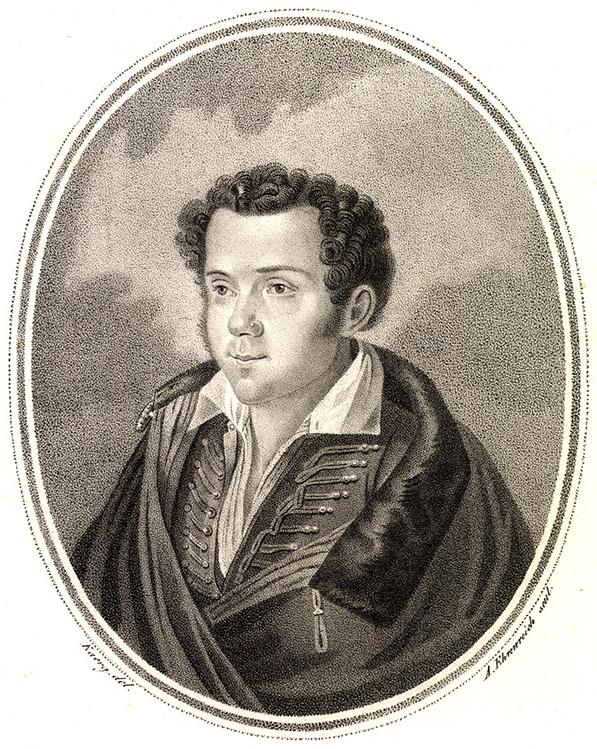
István Ferenczy in 1810 by Sándor Ádám Ehrenreich

In 1818, a Hungarian sculptor, István Ferenczy, moved from Hungary to Rome and spent 6 years there as a student of the acclaimed sculptors Bertel Thorvaldsen and Antonio Canova. During his stay in Rome, Ferenczy gathered a collection of 82 works of art, including this statuette, which he had acquired in the mistaken belief that it was a Greek work. In 1846 he prepared an inventory with the intention of selling the collection to the Hungarian state, still with the statuette as an ancient work from Athens, but the sale did not go through. As Ferenczy's will stated that the crates of his collection were not to be opened for 50 years, the collection remained untouched for a long time after his death in 1856. The family reached a deal with the Museum of Fine Arts in Budapest and sold the collection to them in 1914, still none the wiser about the statuette. After discovering its provenance, the heirs sued the museum for a misleading sale and poor payments during the aftermath of World War I.

Simon Meller, the curator of the Budapest museum, began exploring the statuette with more knowledge of Leonardo's equestrian works. He came to the conclusion that the style of the statuette is consistent with Leonardo's other works, particularly those in the studies for the painting of The Battle of Anghiari and the Trivulzio monument. He attributed the statuette to Leonardo da Vinci for the first time since the 17th century, and published it in a 1916 journal of the museums in the Prussian region. To mark the occasion, another sculptor in the Ferenczy family, Béni Ferenczy, gifted Meller a commemorative medal with a relief of the statuette. The statuette became a permanent exhibit in the museum in the 1920s.

The 1940s were a tumultuous time for Europe's artworks, with the statuette, the Holy Crown of Hungary, and many other works of art captured in the Nazi plunder. During World War II, Hungary joined the Axis powers in 1940. In September 1942, Russia unexpectedly bombed Budapest. The museum began the protection of their works of art by packing them into crates and moving them to lower floors. Considered one of the most precious works in the museum's collection, the statuette and the works of Old Masters were taken further west from the Eastern Front to Veszprém in early 1943. Once Hungary started attempts to reach peace with the Allies, Germany invaded the country in March 1944.

The Museum of Fine Arts was under the control of the Ministry of Education, where the newly installed Ferenc Rajniss, sympathetic to the Nazi rule, ordered the majority of the museum's artwork to be sent to Austria. The director of the museum had no trace of their whereabouts. In late 1944, the Red Army captured Budapest in the Budapest Offensive, and damaged or destroyed a large part of the buildings in the city. The Museum of Fine Arts building suffered damage to its roof, ruining the halls on the top floor, which prior to its evacuation housed the collection with the statuette. Some of the remaining artwork was smashed or burned by the Soviets. The museum did not hear of the evacuated art again until after the end of the war. In August 1945, they were contacted by the "Monuments Men" working in the Monuments, Fine Arts, and Archives program in Munich. They had been cataloging art looted by the Nazis, and at the Munich Central Collecting Point had works of art from the Budapest Museum of Fine Arts. The statuette, along with most of the other artwork, was returned to the museum by 1947.

The statuette was exhibited in London in 1930. More recently, it was in New York, Washington and Atlanta in 2009, and in Los Angeles in 2010. During the renovation of the Budapest museum until 2018, it has been on another tour: Paris and Mantova, Italy in 2016, Madrid in 2017, and Buenos Aires in 2018.

== Attribution ==
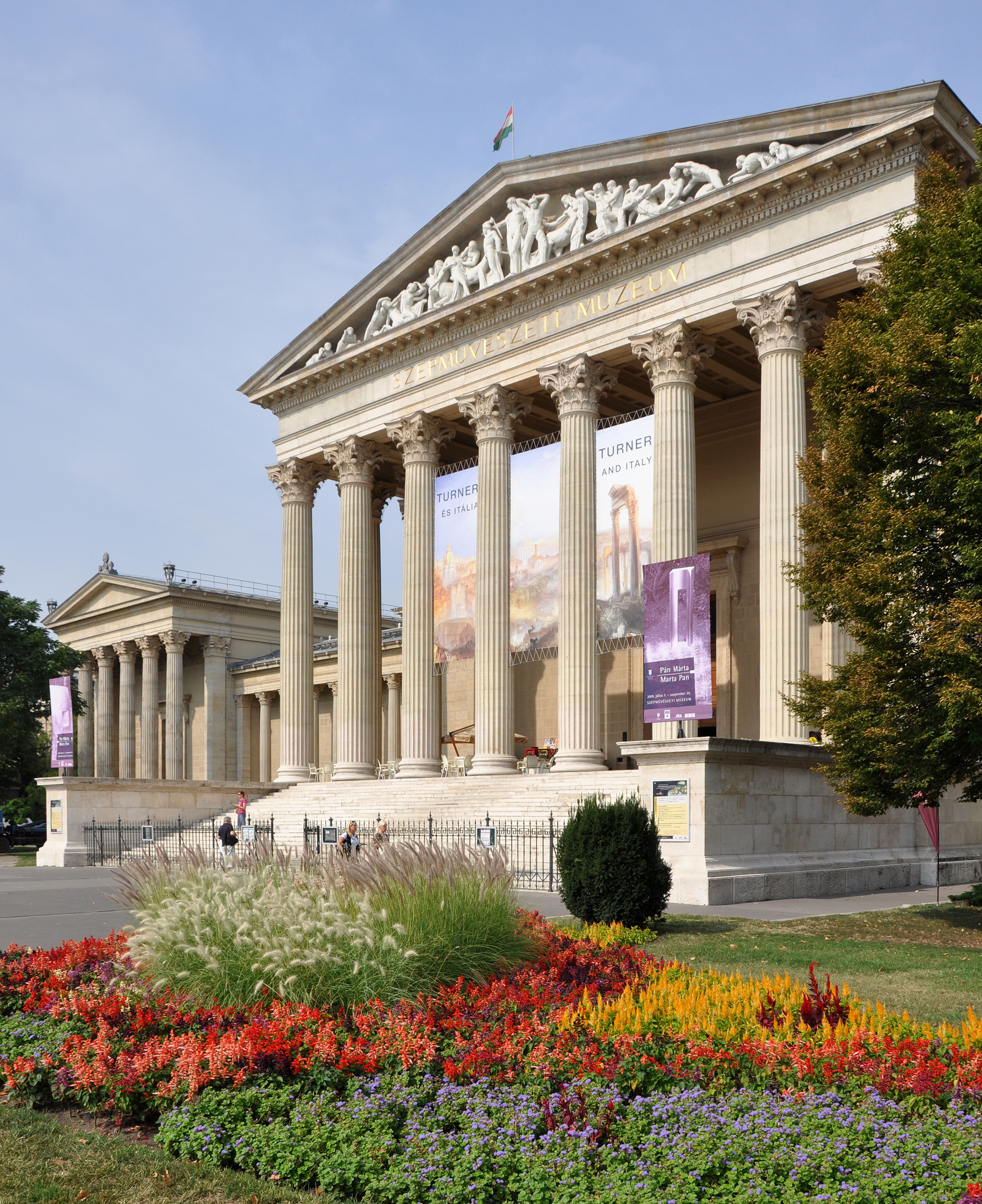
Museum of Fine Arts in Budapest

The statuette was attributed to Leonardo in 1916 by Simon Meller, the curator at the Budapest Museum of Fine Arts, due to its similarities to Leonardo's drawings. Mária Aggházy summarised the attribution in the 1970s and 80s beyond the comparisons to Leonardo's drawings, by saying that the rider's composure matches the reported personality of the young to-be-king Francis I of France, that there is no armour or saddle as is suitable for French jousting, that the figure is wearing a royal-style crown ornament, and that the statuette was depicted in later French artwork for jousting.

The attribution has been widely accepted, more seriously than other sculpture attributions to Leonardo, and according to art historian Martin Kemp, is well supported. There is, however, some doubt, especially on the rider.

In the 1920s, following Meller's attribution, a dozen art scholars published their opinions about the statuette. Half of them, including Edmund Hildebrandt, agreed with Meller's attribution, and the rest thought it was a later work by one of Leonardo's pupils. L.H. Heydenreich wrote in 1954 that the statuette proves Leonardo's competency for casting in bronze. In more recent publications, Martin Kemp noted the unusual lack of attention to detail on the horse's anatomy, which others have echoed due to the extreme bending of the horse's hind legs and a perceived lack of energy typical to Leonardo's other works. The quality of the surface modelling suggests that the bronze cast may have been made by one of Leonardo's pupils from a wax model of his, as in one of Leonardo's worksheets he had made a note to himself to "make a little one of wax about four inches long" next to horse sketches. Kenneth Clark, Martin Kemp, and Carlo Pedretti all suggested that the note refers to the Budapest statue. Some believe the statuette is merely based on one of Leonardo's sketches. Giovanni Francesco Rustici has also been considered as the sculptor.

Technical evidence from a 2009 investigation organised by the National Gallery of Art suggests that the statuette was cast near or after Leonardo's death in 1519 using the lost wax technique. The composition of the metal alloy is identical in all the parts of the statuette, apart from the modern pin used to attach the rider.

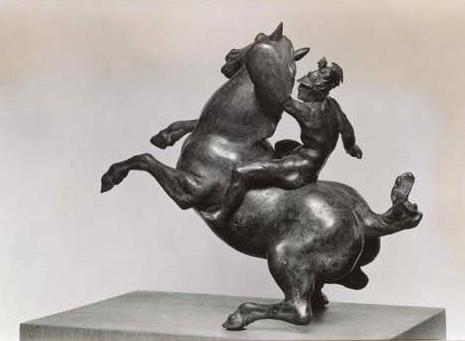
Reverse side of the statuette

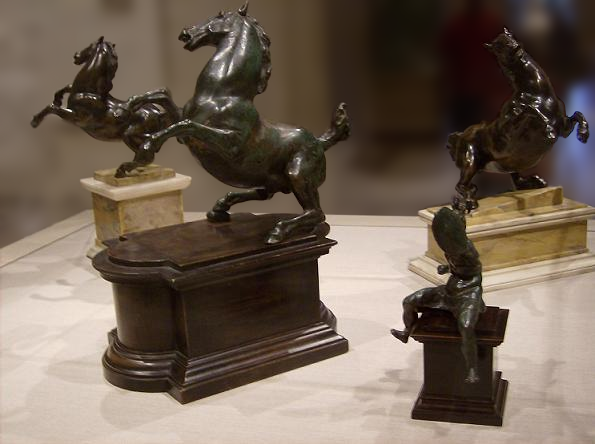
NGA exhibition in 2009, left-to-right: Limerick horse, Budapest horse, New York horse, and the Mounted Warrior in the foreground

Equestrian statuettes with only slight variations to the Rearing Horse and Mounted Warrior have been discovered over the years. They are often referred to by their location. Particularly the Rearing Horse at the Metropolitan Museum of Art in New York and in the Hunt Museum in Limerick, Ireland, have been considered as being by an early follower of Leonardo, such as Leone Leoni. The three were exhibited for the 1969 Congress of the Comité International d'Histoire de l'Art as "Horses of Leonardo da Vinci" with reservation on their attribution. For repeat exhibitions in the US in 2009–2010, the National Gallery of Art investigation confirmed the New York and Limerick horses to be the result of techniques and alloys available only since the 19th century.

Another horse, a mirror image of the New York statuette with the horse facing left, was in London in the collection of art critic Pierre Jeannerat (d. 1983). The London statuette was exhibited in 1961–62 in London, Amsterdam and Florence as Leonardo's, but has since been attributed to sculptors after the 17th century artist Jan de Bisschop. A similar statuette in the Speed Art Museum in Kentucky was once associated with this group of statuettes, but has since been attributed to Rustici or Willem Danielsz van Tetrode.

The provenance of the rider is disputed due to its size and lesser quality of work. Because the current attachment of the rider is modern, the horse lacks a saddle, and the rider is of smaller scale than the horse, the National Gallery of Art considered the possibility that the rider is a later addition. In their 2009 exhibit, the Rearing Horse was for the first time displayed separately from the Mounted Warrior, which was placed beside the horse. The Hermitage Museum in Saint Petersburg, Russia, holds a horseman statuette that shares the crude features of the Budapest rider. Titled Warrior, it has been attributed to Leone Leoni or one of his followers, and may be based on the same model as the Mounted Warrior.

== See also ==
- List of works by Leonardo da Vinci
