= Custom House (Sag Harbor, New York) =

Historic house on Long Island, New York, U.S.

- Sag Harbor Custom House
- U.S. Historic district – Contributing property
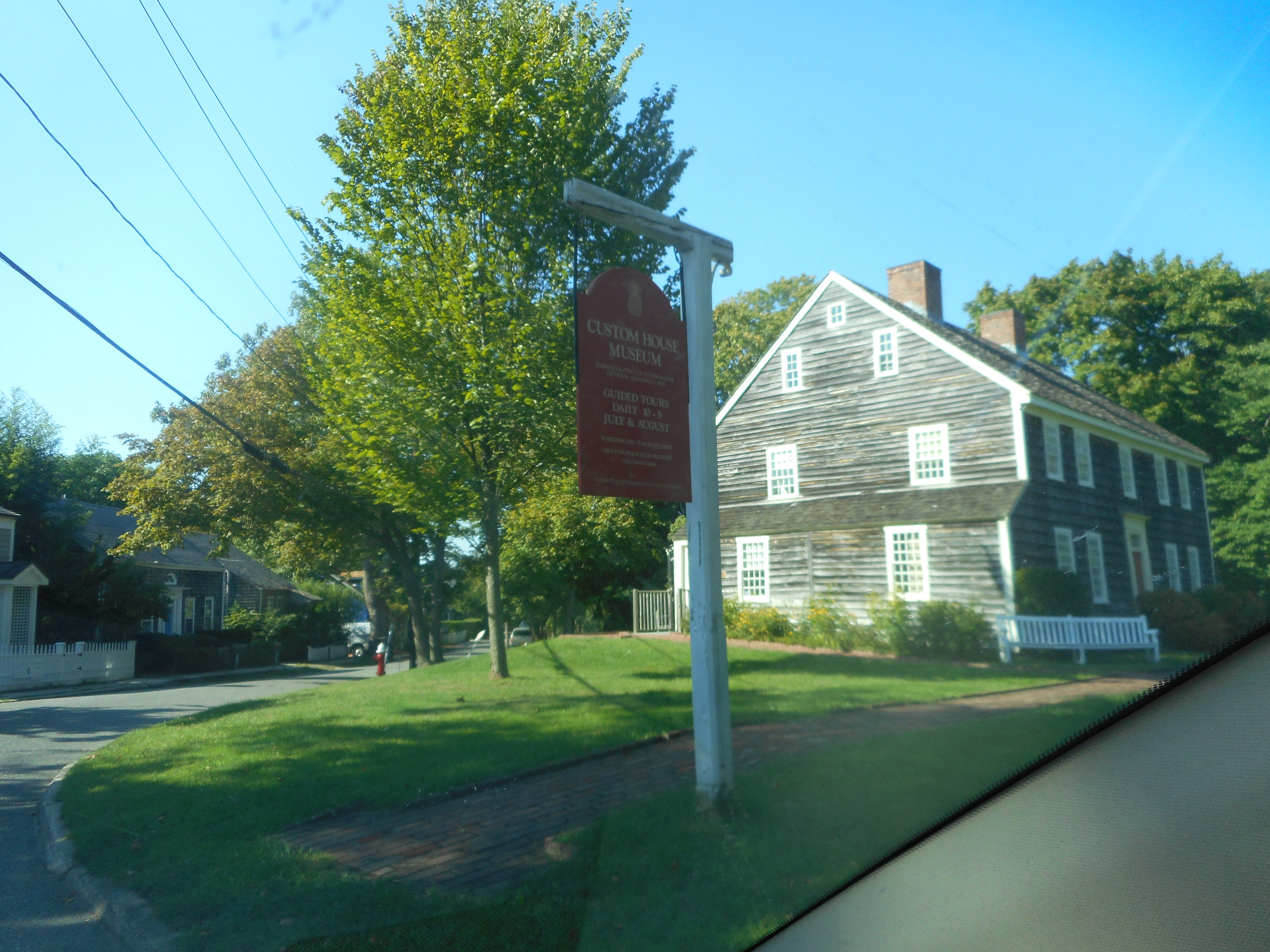
- The Sag Harbor Customs House as seen from Garden Street in 2015.

- Location within New York Location within the United States
- Interactive map showing the location of Custom House
- Location: 192 Main Street (and Garden Street), Sag Harbor, New York
- Coordinates: 40.998154°N 72.297536°W
- Built: 1765 (or 1770)
- Architectural style: Georgian
- Part of: Sag Harbor Village District (ID94000400)
- Designated CP: May 10, 1994

The Sag Harbor Custom House is a historic house located in Sag Harbor, Suffolk County, New York, originally built around 1770. The Sag Harbor Custom House is best known for being the home and office of Henry Packer Dering (1763–1822), one of Sag Harbor's first customs master and postmaster following the harbor's designation as a United States Federal Port of Entry in 1789. The house has been altered and many efforts to restore it have been made throughout the years, including the house's relocation to its current site to save it from demolition. The Custom House is currently operated by Preservation Long Island and used to educate the public about the history of Sag Harbor and the Dering family.

== Sag Harbor history ==
Sag Harbor is a village located in Suffolk County, Long Island, and is home to the Sag Harbor Custom House. Earliest records of Sag Harbor appear in the accounts of the Trustees of the Town of Southampton, dating back to 1707. Few inhabitants occupied Sag Harbor until the 1730s, when the number of inhabitants began to increase due to the attraction of the area's natural protected harbor. The economic life of Sag Harbor centered around maritime activities, and as coastal trading increased in the area, travelers from neighboring communities began to settle in Sag Harbor. Around 1761, the first wharf was built to support the whaling industry, serving as a catalyst for Sag Harbor's growing economy. Shortly following its construction, windmills, shipyards, and warehouses opened nearby. In 1762, Sag Harbor's first ship was built, and at the start of the following decade, trade with the West Indies began.

The Revolutionary War brought Sag Harbor's growth to a halt. Following the Battle of Long Island (1776), the British occupied the region until the war's end in 1783. During this period, the British took over Sag Harbor, occupying houses of residents and setting up a garrison and naval blockade on the harbor. It was only after the war ended that Sag Harbor began to slowly rebuild itself into the prospering harbor it once was. Beginning in the late 1780s, Sag Harbor began to flourish. It founded its first schoolhouse in 1786/87, its first meeting house in 1791, and established Long Island's first printed newspaper, Frothingham's Long Island Herald in 1791. Following the ratification of the United States Constitution, Sag Harbor became a Federal Port of Entry in 1789, only second in importance to New York City. The Custom House was established that same year, and the Post Office not long thereafter in 1794. Both the Custom House and the Post Office were placed under the administrative supervision of Henry Packer Dering (1763–1822).

== The Derings ==
=== Henry Packer Dering (1763–1822) ===
Henry Packer Dering served as the first custom master of Sag Harbor's Custom House beginning in 1790, following his move from his family's home on Shelter Island. Henry Packer Dering was the son of Thomas Dering (1720–1785) and Mary Sylvester. In addition to being a signer of the Continental Association (1774), Thomas Dering served as the inspector of trade and navigation at the Port of New London before the Revolutionary War. Mary Sylvester, daughter of Brinley Sylvester, inherited a large estate on Shelter Island which was then inherited by Thomas Dering when they married, making the Derings a leading family of Shelter Island. Thomas Dering's devotion to the patriot cause played a role in George Washington's appointing of Henry Packer Dering, making him the first customs master to be instated under the new Constitution. In addition to serving as custom master, Dering was also made inspector of the revenue and collector of Sag Harbor in 1791, and postmaster in 1794. He held all three offices until his death on April 30, 1822. With these jobs, Dering was responsible for weighing and gauging cargoes, hearing oaths of registry and citizenship, and overseeing statements regarding truthfulness and reliability of mail delivery. Dering also oversaw the operations of lighthouses Little Gull Island, Cedar Island, and Montauk.

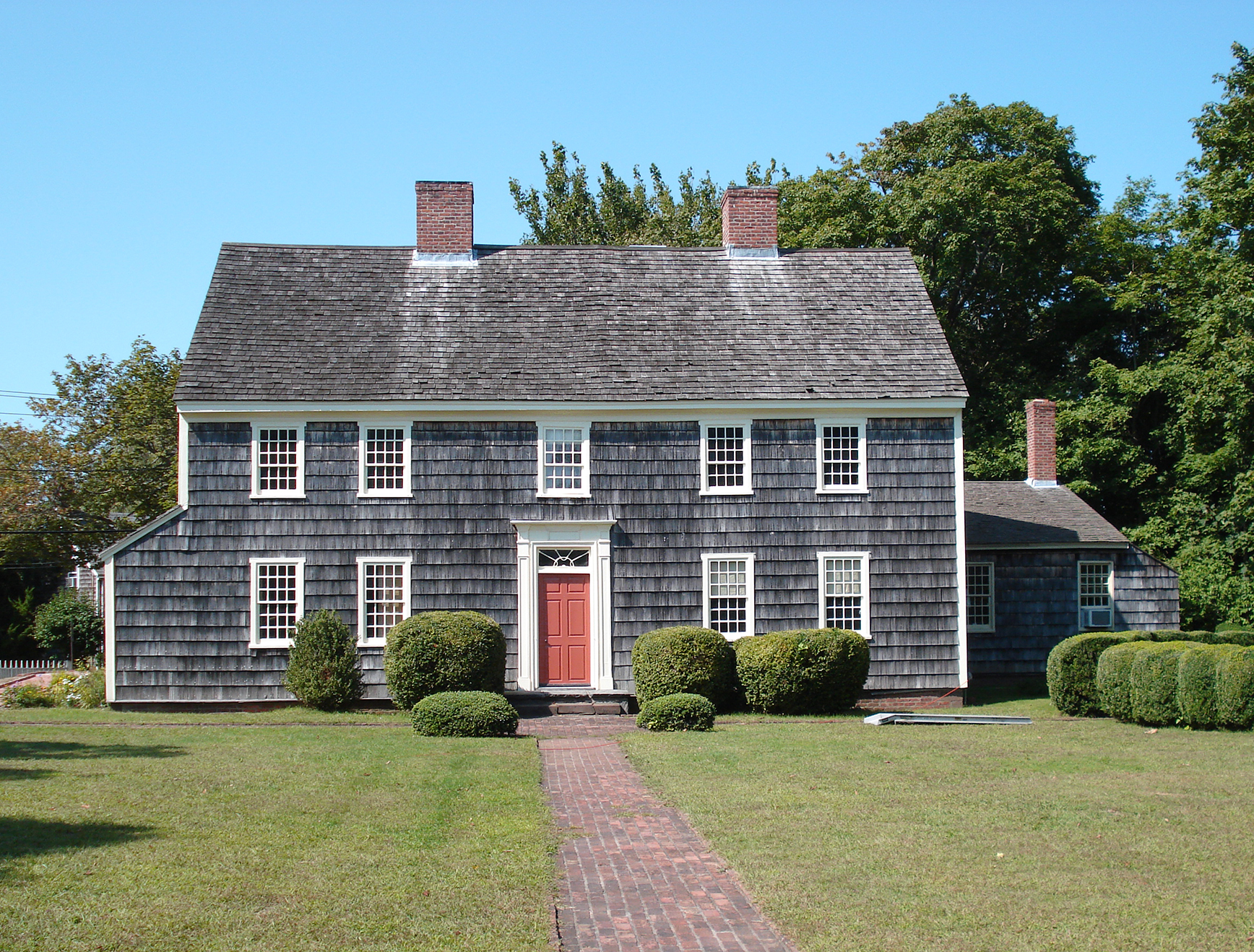
The building in 2008

Henry Packer Dering married Anna Fosdick (1769–1852) in December 1793. He purchased the Custom House, which served both as Dering's office and private residence, sometime before March 24, 1794. Henry and his wife, Anna, lived in the house with their nine children (seven of which lived to adulthood), expanding the structure as their family grew. A number of people the Derings enslaved lived in the house as well. Dering struggled financially, and on May 14, 1842, the family sold the Custom House to cover debts.

=== Henry Thomas Dering (1796–1854) ===
Henry Thomas Dering was the oldest son of Henry Packer Dering and Anna Dering. He succeeded his father and served as custom master from 1822 to 1829, then again between 1842 and 1845, and finally from 1846 to 1849.

== Building and Architecture ==
=== Exterior ===
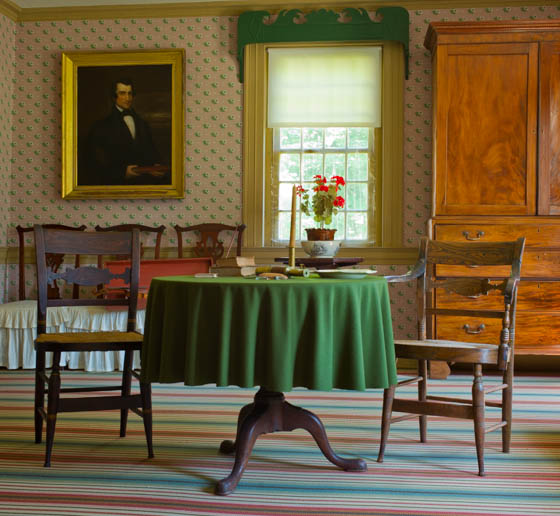
The parlor room inside the Custom House.

The Custom House is a two-story, wooden shingle house located on the corner of Garden Street and Main Street in Sag Harbor. The main façade of the house features five symmetrically spaced bays with two windows flanking the uncovered front door on the first level, and five symmetrically spaced windows mirroring the ones below on the second level. The center portion of the house also has two evenly spaced chimneys, adding to the symmetrical look of the house. The house features two lean-to structures, one on the south side and one in the back. There is also an additional structure attached to the north side of the house.

=== Interior ===
The first floor of the Custom house is organized around a center stair hall located opposite the front door. A custom room and private parlor flank the center hall in the front, while a kitchen with two pantries in a lean-to, a dining room, and a rear staircase are located in the back. Connected to the custom room is another lean-to structure with an exterior entrance that originally functioned as the post office, making the entire south side of the house reserved for Dering's work. The opposite side of the house features a north wing that was once a freestanding structure and was later attached to the main house. It was likely used for additional work-related purposes such as storage for food or goods related to Dering's professional responsibilities. Today, the north wing serves as an apartment. Five bed chambers are located on the second floor.

== Alterations and restorations ==
=== Henry Packer Dering ===
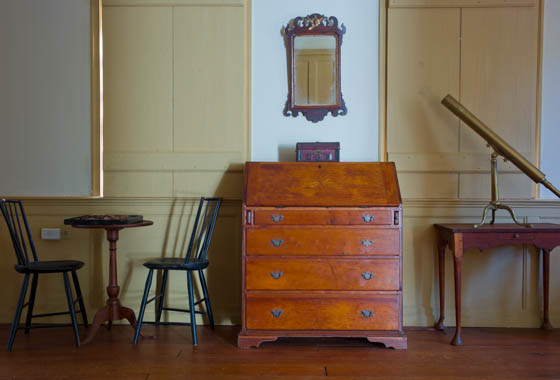
The custom room, used for professional matters by Henry Packer Dering.

The Custom House has undergone numerous alterations since its original construction circa 1770 as a “half house” featuring three bays with a front door on the right. As initially built, the interior included a side hall, parlor, and kitchen on the first floor, with the three bed chambers, one big and two small, on the second floor. Henry Packer Dering enlarged the house to accommodate his growing family. In 1794, he added a lean-to structure on the south side to serve as the post office. A year later, the building underwent a two-story addition. This extension included a new front parlor, a formal dining space, additional kitchen space in the rear, and bed chambers on the second floor. The ceiling was also raised in the first-floor addition. Lastly, the north wing of the house, which was once a freestanding structure, was attached to the main house, providing additional work and storage space.

=== The Old Sagg-Harbour Committee and SPLIA ===
Interest in the preservation of the Custom House emerged in 1944 when it caught the attention of Henry Triglar Weeks, founder of the Old Sagg-Harbour Committee, an organization devoted to finding, saving, and restoring old buildings in the Sag Harbor area. As the Custom House faced demolition, Weeks worked to save it, recruiting architects like Talbot Hamlin to express their support for its preservation. Finally in 1948, Weeks facilitated the gifting of the Custom House from St. Andrews Church to former Governor Charles Edison's Argonaut Enterprises. Edison provided the land for the Custom House's relocation as well as the funds to dig and build a new foundation. The house was subsequently moved from the corner of Church and Union Street to where it currently stands at the corner of Garden Street and Main Street. In 1955, the Old Sagg Harbour Committee became a non-profit museum and assumed ownership of the Custom House from Argonaut Enterprises, Inc. However, the organization struggled to raise the funds necessary to restore the Custom House in the way they envisioned. On May 2, 1966, the Custom House was given to The Society for the Preservation of Long Island Antiquities (SPLIA), now Preservation Long Island.

From 1969 to 1972, SPLIA engaged in a major effort to restore, research, and interpret the Custom House. During this time, paint samples were evaluated, wallpaper samples were dated, and various interior restorations were made. Historian Loring McMillen played an important role in this process, recommending the house be interpreted to the period of 1794 to 1810. In 1792, the Custom House reopened for public tours.

== Present ==
The Custom House is owned and stewarded by Preservation Long Island. In addition to giving tours, Preservation Long Island also holds on-site educational programs that explore maritime trade and the role of custom houses in the early United States.
