= Davis Ducart =

Irish architect and engineer

- Born: 1699; Piedmont, Italy
- Died: 1781 (aged 81–82); Drumrea, County Tyrone
- Occupation: Architect
- Buildings: Castletown Cox; Custom House, Limerick

Davis Ducart (active from c. 1761, died 1780/81), was an architect and engineer in Ireland in the 1760s and 1770s. He designed several large buildings and engineering projects. He had associations with the canal builders of the time and the mining industry and worked on many projects in the County Tyrone coalfield.

== Early life and identity ==
His origins are uncertain, but thought to be Piedmontese and/or Sardinian his original name was Daviso de Arcort. No relatives were mentioned in his will.

Richard Killeen (2012) states that Ducart was an architect from Sardinia.

== Major projects in Ireland ==
In the mid-1700s Ducart worked as an engineer on the Coalisland Canal (known as Dukart's Canal) and the Newry Canal which linked County Tyrone coalfields to further navigation at Coalisland. In Limerick Ducart produced the plan of plots to be leased in the Georgian extension of the city known as Newtown Pery and also those of the Custom House (1769), now home to the Hunt Museum.

== Other buildings ==
- Castletown Cox, County Kilkenny (1767)
- Brockley Park, County Laois (1768)
- Drishane House, County Cork.
- Kilshannig, County Cork (1765–66) - for Abraham Devonshire
- Lota Lodge, County Cork (1765)
- Mayoralty (or Mansion) House, Cork, County Cork (1766)
- Florence Court, County Fermanagh.
- Castlecore House, Ballymahon, County Longford
- Crosshaven House, Knocknagore, County Cork.
