= John Hunt (antiquarian) =

Irish historian, antiquarian and collector (1900–1976)

John Durrell Hunt
- Born: May 28, 1900; Watford, Hertfordshire, England
- Died: January 19, 1976 (aged 75); Howth, Dublin, Ireland
- Occupations: Antiquarian, antique dealer and archaeologist
- Spouse: Gertrude (née Hartmann)

John Durell Hunt (28 May 1900 – 19 January 1976) was a historian, antiquarian, and collector. Together with his wife Gertrude (née Hartmann), he amassed the Collection that today forms the basis of The Hunt Museum, Limerick, Ireland.

== Early life and education ==
John Durell Hunt ('Jack') was born in Watford, Herefordshire, England to John Hunt (c.1870–1929), architect, and Effie Jane Hunt (née Sherry). The eldest of five children, John attended King's College School, Cambridge and served two years of military service between 1918 and 1920 before training to become a doctor at St Bartholomew's Hospital.

== Career ==
He encouraged Lord Gort to restore Bunratty Castle. He is commemorated by a bust in the castle because of this. He also led to the creation of both the Craggaunowen and Lough Gur visitor centres through his interest in prehistory. The Hunts first settled at Lough Gur, near Limerick, and later in Dublin. In both these domestic settings, they housed and openly displayed their valuable collection.

== Personal life ==
John married Gertrude Hunt (née Hartmann) in London in 1933. They adopted two children, John Hunt, junior and Trudy Hunt, who were later trustees of the Hunt Museums Trust and directors of the Hunt Museum.
