= United States Custom House (New Orleans) =

Building in New Orleans, Louisiana

- U.S. National Register of Historic Places
- U.S. National Historic Landmark
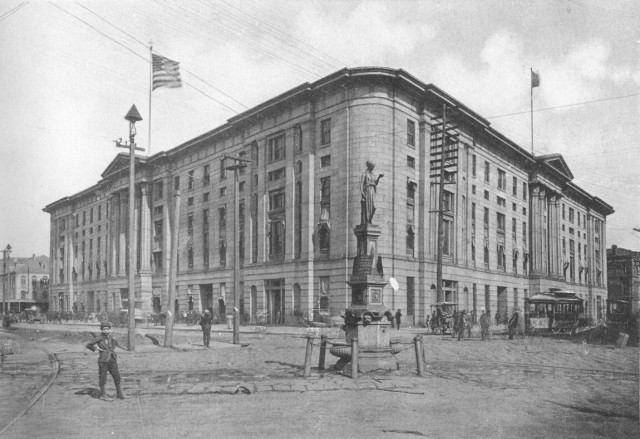
- View of the Custom House on Canal Street, 1892

- Location within East New Orleans Location within Louisiana Location within the United States
- Location: 423 Canal St., New Orleans, Louisiana
- Coordinates: 29°57′6.38″N 90°3′58.43″W
- Area: 2.3 acres (0.93 ha)
- Built: 1881
- Architect: Wood, Alexander Thompson; Et al.
- Architectural style: Egyptian Revival, Greek Revival
- NRHP reference No.: 74000938

Significant dates
- Added to NRHP: July 17, 1974
- Designated NHL: December 2, 1974

The U.S. Custom House, also known as the Old Post Office and Custom House, is a historic government building at 423 Canal Street in New Orleans, Louisiana. It was designated a National Historic Landmark, receiving this designation in 1974 and noted for its Egyptian Revival columns. Construction on the building, designed to house multiple federal offices and store goods, began in 1848 and didn't finish until 1881 due to redesigns and the American Civil War. The U.S. Customs offices have been located there since the late 19th century.

In 2008, it became home to the Audubon Insectarium, the largest free-standing American museum dedicated to insects. The Insectarium remained there until 2023, when it relocated to the Audubon Aquarium.

== Building history ==
The first customs house in New Orleans was designed by Benjamin Latrobe in 1809. The Latrobe building was replaced by a building that was started around 1819.

The current U.S. Custom House in New Orleans is one of the oldest and most important federal buildings in the Southern United States and one of the major works of architecture commissioned by the federal government in the 19th century. This monumental granite building was begun in 1848 and built over a period of 33 years. The grand Marble Hall in the center of the building is one of the finest Greek Revival interiors in the United States.

Located a few blocks from the Mississippi River, the great waterway that enabled New Orleans to become an important port city, the U.S. Custom House was planned in the 1840s in response to increasing trade through the Mississippi Valley. The building was also designed to accommodate other Federal offices, most notably the main post office and federal courts.

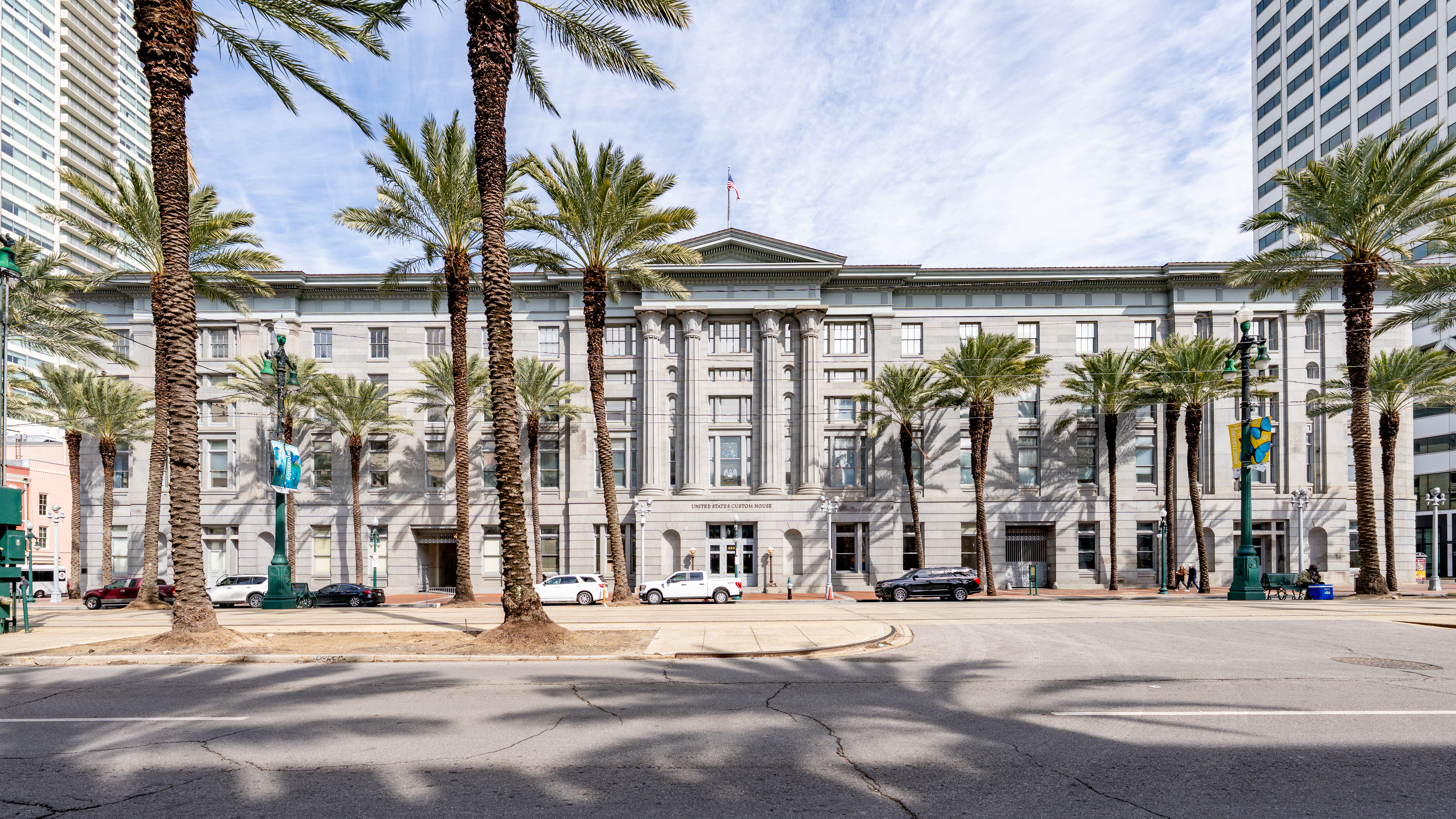
The Custom House in 2026

In 1847, the Treasury Department chose the design of Alexander Thompson Wood, and construction began in 1848. After Wood was replaced as architect in 1850, a succession of eight architects followed, each modifying the original design concept.

The partially completed building was first occupied in 1856 when the U.S. Customs Service moved into the first floor. The post office followed in November 1860, and the building served as the city's main post office through the remainder of the 19th century. Although construction was suspended during the Civil War, the building was occupied briefly by Confederate forces and then by the Union Army after New Orleans was occupied in 1862. It was also used to house captured Confederate soldiers, reportedly up to 2,000 men at one time.

Construction resumed in 1871, with the upper floor and roof plan and sections substantially revised under the direction of the Office of the Supervising Architect of the Treasury, Alfred B. Mullett (1834–1890), the designer of the Old Executive Office Building in Washington, DC, and many other federal buildings nationwide. Construction of the U.S. Custom House was completed in 1881.

In 1916, the building underwent major interior renovations following the move of the post office and courts to a new facility on Lafayette Square. Interior offices were subdivided and corridors reconfigured. Over the years, mechanical and electrical systems and suspended ceilings were added.

== Architecture ==
The impressive exterior of the U.S. Custom House retains its original design, which includes modified Greek and Egyptian Revival elements. The immense four-story building occupies the full trapezoidal downtown city block bounded by Canal, North Peters, Iberville, and Decatur Streets. Due to the shape of the lot, the corner of the building at Canal and North Peters Streets is rounded. The majority of the building is constructed of brick sheathed in gray granite from Quincy, Massachusetts; however, the entablature material is cast iron.

Each of the four facades is similar in design. In the center of each facade is a projecting pavilion consisting of four round, fluted, modified Egyptian, engaged columns. The first floor of the structure is faced with rusticated granite stonework. The cast-iron entablature contains widely spaced triglyphs (three vertical bands) in the frieze and dentils (small square blocks) in the cornice, and supports a triangular pediment above the central portico on each facade. Near both ends of each facade is a slightly projecting bay composed of four modified Egyptian pilasters supporting the entablature.

On the first story of the exterior of the U.S. Custom House are a series of blind (vacant) niches, six on each facade. The original architect intended these niches to hold heroic statues of famous Americans. When the plans for the exterior were later simplified, the idea of installing statuary was abandoned.

The floor plan of the U.S. Custom House is arranged around an impressive Greek Revival room known as the Marble Hall, one of the first such rooms in the country. This room is ornamented with Corinthian columns that depict the heads of the mythological god Mercury, guardian of boundaries, commerce, and roads, and the goddess Luna, whose crescent moon-shaped brow symbolizes the city's location at the crescent bend of the Mississippi River. The columns support a full classical entablature with an ornamented cornice and floral cresting. A deep cove above the cornice supports a sophisticated geometrically-composed skylight. Over the entrance at the North Peters Street end of the hall are sculptures depicting founder of New Orleans, Sieur de Bienville; General Andrew Jackson; and the pelican, the traditional symbol of Louisiana.

In 1916, the building underwent major renovations following the move of the post office and courts to a new facility on Lafayette Square. Recent GSA restoration efforts have successfully recaptured the historic appearance of the building, exposing original components such as vaulted ceilings and replicating missing or deteriorated interior elements and finishes, such as the skylight over the stairs.

== Significant events ==
- 1845: Congress appropriates $500 for the preparation of plans for a new U.S. Custom House and Construction begins.
- 1861: The start of the Civil War suspends construction of the U.S. Custom House and a temporary roof is put on the building.
- 1861–1865: During the war, the unfinished building is used to manufacture gun carriages for the Confederacy, as a Union headquarters, and as a Federal prison.
- 1871–1889: Under Supervising Architect of the Treasury Department Alfred B. Mullett, construction of the U.S. Custom House is completed.
- 1915–1916: The entire building is renovated.
- 1974: The U.S. Custom House is listed in the National Register of Historic Places and designated a National Historic Landmark.
- 1975–1976: Congress authorizes $6,732,000 for a major renovation, as a contribution to the country's Bicentennial.
- 1993: A G.S.A. rehabilitation and vacant-space-recapture project restores rooms and other interior elements to their pre-1916 condition.
- 2008: Becomes home to the Audubon Insectarium.

== Building facts ==
- Architect: Alexander T. Wood, principal
- Construction Dates: 1848–1881
- Landmark Status: National Historic Landmark
- Location: 423 Canal Street
- Architectural Style: Modified Greek/Egyptian Revival
- Primary Materials: Gray Massachusetts granite over a steel frame, with a cast-iron entablature
- Prominent Feature: Marble Hall

== Gallery ==
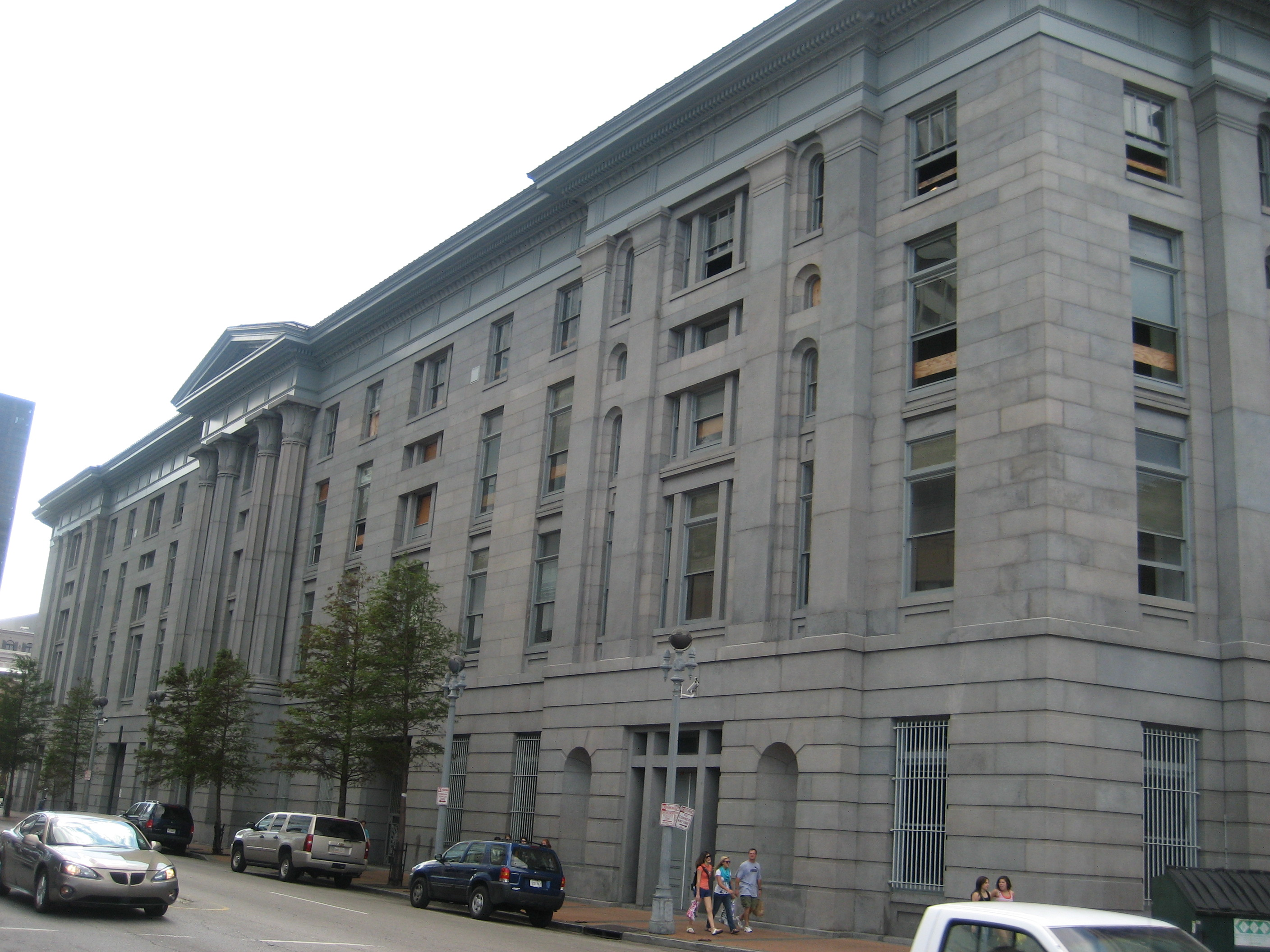
Custom House building, Decatur Street side, October 2008

== See also ==
- List of National Historic Landmarks in Louisiana
- National Register of Historic Places listings in Orleans Parish, Louisiana
- List of United States post offices
