= Audubon Insectarium =

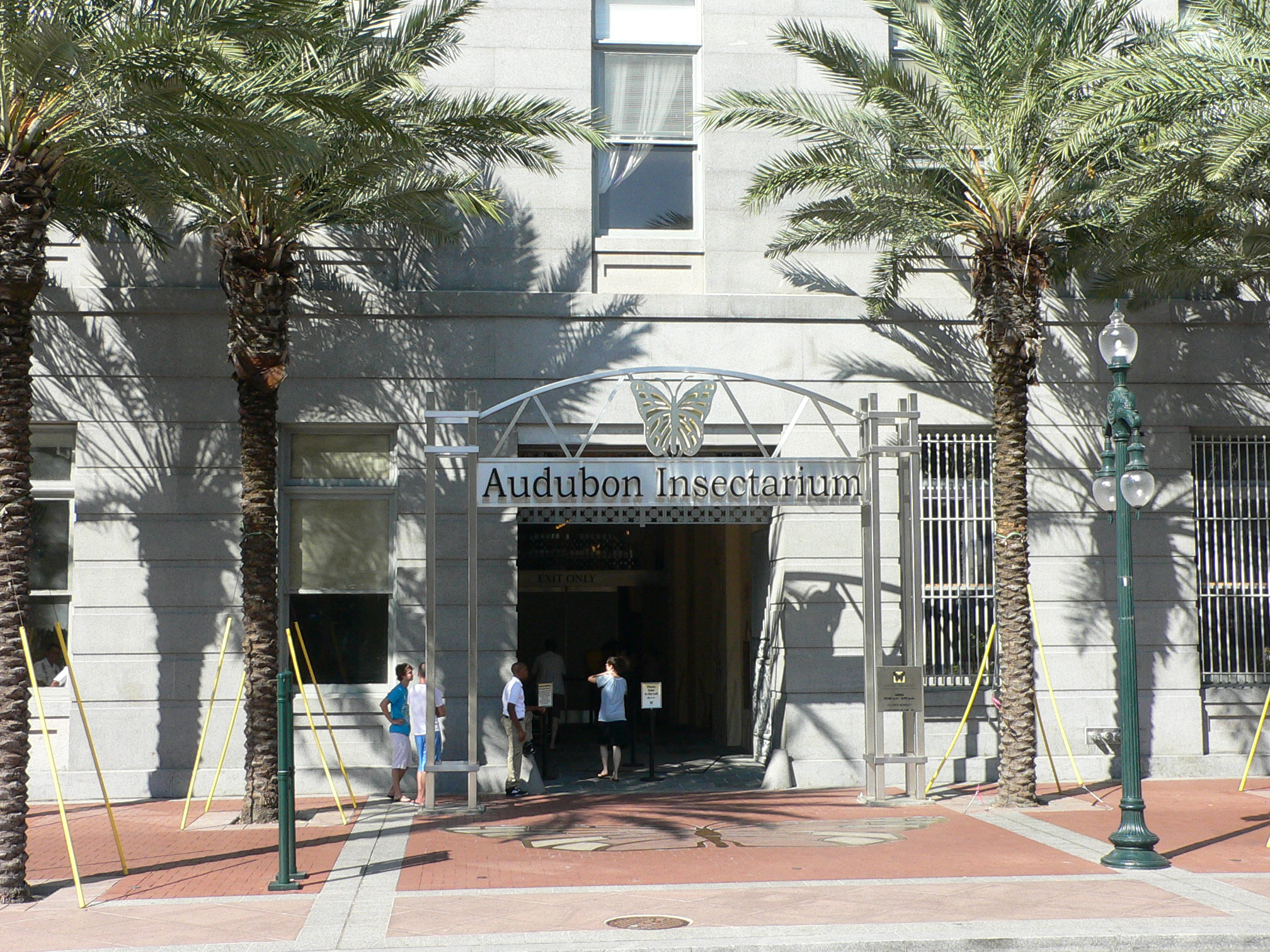
- Previous Main entrance, U.S. Custom House
- Interactive map of Audubon Insectarium
- 29.950012°N 90.063968°W
- Date opened: June 13, 2008
- Location: New Orleans, Louisiana, United States
- Floor space: 23,000 sq ft (2,100 m^{2})
- Website: audubonnatureinstitute.org/insectarium

The Audubon Insectarium is an insectarium and entomology museum in New Orleans, Louisiana, United States. As part of its move from its previous location at the U.S. Custom House Federal Building to the site of the Audubon Aquarium, the museum reopened on June 8, 2023.

The Insectarium opened on June 13, 2008. In 2009, it was awarded the Thea Award for Outstanding Achievement in a Science Center.

Part of the Audubon Nature Institute complex, it was located on the first floor of the U.S. Custom House Federal Building. With more than 50 live exhibits and numerous multimedia elements, the 23,000-square-foot (2,100 m^{2}) facility was the largest free-standing American museum dedicated to insects.

In September 2020, the Audubon Nature Institute announced the temporary closure of the Insectarium, owing to revenue shortages caused by the effects of the COVID-19 pandemic in the United States. Some of the Insectarium's exhibits will be relocated to space within the Aquarium.
