= Custom House, Belfast =

Historic building in Northern Ireland

Coordinates: 54.6017°N 5.9227°W

Custom House
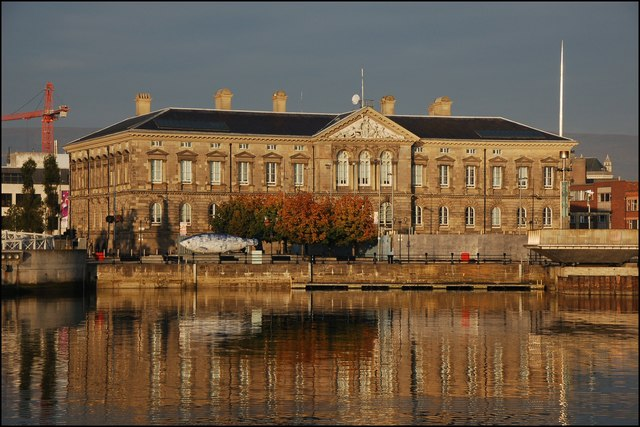
- Interactive map of the Custom House area

General information
- Architectural style: Palazzo
- Location: Belfast, Northern Ireland
- Construction started: 1854
- Completed: 1857
- Cost: £30,000

Design and construction
- Architect: Charles Lanyon

The Custom House is a 19th-century B+ listed building located in Belfast, Northern Ireland. Completed in 1857, the building has been used by various governmental departments, including the Belfast Board of Works, the Inland Revenue, and an Income Tax Office.

== History ==
Designed in 1847 by English architect Charles Lanyon, work on the actual building didn't begin until seven years later under construction firm D. & J. Fulton who finished in 1857 at a cost of £30,000.

Throughout the years the building has undergone numerous alterations with the first taking place just a few year after its completion. In 1861 the building's forecourt was raised to allow greater basement space and a Westward facing entrance was added. Again in 1872 the Southern entrance (then used as a Post Office) was removed and replaced with another Western entrance which was itself removed in 1886. Further changes were again carried out in 1926 when the interior of the central and Southern blocks were removed, a second floor was added above them and the building's original chimneys and Eastern entrance's portico were demolished. A new staircase was installed in the Northern block in 1940.

In 2001 under a PFI agreement HMRC transferred ownership of the building to private company Mapeley STEPS Ltd which was contracted to provide accommodation to HMRC up until 2021.

In 2022, Investment firm Straidorn Properties, headed by Co Antrim businessman Neil McKibbin, purchased and fully refurbished the building.
