= The Custom House, Limerick =

Georgian customs building in Limerick, Ireland

The Custom House
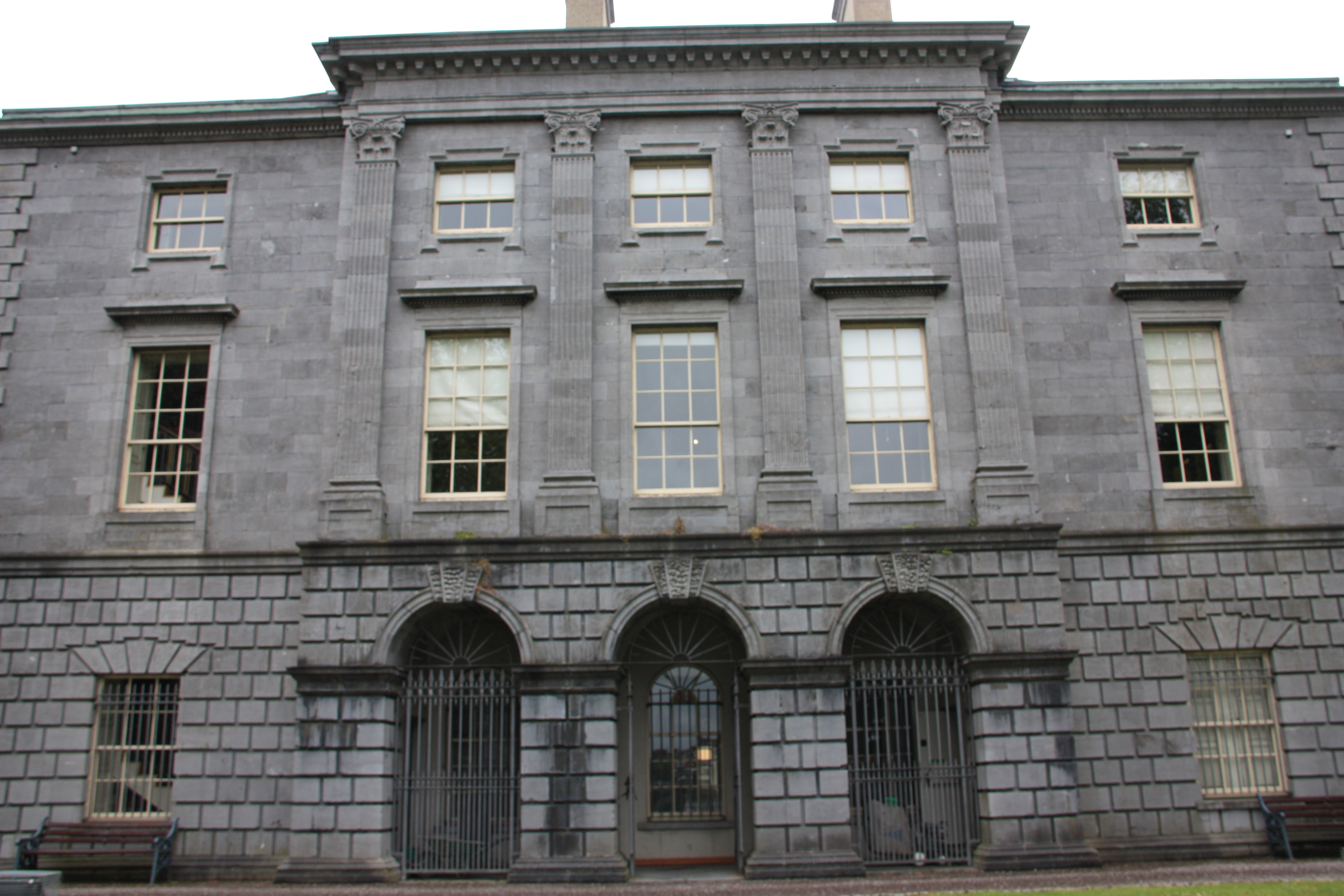
- Building façade

General information
- Status: Museum
- Type: House
- Architectural style: Palladian
- Location: Limerick, Ireland
- Coordinates: 52.6664°N 8.6242°W
- Groundbreaking: 1765
- Estimated completion: 1769
- Cost: £8,000

Technical details
- Material: limestone
- Floor count: 3 over basement

Design and construction
- Architect: Davis Ducart
- Developer: Edmund Pery, 1st Earl of Limerick
- Main contractor: Christopher Colles (Superintendent), Thomas Mark (contractor)

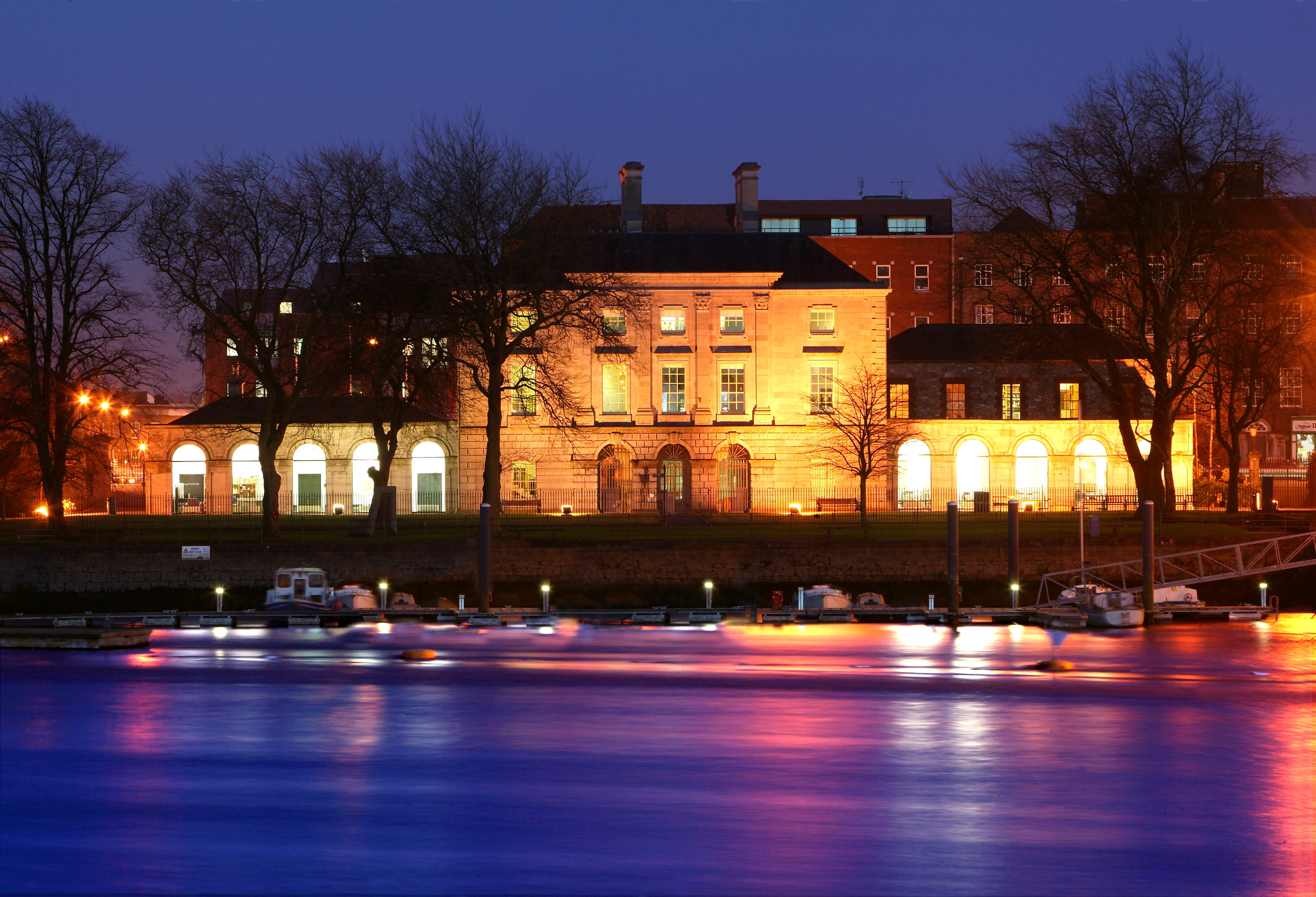
Custom house at night.

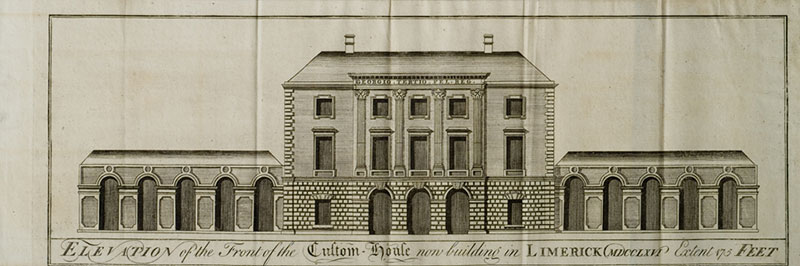
An illustration of the building from John Ferrar’s, A history of the city of Limerick (1767).

The Custom House is a Georgian-Palladian former custom house building in Limerick, Ireland. The building was constructed in local Irish limestone between 1765 and 1769 to a design by architect Davis Ducart and is situated on Rutland Street on the banks of the River Shannon at its confluence with the Abbey River.

As of 2023, the building houses the Hunt Museum.

== History ==
The site of the building was leased from merchant and Alderman, John Vincent by the Commissioners of Revenue under the direction of Edmund Pery, 1st Viscount Pery. The 1758 lease granted John Vincent the right to charge quayage to merchants' boats using the docks alongside the customs house.

The building was constructed by Christopher Colles as superintendent with the aid of contractor Thomas Mark to a design by the Italian architect Davis Ducart. The foundation stone was laid on 9 June 1765 and it is estimated that the complex cost about £8,000.

About half of the initial building was designed for residential use, with the arcaded wings designed for use by merchants and ships captains and clerks. One of the first collectors of revenue in the new building was Caleb Powell.

In 1783, Thomas Mark is recorded as erecting an additional building in matching limestone on the South side of the custom house yard while in 1824, James Pain is recorded as opening a new excise office within the grounds.

Later in 1807, a Board of Customs for Ireland was established and in 1823 this amalgamated with the Board of Customs for England and Wales and the Board of Customs for Scotland to create a single board across Britain and Ireland to which the local Customs office reported. The office's main responsibilities at that point became collecting taxes and customs revenue at its own port and to a lesser extent other work such as preventing smuggling.

In A Topographical Dictionary of Ireland, published by Samuel Lewis in 1837, the building is described as "a centre and two wings, built with hewn stone and handsomely ornamented".

In the 1840s, a post office was opened in the building and later from 1860, it was used partially as a probate court.

In 1882, an attempt was made to blow up the Custom House with dynamite however the plans were foiled before any explosion could take place.

The building was still used by the Customs and Excise service until 1993.

The Office of Public Works restored and refurbished the building in 1996 and it was reopened as the Hunt Museum on 14 February 1997.
