= Customs house agent =

Type of licensed agent in India

In India, a customs house agent (CHA) is licensed to act as an agent for transaction of any business relating to the entry or departure of conveyances or the import or export of goods at a customs station. CHAs maintain detailed, itemized and up-to-date accounts. A CHA license may be temporary or permanent.

== CHA licensing regulations, 1984 ==
1. No ceiling on the number of CHAs who may be appointed in a customs house
2. A regular licence is preceded by a temporary licence.
3. Criteria of experience and financial soundness must be met.
4. A regular licence is subject to passing an examination, A minimum volume of business and compliance with Regulation No. 14.
5. Changes in the constitution of a partnership or firm do not affect the operations of a CHA.
6. Prescribed fees prevent overbilling by CHAs.

== Qualifications ==
An applicant should:

- Hold a master's degree, Law, MBA/CMA/CA.
- Hold a pass in Form 'G' as an employee of the firm or company.
- Should have three years of experience in customs - clearance work.
- Should have bank-certified assets of Rs.5 lakhs.
- If there are more applicants than licenses, the Commissioner selects by seniority of holding a G pass. If two people have equal seniority, the older person will be preferred.

An applicant needs to possess a pass in Form G for only one year with written authorization from the Commissioner.

=== Clarifications ===
1. A diploma in Customs clearance and freight forwarding offered by the University of Mumbai is not considered as "graduation" for the purpose of eligibility.
2. An employee, partner or director of a CHA licensee authorized for examination under Regulation 9(5) may take three examinations in two years from the date of application by the licensee for examination.
3. The level of knowledge of the local language must be determined by the Commissioners; the Regulations have no requirement. Knowledge of the local language by an authorized representative is considered sufficient. Proficiency in Hindi is desirable.
4. A person passing an examination under Regulation 9(5) may apply for a CHA license when applications are requested, subject to other qualifications.
5. Persons granted CHA licenses before the 1997 amendment requiring graduation would continue to qualify for renewal.

== Multimodal transport operators as CHAs ==
Multimodal transport operators (MTOs) are appointed under the Multimodal Goods Transportation Act, 1993 by the Ministry of Surface Transport. Their work involves carrying goods by more than one mode of transport between India and abroad. This does not confer a right on them to obtain an appointment as steamer agents or CHAs unless they are otherwise qualified for the appointment.

== Licence types ==
=== Temporary ===
After accepting an application, a one-year temporary licence is granted under Regulation 8 in Form B. Before receiving a temporary (or regular) licence, the applicant must execute a bond on Forms D and E. For major ports, the surety amount is Rs.25000/; for other ports, Rs.10000/. Surety may also be given in the form of National Savings Certificates or postal security, which should be pledged in the name of the Commissioner. Since a regular licence-holder is allowed to work in more than one Customs station, separate bond and surety must be posted for each customs station.

=== Regular ===
An application for regular licence may be made on Form C by a person who has passed the examinations. Forms A and C are nearly identical, except that while the former is issued under Regulation 5, the latter form is issued under Regulation 10. A regular licence is requested on Form D. The applicant must satisfy the following conditions:

1. Quantity or value norms of cargo cleared from the customs house (as determined by the Commissioner)
2. Applicant conduct during the temporary-licence period; no complaints of non-compliance with Regulation 14

A regular licence is nontransferable, and its term is ten years.

=== Disqualifications ===
Regulation 10(1) specifies that only a person who qualifies in the examination can apply for a regular licence. Sub-regulation 3 provides that the Commissioner may reject the application of a person who fails the examination. If performance criteria are not satisfied regarding quantity and value of clearances or conduct, the application may be rejected. An appeal may be made of an order of rejection within 30 days to the Chief Commissioner, who is also empowered to review regular licence grants within one year.16915032

These Customs House Agents act on behalf of you with customs officials to undergo necessary export and import clearance procedures and formalities. In an export, a customs broker delivers documents to exporter after completing necessary export formalities with customs. In an import trade, goods are delivered to importer by customs broker after completing necessary import customs clearance procedures and formalities with custom department.

== Record-keeping ==
Accounts should reflect all financial transactions entered into as a CHA. A copy of all documents filed (such as shipping bills, bills of entry and transshipment applications) must be maintained for at least five years and should be available for inspection by departmental officers.

== Duties ==
- Authorised clearances only against authorization: A CHA is required to clear goods for import or export with specific authorization from the principal, which must be produced whenever required by the Deputy or Assistant Commissioner.
- Personal clearance: The CHA must personally clear the goods or clear them through an employee designated by the Commissioner. All documents should list the CHA's name at the top. The CHA should not attempt to influence the conduct of customs officers in matters pending before him or his subordinates; there should be no threats, false accusations or duress against such officers, and no promise of advantage, benefit or gift should be made or bestowed on such officers. The CHA's duties should be discharged expeditiously, and he cannot charge more than the rates approved by the Commissioner.
- Conflicts of interest: If the CHA is a former officer of a department, he cannot represent any matter before a customs officer which he had considered as an officer. He cannot use facts which came to his knowledge as an officer.
- Correct advice: The CHA must advise the client to comply with the provisions of the Act and the regulations, diligently ensuring the imparting of correct, relevant information to the client for clearance of cargo or baggage. If there is non-compliance by a client, the CHA must bring it to the attention of the deputy or assistant commissioner. This regulation requires the CHA to provide information to the department.
- Fiscal accountability: The CHA must promptly pay the government all money received from the client for duties and taxes. Any money received from the client or from the government should be promptly and fully accounted to the client.

Record-keeping: A CHA should not attempt to gather information from government records if they are not provided by the appropriate officer. Access to records should not be denied, removed or concealed when sought by the Commissioner. Records and accounts must be maintained as directed by the Deputy or Assistant Commissioner, and available for inspection. All documents must be prepared in accordance with rules and orders.

If the licence granted to a CHA is lost, the loss should be promptly reported to the Commissioner. If there is failure in compliance with obligations under Regulation 14, the Commissioner may prohibit a person from acting as a CHA.

== Handling changes ==
Any change in partners or directors should be referred to the Commissioner. If there is a change in the constitution of the firm or company, an application for temporary and regular licences should be made within 30 days of the change. If there are no adverse findings against the firm or company, the Commissioner will grant a licence in the previous category held by the firm or company. In the meantime, the firm may continue as a CHA with application to the Commissioner.

If the CHA is not a firm or company, the Commissioner will grant permission to continue as a CHA if there is any change in the constitution of the concern. If the change is due to the death of a licensed CHA, his legal heir (assisting him in his work as CHA under Regulation 20) may be granted a licence subject to no adverse findings and passage of the examination. Changes in the qualified person acting on behalf of the firm or company should be immediately provided to the Deputy or Assistant Commissioner.

== Information technology ==
The National Informatics Centre (NIC) has developed basic software to create and file shipping bills (Customs documents) on the Indian Customs website. The software is free to download with IceGate (Indian Customs) registration.
