= Custom house =

Government office building for import and export of goods

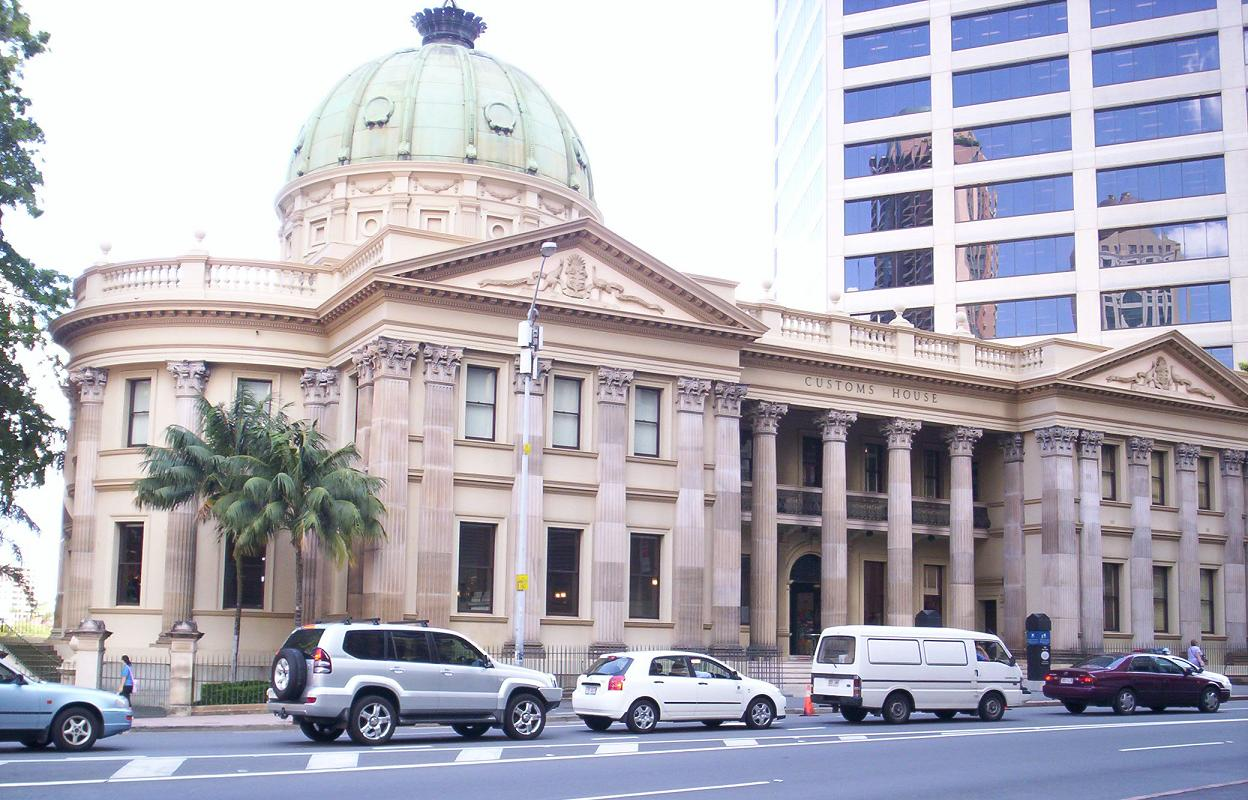
The Customs House in Brisbane, Australia

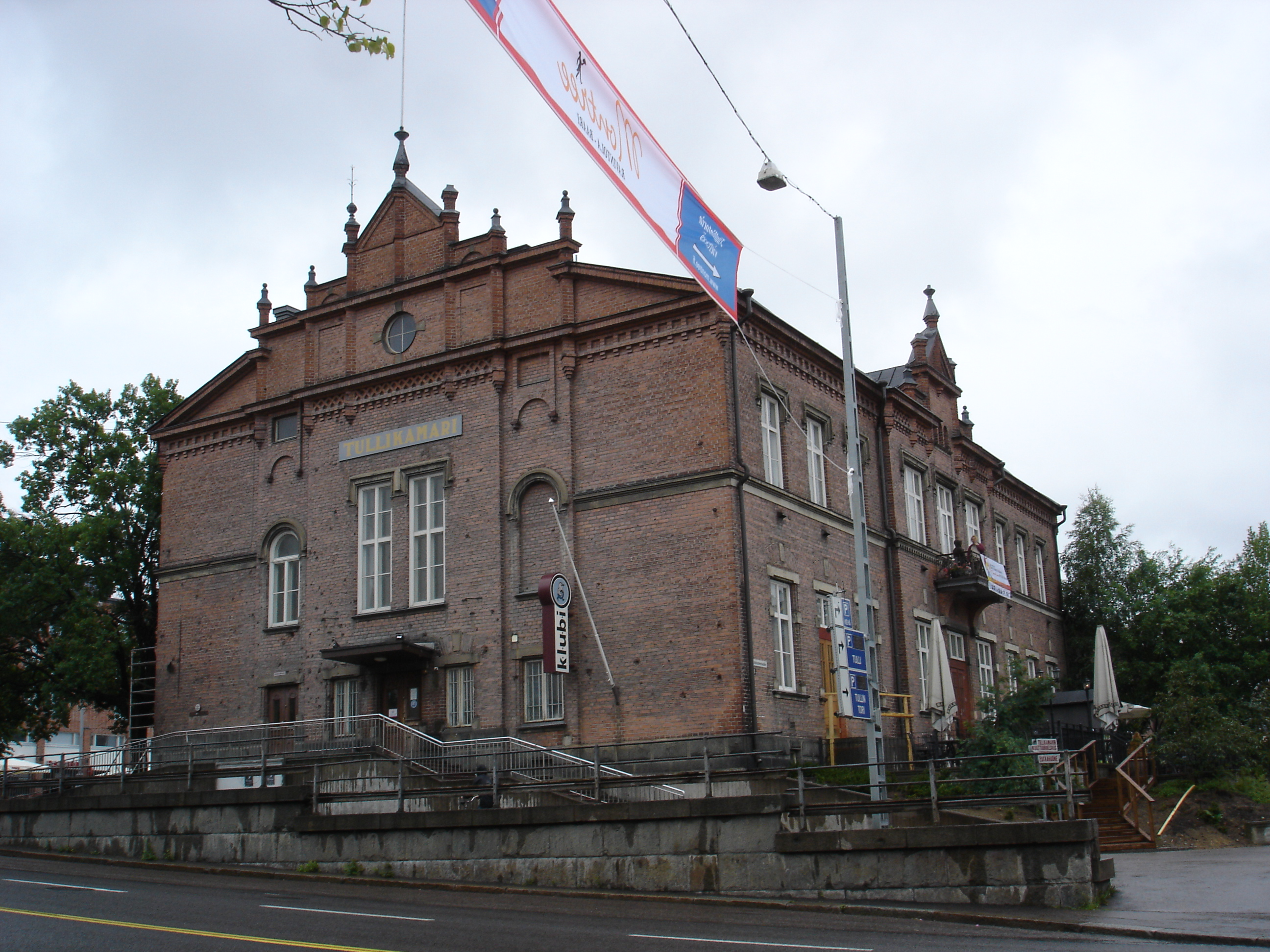
The Old Customs House in Tampere, Finland

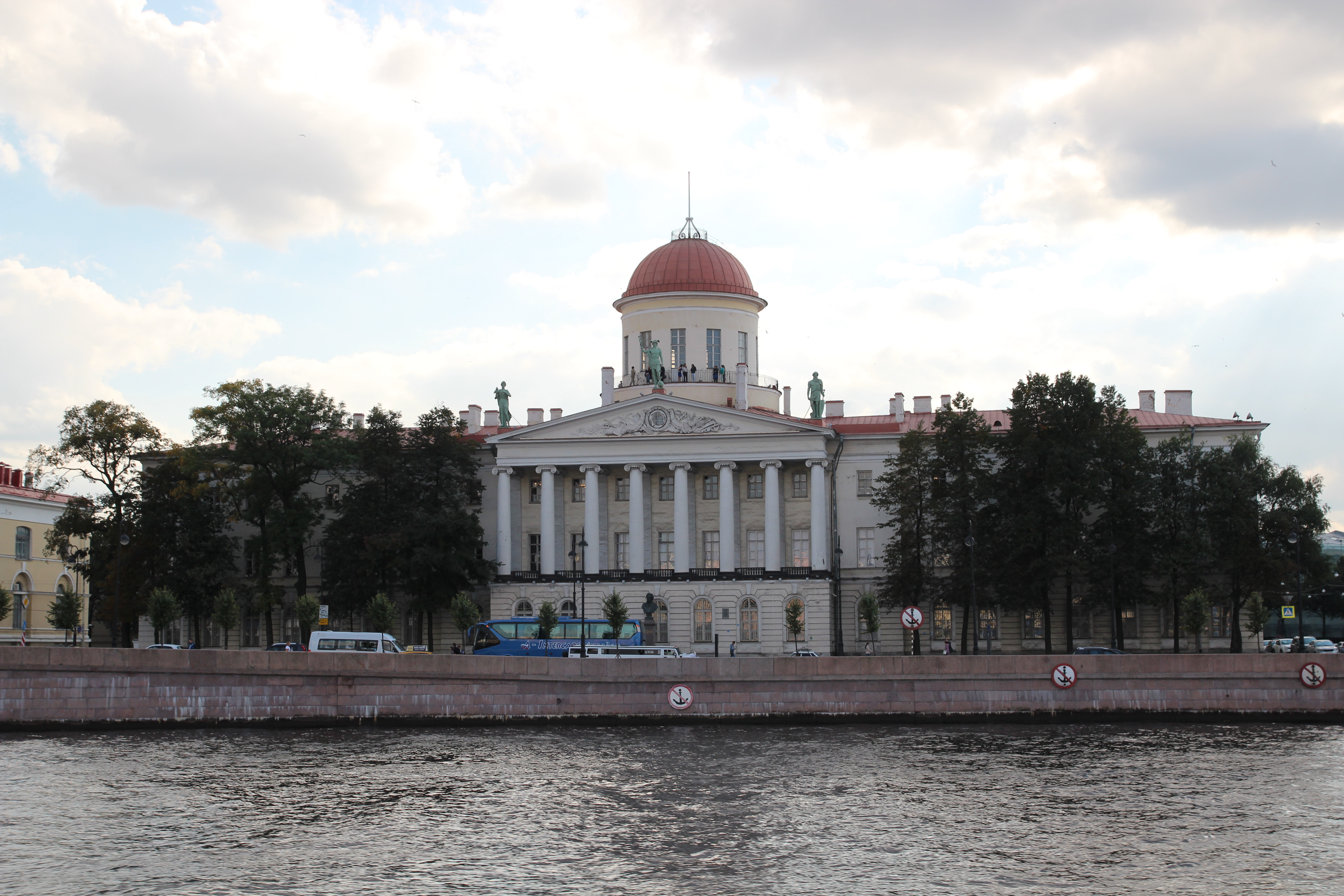
The Custom House, Saint Petersburg

A custom house or customs house was traditionally a building housing the offices for a jurisdictional government whose officials oversaw the functions associated with importing and exporting goods into and out of a country, such as collecting customs duty on imported goods. A custom house was typically located in a seaport or in a city on a major river, with access to an ocean. These cities acted as ports of entry into a country.

Due to advances in electronic information systems, the increased volume of international trade, and the introduction of air travel, custom houses have largely become obsolete. Many custom houses around the world have since been converted for other uses, such as museums or civic buildings.

As examples, the former Alexander Hamilton U.S. Custom House in Manhattan, New York, (now the George Gustav Heye Center) presently houses a branch of the National Museum of the American Indian, the former U.S. Custom House in New Orleans, Louisiana, is now home to the Audubon Butterfly Garden and Insectarium, the former U.S. Custom House in San Francisco, California, now houses offices of the U.S. Customs and Border Protection and Social Security Administration and the former U.S. Custom House in Baltimore, Maryland, was in 1973 serving as a Selective Service office. As of 2019, the Custom House of Valletta in Malta was still being used for its original purpose.

== History ==
Custom Houses became a prominent feature of English ports after 1275, following the creation of a national system for collecting duties on overseas trade.

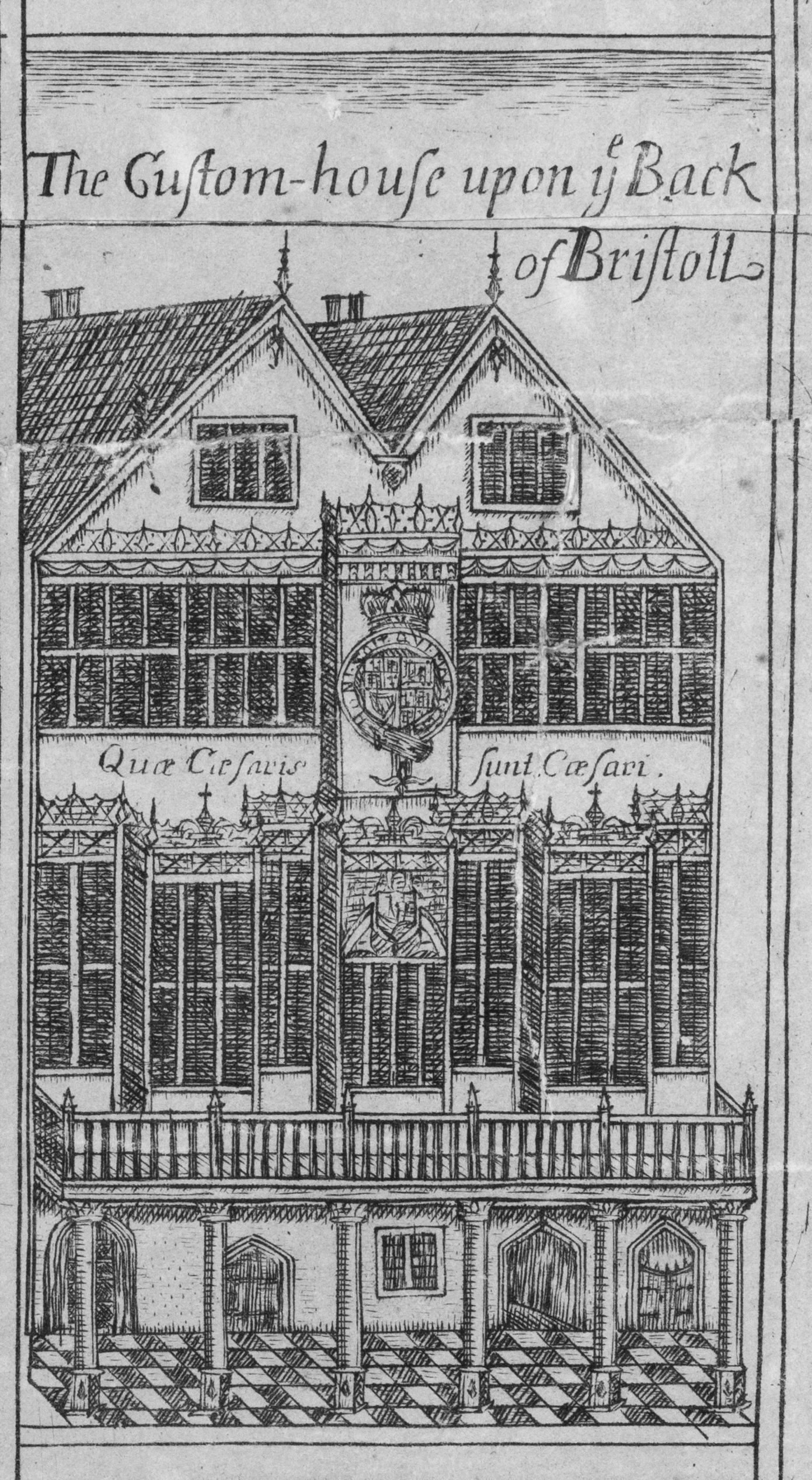
The Custom-house upon the Back of Bristoll (1728)

In the United Kingdom, since 1386, the phrase "custom house" has been in use over the term "customs house". This was after the City of London's Custom House was erected at Wool Wharf in Tower Ward, to house just the officials overseeing the Great Custom on Wool and Woolfells. The singular form was used even though in later years the City of London's Custom House served as the workplace for other customs officials as well.

== See also ==
- Customs broking
