= Midlands Gateway =

Logo of the Midlands Gateway

Midlands Gateway, also known as Lake-Counties Gateway, is an area centered between the Irish airports of Dublin, Shannon, and Knock. The principal urban centres in the Midlands Gateway include Athlone, Tullamore and Mullingar. The background to the Midlands Gateway project was the Irish government's National Spatial Strategy, launched in 2002. The counties covered in the plan include County Offaly and County Westmeath.

Midlands or Lake-Counties Gateway

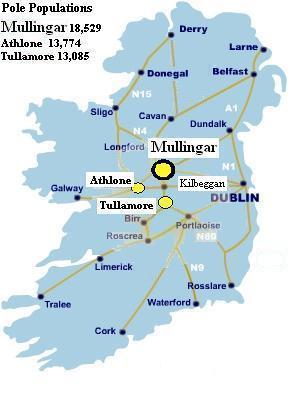
Midlands Gateway & Tri-Pole Populations

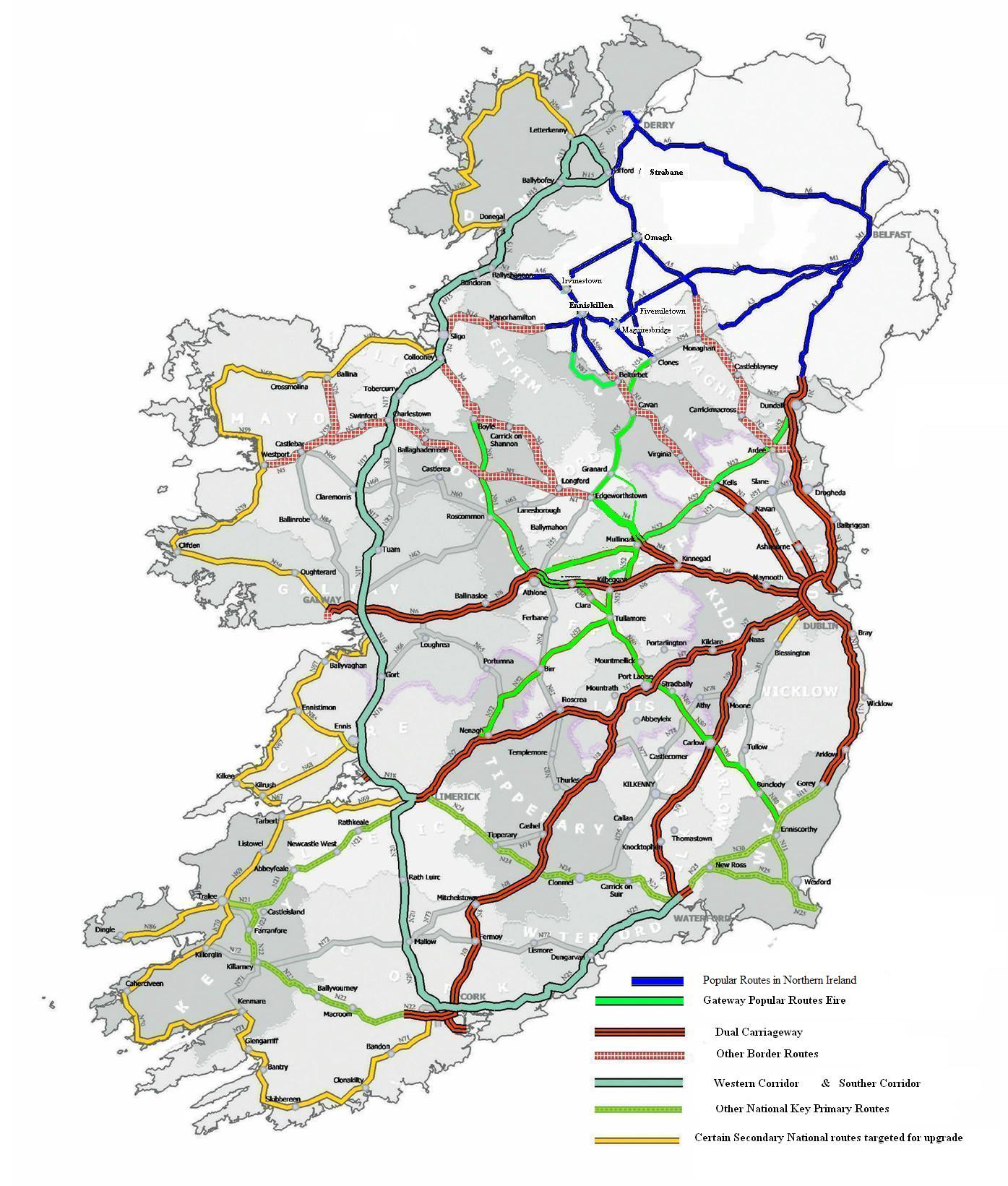
Midlands Gateway Popular Routes

== Objective ==
The strategy is designed to create an integrated linked Gateway comprising Athlone, Tullamore and Mullingar together with the other surrounding towns in the region with the objective of developing an "internationally competitive Gateway".

The Irish government strategy, combined with the associated councils has been formulated with the intention of ensuring the availability of choice in residential, retail, leisure and tourist facilities based on the principles of quality of life and environmental enhancement.

== Background ==
The background to the Midlands Gateway project is the Irish government's National Spatial Strategy, which was launched in 2002 with the objective of engendering a "more balanced approach to regional development across the State".

The purpose of this strategic framework is to focus more directly on the role of the Midlands Gateway within this strategy in acting as the economic driving force for the development of the Midlands region.

== Goals ==
In order to ensure that the vision for the Midlands Gateway is achieved, a number of partners were identified as of importance to the Midlands gateway's success. These included a number of Government departments, the Industrial Development Authority (Ireland), National Roads Authority NRA, Higher Education Authority (HEA), Science Foundation Ireland (SFI) and local agencies.

Currently, the Gateway does not have direct access to complete Inter-Urban Motorways/Dual-Carriageways, both internally and externally. The Gateway, and in particular the three principal Gateway towns of Athlone, Tullamore and Mullingar, is served by main line inter-urban rail and bus networks, with direct access to urban centres of Dublin, Galway and Sligo, and limited local bus services. However, there is poor rail connection within the gateway.

In addition, the Gateway is not directly served by an inland port and, of critical importance, is not currently within one hour drive time of an international airport. There is poor road linkage between the Gateways towns, with limited rail and bus service links. If developed as proposed, the road development proposals announced in the Transport 21 Government Proposal (November 2005) would mean that the Midlands Gateway would attain improved access to Galway, Dublin and Sligo, and therefore also to ports and airports. The plan also identified a need to "considerably improve the road infrastructure within and adjacent to the Gateway", as the "existing status is significantly insufficient".

== Report ==
A report by Indecon concluded that the "scale of the economic challenges facing the Midlands Gateway is very large". The analysis in the Strategic development Framework for the Midlands Gateway report highlighted the following challenges:

- The absence of a critical mass of population, employment, and infrastructure in the Gateway;
- The extremely low levels of value-added services and productivity in the existing manufacturing base in the region, which leaves the Gateway vulnerable to significant further job losses;
- The persistence of socio-economic barriers, including noticeably higher unemployment, lower educational attainment, and social deprivation/exclusion in certain areas in the Midlands counties;
- The failure of the region to capture a higher share of tourism activity and to develop higher value tourism product areas; and
- The absence of a strong, identifiable 'brand' for the Midlands Gateway, which gives the Gateway and surrounding region strong visibility as an attractive location for live and work.
- The reporters Simpson and Associates, strongly believe that unless the strategies recommended in this report are implemented, the potential for the area to develop as a significant Gateway is limited and this, like all the other elements of the (original National Spatial Strategy), now called the National Development Plan, would remain aspirational.
- If, however, the recommendations in this report are implemented, we believe there is a real opportunity for significant progress to be made.

== See also ==
- Irish National Development Plan
- Platform 11
- Transport 21
