= History of rail transport in Ireland =

Ireland's extensive rail network was largely dismantled during the 20th century.

1906 Viceregal Commission rail map of Ireland

The history of rail transport in Ireland began only a decade later than that of Great Britain. By its peak in 1920, Ireland had 3,500 route miles (5,630 km). The current status is less than half that amount, with a large unserviced area around the border area between Northern Ireland and the Republic of Ireland.

Railways on the island of Ireland are run by Iarnród Éireann (Irish Rail) within Ireland and Northern Ireland Railways within Northern Ireland. The two companies jointly operate the island's only cross-border service, the Enterprise, between Dublin and Belfast. The Railway Preservation Society of Ireland based in Whitehead, County Antrim runs preserved steam trains on the main line, with the Irish Traction Group preserving diesel locomotives, and operating on the main line. The Downpatrick and County Down Railway is the only self-contained full-size heritage railway in the island of Ireland.

== Transport before railways ==
Transport on a country-wide scale began in 1710 with the introduction by the General Post Office of mail coaches on the main routes between towns. Private operators added to the routes, and an established "turnpike" road system started in the 1730s. In 1715 the Irish Parliament took steps to encourage inland navigation, but it was not until 1779 that the first 19 km (12 mi) section of the Grand Canal was opened. The addition of the Royal Canal and river navigation (particularly on the River Shannon) meant that freight could be transported more easily. Charles Bianconi established his horse-car services in the south in 1815, the first of many such passenger-carrying operations. Despite these improvements huge areas of Ireland still relied on a basic road system; turnpikes were still slow and canals were expensive.

== Ireland's first railway ==
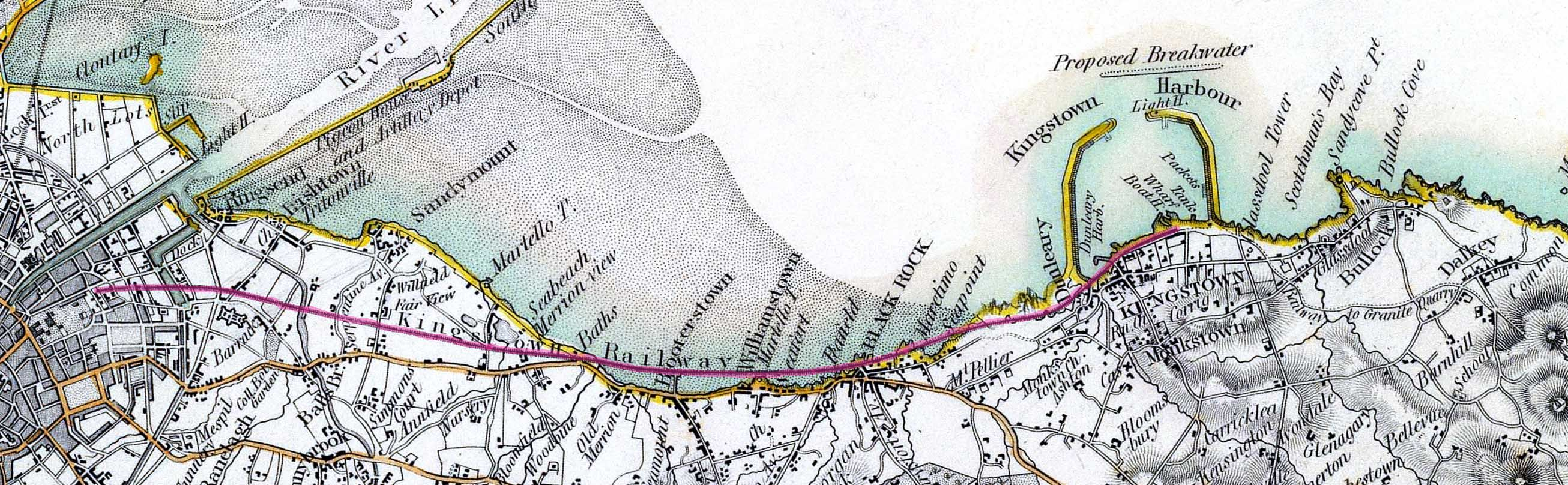
The Dublin and Kingstown line in 1837

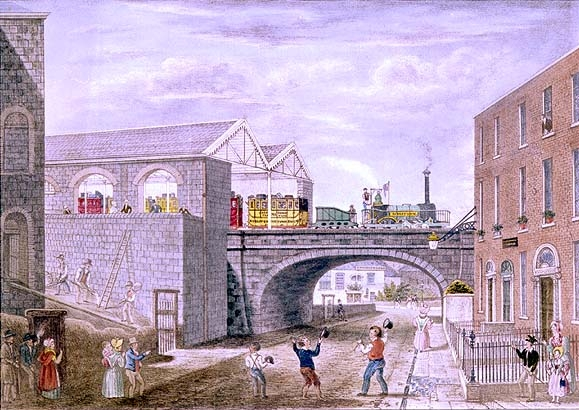
Dublin and Kingstown Railway, by John Harris

Although a railway between Limerick and Waterford had been authorised as early as 1826 (the same year as Britain's first exclusively locomotive-drawn line, the Liverpool and Manchester Railway) it was not until 1834 that the first railway was built, the Dublin and Kingstown Railway (D&KR) between Westland Row in Dublin and Kingstown (Dún Laoghaire), a distance of 10 km (6 mi). Due to local opposition the first terminus, Kingstown Harbour, was adjacent to the West Pier. It took a further three years before the line reached the site of the present station. The contractor was William Dargan, called "the founder of railways in Ireland", due to his participation in many of the main routes. The D&KR was notable in being the earliest dedicated commuter railway in the world. The planning undertaken was also noteworthy: a full survey of the existing road traffic was made, in addition to careful land surveys.

As well as the traffic survey showing existing volumes to be healthy, there was the potential from the ever-expanding port at Kingstown. On 9 October 1834 the locomotive Hibernia brought a train the full route from the Westland Row terminus (now Dublin Pearse) to Kingstown. The railway was built to 1,435 mm (4 ft 8 1/2 in) standard gauge.

The entire route forms part of the present day Dublin Area Rapid Transit electrified commuter rail system.

== Railway gauges ==
The track gauge adopted by the mainline railways is 5 ft 3 in, or "Irish gauge". This unusual gauge is otherwise found only in the Australian states of Victoria, southern New South Wales (as part of the Victorian rail network) and South Australia (where it was introduced by the Irish railway engineer F. W. Sheilds), and in Brazil.

The first three railways in Ireland all had different gauges: the Dublin and Kingstown Railway used 4 ft 8 1/2 in (1,435 mm) "Stephenson gauge" (then the dominant gauge in England, Scotland, and Wales, but not yet the legal standard in those countries or worldwide as it would later be); the Ulster Railway used a very broad gauge of 6 ft 2 in (1,880 mm); and the Dublin and Drogheda Railway used the less-broad 5 ft 2 in (1,575 mm) gauge. Following complaints from the Ulster Railway, the Board of Trade investigated the matter, and in 1843 recommended the use of 5 ft 3 in (1,600 mm) and that compensation be paid to the Ulster Railway for the costs incurred in changing to the new gauge.

== Main line railways ==
Map of Irish railway companies at the system's height (c. 1923)

The networks of the six largest Irish railway companies before the creation of Great Southern Railways. (Note: This includes railways that were worked by these companies, but not owned by them. For details see the map on each company's page.) Great Southern and Western Railway Great Northern Railway Midland Great Western Railway Northern Counties Committee Dublin and South Eastern Railway County Donegal Railways Joint Committee Other minor companies (click line for name)

By the beginning of the 20th century, the main line railways were:

=== Belfast and County Down Railway ===
The Belfast and County Down Railway (B&CDR) linked Belfast south-eastwards into County Down. It was incorporated in 1846; the first section opened in 1848; absorbed into the Ulster Transport Authority in 1948 and all but the line to Bangor closed in 1950.

=== Cork, Bandon and South Coast Railway ===
The Cork, Bandon and South Coast Railway (CB&SCR) was one of the major Irish railways; incorporated 1845, the first section opened 1851. It operated from Cork, serving towns along the southern coastal strip to the west of the city. It had a route length of 150 km (93.75 mi), all single line. The Railway was largely concerned with tourist traffic, and there were many road car routes connecting with the line, including one from Bantry to Killarney called The Prince of Wales Route, which operated at the beginning of the 20th century.

The Clonakilty Extension Railway 14 km (8.75 mi), opened 1886, was worked by the CB&SCR

=== County Donegal Railways Joint Committee ===
The County Donegal Railways Joint Committee (CDRJC) operated in north-west Ireland during the 20th century. The parent line opened 1863, 178 km (111 mi) (narrow gauge). It was incorporated by an Act of Parliament in 1906 which authorised the joint purchase of the Donegal Railway Company by the Great Northern Railway of Ireland and the Midland Railway Northern Counties Committee.

The Strabane and Letterkenny Railway 31 km (19.5 mi), opened 1909, was worked by the CDRJC

=== Dublin and South Eastern Railway ===
The Dublin and South Eastern Railway (D&SER) was originally incorporated, by Act of Parliament in 1846, as the Waterford, Wexford, Wicklow and Dublin Railway Company; incorporated 1846, the first section opened 1856. It was known more simply as the Dublin, Wicklow and Wexford Railway Company between 1860 and 31 December 1906 when it became the DSE. Amongst the lines forming the DSE were:

- The Dublin and Kingstown Railway authorised 1831, it opened in 1834 – the first public railway in Ireland. The Kingstown-Dalkey section was operated by atmospheric traction for a short while. The railway formed part of the Royal Mail route between London and Dublin via the packet station at Kingstown (now Dún Laoghaire).
- The City of Dublin Junction Railway 2 km (1.25 mi), opened 1 May 1891, the Dublin and Kingstown Railway 10 km (6 mi); opened 1834, and the New Ross and Waterford Extension Railway 22 km (13.5 mi); opened 1904 were all worked by the D&SER.

=== Great Northern Railway of Ireland ===
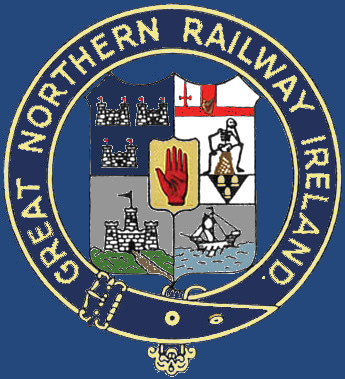
The coat of arms of the GNR

The route of the Great Northern Railway of Ireland (GNR(I)), which exists today from Dublin to Belfast and Drogheda to Navan, emerged, like so many others of the former major railway companies in Ireland, as the result of many amalgamations with smaller lines. The earliest dates of incorporation were for:

- the Ulster Railway, the second railway project to start in Ireland, incorporated May 1836, partially opened 1839; it was originally constructed to a gauge of 6 ft 2 in (1,880 mm), but was later altered, under protest, to the new 5 ft 3 in (1,600 mm). The companies forming the Dublin to Belfast line and those connecting to it were obliged to contribute part of this cost.
- the Dublin and Drogheda Railway (D&D), also incorporated 1839, opened in 1844.
- the Irish North Western Railway (INWR), incorporated in 1862 in a merger between the Dundalk and Enniskillen Railway and the Londonderry and Enniskillen Railway, operated from Dundalk and Portadown via Enniskillen and Omagh to Derry.
- the Dublin and Belfast Junction Railway (D&BJct), incorporated in 1845 and opened in stages between 1849 and 1853.

In 1875, the D&D and the D&BJct merged to form the Northern Railway of Ireland and thirteen months later the Great Northern Railway (Ireland) (GNR(I)) was formed when the Ulster Railway and the INWR joined this concern. Other minor railways were subsequently taken over. At its height, in the thirty or so years prior to World War I, the GNR(I) covered a large area of Ireland between Dublin, Belfast, Derry and Bundoran. By the end of World War II the company was in dire straits. It struggled on until 1953 when it was nationalised by the two Governments, becoming the Great Northern Railway Board.

In 1957, the Government of Northern Ireland unilaterally ordered the GNRB to close most of their lines west of the River Bann within Northern Ireland. This left some useless stubs within the Republic, such as through Pettigo station; 13 km (8 mi) from the border to Bundoran and Monaghan to Glaslough. The Irish Government had no choice but to abandon these stubs. The one exception, which survived until 1965, was the line from Portadown to Derry via Dungannon and Omagh.

The GNRB was abolished on 1 October 1958, when it was split between the Ulster Transport Authority and Córas Iompair Éireann in Northern Ireland and the Republic, respectively. This gave rise to the interesting situation whereby part of the line between Strabane and Derry was in the Republic of Ireland and the stations and permanent way staff on this section were CIÉ employees, even though there was no physical link to the rest of the CIÉ rail network.

The Castleblayney, Keady and Armagh Railway 29 km (18.25 mi), opened in 1909 was worked by the GNR(I)

=== Great Southern & Western Railway ===
Still known today as the 'premier line', the Great Southern & Western Railway (GS&WR) was the largest railway system in Ireland. It began as a railway incorporated to connect Dublin with Cashel – incorporated 6 August 1844 – and which was afterwards extended to the city of Cork. While the Cashel line became a branch between Thurles and Limerick Junction. Various other amalgamations took place until the end of the 19th century, among them lines to Limerick and Waterford.

In 1900, as a result of Acts of Parliament, several important lines became part of the GS&WR system, including the Waterford & Central Ireland Railway and the Waterford, Limerick and Western Railway. The latter connected Sligo to Limerick. The Railway also connected with the Midland Great Western Railway main line at Athlone on its Dublin–Galway main line.

The Athenry and Tuam Extension Light Railway 27 km (17 mi), Baltimore Extension Light Railway 13 km (8 mi), Tralee and Fenit Railway 13 km (8 mi); opened 1887 and Waterford, New Ross and Wexford Junction Railway 5 km (3.25 mi) (leased from D&SER) were worked by the Great Southern & Western Railway.

=== Midland Great Western Railway ===
The Midland Great Western Railway (MGWR) was incorporated in 1845 to build a line parallel to the Royal Canal between Dublin and Longford. They would branch off this line to complete a main line to Galway, and would expand their network in the following years to span an area between Dublin, Clifden and Sligo.

Both the Ballinrobe and Claremorris Railway 19 km (12 mi), opened 1892 and the Loughrea and Attymon Light Railway 14 km (9 mi), opened 1890 were worked by the Midland Great Western.

=== Northern Counties Committee ===
The Northern Counties Committee (Midland Railway) was an amalgamation of the Midland Railway with the Belfast and Northern Counties Railway which was formed on 1 July 1903.

Additionally, the Carrickfergus Harbour Junction Light Railway 2 km (1 mi); was incorporated in 1882, opening in 1887 and was worked by the Northern Counties Committee.

== Other railways ==
The state of the rail network in the island of Ireland in 1906

=== Independent railways ===
- Ballycastle Railway 26 km (16.25 mi) (914 mm or 3 ft gauge); incorporated 1878, opened 1880; four locomotives, 74 other vehicles
- Bessbrook and Newry Tramway (electric) 3 miles (5 km) (914 mm gauge); incorporated 1884; one locomotive, 24 other vehicles
- Castlederg and Victoria Bridge Tramway 12 km (7.25 mi); (914 mm gauge); incorporated 1883, opened 1884; three locomotives, 34 other vehicles; closed 1933
- Cavan and Leitrim Light Railway 78 km (48.5 mi); (914 mm gauge); incorporated 1883, opened 1888; nine locomotives, 167 other vehicles
- Cavehill and Whitewell Tramway 6 km (3.75 mi)
- Clogher Valley Railway 59 km (37 mi)(914 mm gauge); incorporated 1884, opened 1887; seven locomotives, 127 other vehicles; closed 1942
- Clonakilty Extension Light Railway 14 km (8.75 mi); (914 mm gauge); incorporated 1881, opened 1886
- Cork and Macroom Direct Railway 38 km (24.5 mi); incorporated 1861, opened 1866; four locomotives, 132 other vehicles
- Cork and Muskerry Light Railway (C&MLR) 29 km (18 mi); (914 mm or 3 ft gauge); incorporated 1883, opened 1887; six locomotives, 87 other vehicles
  - Donoughmore Extension Railway 14 km (9 mi) (worked by C&MLR) incorporated 1900
- Cork, Blackrock and Passage Railway 26 km (16 mi); (originally Irish gauge, 1,600 mm or 5 ft 3 in gauge; converted to 914 mm or 3 ft gauge in 1900); incorporated 1846, opened 1850; four locomotives, 57 other vehicles
- Dublin and Blessington Steam Tramway 25 km (15.5 mi); (1,600 mm gauge); incorporated 1887, opened 1888; four locomotives, 46 other vehicles
- Dublin and Lucan Electric Railway 1900–1925, 11 km (7 mi); (3 ft 6 in or 1,067 mm gauge), 37 vehicles. Opened in 1880 as the Dublin and Lucan Steam Tramway (914 mm gauge). Operated by the DUTC 1928–1940 as part of the Dublin tram system; (5 ft 3 in or 1,600 mm gauge)
- Dundalk, Newry and Greenore Railway (London and North Western Railway) 42 km (26.5 mi); incorporated 1863; six locomotives, 230 other vehicles
- Giant's Causeway, Portrush and Bush Valley Railway & Tramway 13 km (8 mi); (914 mm gauge); incorporated 1880; two locomotives, 23 other vehicles
- Listowel and Ballybunion Railway 16 km (10 mi); (Monorail) (Lartigue system); incorporated 1886, opened 1888; three locomotives, 39 other vehicles
- Londonderry and Lough Swilly Railway (L&LSR) 133 km (83 mi); (914 mm gauge); opened 1863/1904 extension; 18 locomotives, 311 other vehicles
  - Letterkenny Railway 26 km (16 mi); worked by L&LSR; opened 1883
- Schull and Skibbereen Railway 22 km (14 mi); four locomotives, 61 other vehicles
- Sligo, Leitrim and Northern Counties Railway 78 km (49 mi); 1,600 mm or 5 ft 3 in gauge; incorporated 1875, opened 1882; 11 locomotives, 228 other vehicles; closed 1957
- South Clare Railway 42 km (26 mi); three locomotives, 27 other vehicles
- Timoleague and Courtmacsherry Railway (T&CR) 14 km (9 mi); (914 mm or 3 ft gauge); incorporated 1888, opened 1891; two locomotives, 119 other vehicles
  - Ballinascarthy Railway; worked by T&CR; (914 mm gauge); incorporated 1888, opened 1890
- Tralee and Dingle Light Railway 60 km (37.5 mi); (914 mm gauge); incorporated 1884, opened 1891; eight locomotives, 108 other vehicles
- Waterford and Tramore Railway 12 km (7.25 mi); incorporated 1851, opened 1853; four locomotives, 32 other vehicles; unique in being the only line to remain unconnected to the rest of the Irish railway. The line closed, under CIÉ, in 1960
- West Clare Railway 43 km (27 mi); (914 mm gauge); opened 1887; eight locomotives, 146 other vehicles

The information contained in this section obtained from Railway Year Book 1912 (Railway Publishing Company)

=== Monorail ===
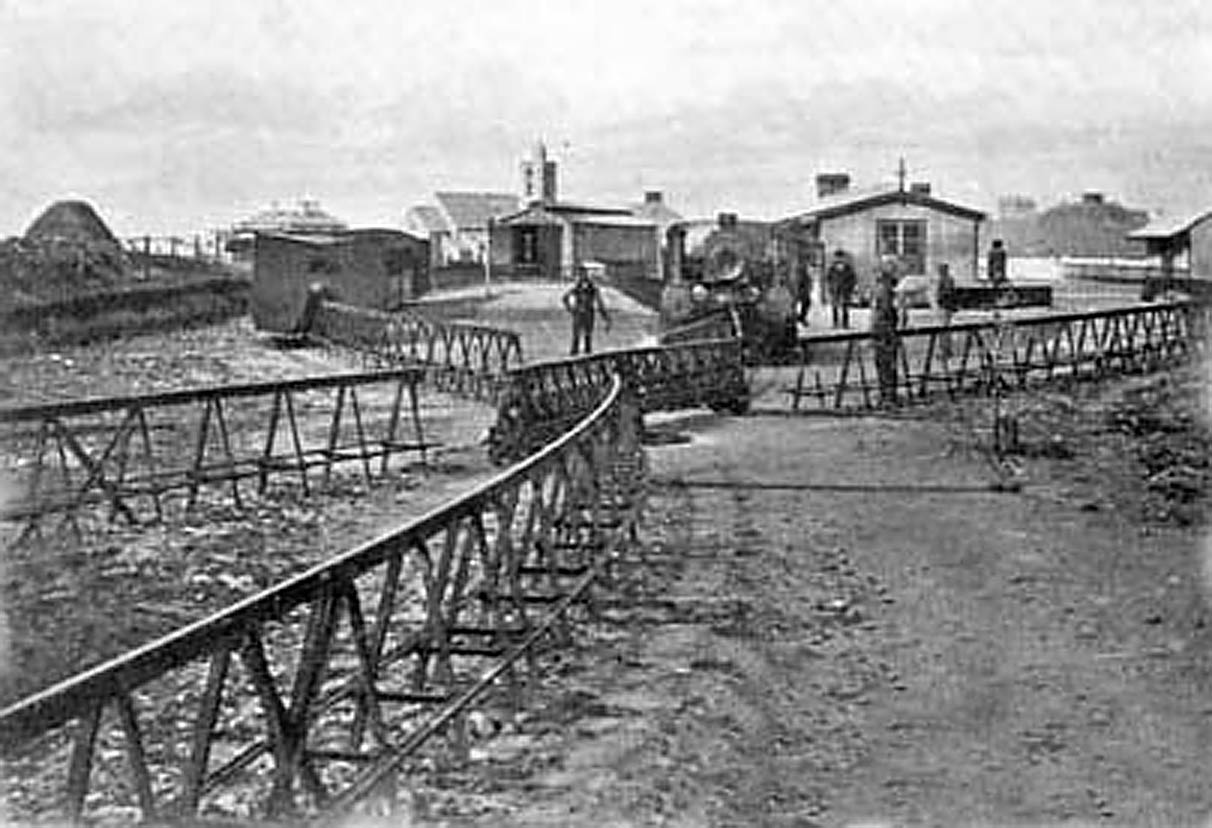
Ballybunion, c. 1902

The Listowel and Ballybunion Railway was opened in 1888. It was the world's first commercial monorail, named the Lartigue system after Charles Lartigue. It operated between Listowel and Ballybunion in County Kerry until 1924.

A modern-day re-creation of this system operates in Listowel.

== The system in the early 20th century ==
An 1890 guidebook to Ireland, produced as part of the Thorough Guides series, noted that railways were "very scarce in the scenery districts" (presumably when compared to the extensive network in Great Britain), but that there was a "great abundance of mail-cars" available as an alternative at those scenic and remote sites.

The rail system, both north and south of the Republic of Ireland–United Kingdom border, survived independence unscathed. The Irish Civil War was to take a much heavier toll on the railways in the newly born Irish Free State (Saorstát Éireann), as the Anti-Treaty IRA systematically targeted them and the Free State had to build a network of fortified blockhouses to protect the railways. One of the most spectacular attacks on the infrastructure was the bombing of the Mallow viaduct (see Guerrilla phase of the Irish Civil War § The war and the railways).

In 1925, the railway companies within Saorstát Éireann were merged to form the Great Southern Railways. This company was amalgamated on 1 January 1945 with the Dublin United Transport Company to form Córas Iompair Éireann.

Partition however, would eventually exact a heavy toll on the cross–border routes (intrinsic to the County Donegal rail network).

World War II also proved costly for the rail system in the Republic. With the war effort, Britain could not spare coal for neutral Ireland. Thus, Irish steam engines often ran on poor quality Irish coal, wood, or not at all. Unsuccessful attempts were even made to burn peat. The deteriorating quality and frequency of service discouraged rail travellers, whose numbers were also diminishing due to steadily increasing emigration.

=== Dieselisation ===
Railways in the Republic were converted to diesel locomotive traction early, and swiftly, due to the run down nature of many of the steam engines, lack of coal, and a desire for modernisation. In 1951 CIÉ's first diesel railcars arrived, followed in 1953 by an order for 100 diesel locomotives.

=== Rationalisation ===
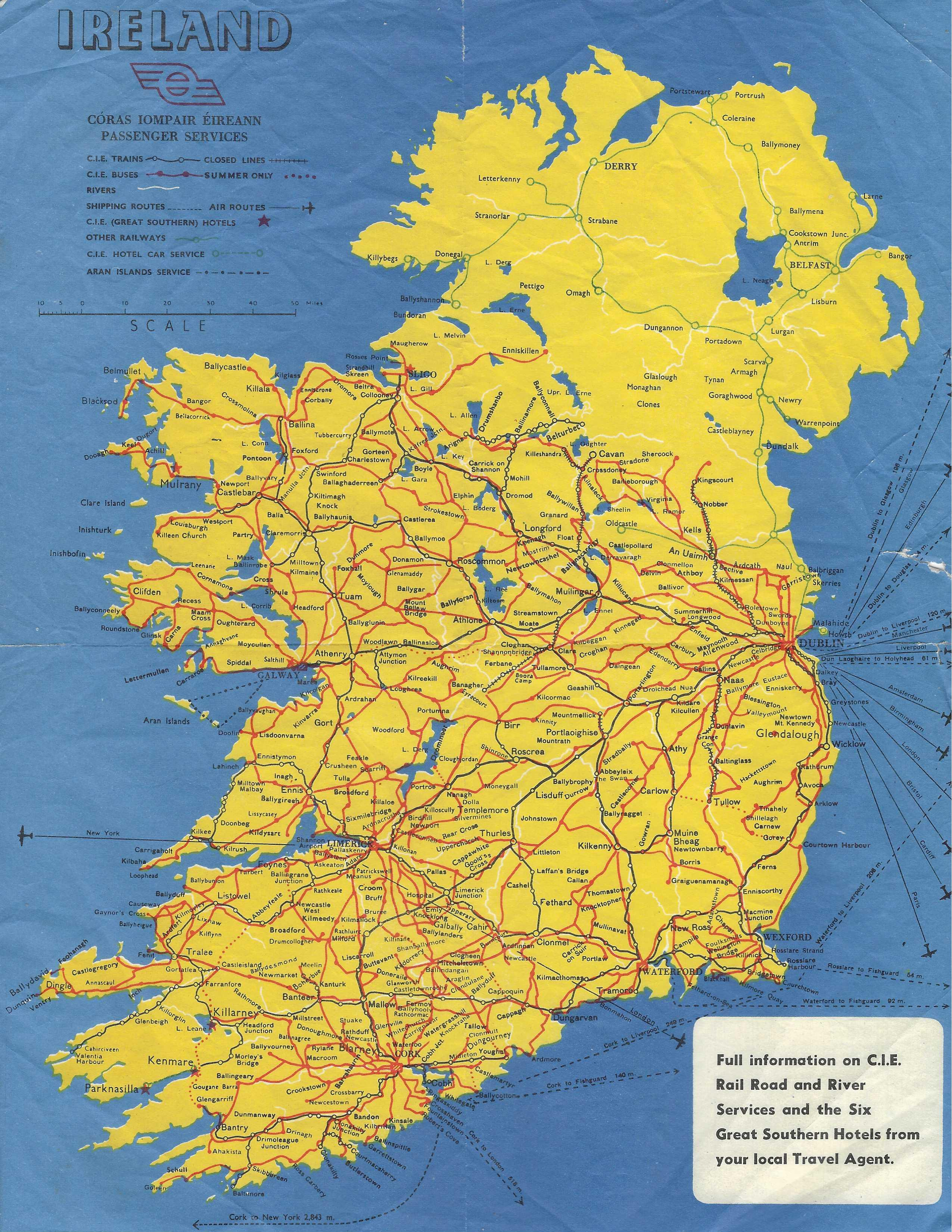
A CIÉ network map from c. 1958, during the period of closures

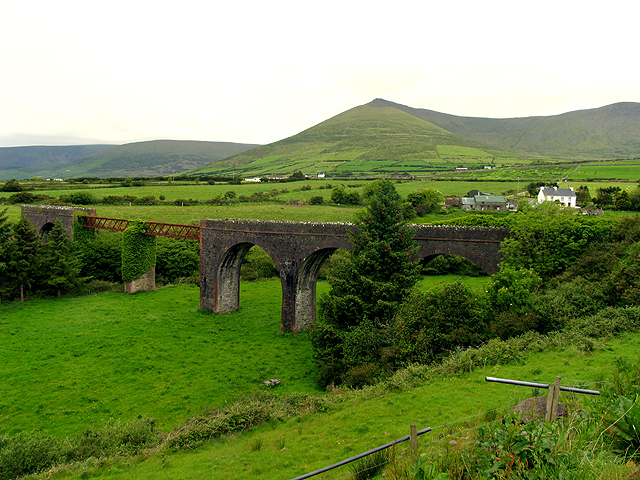
Disused railway viaduct at Lispole, County Kerry on the Dingle–Tralee line

In the 1950s and 1960s, many lines were closed (a maximum of 2,668 miles (4,294 km) in the Republic and 754 miles (1,213 km) in Northern Ireland was reached in 1920, declining to 2,440 miles (3,930 km) and 542 miles (872 km) respectively in 1950 and 2,221 miles (3,574 km) and 336 miles (541 km) by 1957) but evidence is still visible in the landscape, as are more significant features like bridges and viaducts.

The entire West Cork Railway network closed, as were most branch lines in the Republic. The main route network survived intact, with a relatively even distribution of cutbacks. The main routes from Dublin to Belfast, Sligo, Galway and the West of Ireland, Limerick, Cork and Kerry, Waterford and Wexford survived. The cross country route from Rosslare to Limerick and onwards to Sligo survived for a time, although services would later cease on almost all the routes. The North Kerry line from Limerick to Tralee survived until the 1970s.

One notable closure was that of the Dublin and South Eastern Railway Harcourt Street railway line in Dublin, despite being regarded as an important commuter artery. On 30 June 2004, the majority of the route reopened as part of the new Luas tram system. South of the Sandyford depot, decisions taken by CIÉ and Dún Laoghaire–Rathdown County Council, to sell the trackbed through Foxrock and allow houses to be built on it near Shankill respectively have made integrating this route into the Luas system difficult. After Sandyford the line detours over the Leopardstown roundabout so as to run west around the Leopardstown Racecourse before rejoining the original alignment just north of Carrickmines. The Harcourt Street line had run around the eastern edge of the racecourse, via Silverpark. Remnants of the old Foxrock Station are visible at the back of The Hedgerows in Foxrock. After this detour around Leopardstown Racecourse, the current line runs roughly along the original alignment with some minor detours, particularly prevalent at Laughanstown.

The Luas Green Line currently terminates at Bride's Glen, just north of the viaduct of the same name. It has been proposed to restore the viaduct should it carry the proposed Luas extension to Bray.

In a few years, the Ulster Transport Authority shut down a large network across Ulster, leaving only Belfast to Derry, Dublin and branches to Larne and Bangor. CIÉ, the transport company in the Republic, had no option but to close their end of cross-border routes. Today a large hole remains in the island's rail network, with a distance of 210 km (130 mi) from Derry to Mullingar untouched by railways, and no rail service to large towns such as Letterkenny and Monaghan.

=== 1970s and 1980s ===
In the 1970s and 1980s, there was a long period without substantial investment in the rail system, with the notable exception of the Dublin Area Rapid Transit (DART), in which the north–south commuter route in and out of Dublin was electrified, and new frequent services have run from July 1984 to the present day. It was intended to expand the service, with routes to the West of the city, but economic conditions militated against this. In fact, the size of the DART fleet remained unaltered until the year 2000.

Also, 1976 saw the introduction of a small fleet of 18 high-speed diesel-electric locomotives built by General Motors Electro-Motive Diesel at La Grange, Illinois. These 2,475 hp (1,846 kW) units, 071 Class, were capable of speeds of 145 km/h (90 mph) and immediately began operating express services such as the Cork-Dublin line.

A major disaster occurred on 1 August 1980, when 18 people were killed and 62 injured in a rail accident in Buttevant on the main Cork-Dublin line. A train carrying 230 passengers was derailed when it crashed into a siding at 110 km/h (70 mph). The passengers who were most severely injured or killed were seated in coaches with wooden frames. This structure was incapable of surviving a high speed crash and did not come near to the safety standards provided by modern (post 1950s) metal bodied coaches. This accident led to a major review of the national rail safety policy and resulted in the rapid elimination of the wooden-bodied coaches that had formed part of the train.

The decision to purchase a new fleet of modern InterCity carriages based on the British Rail Mark 3 design was quickly made. These coaches, an already well proven design, were built by BREL in Derby, England and, under licence, at CIÉ's own workshops at Inchicore in Dublin between 1980 and 1989. Other carriages to join the fleet in the 1980s were second-hand ex British Rail Mark 2s.

Cutbacks continued in this period: in 1975 the last rural branch line between Attymon Junction and Loughrea was closed, the line between Limerick and Claremorris and a number of local stations on main lines (such as Buttevant) lost their passenger services. Freight closures at the end of the 1980s included the closure of the line to Youghal in County Cork and the removal of the North Kerry line.

=== 1990s rail revival ===
In the 1990s, the Republic experienced an economic boom (known colloquially as the Celtic Tiger). This allowed substantial investment to be made. 34 new locomotives (designated 201 Class) were purchased from General Motors, including two for Northern Ireland Railways (NIR). New De Dietrich carriages were also purchased for the cross-border 'Enterprise' service. Meanwhile, the route network was upgraded to continuous welded rail (CWR) and old mechanical signalling was replaced by electronic signalling.

In the mid-1990s, the Greater Dublin area continued to experience a population boom. Such commuter trains as existed were ageing slam-door stock on unreliable old locomotives (the better stock was for InterCity use). The DART was limited in terms of capacity and route. New diesel railcars were ordered, and added first to the Kildare suburban route. The route from Clonsilla to Maynooth was double-tracked and further diesel railcars ordered, and the reopening of stations such as Drumcondra. Again, the North-South Dublin route saw new railcars provide services to Dundalk and Arklow. A number of orders were made for new DART carriages, the first for over a decade.

=== 2000s ===
The line was electrified and DART services extended in the South East to Greystones in 2000 and on to Malahide on the Northern line.

DART and Commuter stations were also upgraded, allowing access for people with disabilities with new lifts at footbridges and lengthened platforms to accommodate 8-car sets. Extra roads were provided out of Dublin, while the main terminals of Dublin Connolly and Dublin Heuston were upgraded (the latter completed in 2004, doubling its previous capacity). A new railcar servicing depot was built at Drogheda in 2004 (Inchicore continues to be used for locomotives and carriages).

Iarnród Éireann placed orders for 67 InterCity carriages in 2003 and for 150 "regional railcars" (diesel multiple unit) in 2004. These were used to meet the demand on the railways, and all older carriages were retired from revenue service by September 2009. At peak times, capacity was below requirements. It has been seen in recent years that Iarnród Éireann have phased out all locomotive hauled services, other than those using the 67 Mark 4 carriages on the Dublin-Cork Main Line and the Enterprise on the Dublin-Belfast Main Line, with 22000 Class railcars.

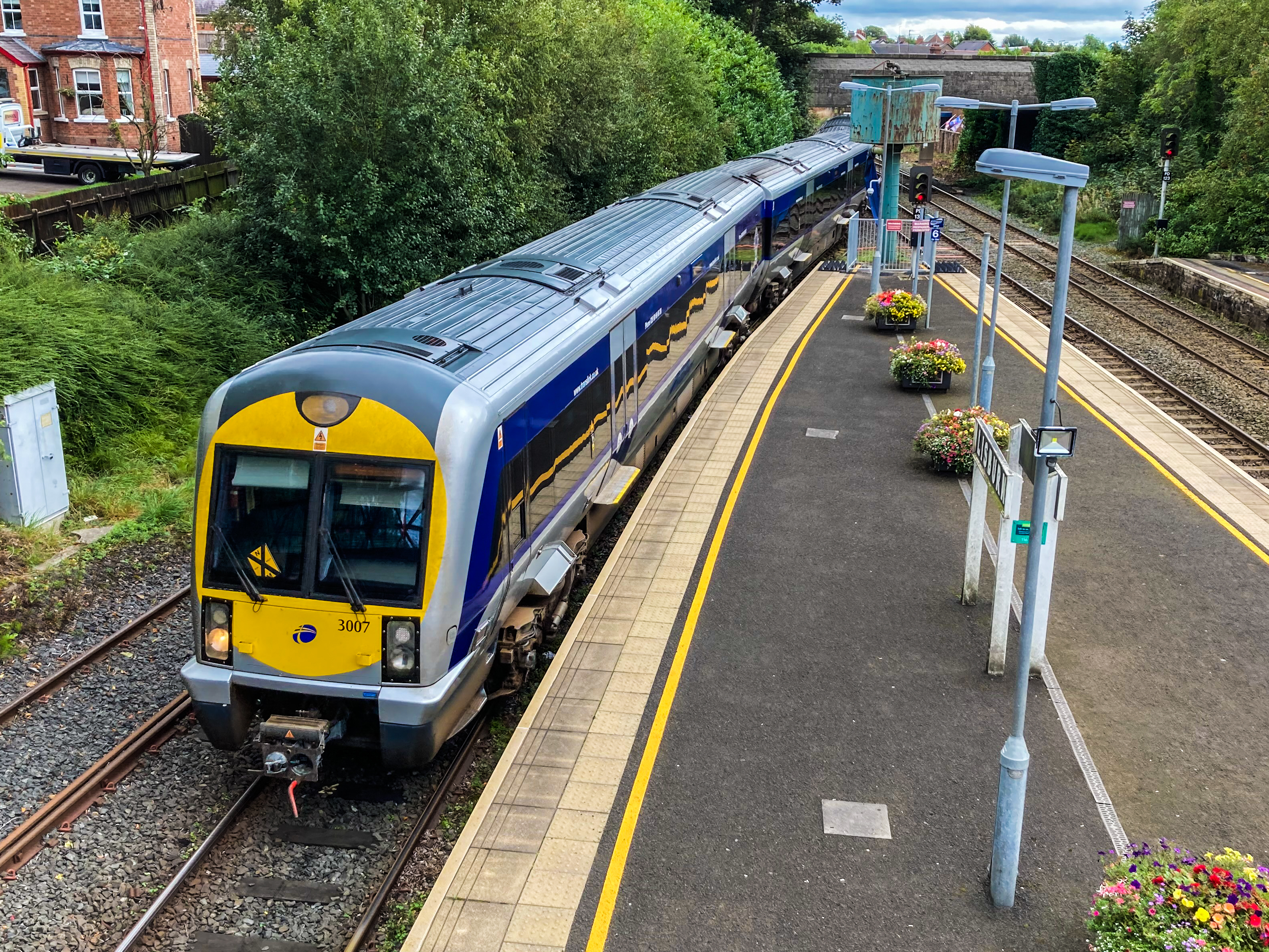
NIR Class 3000 no. 3007 terminating at Lisburn train station

Northern Ireland too has experienced recent rail investment. Central Station has been redesigned, and the Bleach Green-Antrim line, a more direct route for trains to Derry, was reopened in 2001 (although this led to the suspension of the Lisburn–Antrim line and the closure of three rural stations). The line to Bangor was relaid. A new railcar fleet has entered service. The single-track line to Derry, north of Coleraine continues to be of a poor standard. A derailment in 2003, caused by cliff-side boulders falling onto the line, closed the route for some time. In the face of long journey times and a frequent (and generally faster) bus service, the route's future remains in some doubt.

In March 2007, as part of the Transport 21 initiative, Docklands railway station opened, the first new station in Dublin city centre since 1891's Tara Street.

In July 2009, commuter trains began to run from Mallow to Cork, and on part of the reopened Cork to Youghal line to Midleton and to Cobh, a number of stations were opened, and there are plans for more stations on the lines.

All 100 Mark 3 carriages (dating back from 1980 to 1989) were phased out in September 2009 with capacity being taken up by 22000 Class railcars. Most of the Mark 3 fleet was scrapped between 2013 and 2014 but 11 were purchased by Belmond and converted for use as the Belmond Grand Hibernian in service since April 2016.

=== 2010s ===
In September 2010 services began from Dunboyne to Dublin Docklands after the redevelopment of 7.5 km section of the old Navan railway line which had been closed in 1963 from Dunboyne to Clonsilla on the Maynooth line. There are proposals for further development of this line to Navan as part of Iarnród Éireann's plans by 2030.

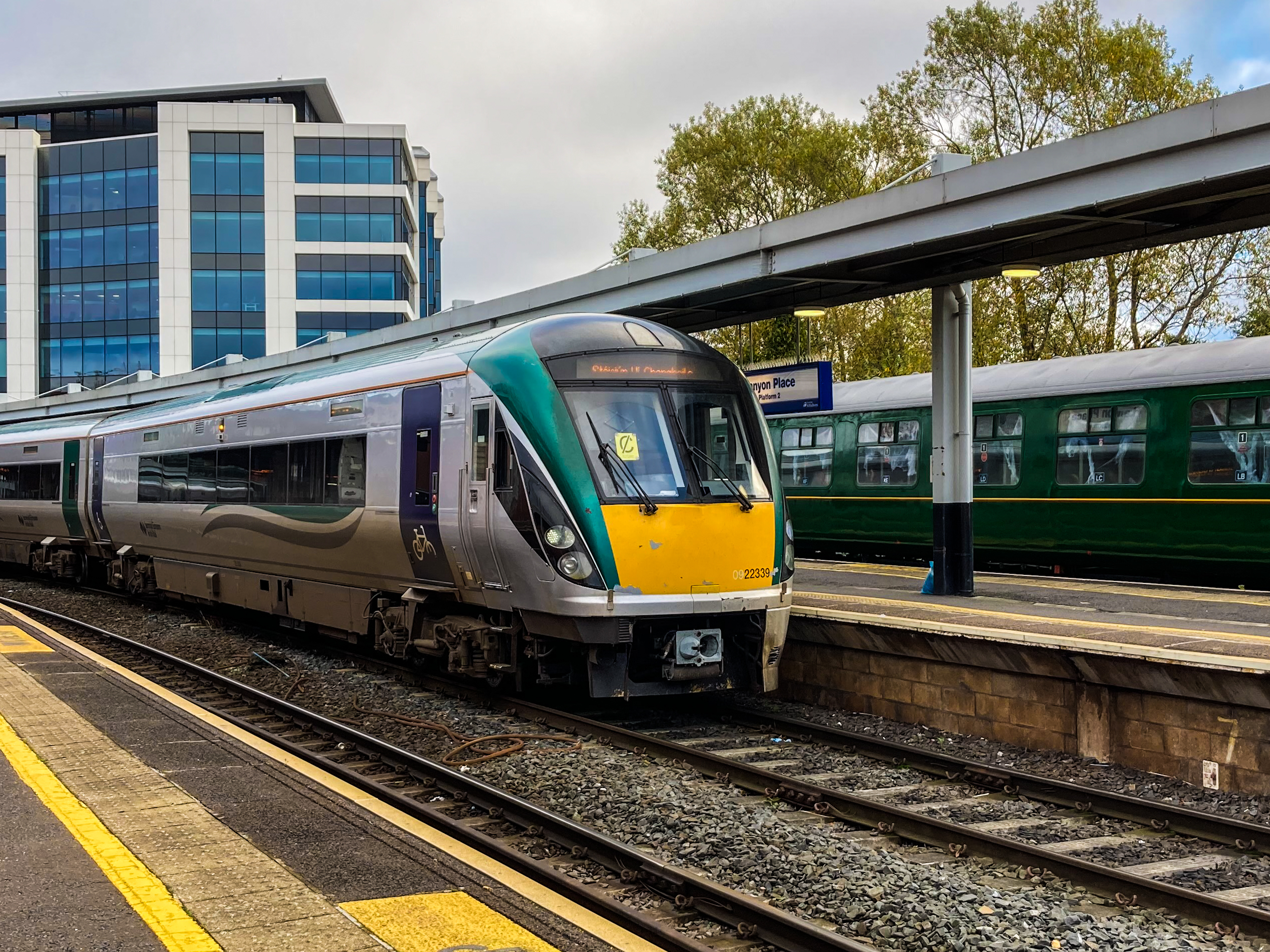
Irish Rail 22000 Class no. 22339 is about to depart on an Enterprise service from Belfast Lanyon Place station.

More deliveries of Commuter and InterCity 22000 Class railcars took place from March 2007 until April 2012, when the final deliveries took place. The route west to Kildare was quadrupled between 2007 and 2010.

NI Railways underwent a major investment programme over the past few years, with track upgrades to the line between Belfast and Derry and 20 new trains which replaced the remaining Class 80 and Class 450 rolling stock. The new trains were a development of the existing Class 3000 units, the Class 4000, which entered service in 2011 and 2012.

Until 2013 Ireland was the only European Union state that had not implemented EU Directive 91/440 and related legislation, having derogated its obligation to split train operations and infrastructure businesses; a similar situation exists in Northern Ireland. A consultation on the restructuring of IÉ took place in 2012. The derogation ended on 14 March 2013, when Iarnród Éireann was split in two sectors: Railway Undertaking and Infrastructure Manager. Former Irish Transport Minister Leo Varadkar indicated that any open access private operators would not receive any subsidy to operate.

== Current and future projects ==
Some call for the expansion of the rail network in the Republic. The route from Limerick to Waterford is due to have a realistic service for the first time in decades. A railway right of way exists from Limerick, up through the west, to Sligo. This has been titled the Western Railway Corridor (WRC) and some see it as a possible counterbalance to investment in Dublin. Phase 1 is complete with the line from Ennis to Athenry open since March 2010. Phases 2 and 3, from Athenry to Tuam, with an extension from Tuam to Claremorris to link up with the Westport/Ballina line to Dublin, are deferred indefinitely. Future proposals would see the line extended to Sligo, where it would also link with Ireland West Airport.

In 2024, a study titled the All-Island Strategic Rail Review was published which recommended a number of changes to the current network; among these was electrification on the main InterCity routes, along with the restoration of the Lisburn–Antrim line, Dublin–Navan railway line, Limerick–Foynes railway line, South Wexford Railway, Athenry–Claremorris line, Athlone–Mullingar line, Limavady Railway, Derry Road and Mullingar–Portadown line, as well as several new lines. It also recommended developing freight service and connectivity with airports and completing the DART Underground project.

Considering that there are significant cost-savings when double-tracking, electrification, track geometry and track formation improvements are done at once, and the fact that the oldest of the InterCity rail fleet won't even be 30 years old by 2035, it is unlikely that any whole InterCity line will see the start of electrification and double-tracking before 2030.

As of 2022, the cost of a single InterCity railcar was €3.7 million including maintenance. There are plans to hybridise the 22.000 fleet with battery powerpacks and replacement gearboxes - that will lead to cleaner emissions, reduced noise and 0 to 160 km/h up to 60 seconds quicker than today. With stop-heavy InterCity services like Sligo, this could result in a reduction of up to 14 minutes per journey on some InterCity routes.

=== Projects ===
==== DART Plus ====
The DART Plus programme is currently underway. This will see a massive three-fold expansion of the Dublin DART network from 50 km to 150 km.

DART Coastal North (between Malahide and Drogheda), DART West (between Maynooth and Connolly) and DART Southwest (between Hazelhatch & Cellbridge to Connolly) have all been granted Railway Orders for the electrification for the line. DART South West will also see four-tracking between Parkwest & Cherry Orchard to Heuston Station with a new Heuston West station being built.

In 2025, there is extensive head of series testing of the new DART IÉ 90000 Class hybrid battery electric EMU fleet. With the new fleet expected to enter service between Drogheda and Bray in 2026.

==== Galway Ceannt Redevelopment ====
Galway Ceannt Station is currently undergoing redevelopment with a brand new train shed being constructed. The station will go from 2 platforms to 5 platforms. This will leave future platform provision for expansion of the Western Rail Corridor to Claremorris as well the expected higher frequency of hourly service that has been signposted to happen within the next couple of years.

The redeveloped Galway Ceannt is expected to open in the middle of 2026.

==== New Waterford Plunkett Station ====
A new Waterford railway through-station is currently being constructed in the North Quays. This will offer better access to the city and the local bus network. It is expected that Waterford will get hourly services when the new station opens in the middle of 2026. Long-term if the South Wexford station is built and the Wexford to Waterford railway reopens (with an altered route) as per the All-Ireland Rail Review recommendations, it is not inconceivable that the new station will go from being a terminus to a through-station stop for much of the services.

Concurrent with the new station being built are flood-protection infrastructure measures. These works are expected to conclude early in 2026. The flood prevention works were completed in April 2026.

==== Spencer Dock Terminus Station ====
Irish Rail have sought tenders for the design and build of Spencer Dock Station. This will be a four-platform terminal station that is expected to handle Maynooth and Sligo services. It will offer multi-modal transport with the LUAS Spencer Dock stop being right outside the station.

==== Further Additional Stations ====
Since 2024 Irish Rail have added two new stations, Kishogue on the Cork line and Woodbrook on the Rosslare line.

Irish Rail plan to build new stations in Moyross, Limerick as well as Cabra and Kylemore in Dublin. The expansion of the Cork Suburban Network will see 8 new stations built in the process.

==== Oranmore Second Platform and Dynamic Passing Loop ====
In October, 2025, construction began on the build-out of a second platform, as well as a dynamic passing loop at Oranmore Station. The passing loop will be 1 km in length. The second platform will allow more services for Oranmore and Irish Rail will then be able to fit 4 trains per hour between Athenry and Galway Ceannt, instead of the nominal 2 at present. This will allow an increase in frequency of both Dublin and Limerick services to and from Galway and will ease the current restrictive bottleneck on additional services. Construction is expected to be finished by the end of summer, 2027.

==== Galway line consultants ====
Multidisciplinary consultants have been appointed to the Galway Line with a view to improving services holistically; constructing the Navan Line and improving and decarbonising InterCity services with an emphasis on Cork and Limerick under Project Connect

==== Improvement and Future-proofing of Cork Line ====
In 2023, funding was granted to allow upgrading the Cork line to increase line speed and reduce journey times. Future-proofing to allow 200 km/h trains was also part of this brief.

While speaking to the Irish Times, Michael Power, head of Irish Rail's Business plans, stated that improvements to track and ballast, straightening of curves and signalling system enhancements could deliver 200 km/h line speed and journeys of 1 hour 50 minutes between Dublin and Cork by the mid-2030s without the purchase of additional land. It's likely that this refers to either non-stop journeys where the current time is 2 hours 14 minutes, or limited stopping patterns.

It is expected that piling would be required to deliver high speeds on tracks going over peatland. This has already been done on the Cork Line at Lisduff. Irish Rail were the first to pilot mini-piling on deep peatland on a working rail line outside Clara, Offaly.

==== Cork Suburban Rail Upgrade ====
Cork, under Irish Rail, is currently undergoing large infrastructure investment in its suburban rail network. The project is called the Cork Area Commuter Rail, or CACR.

Signalling to ETCS is currently underway to allow faster frequency of services. A new 220m through platform in Cork Kent has been constructed and was opened for service in 2025. Double-tracking Glounthaune to Midleton is occurring at present and the project is expected to be completed by the end of 2026.

After the ETCS signalling and twin-tracking is complete for Cork, phase two will begin.

Phase 2 will see the building of 8 new stations, a new depot, upgrades to 3 existing stations and electrification of the Cork rail network to 25KV AC between Cobh/Midleton and Mallow. There will be 10 minute peak time frequencies between Mallow and Kent and between Glounthaune and Cobh/Midleton. Between Kent and Glounthane will be the capacity for trains every 5 minutes.

==== Four North ====
An EU-funded feasibility study is due to be published on four-tracking between Connolly and Malahide to alleviate a major bottleneck on the Irish Rail network. The aim is to separate InterCity and express services from stopping services to remove conflicts and speed up journey times.

==== Heuston Train Control Centre ====
A new national train control centre has been built at Heuston Station in Dublin and it is expected to take full control of all signalling by 2028. A hodgepodge mixture of different bespoke signalling systems going across different decades and local train control operations in Connolly and Athlone, among others, has added to the difficulty in switching over.

==== Nationwide Rollout of ETCS ====
Irish Rail is in the process of rolling out ETCS signalling across the network. This will replace ATP (used by the existing DART trains) and CAWS used on InterCity trains. Both of these train control systems are unique to Irish Rail. ATP, in particular, has poor granular speed control and the switch to ETCS is expected to deliver quite significant journey time improvements. Head of series testing of ETCS on the 22000 class has been completed.

==== Cork Level Crossing Project ====
A railway order has now been granted to the removal of 7 railway level crossings This will speed up InterCity journeys between Cork and Limerick/Dublin.

==== East Coastal Protection Infrastructure ====
Irish Rail is undertaking the East Coast Railway Infrastructure Protection Projects to prevent coastal erosion at 5 key points. This project is currently in its second-round of public consultation.

==== Greystones and Wicklow Town DART Extension ====
Irish Rail plan to implement higher frequency service from Bray to Greystones from half-hourly service to a train every 20 minutes. This is expected to be in place by 2028.

An extension of the DART line with battery electric trains is expected to be in place by 2029. This will allow hourly trains to Wicklow.

==== Foynes Line Reopening ====
The 42 km-long Foynes to Limerick railway line is due to reopen in 2026 after a two-year construction period. It will be a freight-line, though there are some suggestions that a temporary platform might be built to accommodate the Ryder Cup at Adare in 2027.

==== New Dublin Port Freight Yard ====
Dublin Port is undertaking significant investment in a new rail freight yard with the existing line along Alexandra Road being renewed. There will be grade-separation between trains and lorries when the line reopens in 2027.

==== Freight Hubs and Wagon Purchases ====
Irish Rail plans to construct several new multimodal freight hubs in the coming years with Castlebar likely to be the first.

Irish Rail have agreed to purchase 150 freight wagons with an agreement to expand this figure to 400 wagons if conditions prove favourable.

== See also ==
- History of Ireland
- History of rail transport
- History of rail transport in Great Britain
- Rail transport in Ireland
- Diesel Locomotives of Ireland
- Irish Railway Bibliography
- Northern Ireland Railways
- Irish railway accidents
  - Armagh rail disaster
  - Buttevant Rail Disaster

== Sources ==
- Baddeley, M. J. B. (1890). Thorough Guide Series. Ireland (Part I). Northern Counties including Dublin and Neighbourhood (Second Edition - Revised). London: Dulau & Co., 37, Soho Square, W.
