= Transport 21 =

Irish road, bus and rail infrastructure plan

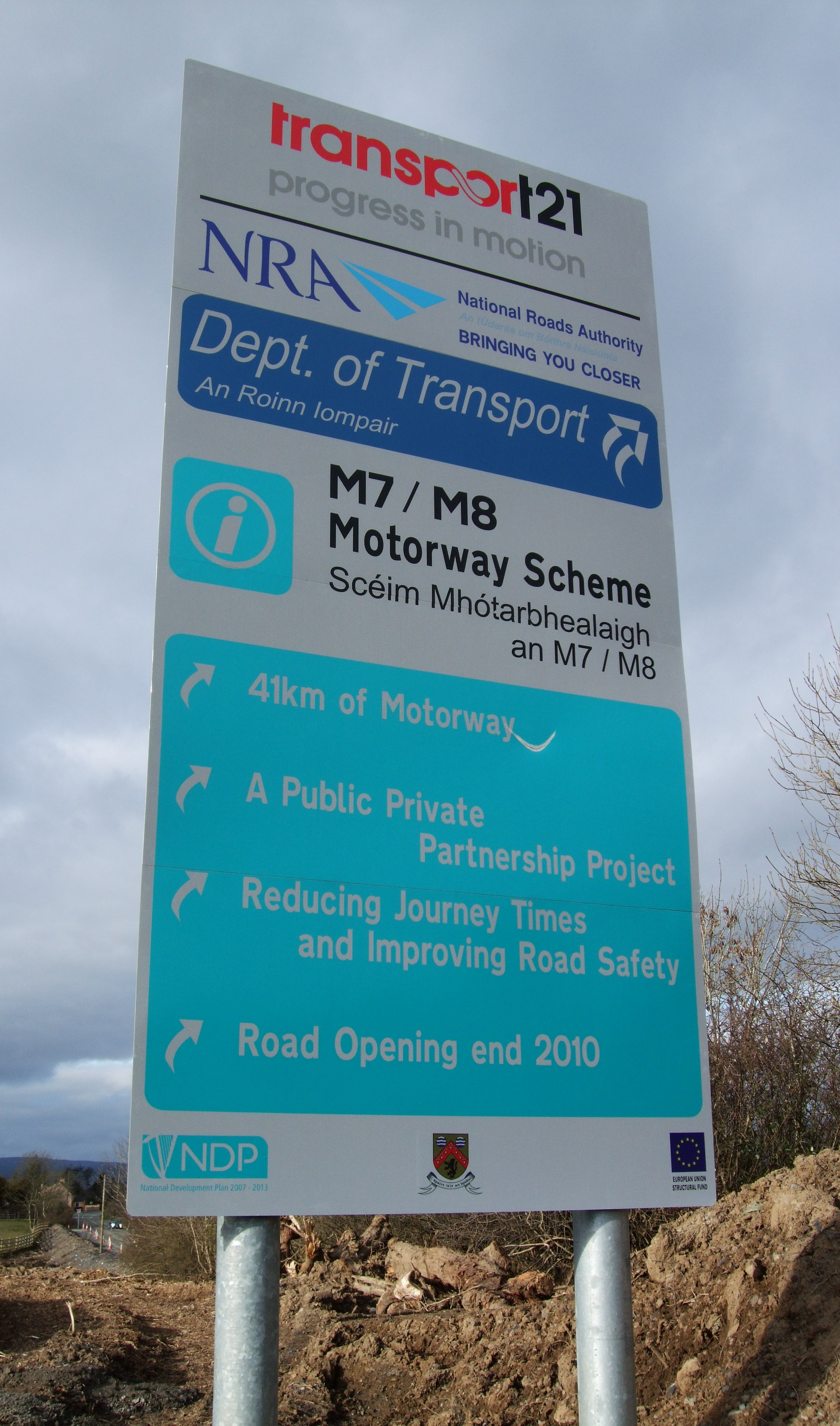
Transport 21 signage for the M7/M8 motorway scheme in County Laois.

Transport 21 was an Irish infrastructure plan, announced in November 2005. Its aims were to greatly expand Ireland's transport network. A cost estimate of €34 billion was attached to the plan at the time.

The plan included continuing investment in Ireland's road network, along with investment in public transport in the form of buses and rail.

After the collapse of the Irish banking system the Transport 21 project was cancelled in May 2011.

A portion of this investment would focus on the creation of an integrated rail network in Dublin. Projects included a tunnel under Dublin city centre connecting Heuston Station with Pearse Station and Docklands station at Spencer Dock. This would facilitate the expansion of the Dublin Area Rapid Transit (DART) system from one line to two. Also included were several new Luas lines, a metro system, and tighter integration between all rail systems, particularly at the planned St. Stephen's Green interchange. This would create a single integrated rail network in Dublin that served the north, south, east and west of the city.

Other rail investment included the planned Western Railway Corridor, redevelopment of a rail link from Navan to Dublin and upgrading and extending suburban rail in Cork.

Also included in the plan was the significant expansion of the Dublin Bus passenger-carrying capacity, completion of the motorway system linking all the major urban centres on the island, and better integration of all transport systems.

== Luas - Dublin ==
=== St. Stephen's Green to Luas Red Line (Line BX) ===
The RPA (Railway Procurement Agency) announced the new preferred route extension from the Green Line stop at St. Stephen's Green to Luas Red Line (Line BX) in 2011. The route continues on from St. Stephen's Green towards Dawson Street, Grafton Street Lower, College Green, Westmoreland Street, O'Connell Street and Parnell Square. Construction of the line began in June 2013 and was opened on 9 December 2017.

=== Connolly to Point Depot (Line C1) ===
The route for the Red Line extension (Line C1) from Connolly to the Point Depot was fixed in the early 2000s and the Railway Order was signed by the Minister of Transport in December 2006. Construction works got underway in June 2007, with the centrepiece being a new bridge at the Harbourmaster Place end of Mayor Street. It was officially opened in 2009.

=== Sandyford to Brides Glen (Line B1) ===
The route for the Green Line extension (Line B1) from Sandyford to Brides Glen was chosen by the RPA and the Railway Order was signed by the Minister of Transport in August 2006. The line opened on 16 October 2010.

=== Brides Glen to Bray (Line B2) ===
The route for this line had been selected (Route 2). This project is currently being reconsidered by the National Transport Authority.

=== Belgard to Saggart (Line A1) ===
A Red Line extension was planned from Belgard to Saggart to be built as a Public Private Partnership Initiative (PPP). The line received planning permission in June 2008 and construction got underway in February 2009. The track from Belgard began preparing for track laying on 11 January 2010 by closing the Belgard Stop. It became operational in 2011.

=== Line BX to Liffey Junction (Line D) ===
Construction on the Luas Line D began in June 2013. This route uses the former Broadstone rail alignment. It opened on 9 December 2017.

== Light Rail Metro - Dublin ==
A Dublin Metro project has been in discussion for many years. The construction of a light metro system, similar to the Porto Metro in Portugal, was originally planned.

=== Stephen's Green to Belinstown (Metro North) ===
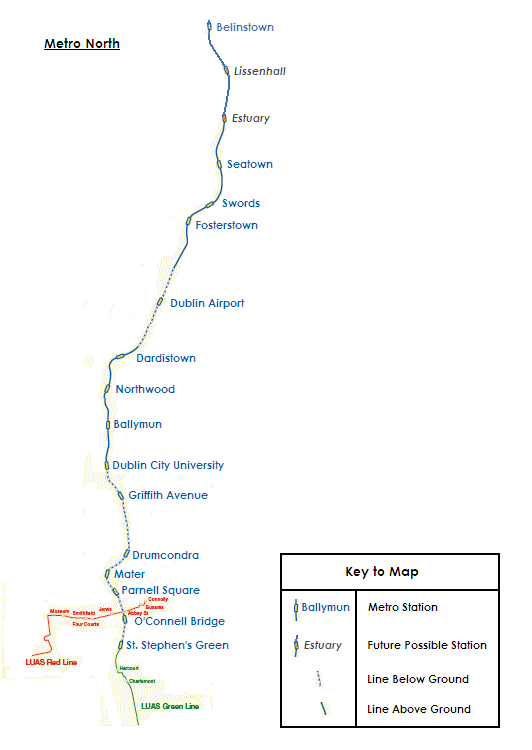

The RPA had announced the Metro North from St Stephen's Green to Belinstown north of Swords via Dublin Airport and sought public comments on the route. A total of 17 stops are planned, and the length of each train would be 90m.

In October 2006, RPA published an initial route for Metro North, with a revised route appearing in April 2008. This route is to be a Public Private Partnership initiative (PPP) and in September 2008 the RPA applied to An Bord Pleanala for a Railway Order. In 2011, due to the economic climate, Metro North was deferred for a number of years.

=== Tallaght to Dardistown (Metro West) ===
The RPA had announced the Metro West from Tallaght to Dardistown, and had sought public comments on two route options. On 5 July 2007 the Emerging Preferred Route Corridor was announced. The route ran from Tallaght to Metro North at Dardistown, south of Dublin Airport via Clondalkin, Liffey Valley and Blanchardstown and was approximately 25.5 km long. This route was also to be a Public Private Partnership Initiative (PPP).

There is no timescale available for the Metro West project as it has been deferred until further notice.

== DART - Greater Dublin Area ==
Proposed DART service on the Kildare Line

Under the Transport 21 Plan, the DART network would have gone through a fundamental change from the coastally-focused north–south line which currently exists, to a two-line system which crossed the city. One of these lines (DART Line 1) would run from Maynooth/M3 Parkway to Greystones via Connolly station, while the other (DART Line 2) would run from Balbriggan to Hazelhatch and Celbridge, via the DART Underground. Both lines would intersect at Pearse.

=== Kildare Route Project ===
If the DART is extended from Heuston Station to Hazelhatch, it would quickly find itself in trouble, as the busy Cork, Limerick, Waterford and Galway InterCity service as well as the Kildare and other Commuter services use the same track. This would cause major interference to the DART frequency and service. So Iarnród Éireann decided to quadruple the track (originally 2 track) from Inchicore to just past Hazelhatch station. The Railway Order was signed by the Minister of Transport in December 2006. The project was partially completed in early 2010, with the section between Inchicore and Cherry Orchard deferred to Kildare Route Project Phase 2.

=== DART Underground ===
First suggested in the 1970s, the DART Underground proposal called for a tunnel connecting the Northern DART line to the Kildare line. The project was shelved in 2011, and not included in the Greater Dublin Area Strategy 2022 to 2042 published in late 2021.

== Commuter - Greater Dublin Area ==
=== Docklands Station ===
Under Transport 21, a new Docklands railway station was built in the Spencer Dock area of Dublin city centre. Its purpose was to increase the capacity and frequency of rail services that operate along the Sligo rail line, which was restricted by the heavily congested Dublin Connolly Station.

Groundbreaking ceremonies at the temporary location for the new station were held on 9 March 2006 and the station opened in March 2007.

By by-passing Connolly and using Docklands Station, it was possible to add extra services on the Maynooth and Longford Commuter services and it provided an alternative terminus for Western Commuter services to Clonsilla and M3 Parkway.

=== Clonsilla to M3 Parkway ===
The former Clonsilla to Navan railway line was closed in 1963, but the trackbed was largely preserved. Under the Transport 21 plan, a section of the disused Navan rail line would run from Clonsilla station in west Dublin to Navan in county Meath (42 km). It uses Docklands Station in Dublin city centre exclusively. The first phase of the line (Clonsilla to Dunboyne) included 3 new stations. It opened in September 2010. The second phase would have completed the line as far as Navan and it has been deferred until further notice.

== Commuter - other ==
=== Mallow to Midleton - Cork ===
This project, to reopen part of the Cork–Youghal railway line as far as Midleton, started construction in November 2007. New stations were built on the Northern Line to Mallow from Cork's Kent station and on the Eastern Line to Cobh and Midleton, as well as a new 10 km section of rail line from Glounthaune to Midleton. A total of 7 new or reopened stations were constructed, in addition to the existing 7. The Cork Suburban Rail network received increased funding under Transport 21.

The spur to Midleton piece of this project opened in July 2009. Seven new or renovated stations were opened during 2010.

=== Western Railway Corridor - additional phases ===
Under Transport 21, the Western Rail Corridor (WRC) from Ennis to Claremorris would have been re-opened in 3 sections.

The first section, Ennis to Athenry, was re-opened on 30 March 2010. In September 2006, the Minister for Transport announced that the government had approved funding for Iarnród Éireann to proceed with the development of the section. Work began in 2008, and an Intercity service is now provided between the cities of Limerick and Galway.

The second section, Athenry to Tuam, was deferred "until further notice". The government had originally approved funding for the development of the section, subject to completion by Iarnród Éireann of a full appraisal.

The third section, Tuam to Claremorris, was also deferred "until further notice". If opened as proposed, the Westport-Dublin, Galway-Dublin and Limerick-Dublin lines would have been connected together to provide inter-regional services within the Border Midland West Region.

== Regional airports ==
Approximately €86 million was allocated to regional airports around Ireland. The airports included in the scheme were Ireland West Airport; Kerry Airport; Sligo Airport; Donegal Airport; Waterford Airport and Galway Airport.

€38.7 million was spent on projects aimed at improving safety and security, including better fire fighting equipment, new Instrument Landing Systems and navigational aids and the provision of Runway End Safety Areas at a number of airports.

The remaining €48 million had been approved for projects aimed towards catering for prospective businesses at these airports. However, this project was deferred until further notice.

== See also ==
- List of rapid transit systems
- History of rail transport in Ireland
- Rail transport in Ireland
- National Development Plan
