= National Development Plan =

Large infrastructure developments in Ireland

- Plean Forbartha Náisiúnta
- Type of project: Development planning
- Country: Ireland
- Launched: 1 January 1988
- Closed: 31 December 2011
- Status: Ended
- Website: www.ndp.ie

National Development Plan (NDP, Irish: Plean Forbartha Náisiúnta) is the title given by the Irish Government to a scheme of organised large-scale expenditure on (mainly) national infrastructure. The first five-year plan ran from 1988 to 1993, the second was a six-year plan from 1994 to 1999 and the third ran as a seven-year plan from 2000 to 2006. A fourth National Development Plan ran from 2007 to 2011 (spending €70 million a day every day during this period). The main elements of the third plan were the development of a national motorway network between the major cities in Ireland. The upgrading of the rail network was a secondary scheme.

The ESRI conducted a review of the latest NDP in 2023.

== Achievements ==
=== Road network ===
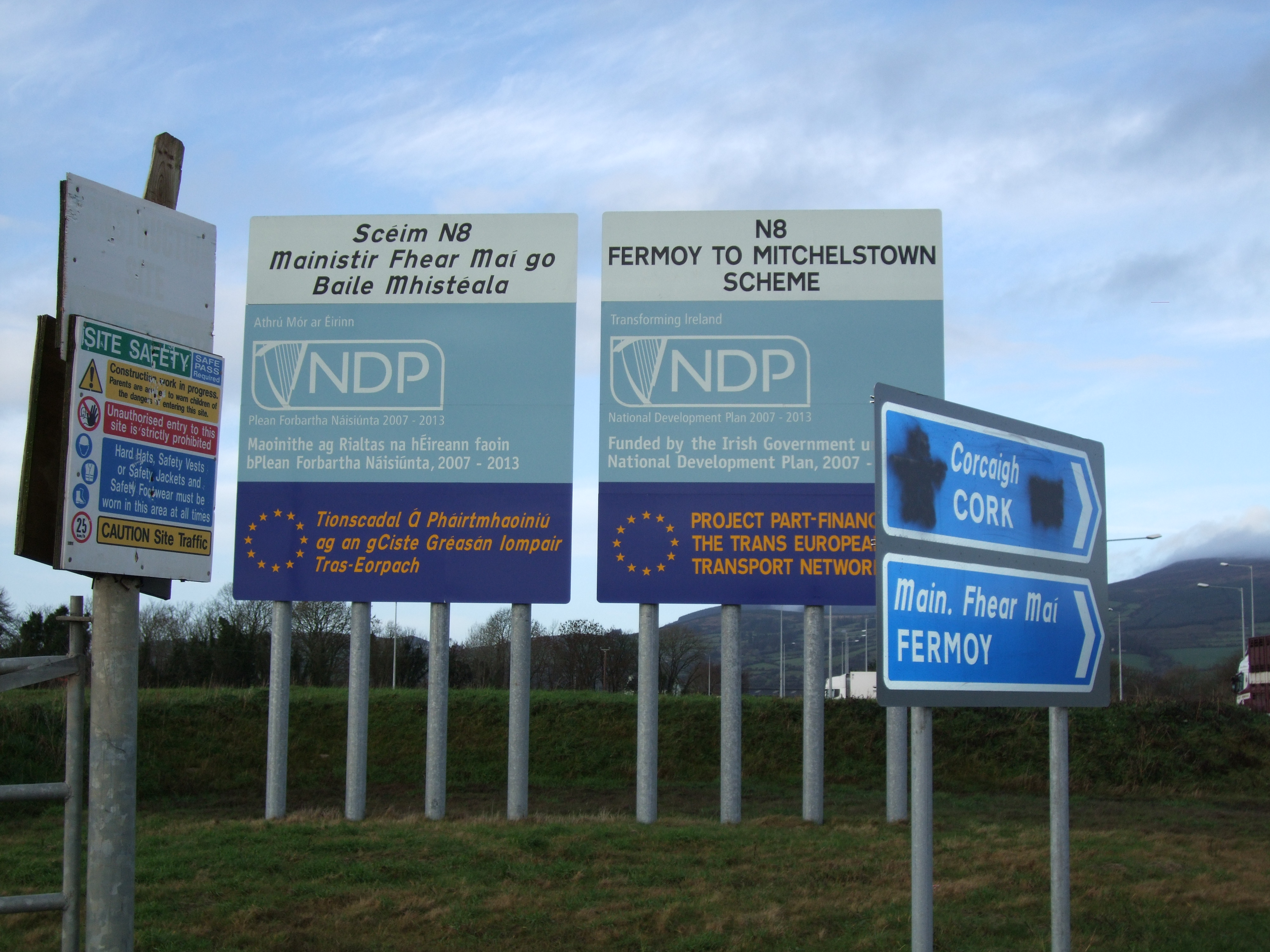
Typical NDP road construction signage erected in 2007.

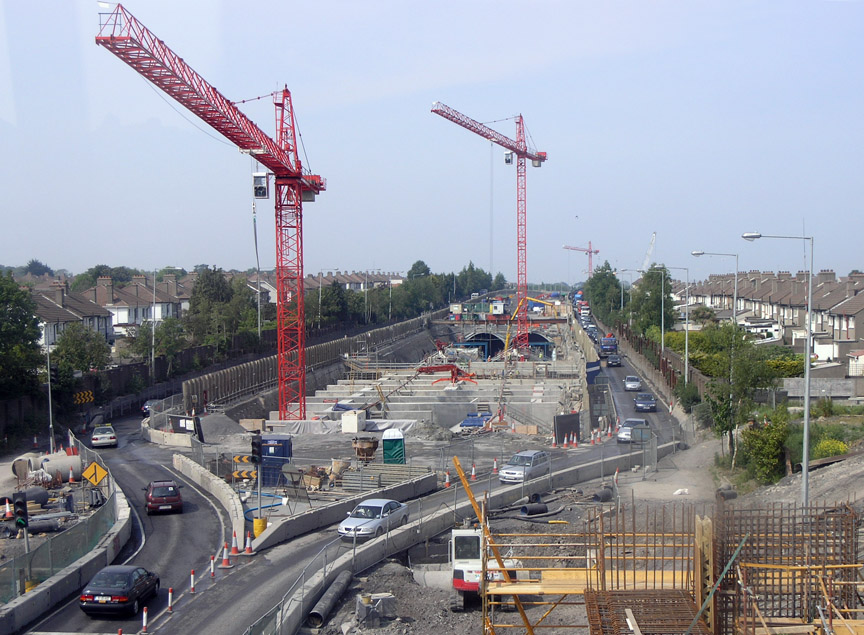
Traffic at the construction site of the Dublin Port Tunnel on the N1/M1.

By the start of 2009 substantial progress had been made on the motorway network, with all sections of the five major inter-urban motorways either under construction or complete. The M1 motorway from Dublin towards Belfast has been completed as far as the border with Northern Ireland. The last section of N1/M1 route to be completed was the motorway/dual carriageway upgrade that crossed the border to become an upgraded A1 route as far as Newry. This was the first cross-border road project and was opened to traffic on 2 August 2007, thus completing the N1/M1 route.

The N7/M7 motorway from Dublin to Limerick was completed in 2010. Major work was undertaken to extend the motorway westwards from Portlaoise to Limerick from 2006 onwards when work on the Nenagh to Limerick section commenced. Construction commenced on the Portlaoise to Castletown section in 2007 while work commenced on the Castletown to Nenagh section in 2008. All sections were completed at various times in 2010. Other upgrades during this period include the Naas road upgrade, which was finished in August 2006. This involved the widening of a section of the route to three lanes in each direction and the removal of several at-grade junctions.

The M4/N4 from Dublin towards Sligo (and providing the link to the N6/M6 for Galway) now reaches as far as the Midlands. By September 2008, the M6 motorway was contiguous from Kinnegad to Athlone. The rest of the M6 route was completed in 2009 as far as Galway (where it will tie in with the proposed M17/M18 schemes). All sections of the M9 motorway to Waterford are also completed. The M9 Carlow bypass element opened in May 2008, while the Waterford-Knocktopher scheme opened in 2010. The M8 Dublin-Cork road motorway moved substantially towards completion in 2008 with the opening of the 37 km Cashel-Mitchelstown scheme and the redesignation of the Cashel bypass to motorway standard. In December 2008, the 40 km M8 Cullahill-Cashel scheme was opened to traffic. All other sections of this route were under construction by late 2007. The 16 km Fermoy to Mitchelstown segment opened to traffic on 25 May 2009. The M8 was completed in 2010 following the opening of the M7/M8 Portlaoise to Castletown/Cullahill route where the M8 intersects with the M7. The N11/M11 is also receiving upgrades along with the new controversial 47 km M3 motorway.

In 2010, upgrade works the now-complete M50 motorway Dublin inner ring road were finalised. The upgrade of parts of the M50 was appended to the NDP. One of the upgrades was the M50 Dublin Port Tunnel project which was a major scheme involving tunnelling from the M1 north of the city centre, through to the Docklands to the east of the city centre. The tunnel was officially opened by the Taoiseach, Bertie Ahern, on 20 December 2006. Other upgrades included the changing of the N4/M50 to a free-flow layout and an upgrade of the motorway to three or four lanes in each direction between many junctions. Works to upgrade the N7/M50 and M1/M50 junctions to free-flow or near free-flow layouts, and to upgrade the rest of the route to three or four-lane motorway were completed in late 2009 and during 2010.

By early 2009, some progress had been made on the Atlantic Corridor, which aims to link Letterkenny to Waterford, via upgrades of the N15, N17, N18, N20 and N25. The upgrade would have seen dual-carriageway/motorway links between Letterkenny and Sligo, Sligo and Galway, Galway and Limerick, Limerick and Cork and Cork and Waterford. In November 2008 work commenced on the 22 km section of the N18 HQDC from Crusheen to Gort. Various other sections of the route are planning stages. The M20 Cork-Limerick route is at public consultation stage and an EIS and motorway order are due to be published around April next year. The M17 from Galway to Tuam, along with the M18 from Gort (which ties in with the aforementioned M17) were completed in 2017. The N25 Waterford City bypass was completed on 19 October 2009, 10 months ahead of schedule. The N25 New Ross bypass was opened in January 2020.

=== Rail network ===
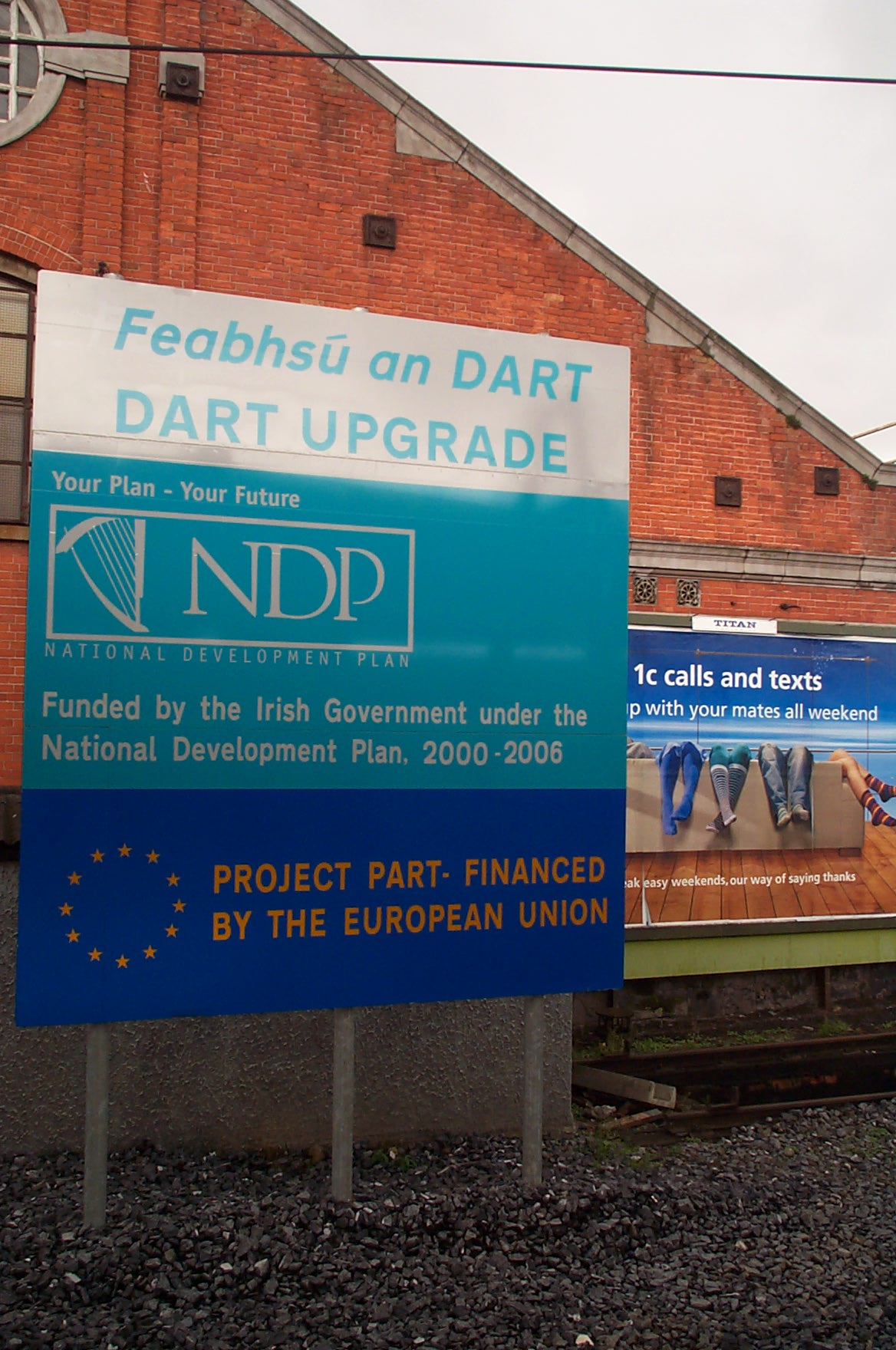
A National Development Plan sign for Dublin Area Rapid Transit seen in Dublin Connolly railway station. This sign was removed in 2011

Dublin suburban routes benefited from large amounts of new rolling stock, in the form of suburban railcars. These operate north to Dundalk, northwest to Maynooth, southwest to Portlaoise and south to Gorey. The electrified section of the north–south route through Dublin had extra EMUs brought into service. Dublin also saw the opening of a new tram system, the Luas in 2004.

Major projects undertaken were the upgrade of Heuston Station in Dublin to nine platforms and the new railcar servicing depot in Drogheda. Many other stations, particularly the Dublin suburban stations, were upgraded and modernised, with lifts for example on new footbridges. Other measures to improve disabled access were implemented, and park and ride facilities were developed.

InterCity travel benefited from new suburban railcars freeing up InterCity rolling stock previously in use. 67 new locomotive-hauled InterCity carriages were introduced in 2006. Over 100 "regional railcars" were ordered, in the form DMUs currently in use on peripheral services that are not commuter-only. Services were increased on routes such as that from Limerick to Ennis.

Planned developments included enhancing suburban rail in Cork, where a section of rail was reopened to Midleton, east of the city. Other projects under discussion, some or all of which are unlikely to be undertaken, include:

- A railway line from Dublin to Navan.
- Developing a rail link to Dublin Airport (possibly as an underground Metro link).
- Opening a new city centre railway terminus for Sligo and western commuter services at Spencer Dock.
- Creating the DART Underground tunnel south from the Docklands railway station in Spencer Dock to Pearse Station and west to Heuston Station.
- Reopening a Western Railway Corridor from Limerick to Sligo. The section from Ennis to Athenry was reopened in 2010, with the sections from Athenry to Tuam, as well as preserving right of way north of Tuam, cancelled indefinitely in 2011.
- Reopening of Limerick-Tralee and Athlone-Mullingar railway lines.

== See also ==
- Transport in Ireland
- Transport 21
- History of roads in Ireland
- Motorways in the Republic of Ireland
