= Bibliography of Irish rail transport =

This is a bibliography for the history of rail transport in Ireland.

== Company histories ==
- 35 Years of NIR 1967 to 2002 - Allen, Jonathon M - 2003, ISBN 1-904242-00-6
- A History of Northern Ireland Railways - Robb, William - 1982
- Ballymena Lines, The - Patterson, Edward M. - 1968, ISBN 0-7153-4183-9
- Patterson, Edward Mervyn (1982) [1958]. Belfast and County Down Railway. Newton Abbot: David & Charles. ISBN 0-7153-8306-X. OCLC 16552845.
- Coakham, Desmond (2010). The Belfast & County Down Railway. Newtownards: Colourpoint Books. ISBN 9781906578732. OCLC 709406911.
- Bessbrook & Newry Tramway, The - Newham, Alan T. - 1979
- Shepherd, Ernie (2005). Cork, Bandon & South Coast Railway. Hinckley: Midland Publishing. ISBN 1-85780-198-9. OCLC 57062763.
- Cork & Macroom Direct Railway, The - Creedon, Colm - 1960
- Derry Central Railway, The - McIlfatrick, James - 1987
- Hamilton, Michael (1997). Down Memory Line, Sligo Leitrim & Northern Counties Railway. Manorhamilton: Drumlin Publications. ISBN 1-873437-18-8.
- Dublin & Blessington Tramway, The - Fayle, Harold - 1963
- Dublin & Lucan Tramway, The - Newham, A.T. - 1964
- Dublin & South Eastern Railway, The - Shepherd, Ernie - 1974, ISBN 0-7153-6361-1
- Shepherd, Ernest W. (1974). The Dublin & South Eastern Railway. Newton Abbott: David & Charles. ISBN 0715363611. OCLC 1200293527. OL 5108145M.
- Shepherd, Ernest W.; Beesley, Gerry (2003) [1998]. The Dublin and South Eastern Railway: An Illustrated History. Leicester, Shepperton: Midland Publishing. ISBN 1-85780-082-6.
- Dundalk Newry & Greenore Railway, The - Barrie, D.S.M. - 1957
- O'Sullivan, Patrick (2003a). The Farranfore to Valencia Harbour Railway. Vol. 1, Planning, construction and an outline of operation. United Kingdom: Oakwood Press. ISBN 0853616043. OCLC 59271781.
- O'Sullivan, Patrick (2003b). The Farranfore to Valencia Harbour Railway. Vol. 2, The life of the line : its train services, locomotives and personalities. United Kingdom: Oakwood Press. ISBN 0853616108. OCLC 59279380.
- Forty Shades Of Steam - Cassells, Joe - 2004, ISBN 1-904242-26-X
- Giant's Causeway, Portrush & Bush Valley Railway & Tramway Co. Limited - McGuigan, John - 1983, ISBN 0-902588-10-9
- Giant's Causeway Tramway, The - McGuigan, J.H. - 1964, ISBN 0-85361-294-3
- Patterson, Edward Mervyn (2003) [1962]. The Great Northern Railway (Ireland). Railway History. Vol. OL67. Usk: Oakwood Press. ISBN 9780853616023. OCLC 53393781.
- Bairstow, Martin (2006). Railways in Ireland. Vol. Part One: Great Northern, ... Martin Bairstow. ISBN 1871944317. OCLC 1179437852.
- Bairstow, Martin (2007). Railways in Ireland. Vol. Part Two:Belfast and County Down, ... Martin Bairstow. ISBN 978-1871944334. OCLC 931393119.
- Bairstow, Martin (2009). Railways in Ireland. Vol. Part Three: Dublin & South Eastern, ... Martin Bairstow. ISBN 978-1871944365. OCLC 931187186.
- Bairstow, Martin (2011). Railways in Ireland. Vol. Part Four:Great Southern & Western. Martin Bairstow. ISBN 9781871944402. OCLC 931146103.
- Bairstow, Martin (2012). Railways in Ireland. Vol. Part Five:Cork, Bandon & South Coast, ... Martin Bairstow. ISBN 978-1871944426. OCLC 931336727.
- Murray, K. A.; McNeill, D. B. (1976). The Great Southern & Western Railway. Irish Record Railway Society. ISBN 0904078051. OCLC 3069424.
- Hill of Howth Tramway, The - Flewitt, R.C. - 1968
- Ireland's First Railway - Murray, Kevin A. - 1981, ISBN 0-904078-07-8
- Listowel & Ballybunion Railway, The - Newham, A.T. - 1989, ISBN 0-85361-376-1
- Lough Swilly Railway, The - Patterson, Edward M. - 1988, ISBN 0-7153-9167-4
- Shepherd, W. Ernest (1994). The Midland Great Western Railway of Ireland: An Illustrated History. Leicester: Midland Publishing. ISBN 1-85780-008-7. OCLC 32627031.
- NCC Centenary celebrations - LMS (Northern Counties Committee) - 1948
- Northern Counties Railway Vol. 1, The - Currie J.R.L. - 1973, ISBN 0-7153-5934-7
- Northern Counties Railway Vol. 2, The - Currie J.R.L. - 1974, ISBN 0-7153-6530-4
- On the Move Córas Iompair Éireann 1945 - 95 - O'Riain, Michael - 1995, ISBN 0-7171-2342-1
- Portstewart Tramway, The - Currie, J.R.L. - 1968
- Sprinks, N.W. (1970). Sligo, Leitrim and Northern Counties Railway. Billericay: Irish Railway Record Society (London Area).
- Sligo Leitrim & Northern Counties - Sprinks, N.W. - 1981
- Fryer, C.E.J. (2000). The Waterford & Limerick Railway. Oakwood Press. ISBN 0-85361-543-8.
- Shepherd, Ernie (2006). Waterford Limerick & Western Railway. Ian Allan Publishing. ISBN 0-7110-3147-9. OL 7791170M.
- Waterford & Tramore Railway, The - Fayle, Harold - 1972, ISBN 0-7153-5518-X
- Tralee & Dingle Railway - Whitehouse, P.B.

== Biographies ==
- Fifty Years of Railway Life in England, Scotland and Ireland - Tatlow, Joseph -
- Irish Railway bibliography at Project Gutenberg
- Hard Lines: A Damned Close Run Thing - Alexander, Bob - 1989, Lurgan, County Armagh:Inglewood Press
- Man of No Property - Andrews, C.S. - 2001, ISBN 1-901866-66-1
- Chacksfield, John E. (2010). Richard Maunsell - An Engineering Biography (revised ed.). Usk: Oakwood Press. ISBN 9780853616955. OCLC 658650402.
- Chacksfield, John E. (18 April 2003). The Coey/Cowie Brothers: All Railwaymen. Oakwood Press. ISBN 978-0853616054. OCLC 55130220.
- The Man from the Railway - McNally, James P. - 1992, ISBN 1-897685-99-8
- William Martin Murphy - Morrissey, Thomas - 1997, ISBN 0-85221-132-5
- William Trail - Brown, Martin - 1995, ISBN 0-85640-551-5

== Locomotives and trains ==
- 101 Class Locomotives of the GS&WR - Flanagan, P.J. - 1966
- Rowledge, J. W. P. (1995). A Regional History of Railways. Vol. 16 – Ireland. Penryn: Atlantic Transport Publishers. ISBN 0-906899-63-X. OCLC 164930974.
- Administration (CIE) - Institute of Public Administration - 1968
- "All Change" The Social Impact of the Railways - Ulster Folk & Transport Museum - 2004, ISBN 0-9511562-3-3
- ABC Irish Locomotives 1949 - Ian Allan - 2000, ISBN 0-7110-2767-6
- Bulleid and the Turf Burner - Shepherd, Ernie - 2004, ISBN 0-9542035-8-5
- By Rail Through The Heart Of Ireland - O'Farrell, Padraic - 1990, ISBN 0-85342-948-0
- Centenary Booklet - Permanent Way Institution - 1984
- Customs Requirements Traffic from Great Britain to the Irish Free State and Northern Ireland - Railway Clearing House - 1935
- Derry Road, The - Fitzgerald, J.D. - 1995, ISBN 1-898392-09-9
- Diesel Dawn - Flanagan, Colm - 2003, ISBN 1-904242-08-1
- Ireland Hand Book of Railway Distances - Browning, Walter - 1884
- Ireland's Railway Heritage - Ryan, Gregg - 2002, ISBN 0-9542721-0-2
- Irish Industrial and Contractors' Locomotives - Cole, D. - 1962
- Irish Commercial & Railway Gazetteer, The - Leggatt, J.E. - 1879
- Irish Locomotives and Rolling Stock - Irish Traction Group - 1997, ISBN 0-947773-59-2
- Irish Metro Vick Diesels - Carse, Barry - 1996, ISBN 1-898392-15-3
- Irish Narrow Gauge, The - Prideaux, J.D.C.A. - 1981, ISBN 0-7153-8071-0
- Irish Narrow Gauge In Colour, The - Johnston, Norman - 2003, ISBN 1-904242-13-8
- Irish Narrow Gauge Railways - Baker, Michael H.C. - 1999, ISBN 0-7110-2680-7
- Irish Narrow Gauge Scale Drawings - Lloyd, David - 1988, ISBN 0-9513300-0-4
- Ferris, Tom (1993). From Cork to Cavan. The Irish Narrow Gauage: a pictorial history. Vol. 1. Midland Publishing. ISBN 1-85780-010-9. OCLC 60012260.
- Ferris, Tom (1993). Ulster Lines. The Irish Narrow Gauage: a pictorial history. Vol. 2. Midland Publishing. ISBN 1-85780-010-9. OCLC 60012260.
- Irish Railway Album - Boocock, C.P. - 1968, ISBN 0-7110-0043-3
- Irish Railway Collection, The - Ulster Folk & Transport Museum - 1994, ISBN 0-902588-52-4
- Irish Railway Collection, The - Ulster Folk & Transport Museum - 1993, ISBN 0-902588-50-8
- Boocock, Colin (1997). Irish Railways 40 years of change. Cornwall: Atlantic Publishers. ISBN 0-906899-75-3. OCLC 41329412.
- Irish Railways in Colour - Ferris, Tom - ISBN 1-85780-000-1
- Irish Railways in Colour A Second Glance - Ferris, Tom - 1995, ISBN 1-85780-019-2
- Irish Railways in Pictures No 1 GNR(I) - Irish Railway Records Society London Area - 1976
- Irish Railways in Pictures No 2 MGWR - Irish Railway Records Society London Area
- Irish Railways in Pictures No 3 Cork - Irish Railway Records Society London Area - 1976, ISBN 0-902564-06-4
- Irish Railways in Pictures No 4 Giants Causeway - Pollard, Mike - 2000, ISBN 0-902564-07-2
- Irish Railways in the heyday of steam - Casserley, H.C. - ISBN 0-85153-347-7
- Irish Railways Past & Present Vol 1 - Baker, Michael H.C. - 1995, ISBN 1-85895-046-5
- Baker, Michael H. C. (1972). Irish Railways since 1916. Shepperton: Ian Allan. ISBN 0711002827. OCLC 248259641.
- Irish Railways Today, Pender, Brendan & Herbert Richards - 1967
- Irish Railways Traction & Travel - Irish Traction Group
- Middlemass, Tom (1981). Irish Standard Gauge Railways. David & Charles. ISBN 0-7153-8007-9. OCLC 993305466.
- Nock, O.S. (1982). Irish steam : a twenty-year survey, 1920-1939. Newton Abbott and Pomfret, Vermont: David & Charles. ISBN 0715379615. OCLC 9802320.
- Rowledge, J. W. Peter (1993). Irish Steam Loco Register. Stockport, England: Irish Traction Group. ISBN 9780947773335. OCLC 30815253.
- Irish Trams - Kilroy, James - 1996, ISBN 1-898392-02-1
- Ironing the Land - O'Connor, Kevin - 1999, ISBN 0-7171-2747-8
- LMS in Ireland, The - Kennedy, Mark - 2000, ISBN 1-85780-097-4
- Locomotive & Train Working in the Latter Part of the Nineteenth Century - Ahrons, E.L. - 1954
- Locomotives & Railcars of Bord Na Mona - Johnson, Stephen - 1996, 1857800451
- Locomotives & Rolling Stock of Irish Rail and Northern Irish Railways - Doyle, Oliver - 1987, ISBN 0-906591-04-X
- Scott, William T. (2008). Locomotives of the LMS NCC and its predecessors. Newtownards, County Down: Colorprint. ISBN 9781904242840. OCLC 506214865.
- Boocock, Colin (1 October 2009). Locomotive Compendium Ireland (1st ed.). Hersham: Ian Allan. ISBN 9780711033603. OCLC 423592044.
- Clements, Jeremy; McMahon, Michael (2008). Locomotives of the GSR. Newtownards: Colourpoint Books. ISBN 9781906578268. OCLC 547074718.
- Clements, Jeremy; McMahon, Michael; O'Rourke, Alan (2020). Locomotives of the Great Southern and Western Railway. County Louth: Collon Publishing. ISBN 9781527270282.
- Narrow Gauge Railways of Ireland - Fayle, Harold - 1946
- Narrow Gauge Railways of Ireland - Kidner, R.W. - 1971
- Arnold, Robert McCullough (1973). NCC Saga : the LMS in Northern Ireland. Newton Abbot: David & Charles. ISBN 0-7153-7131-2. OCLC 16256841.
- Northern Ireland Tours & Excursions - Ulster Transport Authority - 1949
- Off the Beaten Track - Cronin, Kevin - 1996, ISBN 0-86281-563-0
- Off The Rails - Ogle, Brendan - 2003, ISBN 1-85607-906-6
- Mulligan, Fergus (1990) [1983]. One Hundred and Fifty Years of Irish Railways. Belfast: Appletree Press. ISBN 9780862812331. OCLC 20525095.
- Casserley, H. C. (1974). Outline of Irish Railway History. Newton Abbot & North Pomfret: David & Charles. ISBN 0715363778. OCLC 249227042.
- Railway Age in Ireland, The - Ulster Folk & Transport Museum - 1994, ISBN 0-902588-52-4
- Railway Age in Ireland, The - Ulster Folk & Transport Museum - ISBN 0-902588-36-2
- Railway History: Ireland Volume 1 - McCutcheon, Alan - 1969, ISBN 0-7153-4651-2
- Railway History: Ireland Volume 2 - McCutcheon, Alan - 1969, ISBN 0-7153-4998-8
- Railway Lines of CIE & NIR - Doyle, Oliver & Stephen Hirsch - 1985
- Winchester, C. (2014). Railways of Ireland. Gloucester: Amberley Publishing. ISBN 9781445640396. (Note: Publication has some content from Wikipedia and should be used with care as a source Wikipedia source") (Note: Publication may contain copies of content that is available elsewhere online under Public Domain or other suitable license)
- Railway Policy on the Right Rails? - CIE - 1986
- Railways in Ireland 1834 - 1984 - Doyle, Oliver & Stephen Hirsch - 1983
- Share issues of the Great Southern Railway of Ireland - Jenkins, Peter R. - 1997, ISBN 1-870177-40-1
- Some Industrial Railways of Ireland - McGrath, Walter - 1959
- State Railways for Ireland - Fabian Society - 1908
- Station Masters, The - Ryan, Gregg - 2000
- Steam Age In Ireland, The - O'Neill, The Lord - 2004, ISBN 1-904242-35-9
- Steam at Mallow - Yearbook of the Great Southern Railway Preservation Society - 1984
- Steam at Mallow - Yearbook of the Great Southern Railway Preservation Society - 1986/87
- Steam's Last Fling - Stevenson, Michael R - 2000, ISBN 1-898392-62-5
- Sunny Side of Ireland, The - Great Southern & Western Railway - 1895
- Tables for calculating rates between places in Great Britain and Places in Ireland - Railway Clearing House - 1927
- Taisteal agus Iompair in Eirinn - Mac Giolla Chomhaill Anraí - 1974
- Transport in Ireland 1880 - 1910 - Flanagan, Patrick - 1969
- Transport Preservation in Ireland 1980/81 - Parks, David - 1980
- Transport Preservation in Ireland 2005 - McGlynn Parks, David - 2005

== Philatelic ==
- An Post Dublin Belfast - 2005
- Irish TPOs, Their History and Postmarks - Ward, C.W.

== Local history ==
- O'Donoghue, Frank (2012). 5-Minute Bell: History of the Tramore Train 1853-1960, The -. Frank O'Donoghue. ISBN 9780957448407.
- A Nostalgic Look at Belfast Trams since 1945 - Maybin, Mike - ISBN 1-85794-030-X
- Sinclair, Ian McLarnon (2009) [2002]. Along Uta Lines — Ulster's Rail Transport in the 1960's (2 ed.). Newtownards: Colourpoint Books. ISBN 9781906578497. OCLC 1280784854. OL 32804763M.
- Along UTA Lines - Ulster's Rail Network In The 1960s - Sinclair, Ian McLarnon - 2002, ISBN 1-898392-77-3
- Athlone Railway 1851 - 2001 - Gately, Bridie - 2001
- Cochrane, Gerry (2009). Back in Steam : The Downpatrick and County Down Railway from 1982. Colourpoint Books. ISBN 9781906578299. OCLC 520651212. OL 31298097M.
- Belfast & County Down Railway An Irish Railway Pictorial, The - Coakham, Desmond - 1998, ISBN 1-85780-076-1
- Belfast Corporation Tramways, 1905 - 1954 - Maybin, J.M. - 1981, ISBN 0-900433-83-3
- Belfast's Lost Tramways - Maybin, Mike - 2003, ISBN 1-84033-277-8
- Bellevue Express, The - McFetridge, Stewart - 1995
- Bygone Days on Fermanagh Railways - Love, Kevin - 2003
- Call Us Back To Donegal - Piercy, John - 2000, ISBN 0-9514715-9-7
- Cavan & Leitrim Railway An Irish Railway Pictorial, The - Ferris, Tom - 1997, ISBN 1-85780-073-7
- Cavehill Waggon Line, The - McFetridge, Stewart - 1999
- Claremorris to Collooney Railway - Swinford Historical Society - 1996
- Connemara Railway, The - Villiers Tuthill, Kathleen - 2003
- Cork City Railway Stations, 1985, Colm Creedon, 1986
- Cork and Macroom Direct Railway (the) Colm Creedon, 1960 (out of print)
- County Armagh Railway Album - McKee, Eddie - 1996
- County Down, The - Arnold, R.M. - 1981
- Crossing The Boyne: the Great Viaduct 1855 - 2005 - Share, Bernard - 2005, ISBN 0-9542721-3-7
- Dingle Train, The - Rowlands, David - 1996, ISBN 1-871980-27-5
- Down Line - Belfast & County Down Railway Museum Trust - 1999, ISBN 0-905196-03-1
- Down Memory Line - Hamilton, Michael - 1997, ISBN 1-873437-18-8
- Fermanagh's Railways - Friel, Charles P. - 1998, ISBN 1-898392-39-0
- Fintona Horse Tram, The - Johnston, Norman - 1992, ISBN 0-9517175-1-0
- G.A.A. Excursion Trains, Colm Creedon 1984
- Gone but not forgotten Belfast Trams 1872 - 1954 - Railway Preservation Society of Ireland & Irish Transport Trust - 1980
- Harcourt Street Line - Back On Track - Mac Aongusa, Brian - 2003, ISBN 1-85607-907-4
- Howth and her trams - Kilroy, James - 1986, ISBN 1-85186-010-X
- Human Frailty and the 1871 Ballymacarrett Rail Accident - Haines, Keith - 2002
- Lartigue, The - Guerin, Michael - 1989, ISBN 0-9513549-1-4
- Last years of the Wee Donegal 1950-59, The - Robotham, Robert - 1998, ISBN 1-898392-42-0
- Londonderry & Lough Swilly Railway, The - Boyd, J.I.C. - 1981, ISBN 0-85153-447-3
- Londonderry & Lough Swilly Railway A visitors guide, The - Bell, Dave - ISBN 1-874518-02-5
- Londonderry & Lough Swilly Railway An Irish Railway Pictorial, The - Flanders, Steve - 1997, ISBN 1-85780-074-5
- Lost Railways of Co. Antrim - Johnson, Stephen - 2002, ISBN 1-84033-193-3
- Lost Railways of Co. Cork - Johnson, Stephen - 2005, ISBN 1-84033-331-6
- Lost Railways of Co. 'Derry - Johnson, Stephen - 2002, ISBN 1-84033-199-2
- Lost Railways of Co. Down and Co. Armagh - Johnson, Stephen - 2002, ISBN 1-84033-176-3
- Lost Railways of Co. Dublin and the South East - Johnson, Stephen - 2005, ISBN 1-84033-334-0
- Lost Railways of Co. Co. Tyrone and Co. Fermanagh - Johnson, Stephen - 2002, ISBN 1-84033-200-X
- Main Line Railways of Northern Ireland - McCormick, W.P. - 1948
- Newry Railways in Pictures, The - McKee, Eddie - 1994
- Rails Around Belfast - Crockart, Andrew - 2004, ISBN 1-85780-167-9
- Rails Around Dublin - Murray, Donal - 2002, ISBN 1-85780-144-X
- Rails to Achill - Beaumont, Jonathan - 2002, ISBN 0-85361-588-8
- Beaumont, Jonathan (18 September 2021). Rails through Connemara: the Galway-Clifden railway. Locomotion papers. Oakwood Press. ISBN 9780853617594. OCLC 1263340905.
- Railway Days in Strabane - Strabane WEA - ISBN 0-9507812-5-8
- Railway Engineering Works - CIE
- Railway Town, The - McQuillan, Jack
- Railways Around County Armagh - McKee, Eddie - 1990
- Railways in Ulster - Morton, Grenfell - 1989 - ISBN 0-946872-26-0
- Railways of Ireland Past and Present Dublin, The - Baker, Michael H.C. - 1997, ISBN 1-85895-128-3
- Railways of Northern Ireland and their Locomotives, The - McCormick, W.P. - 1946
- Reflections on Munster Railways - Limerick Museum - 1984
- Rules and Regulations GNR(I) - 1914
- Rules and Regulations GS&WR - 1927
- Runaway Train, The - Currie, J.R.L. -1971, ISBN 0-7153-5198-2
- Sligo Leitrim & Northern Counties Railway An Irish Railway Pictorial - Sprinks, Neil - 2001 - ISBN 1-85780-112-1
- Standard Gauge Railways in the North of Ireland - Morton, R.G. - 1965
- Steam Locomotives Of The Ulster Transport Authority - Pue, R.J.A. - 1997, ISBN 1-900612-00-3
- Story of the Drumm Battery Train, The - Ring, Roddy
- Three Foot Gauge Railways of Northern Ireland - Kidner, R.W. - 1950
- Through Streets Broad and Narrow - Corcoran, Michael - 2000, ISBN 1-85780-110-5
- Corcoran, Michael (2008). Through Streets Broad and Narrow — Dublin's Trams. The Sir John T. Gilbert Commemorative Lecture. Dublin City Public Libraries. ISBN 9780946841912. OCLC 226974337. OL 31937072M.
- Through the Hils of Donegal - Carroll, Joe - ISBN 1-874518-00-9
- Tours in North of Ireland - Belfast & Northern Counties Railway - 1893
- Train to Howth, The - Hurley, Michael J. - 1996
- Tralee & Dingle Railway, The - Rowlands, David G. - 1977, ISBN 0-85153-267-5
- Trams to the Hill of Howth - Kilroy, James - 1998, ISBN 1-898392-13-7
- Turf Burner, The - Ireland's Last Steam Locomotive Design - Rowledge, J.W.P. - 1972
- Twenty Five Years Gone - Pue, R.J.A. - 1975 - ISBN 0-905196-00-7
- Ulster from the Carriage Window - Robb, William - 1986
- Ulster Tramways & Light Railways - McNeill, D.B. - 1956
- UTA Train Signalling regulations - Ulster Transport Authority - 1952
- Warrenpoint Branch, The - Fitzgerald, Des - 1996, ISBN 1-898392-14-5
- Wee Donegal Revisited, The - Robotham, Robert - 2002, ISBN 1-904242-02-2
- West Clare Railway, The - Taylor, Patrick - 1994, ISBN 1-871980-16-X
- West Clare Railway - An Irish Railway Pictorial, The - Taylor, Joe - 2002, ISBN 1-85780-122-9
- When the Train Came to Mullingar - 1998
- Works, The - Ryan, Gregg - 1996
- Works "Open Day", The - Irish Rail - 1996

== General (with some Irish interest) ==
- Atmospheric Railways - Hadfield, Charles - 1967
- British & Irish Tramways since 1945 - Waller, Michael H
- Browne and Theobalds Law of Railways - 1899
- Father Browne's Trains and Railways - O'Donnell, E.E. - 2004, ISBN 1-85607-916-3
- Institution of Mechanical Engineers Proceedings - Institution of Mechanical Engineers - 1888
- Light Railways of Éire IOM and Channel Islands, The - Kidner, R.W. - 1949
- Railway Accidents of Great Britain and Europe - Schneider, Ascanio - 1968, ISBN 0-7153-5639-9
- Railways And The State, The - Pim, Frederic - 1912
- Railways of Great Britain and Ireland - Whishaw, Francis - 1969, ISBN 0-7153-4786-1
- Through the Cities - Barry, Michael - 1991, ISBN 0-9510696-3-2

== General Irish (with some railway interest) ==
- Civil Engineering Heritage Ireland - Cox, Ron C. - 1998, ISBN 0-7277-2627-7
- Ireland's Bridges - Cox, Ron - 2003, ISBN 0-86327-864-7
- Industrial Archaeology of County Down, The - Green, E.R.R. - 1963
- Industrial Archaeology of Northern Ireland, The - McCutcheon, W.A. - 1980, ISBN 0-337-08154-9
- Industrial Archaeology of Cork City & its Environs, The - Rynne, Colin - 1999, ISBN 0-7076-6795-X
- Industrial Heritage of North-East Ireland - Industrial Heritage Association of Ireland - 2002, ISBN 0-9532706-2-9
- Lagan Valley 1800 1850, The - Green, E.R.R. - 1949
- Power from Steam - Industrial Heritage Association of Ireland - 1998, ISBN 0-9532706-1-0
- Rail versus Road in Ireland 1900 - 2000 - Collins, Michael - 2000 - ISBN 1-898392-37-4
- Road versus Rail - Greer, P.E.
- Shane's Castle Railway and Nature Reserve - Barzilay, David - 1975
- Transport in Ards Borough in the 20th Century - McDonald, Brian - ????

== Reports (excluding company annual reports) ==
- A Review of Railway Safety in Ireland - International Risk Management Services - 1998
- A Review of Railway Safety in Ireland: Implementation Review - International Risk Management Services - 2000
- A Review of Railway Safety in Ireland: Summary - International Risk Management Services - 1998
- Accident Report: Hilden - HMSO - 1985, ISBN 0-11-550695-0
- Cahir Rail Accident Report - Grimes, Michael - 2003
- CDRRS Business Plan - Tee, Neil
- Dublin LRT EIS - CIE
- Dublin LRT EIS Line A - CIE
- Ecological Report on Barnagh Tunnel - GST Ltd - 2002
- Joint Committee on State Sponsored Bodies: CIE - Government Publications Office - 1979
- LUAS Advisory Group 3rd Report
- LUAS Advisory Group 4th Report
- LUAS Advisory Group 5th Report
- LUAS Advisory Group 6th Report
- Report on The Railroad Constructed From Kingstown To Dalkey in Ireland Upon The Atmospheric System - Mallet, Robert - 1844
- Report On Transport In Ireland - 1948
- Strategic Rail Review - Booz Allen Hamilton - 2003, ISBN 0-7557-1547-0
- Western Rail Corridor - West on Track - 2004

== Maps ==
- A Railway Atlas of Ireland - Hajducki, S Maxwell - David & Charles - 1974, ISBN 0-7153-5167-2
- Johnsons Atlas and Gazetteer of the Railways of Ireland - Johnson, Stephen - 1997, ISBN 1-85780-044-3
- National Atlas Showing Canals Navigable Rivers Mineral Tramroads Railways and Street Tramways Ireland - Crowther, G.L. - 1989, ISBN 0-948850-78-7
- Official Railway Map of Ireland, Emslie, J and Emslie, W - Railway Clearing House - 1897
- Official Railway Map of Ireland, ''Emslie, J and Emslie, W - Railway Clearing House - 1902
- Official Railway Map of Ireland - Railway Clearing House - 1918
- Rail Atlas Great Britain & Ireland - Baker, Stuart K - 1996, ISBN 0-86093-534-5
- Railway Clearing House Junction Diagrams - Railway Clearing House - 1915
- Railway Track Diagrams Ireland - Yonge, John - 2004, ISBN 1-898319-68-5
- W & A K Johnston's Map Of The Railway Systems Of Ireland - W & AK Johnston - 1914

== Society journals ==
- "An Mhuc Dubh" (1–5). Cumann Traenach Gaeltacht Láir. 1993–1997.
- "Five Foot Three". The Railway Preservation Society of Ireland. 1965–.
- "The Irish Mail". The Irish Traction Group. 1989–.
- "The Journal of the Irish Railway Record Society". Irish Railway Record Society. 1946–.

== Irish Railway News (Southern Railways) ==
- Irish Railway News 2.1, 2.2, 2.3, 2.4 - 1994
- Irish Railway News 3.1, 3.2, 3.3 - 1995
- Irish Railway News 4.1, 4.2 - 1996
- Irish Railway News 5.1 - 1997
- Irish Railway News 6.1 - 1999
