= DART Underground =

Proposed rail tunnel cross-connecting public transport in Dublin, Ireland

Overview
- Status: Deferred (as of late 2021)
- Owner: Iarnród Éireann
- Locale: Dublin city centre
- Termini: Clontarf; Inchicore

Service
- Type: Rapid transit
- System: DART

History
- Planned opening: "After 2042"

Technical
- Track gauge: 1,600 mm (5 ft 3 in)
- Electrification: 1,500 V DC overhead catenary

DART Underground (Irish: DART Faoi Thalamh), also known as the Interconnector or DART+ Tunnel, is a proposed heavy-rail tunnel in Dublin, Ireland. First proposed in 1972, as of 2021 it was not funded or scheduled. While the Greater Dublin Transport Strategy 2016-2035 (published in 2016) included the DART Underground as a proposed National Transport Authority project, the tunnel was not included in the National Development Plan published in 2018 or DART+ expansion plans published in August 2020.

The original plans, which proposed an expansion of the electrified Dublin Area Rapid Transit (DART) network, projected the development of a tunnel between Heuston Station and Pearse Station. It had been planned to leave an existing line, via the Phoenix Park Tunnel, idle in the event of the scheme being built. This line however was subsequently reopened, connecting Heuston station with Dublin's Docklands - a cross-city connection which the DART Underground scheme was supposed to achieve. Accordingly, when the Irish Government published a new national spatial strategy in 2018, the revised plans dropped the DART Underground scheme in favour of these existing lines. Having previously secured planning consent, the project was initially deferred until after 2016, and by 2015, it had been announced that the project would be redrafted to a lower cost design. In October 2016, a "scaled down" plan was published with a potential commencement date "in 2020". As of September 2017 however, it was suggested that the developments would be deferred until after 2030, with the National Transport Authority undertaking a review of the project and its route; this review projected to complete sometime between 2018 and 2027. While the planned alignment was to be preserved, it was announced in November 2021 that DART Underground would not proceed in the period 2022–2042.

== History ==
DART Underground was first proposed in 1972 in the "Transportation in Dublin" study conducted by An Foras Forbartha, an anteceding body to Forfás as an underground rail link to connect Dublin's three main railway stations. In 1975, CIÉ commissioned the "Dublin Rapid Rail Transportation Study" (DRRTS), which recommended a four-phase plan including a prototypical Dart Underground:

- Phase 1 - Upgrade and electrify Howth – Bray (completed 1984 as the DART).
- Phase 2 - An underground line from Connolly to Heuston. Rapid Transit tracks Heuston to Clondalkin overground. Spur to Tallaght from Clondalkin (partially completed in 2010 when Rapid Transit tracks were installed either side of Clondalkin).
- Phase 3 - A short northerly spur off the Maynooth line to Blanchardstown and a short southerly spur to Broadstone (never completed).
- Phase 4 - A tunnel from Broadstone to Sandymount (later redesigned as Metro North before being shelved indefinitely in 2011).

The DRRTS, if completed as envisaged in 1975, would have resulted in a cross shaped pair of tunnels in the city centre meeting at a central station in Temple Bar.

The next plan, proposed in 2001 as an "Interconnector", was included in the Platform For Change strategy report issued by the now defunct Dublin Transportation Office (DTO).

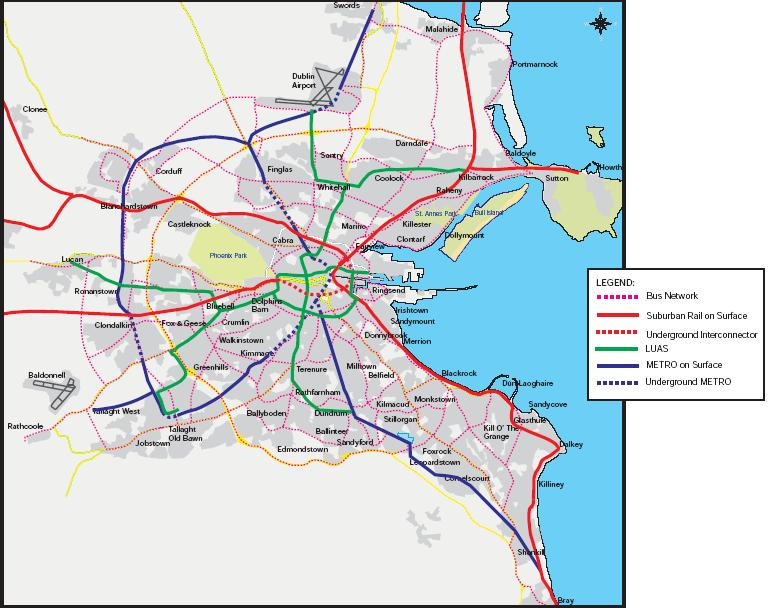
Platform For Change scheme published by the DTO November 2001

A Railway Order permitting the construction of the project was granted in December 2011 by An Bord Pleanála. In August 2014, then Minister for Transport Paschal Donohoe TD was told that both the Dart Underground and Metro North projects would have had to rely on private funding if they were to be built. In 2010, the estimated projected cost for DART Underground was €4 billion, more than half of which was expected to be provided by a public private partnership arrangement. Donohoe was told he had to decide on whether to proceed with DART Underground by 24 September 2015, by which time the Railway Order and planning approval would expire. A High Court ruling reduced the period for which compulsory purchase order notices could be issued from seven years to 18 months. The National Transport Authority's Greater Dublin Area draft Transport Strategy 2016–2035, published in October 2015, expressed the desire to see the tunnel completed as part of the overall DART extension programme.

== Delays and status ==
In May 2010, Iarnród Éireann anticipated that, if construction had begun in 2012, the tunnel would have been operational by 2018. In June 2010, Iarnród Éireann submitted an application to An Bord Pleanála for a Railway Order for the scheme under the Transport (Railway Infrastructure) Act 2001.

In November 2011, the government deferred funding the project due to the decrease in capital spending until 2016 at the earliest. A month later, in December 2011, a Railway Order was granted for the development. The granting of the Railway Order covered the construction of the scheme and any necessary compulsory acquisition of property, but did not commit funding to the project.

In September 2015, it was announced that the project had been cancelled in favour of a simpler alternative. However, it was planned to return as part of a future DART Expansion Programme, to potentially start no earlier than 2020 or 2021.

As of 2016, the National Transport Authority (NTA) was reviewing the project. By September 2017, it was suggested that this review would complete during 2018, and that -depending on the outcome of the review- works on the project would not commence until at least 2020. Revised projections suggested that it would be at least "2030 before passengers could use the new line".

By April 2018, the Irish Independent reported that the DART underground plans had been "dropped [..] completely in favour of four new stations at ground level". Later in 2018, the then Minister for Transport stated that the review of the project's plans and route (by the NTA) would complete during the period of the 2018-2027 National Development Plan. The project was not included in the DART+ expansion plans published in August 2020.

In April 2021, the project was reportedly "being resurrected" but in November 2021 the NTA stated that the DART Underground / Interconnector would not proceed until after 2042, although they would "preserve and protect an alignment to allow its future delivery". Other Luas projects and Metrolink also had new timings assigned.

A version of the project was included in the All-Island Strategic Rail Review, commissioned jointly by the governments of the Republic of Ireland and Northern Ireland and published in July 2024, albeit recommending an altered possible route – via Tara Street instead of Pearse.

== Opposition ==
During 2010 there was opposition to the project in Dublin's East Wall area, where the tunnel would have begun and where tunnelling operations were planned to be located. Complaints were exacerbated by the suggestion that, while they would have had to endure the disturbance created by the tunneling works, East Wall residents would not gain anything from the project as they would not have easy access to a DART station - since they were roughly halfway (20 minutes walk) between the Clontarf Road and Docklands stations. Complaints were also raised by residents at a Western entrance to the tunnel, at Inchicore.

In late 2017, developers expressed concern that planned developments near Pearse Station were declined permission on the basis of their potential impact on the proposed DART Underground project.

== Possible routes and stations ==
If routed as originally proposed, the existing (single) DART line would be replaced by two DART lines forming a rough "X" shape - with an intersection at Pearse Station.

The first of these lines would begin to the north-east of the city in Howth/Malahide, follow the existing DART line to Clontarf Road station, before diverging into a tunnel which would ultimately emerge close to the Inchicore railway works grounds. A second line would follow the existing southern DART line from Bray/Greystones to Connolly Station, from which it would diverge on a line to Maynooth station in Kildare.

If following this plan, underground platforms would be added to the existing over-ground platforms at Spencer Dock station, Pearse station, and Stephen's Green station. New stations would also be built close to Christ Church (underground) and Inchicore (overground).

As of 2018, no route was confirmed and no station developments were planned or funded. Additional assessment (of both routes and stations) was proposed to be undertaken between 2018 and 2027.

As of 2021, Jacobs Engineering were reportedly charged with devising route options for the line, with no direction to "adhere to the previously alignment" or "location of new stations required [if any]".

== See also ==
- Rail transport in Ireland
