= Dublin Pearse railway station =

Railway station in Dublin, Ireland

Dublin Pearse Stáisiún na bPiarsach
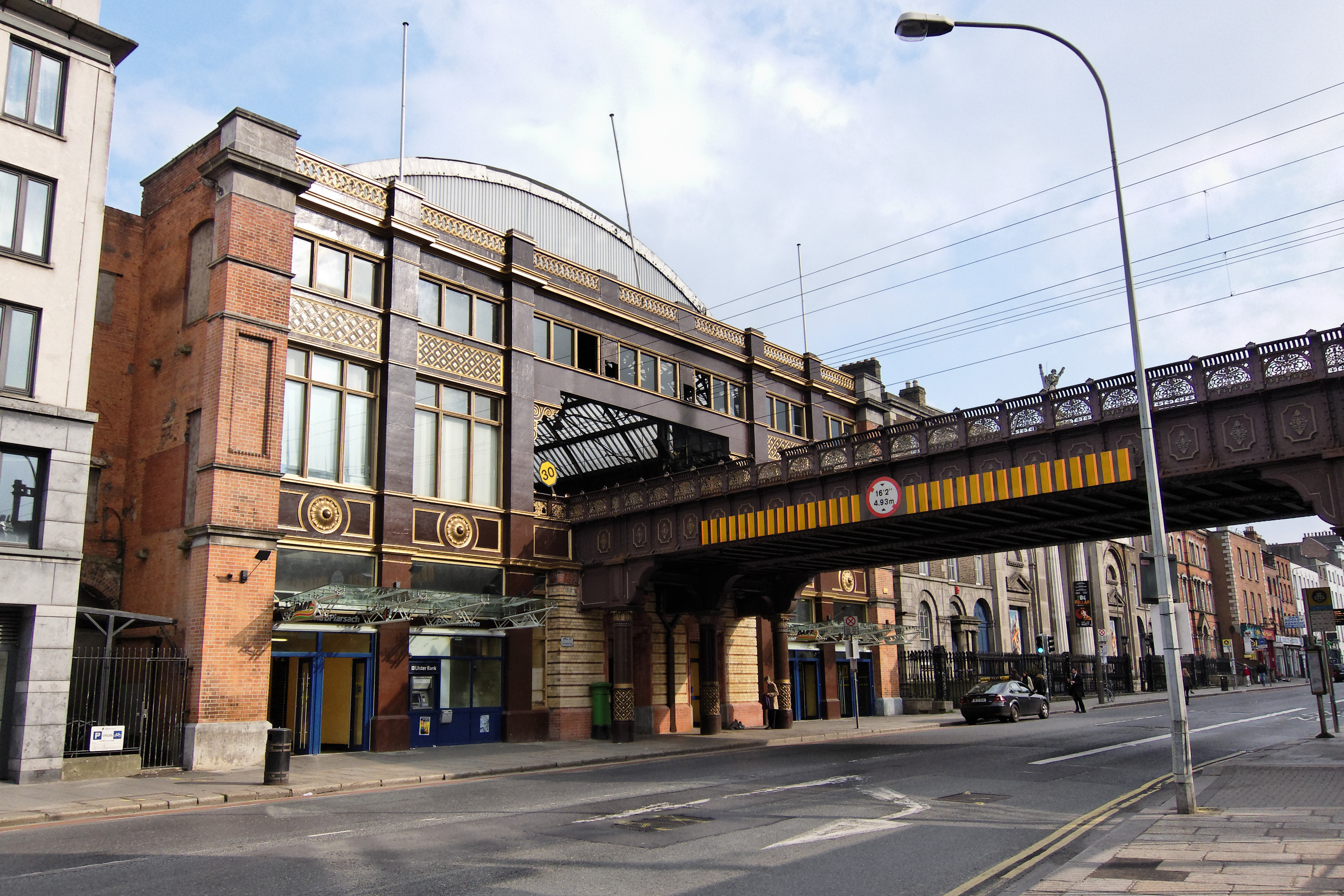

General information
- Location: Westland Row, Dublin, D02 RV00, Ireland
- Coordinates: 53.3433°N 6.2483°W
- Owner: Iarnród Éireann
- Operator: Iarnród Éireann
- Platforms: 2
- Tracks: 3
- Bus routes: 32
- Bus operators: Bus Eireann; Dublin Bus; Matthews
- Connections: 4; 7; 7A; 7E; 15A; 15B; 15D; 23; 24; 27; 27X; 44; 44D; 47; 52; 60; 56A; 77A; 82; 100X; 101X; 111X; 120; 133; 904; 910; C1; C2; C3; C4; C5; C6; NX; P29

Construction
- Structure type: Elevated
- Platform levels: 1
- Parking: No
- Cycle facilities: Yes

Other information
- Station code: PERSE
- Fare zone: Suburban 1

History
- Original company: Dublin and Kingstown Railway
- Pre-grouping: Dublin and South Eastern Railway
- Post-grouping: Great Southern Railways

Key dates
- 17 December 1834: Opened, as Westland Row
- 1857: Regauged to 5 ft 3 in
- 1880s: New roof and enlargement
- 1891: Dublin loop line opened
- 1937: Services to the west of Ireland commence
- 1966: Renamed Pearse
- 1983: Upgraded
- 2007: Renovation commences
- 2013: Renovation completed
- 2019: New roof built
Location

Pearse railway station (Irish: Stáisiún na bPiarsach) or Dublin Pearse serves the Southside of Dublin, Ireland. It is the country's busiest commuter station and second busiest overall behind Dublin Connolly, with nine million passenger journeys through the station in 2016.

== History ==
=== Origins ===
The station building originated from a design by Charles Blacker Vignoles. As the lines from the south were elevated above street level, tracks were laid on the first floor of the building. The initial covering chosen for the passenger station was a two-span structure covering the platforms as far as Cumberland Street. It was designed to facilitate the arrival and departure of trains every 15 minutes.

The station opened for service traffic on 17 December 1834 as Westland Row Station, the city terminus of the Dublin & Kingstown Railway (D&KR), serving Blackrock and the West Pier Kingstown Harbour. (Note: In 1837, the original terminus station was abandoned and the line extended to the current Dún Laoghaire station.)

The precise details of the original 1834 trackwork may be uncertain, but a diagram from 1835 shows three platformed tracks each terminating in linked 10 feet (3.0 m) connecting turntables and a non-platformed carriage siding, all set well back from Westland Row entrance. The arrivals road and platform were nearest to Merrion Square. This was in common with most platforms until the 1870s of the low-level continental style. On the other side of the arrivals track was an island platform which was the only means of access to a train on the next track. The island platform was of a raised height design and was accessed by a lower-able drawbridge ramp from the arrivals platform. The departure track was on the side of the middle line of pillars supporting the two-span roof that extended as far as Cumberland Street. The track was serviced by a departure platform that allowed separate access for first-class passengers at the southern end of the train. The final track was a siding on the Pearse Street side of the station. The station entrance from Westland Row contained two sets of stairs to the upper platform level. There was also a (horse-drawn) cab entrance and ramp to the far end of the arrival platform which would have been convenient for first-class passengers.

In 1857, the gauge was changed from 1,435 mm (4 ft 8 1/2 in) to 5 ft 3 in (1,600 mm) to match the Irish standard. By then, Dublin and Wicklow Railway (D&WR) had taken over operations from the D&KR and trains were able to run over the course of the old Dalkey Atmospheric Railway through to connecting at Shanganagh junction with the line from Harcourt Street to Bray.

Patronage grew to 4.5 million passengers per annum in the late 1870s with powers and land obtained for the enlargement of the station. A map of the station in 1878 shows a "departure local & arrival mail" platform of not more than 400 feet (120 m) on the Great Brunswick Street (Pearse Street) side where platform 2 is now, and a similar platform opposite for "departure mail & arrival local" purposes. A turntable existed at the end of the line which could enable an engine to draw away from its train, turn and proceed up the other line if the station was empty.

There ensured various alterations in the 1880s including the replacement of the roof and thereafter had four platforms and five tracks, later becoming five platforms. The main span covered the two long platforms where the tracks were later to be extended northbound and two southbound bay platforms one to each side of them. There was also a roof span to the south-west, which covers a smaller southbound bay platform.

The ownership of the station remained with the D&KR until the amalgamation to Great Southern Railways in 1925. During the interim period, the main operating company the D&WR changed its name to Dublin, Wicklow and Wexford Railway (DW&WR) in 1860 and Dublin and South Eastern Railway (DSER) in 1907.

=== 1891 rebuild as a through station ===
The station was extensively rebuilt for the opening of the City of Dublin Junction Railway in 1891. During this process, the station was converted into a layout through the station with three terminus platforms that were to remain unchanged until the early 2000s. The north-east bay was filled in towards the end of that period. The existing tracks at the Northern end of the station had to be raised by 18 inches (460 mm) to give the required clearance over Westland Row and the platforms had to be sloped upwards towards the platform exit to compensate. Some DW&WR suburban trains started working through to Amiens Street and boat trains and mail could subsequently be worked round to Broadstone and Kingsbridge.

An 1893 and 1924 diagram show the platforms numbered as follows: (Note: The platform numbering here is evidenced by a diagram dated 1924 in W. Ernest Shepherd's book The Dublin & South Eastern Railway, by photographs taken in the early 1960s by James O'Dea (and collected by the National Library of Ireland), and by other photographs taken in 1993. In his book Irish Steam, in a passage referring to 1937, O.S. Nock labels the platforms 1 to 5 in the opposite direction and with the small bay as 5. It is possible that the bay platforms may have been renumbered when the through platforms were renumbered 1 and 2)

1. A bay southbound platform in the smaller canopy on the Merrion Square side. The 1893 diagram shows the platform as the same size as platform 2; the 1924 diagram shows it as shorter
2. A bay southbound platform in under the main canopy
3. The 'down' through platform which is now platform 1 generally used for southbound trains
4. The 'up' though platform which is now platform 2 generally used for northbound trains. The 1893 diagram shows this shorter than platform 3
5. A bay southbound platform under the main canopy. The 1893 diagram shows this bay of a long length, in the 1924 diagram it is shown as the same length as platform 2.

=== Former services ===
Prior to 1936, the station handled commuter services and boat trains. In January 1937, the station took over services to Sligo, Westport and Galway over the Midland and Great Western Route via Mullingar, which were transferred to Pearse (then Westland Row) in 1934 with the closure of Broadstone on the north side of the Liffey. Great Southern Railways (GSR) facilitated this by installing colour light signalling in 1937 allowing reversible working for the main platforms. These express trains used platform 4 as the departure and arrivals platform which was convenient for the boat trains which generally ran into platform 5. On occasion, the train for Galway train would be driven engine-first into platform 5 and the passengers loaded; it would then reverse out and pass through the station on platform 3. Services running south of Bray on the ex-DSER route to Wicklow, Arklow, Wexford and Rosslare also operated out of Westland Row; however, the principal terminus for that route was Harcourt Street until 1959.

The upgrading of the Portarlington to Athlone branch in the mid-1970s saw Westport and Galway trains transferred to Heuston, whilst Sligo and Rosslare Europort trains were retimed to originate and terminate at Connolly station. A very small number of passenger services to Heuston or its main line continued to pass through Pearse station until the about the time of the closure of the Dún Laoghaire pier branch around 1989.

=== Station renaming ===
Several Irish railway stations were renamed in 1966, as part of the Easter Rising 50th anniversary celebrations; the station was named after the Pearse brothers, Patrick and Willie. Probably due to confusion with the nearby Pearse Street, Dubliners often refer to it as "Pearse Street station". (Note: The name Pearse Street Station is also used to refer to a nearby 1915 Garda Síochána (police) barracks formerly known as College Station which was also renamed in 1966 to commemorate the 50th Anniversary of the 1916 rising.)

=== Bay platform removal ===
The bay platforms have been used as a set for movies including Johnny Nobody, Michael Collins, Angela's Ashes, Nora and the 2005 remake of Lassie. Until 2007, the former platform 2 was occasionally used for special services. The former platform 1 continued to exist, but was unsuitable for modern passenger trains and was used as a siding before conversion to a car park. Platform 5 had also been unused for some time. By 2008, all of the bay platforms had been removed or filled in.

=== Station renovation ===
Major renovation commenced in 2007, with publicity erected in the station for this in March 2008. As part of phase 1, automatic ticket validation machines were installed on platforms 1 and 2. The front entrance of the station was changed. The former Spar shop was completely taken out of the station and the old ticket barriers were removed; platforms 3, 4 and 5 were removed. New signage and CCTV cameras were added on both active platforms and a larger waiting area for passengers was provided on platform 2.

An additional southbound entrance (Pearse Street and Trinity Bio Science) was opened on 9 April 2013.

=== Signalling improvements ===
The completion of the Irish Rail City Centre Resignalling Project has seen an increase in the number of Northern and Maynooth line suburban trains stopping. Trains from Newbridge now also serve Pearse station. This was made possible by increasing the ability of the signalling system in the city centre to operate 20 trains per hour in both directions instead of the previous 8. The project began in March 2015 and was commissioned on 17 July 2016.

=== Roof renovations ===
The roof structure comprises two main sections - the main station area roof has 40 barrelled roof trusses, each spanning 28 metres, over 38 bays, with additional gable end structures at both ends. Adjacent to the main station roof there is a second similar roof, which covers a car park and station infrastructure area. This is smaller and comprises 19 trusses over 18 bays.

A €10m roof replacement project started in August 2018 and was completed in June 2020.

Pearse Station was closed for 13 weekends over the two years to facilitate the replacement project. During these weekends, northside Dublin Area Rapid Transit (DART), Maynooth and Drogheda services operated to and from Connolly station, with southside DART and Rosslare services operating from Grand Canal Dock.

== Facilities ==
Pearse Station sign - (Irish: Stáisiún na bPiarsach)

The station has two through platforms, 1 and 2, the former on the Boyne Street side for northbound up services towards Connolly station, the other on the Pearse Street side for southbound down services towards Bray and Wexford. It also has a café, shop and public toilets.

The southbound entrance (Pearse Street and Trinity BioScience) is open from 7:00am to 7:30pm daily from Monday to Friday excluding Bank Holidays, and on Saturdays from 9:00am to 6:00pm, in addition to the main entrance on Westland Row, which is open all during station opening hours. The ticket office is open from 7:30am to 9:50pm, Monday to Sunday.

== Services ==
=== Railway ===
The station is served by the following routes:

- InterCity: between Dublin Connolly and Rosslare Europort
- Dublin Area Rapid Transit: between Drogheda and Greystones
- Northern Commuter: to Balbriggan and Dundalk
- South Eastern Commuter: between Dublin Connolly, Bray, Wicklow and Gorey
- South Western Commuter: between Grand Canal Dock, Newbridge, Kildare and Portlaoise
- Western Commuter: to Maynooth and Longford.

Preceding station	Iarnród Éireann	Following station
Tara Street	InterCity; Dublin-Rosslare	Dún Laoghaire Mallin
Tara Street	Commuter; South Eastern Commuter	Lansdowne Road
Tara Street	DART; Dublin Area Rapid Transit	Grand Canal Dock
	Disused railways	
Terminus	Dublin and Kingstown Railway	Sandymount
Tara Street	City of Dublin Junction Railway	Terminus

=== Buses ===
The station is served by several bus routes, which are operated predominately by Bus Eireann and Dublin Bus. Bus stops are located just outside of the station on Westland Row and around the corner on Pearse Street.

== Proposed underground station ==
The National Transport Authority proposed a DART Underground connecting Heuston Station to the northern DART network, via Docklands. As part of this project, an underground station would have been constructed beneath Pearse station. The proposed project was shelved in 2011 and, as of 2024, is not scheduled for any development or funding until "after 2042".

== Gallery ==
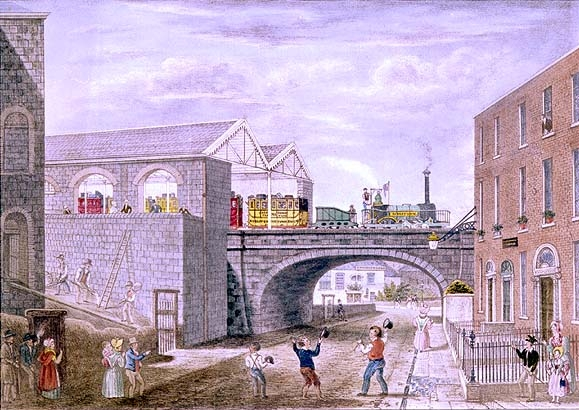
First service departs over Cumberland Street for Kingstown in December 1834

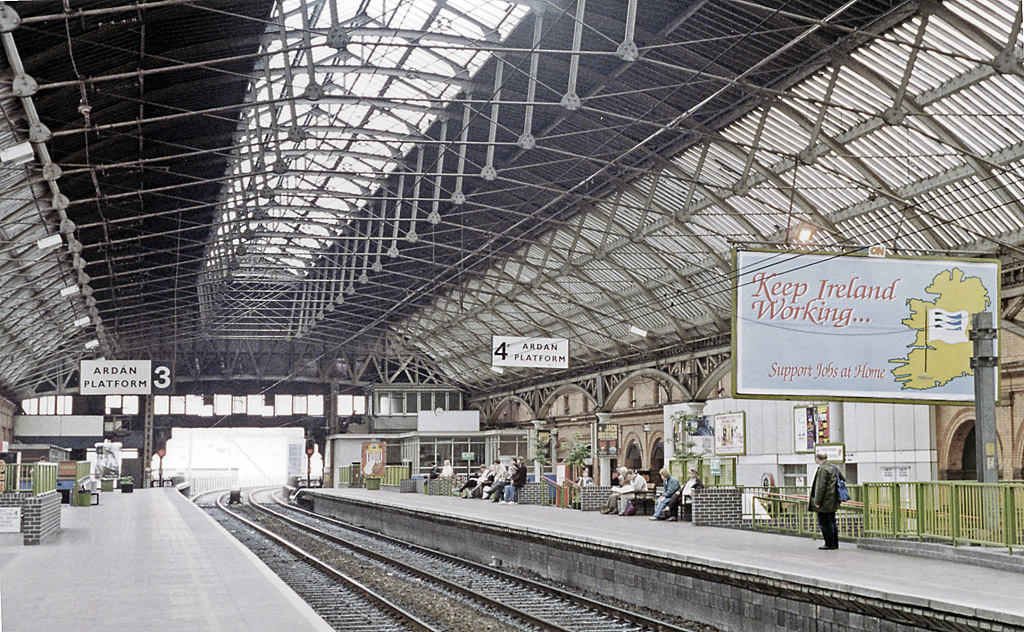
Pearse Station in 1993 looking north. The through platforms are numbered 3 and 4

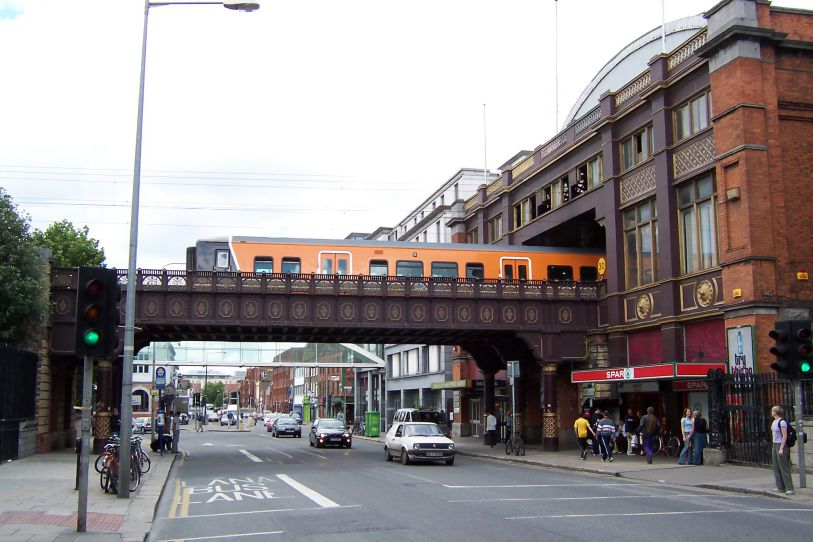
Train crossing Westland Row and entering the station building in 2003

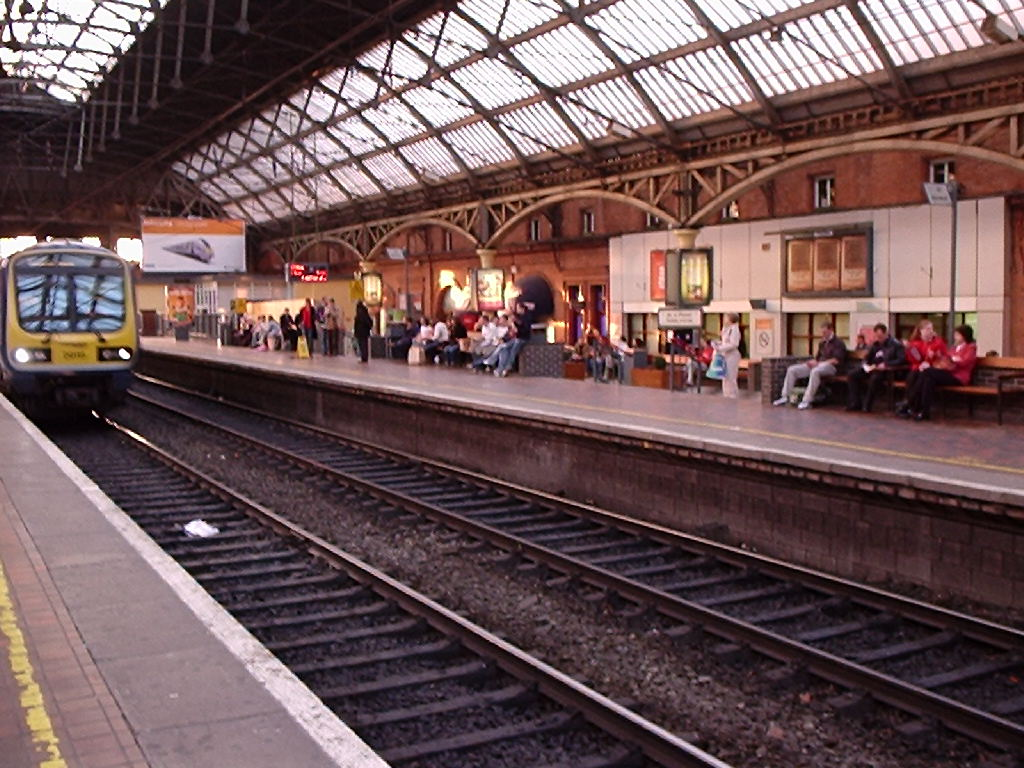
The interior of Pearse Station in 2006

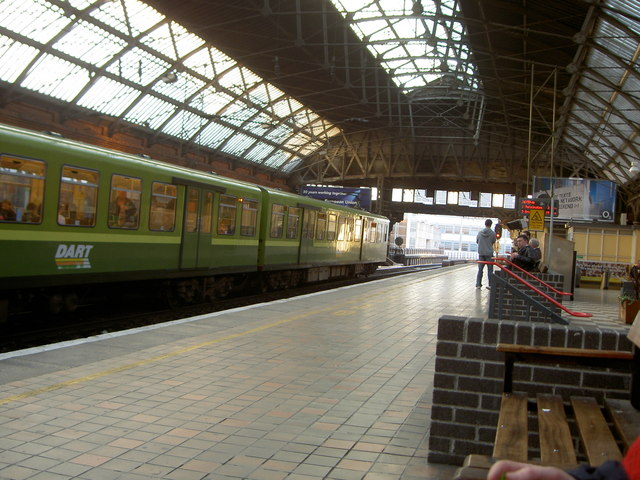
DART electric train on platform 1 in 2007

== See also ==
- List of railway stations in Ireland
- Rail transport in Ireland
- History of rail transport in Ireland
