= High-quality dual carriageway =

Road category in Ireland

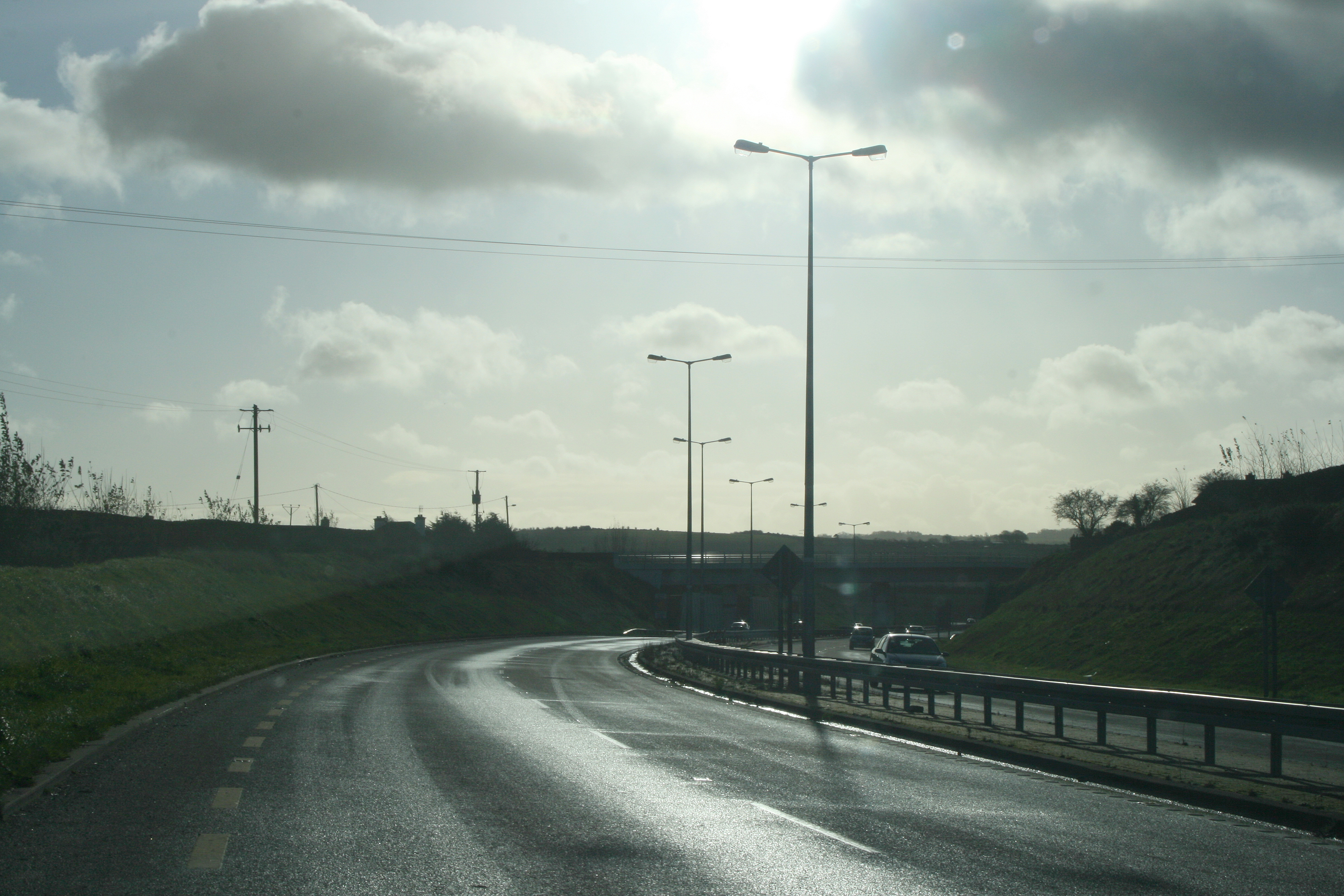
HQDC section of the N22 approaching Cork South Ring (N40) from the north

A high-quality dual carriageway (HQDC) is a road category in Ireland. It is defined as an all-purpose dual carriageway road type built to near motorway standards, but without motorway classification or motorway restrictions. High-quality dual carriageways have full grade-separated access and do not have junctions with minor roads. Such roads in the Republic of Ireland have been built as part of the 2000–2006 and 2007–2013 National Development Plans, including interurban routes from Dublin to other cities.

While HQDCs or roads of similar type exist in a number of countries this article concentrates mainly on such roads in Ireland.

== Specifications ==
Standard motorways: 52,000 vehicles AADT – annual average daily traffic. The road type is all-purpose dual carriageway (D2AP), but with the same specifications as motorway: a carriageway width of 7 metres (23 ft) and a hard shoulder of 2.5 metres (8 ft 2 in) width. HQDCs are limited access (grade-separated junctions only) and not intended to have junctions with minor roads. Junctions with major roads are grade-separated and to motorway standards.

All HQDCs in Ireland currently form part of national primary roads, and therefore use the national road speed limit of 100 km/h (62 mph). There are exceptions however, as special speed limits may now be specified for sections of road if the local authority passes a by-law. For example, a section of the N1 from the northern end of the M1 motorway (north of Dundalk to the border with Northern Ireland) has a 120 km/h (75 mph) speed limit.

Signage on Irish HQDCs is similar to signage used on Irish motorways, and junction numbers may be present (as on motorways, indicated by a white number on a black panel in the corner of signs). However signage on HQDCs uses a green background instead of the blue background used on Irish motorway signage. In the event of an HQDC being a regional road, black text on a white background would be used instead. Also, as on other all-purpose roads, signs should include patches for roads of other classifications (on motorways, all information signage should have a blue background).

As high-quality dual carriageways are not motorways, they do not need to conform to motorway regulations, therefore slow-moving vehicles (e.g. tractors, farm vehicles etc.) as well as cyclists are permitted to use these roads. HQDCs have a hard shoulder marked with a broken yellow line (as is standard on Irish roads), rather than the solid yellow line used to mark the hard shoulder of an Irish motorway. Also, L-Drivers (Learner Drivers), who are not permitted to drive on motorways can do so on high-quality dual carriageways, as on the rest of the national road network. HQDCs are a road type, not a classification, and the normal rules and regulations applying to all-purpose roads apply on HQDCs.

Lay-bys (rest stops) are permitted on HQDCs and the N6/M6 Kinnegad – Kilbeggan scheme originally featured lay-bys, which would not be legal at present on roads with full motorway status, prior to its redesignation as a motorway. The M9 Carlow bypass was built with lay-bys as it was originally to be built as an HQDC section of the N9 route. The lay-bys were removed after the road was reclassified as a motorway. Lay-bys on other HQDCs which were reclassified as motorways were restricted to authorised vehicles only and are likely to be used mainly by Garda Síochána (police) patrol vehicles.

=== High Quality Dual Carriageways with Motorway Speed Limits in Ireland ===
The standard speed limit for cars on Irish motorways is 120 km/h (75 mph) (the minimum speed limit for any type of vehicle is 50 km/h (31 mph)). The standard speed limit on national roads is 100 km/h (62 mph). A number of local authorities have passed special speed limit by-laws permitting dual carriageways in their administrative area to carry motorway speed limits of 120 km/h (75 mph).

Route	Section	Counties	Destinations	Officially Introduced
N1	North of Dundalk to Northern Ireland border	Louth	(Dublin) – Belfast	15 August 2007
N40 /N22	Bandon Road Roundabout to Ovens	County Cork	Cork – Killarney	
N25	Dunkettle to Carrigtwohill	County Cork	Cork – Waterford	

== HQDCs on Major Inter-Urban Routes ==
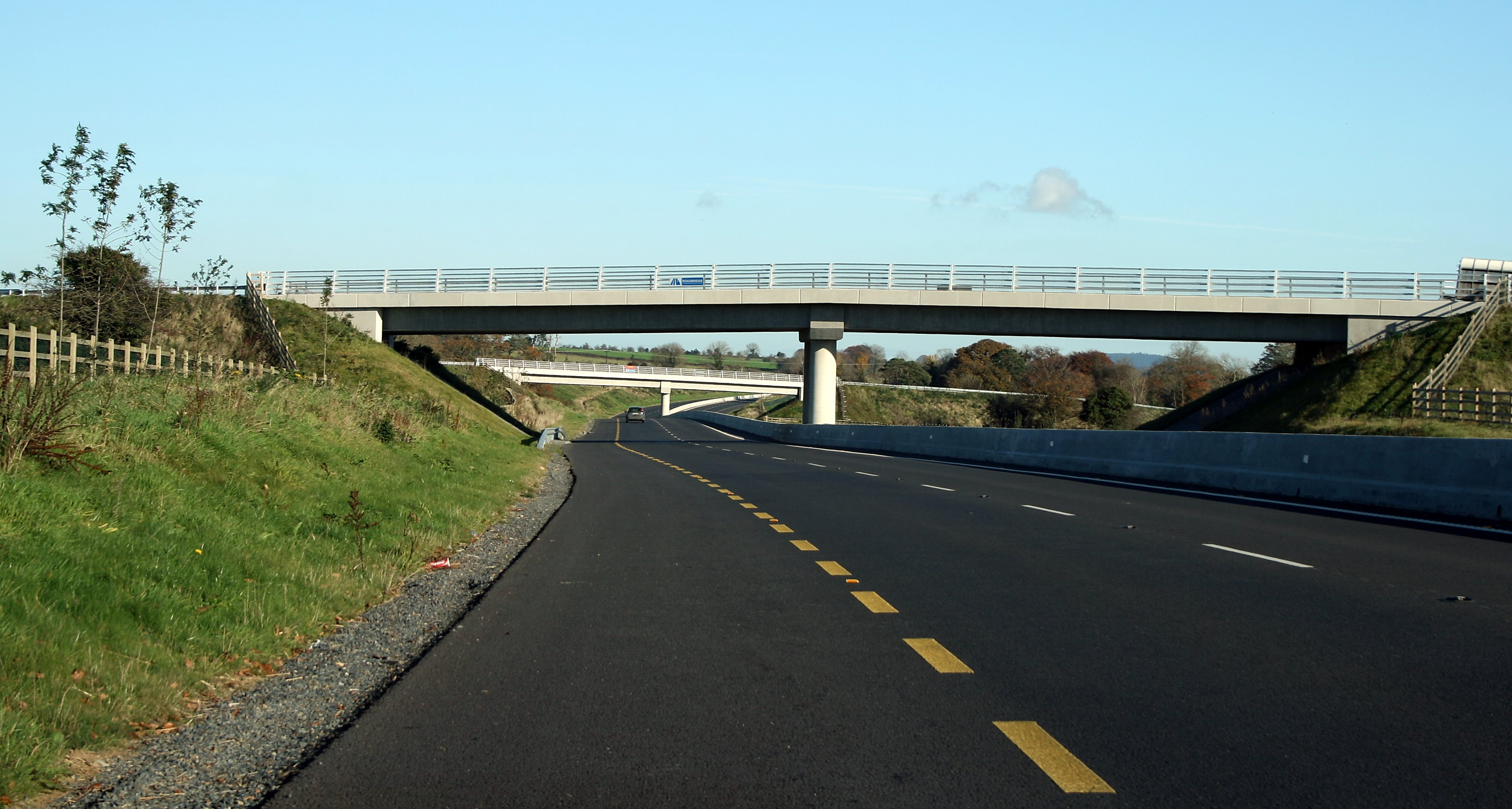
N11 HQDC Gorey Bypass prior to re-designation as M11 motorway.

Many of the Major Inter-Urban Routes between Dublin and other cities in Ireland were originally to be built to motorway standard but without motorway restrictions, and were to be designated as HQDCs. Roads that were to be built as HQDC include the N6/M6 Kinnegad – Athlone scheme (completed in July 2008), the M8 Mitchelstown – Cashel scheme (completed in October 2008) and the M9 Carlow bypass scheme (completed in June 2008). These roads will form part of the major inter-urban routes network. The advantage of an HQDC over a motorway in this regard is that a simpler planning permission process is used, rather than the more complex Motorway Scheme process used to create a motorway. However the problem of using the normal planning process is that in theory planning permission could be granted for a direct access for a home or business onto the HQDC; although such direct accesses are now discouraged under public policy there is no legal impediment. Motorways, by contrast, may only have accesses at junctions and service areas. HQDCs which form part of national road routes use the N (national road) prefix on signage as opposed to the M prefix used where the route or a section of it is motorway.

Most of the HQDC sections on the major inter-urban network of roads in Ireland have been redesignated as motorways or have been proposed for redesignation.

== Redesignation as motorway ==
In 2007 new legislation was introduced to allow the Government to designate HQDCs as motorways and thus avoid the risk of permission for direct access being granted by local planning authorities. The Roads Act 2007 was passed by the Oireachtas in early 2007 and signed into law to by the President of Ireland on 11 July 2007. The Act introduced powers for the Minister for Transport (on the recommendation of Transport Infrastructure Ireland) to re-designate high quality dual carriageways as motorways, following a public consultation process. It is possible that in the future a majority of HQDCs will be reclassified as motorways.

A number of the former high-quality dual carriageway schemes proceeded as tolled motorway PPPs (Public Private Partnerships) despite not being originally planned as motorway schemes. Such roads include the M6 Galway – Ballinasloe project. The N25 Waterford City bypass is the only HQDC planned at present to be tolled. Almost all other Irish toll roads are motorways, although the East-Link toll bridge which is a regional road is also tolled.

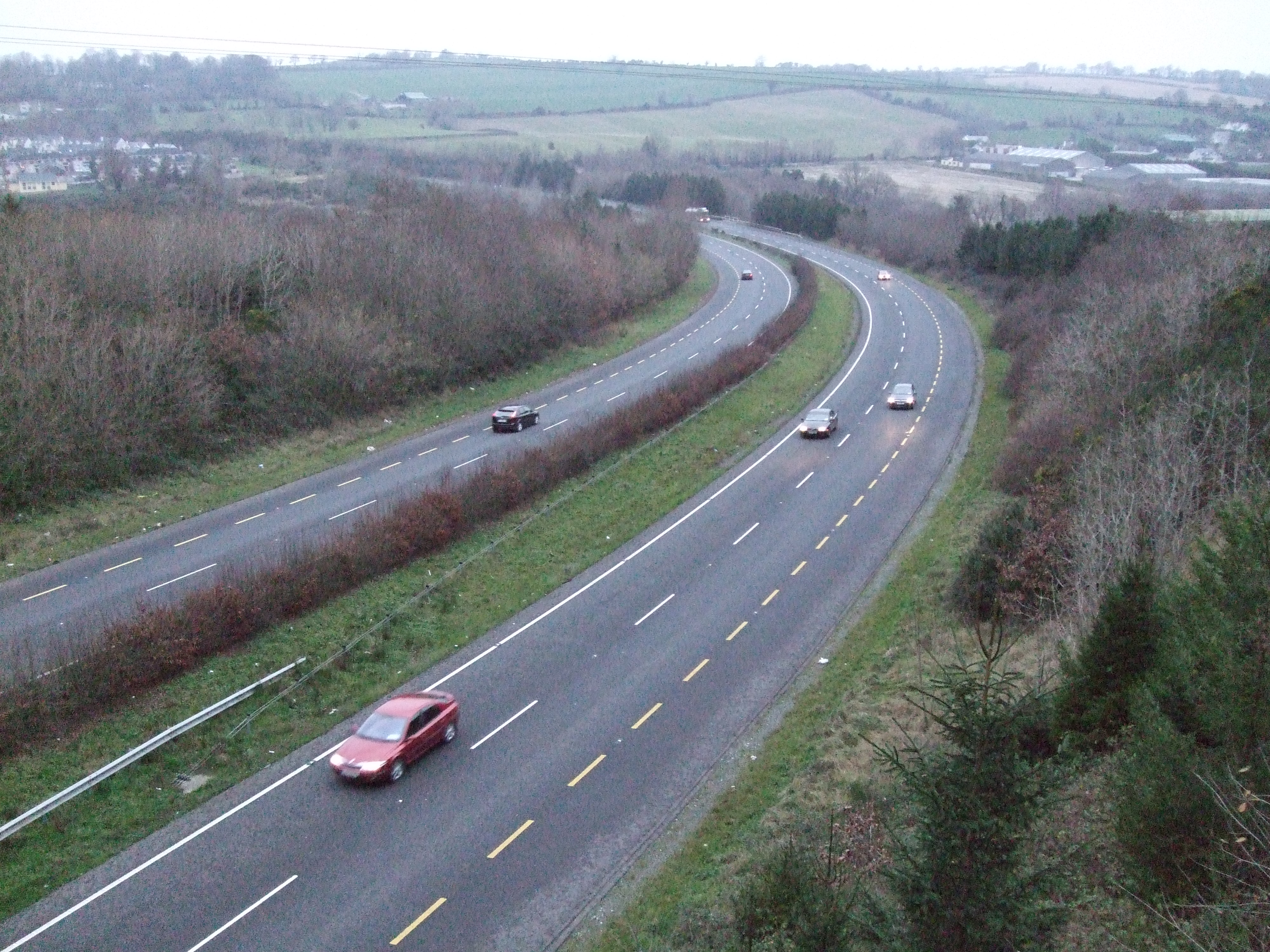
This section of the N8 5 km north of Cork was redesignated as motorway.

The Roads Act 2007 was passed into law in mid-2007. This Act made provision for the redesignation of suitable dual carriageways to motorway status. The National Roads Authority made formal applications under Section 8 of the Act to the Minister for Transport on 16 October 2007 regarding dual carriageways which the authority believed to be suitable for redesignation as motorways. On 29 January 2008, the Department of Transport published notice of the Minister's intention to make the orders being sought and invited submissions or observations to be made to the Minister regarding the NRA's applications. The initial applications proposed the following roads be redesignated as motorways:

Route	Proposed motorway section	Destinations
N6 road	Kinnegad (M6 J2) – Athlone	(Dublin) – Galway
N7 road	South of Borris-in-Ossory to Annacotty	Dublin – Limerick
N8 road	Urlingford – Fermoy	(Dublin) – Cork
N9 road	Kilcullen – Waterford (junction with proposed N25 road)	(Dublin) – Waterford

The consultation procession lasted until 28 March 2008. On 17 July 2008 the Minister signed a statutory instrument reclassifying all the HQDCs then either under construction or recently completed on the N7/M7, and N8/M8 as well as parts of the N6/M6 and N9/M9 as motorway. The redesignations came into effect on 24 September 2008. The Carlow bypass and Kilbeggan-Athlone roads opened with motorway signage but with temporary 100 km/h (62 mph) general speed limits between their opening and their official re-designation as motorways. These roads now operate under motorway restrictions with motorway signage and use the M prefix. The standard speed limit on these roads is now 120 km/h (75 mph).

On 30 September 2008, the NRA proposed that the following dual-carriageways be re-designated as motorways:

Route	Proposed motorway section	Destinations
N2 road	Junction 2 – north of Ashbourne	Dublin – Derry
N3 road	Mulhuddart – Dunboyne	Dublin – Ballyshannon
N4 road	Kinnegad – McNead's Bridge	Dublin – Sligo
N6 road	Athlone – Galway	(Dublin) – Galway
N7 road	Annacotty – Limerick	Dublin – Limerick
N8 road	Watergrasshill – Cork	(Dublin) – Cork
N11 road	Ashford – Rathnew and Arklow – Gorey	(Dublin) – Wexford
N18 road	Ennis – Galway	Limerick – Galway
N20 road	Limerick – Patrickswell	Limerick – Cork

The closing date for submissions was 14 November 2008. The statutory instrument passed in early 2009 and came into effect in mid-2009, with the exception of the N6 Athlone Bypass (remains dual-carriageway/HQDC).

Upgrading to motorway status meant the hard shoulder of the high quality dual carriageways chosen to be redesignated had to be changed from a broken yellow line to a continuous yellow line. Green signage also had to be changed to blue. In some instances the cost of this retrofit ran to millions of euro as it involved the replacement of existing gantry and large panel signage as well as the application of hundreds of kilometres of thermoplastic road paint. In September 2008, the Cahir to Cashel stretch of the M8 had its gantry signage changed and hard shoulder re-painted. Parts of the M6 also underwent the same process.

== See also ==
- Autostrasse
- Roads in Ireland
- National primary road
- National secondary road
- Regional road
- Local roads in Ireland
- Atlantic Corridor
- Dublin Port Tunnel
- Jack Lynch Tunnel
- History of roads in Ireland
- Trunk roads in Ireland
- Transport Infrastructure Ireland
- Road signs in Ireland
- Road speed limits in the Republic of Ireland
- Vehicle registration plates of the Republic of Ireland
- Northern Irish Vehicle Registration Plates
- Transport in Ireland
- National Development Plan
- List of Ireland-related topics
