= Road signs in Ireland =

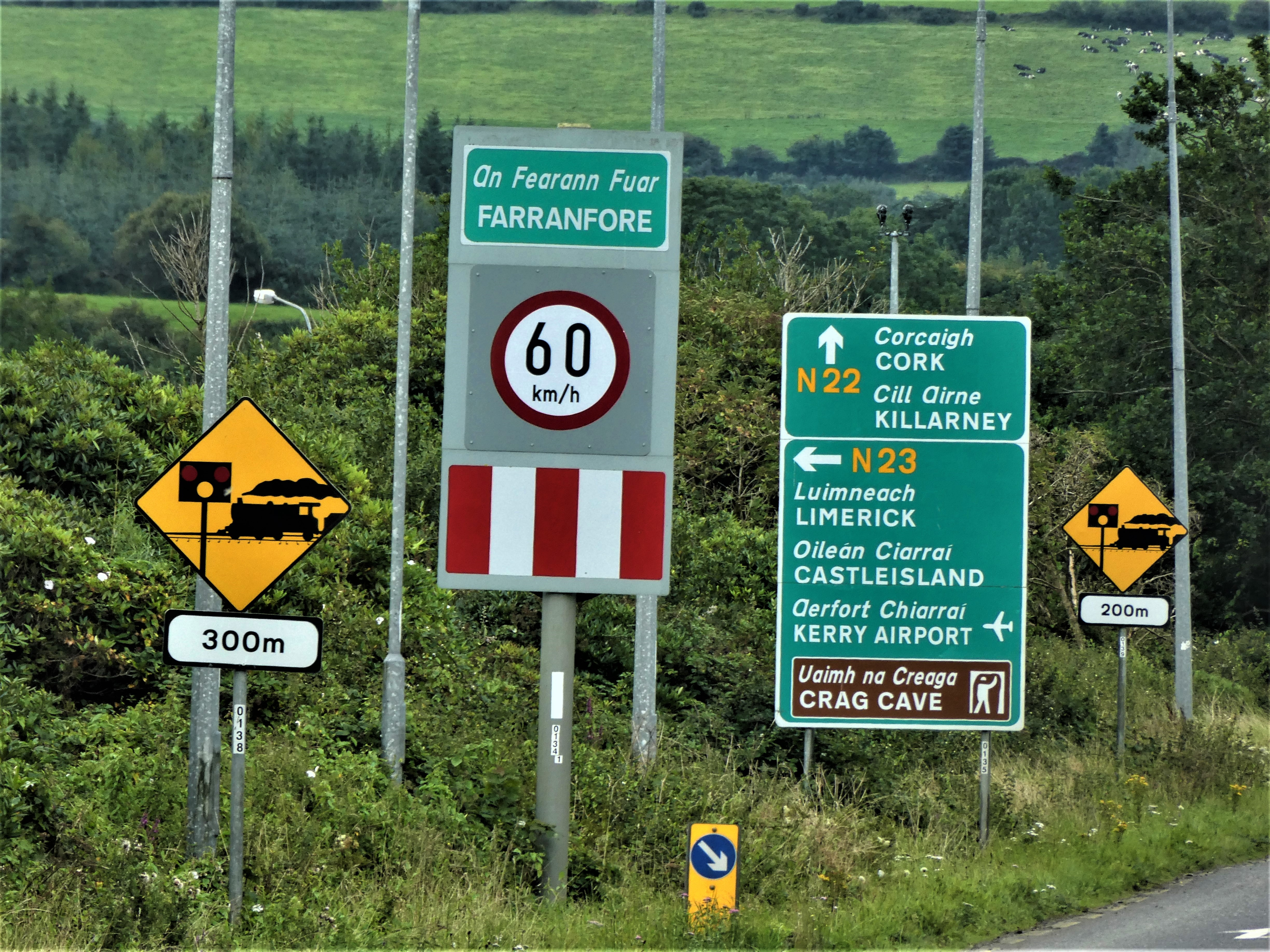
Various road signs outside Farranfore, County Kerry

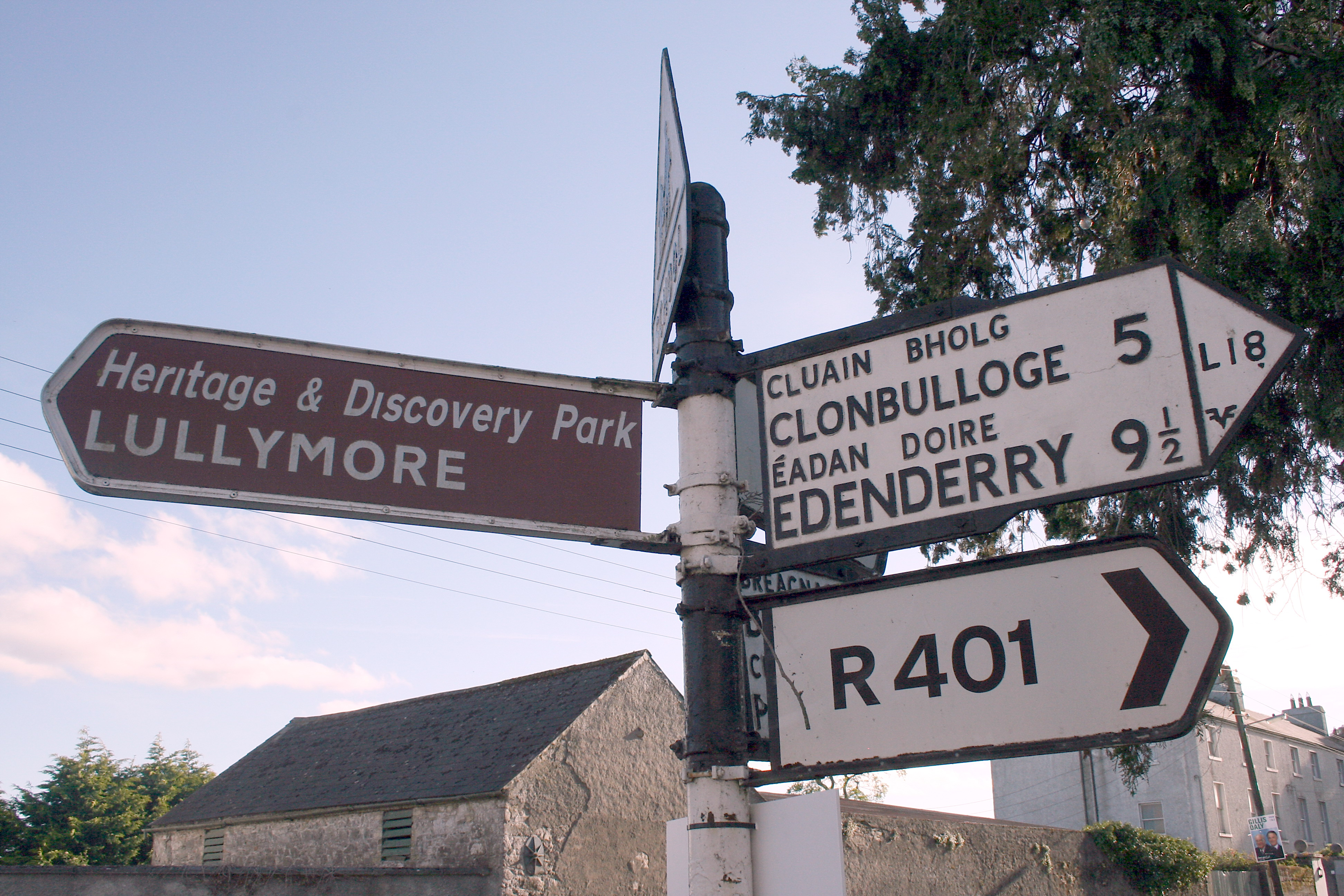
Typical road signs in rural areas of the Republic of Ireland. Here, a fingerpost with old road number and Bord Fáilte logo. Signpost located in Rathangan, County Kildare.

Road signs in Ireland do not differ greatly from those used elsewhere in Europe with the notable exception that hazard or warning signs follow the style of a yellow diamond shape. The symbols used on these warning signs do, nevertheless, resemble much more closely those used (on red-bordered white or yellow triangles) in the rest of Europe than many of those seen in the United States.

Regulatory signs differ very little from those used in the rest of Europe, the main exception being that red-bordered white signs indicate a restriction as opposed to a prohibition, which is instead indicated with an additional red diagonal line across the sign.

The system of directional signs is based upon, and is very similar to, that employed in the United Kingdom, but is bilingual everywhere except in the Gaeltacht, where only the Irish language is used on signs.

== Legal basis ==
Only regulatory signs and certain road markings are prescribed in regulations made by the Minister for Transport, the most recent being the Road Traffic (Traffic Signs) Regulations, 2025. Other traffic signs are provided for in directions issued by the Minister, primarily through the Traffic Signs Manual (TSM) issued by the Department of Transport or, in some cases, by circular letter. Regulatory signs and road markings are also defined in the TSM, but the regulations for them take precedence—the TSM simply provides guidance regarding the design and installation of signs and is not by itself a law.

The most recent edition of the TSM was published in 2019, with some chapters further updated in 2021, 2024 and 2025. This succeeded two earlier editions, published in 1996 and 2010.

== History ==
=== Directional information signs ===
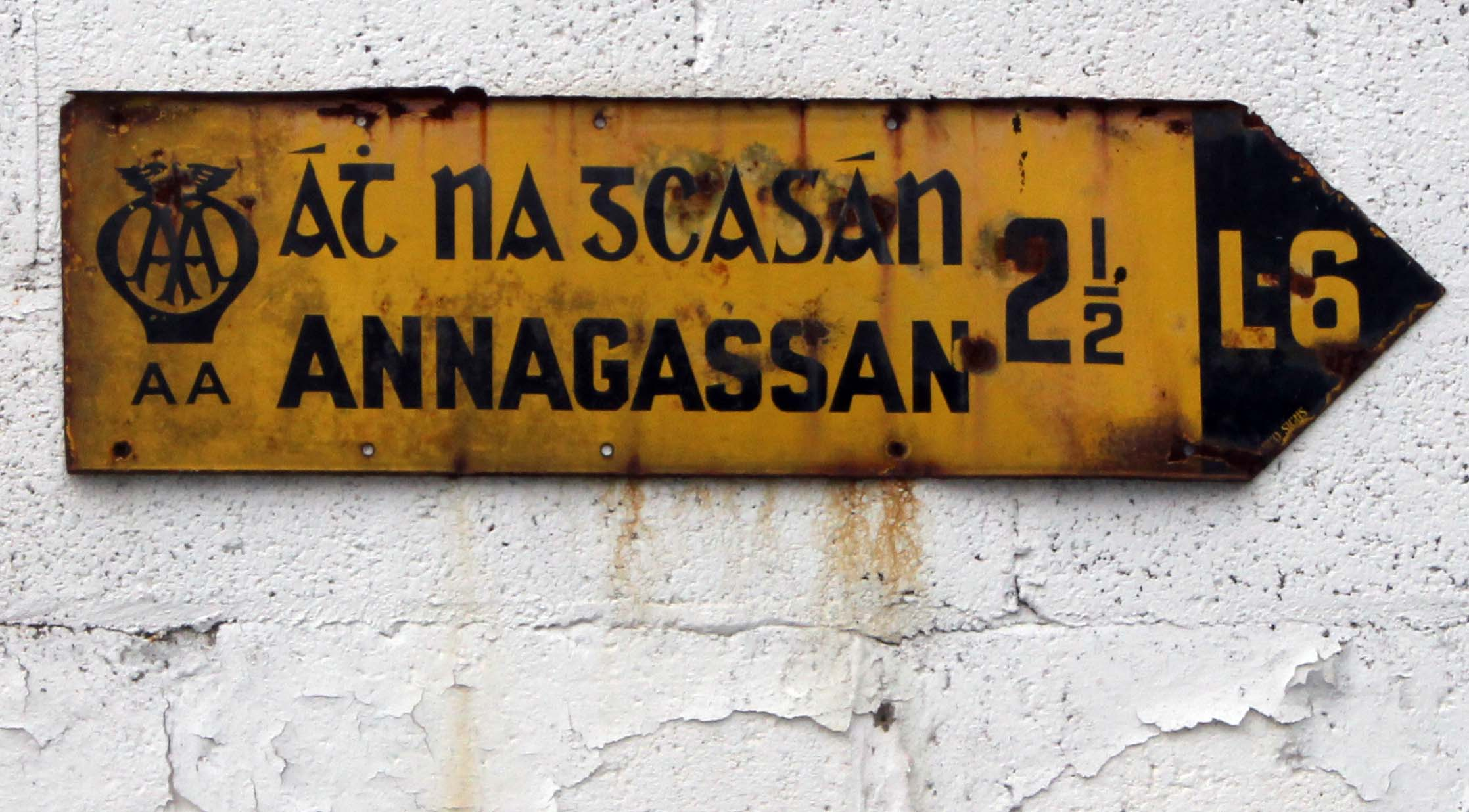
Early bilingual A.A. fingerpost sign

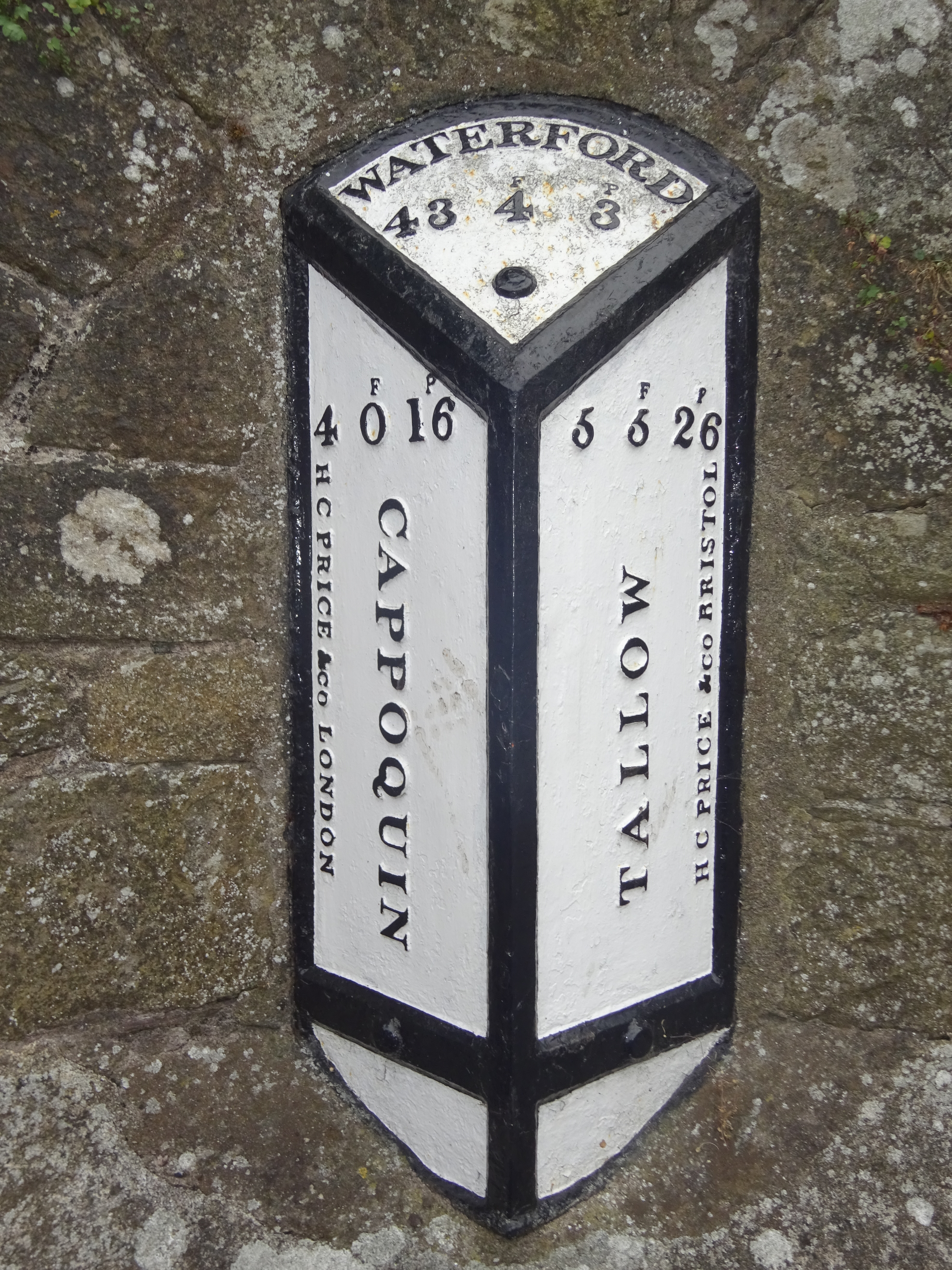
19th-century directional sign in Lismore, County Waterford; it gives distances in miles, furlongs and perches.

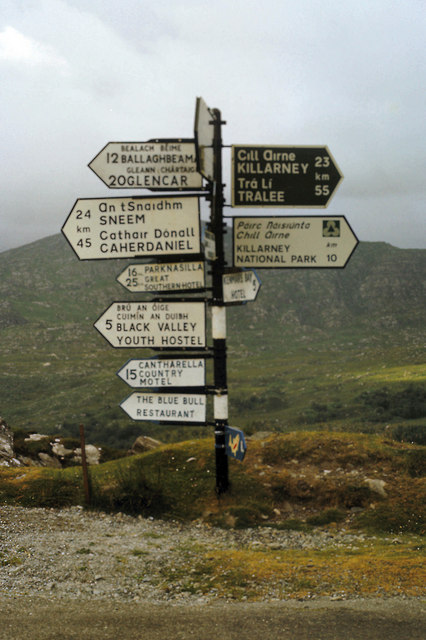
A mixture of pre- and post-1977 fingerpost signs

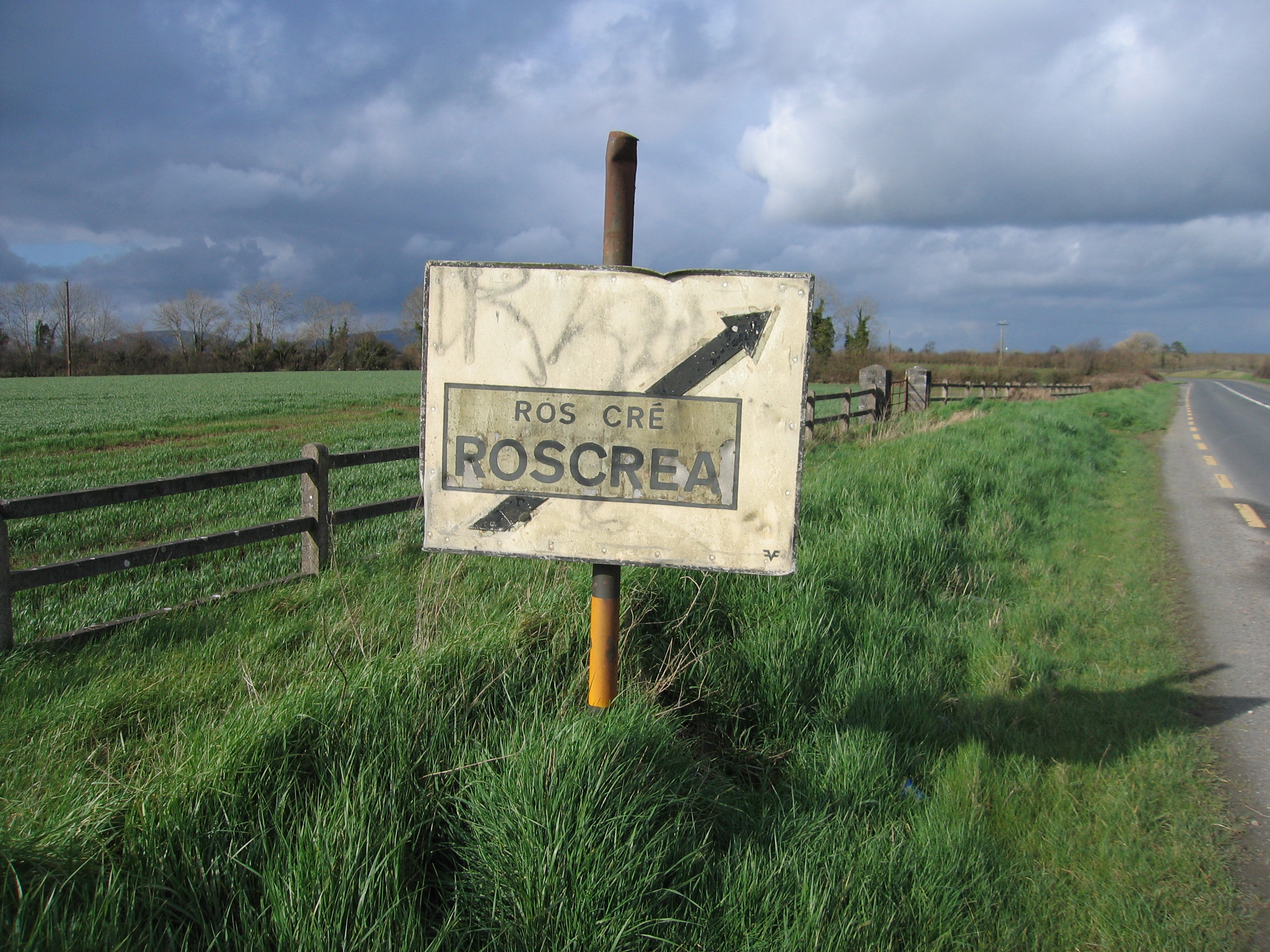
Advance directional sign used pre-1977. This sign has since been removed.

The former 'fingerpost' style of Irish directional signs can still be seen in many rural areas of Ireland. These signs differ from their modern-day equivalent as they have black raised text on a white background. Destinations are in all caps (the placename in Irish was on top and in a smaller font than the one in English). Sometimes, the former route number ("T" for trunk road, "L" for link road) can be seen, and the former Bord Fáilte logo can be seen on some (they had responsibility for signs for a time), as well as occasionally a harp. Distances on these signs are in miles.

This style of sign has become a common feature of many tourist images of Ireland and can be seen in some Irish pubs. However, they can be easily rotated, and have been done so on occasion and therefore are not completely reliable. While most examples of these signs still in situ are rural finger-posts, the advance directional sign of this era can still very occasionally be seen: this has a grey background, with the destinations in outlined, white-background boxes linked together with black lines, and the text is not raised on these, unlike on fingerposts. These signs, rare even when the system was in use, can be seen in some areas of Dún Laoghaire and Drogheda. These signs were prescribed under various regulations, with the final design prescribed under the Road Traffic Signs (Regulations) 1962.

Despite the new sign style being introduced in 1977, the design change was never legislated for (apart from a reference to the change to italics in 1989) and the old designs were repealed only under the 1997 regulations, 20 years later.

The first generation of the current sign system, introduced in 1977, can also be seen in on some national roads (and also on the oldest stretch of the M1). This is similar to the current system, but the signs are simpler, a different shade of green is used, and the Irish place names are not in italics. These signs were directly based on the Worboys Committee designs which had been adopted in the UK in 1965. These signs were replaced by the current system on 1 January 1989. The design of signs has continued to evolve with the introduction of patching under the Guildford Rules in 1994 and the introduction of cantilever directional signs in 2005, as well as the expansion in gantry signs since then.

"Compass-point directions" (such as "The North, "The South" and "The West") were formerly used, particularly in Dublin where the road network intersects. This system, inherited from the UK system, was permitted in the 1996 TSM but subsequently prohibited in the 2010 TSM, which mandated the use of the terminal destination and next primary destination of the route instead.

==== Motorway / high quality dual carriageway signs ====
===== Original design =====
The original design (1983–1989) of Irish motorway signs were a simpler version of the UK design. These signs were only ever in use on the M7 Naas Bypass and M1 Airport Motorway.

From 1989 to 2005, signs on motorways were nearly identical to that on UK motorways, (Note: See pages 10 and 18 of Chapter 3 – Motorway Signs.) although in Ireland, motorway junctions were not always numbered, or the number was not always signposted. The sign at the actual exit, which in the UK shows the road number to be reached, was replaced by a flag sign with the destination instead. On the M50, in the case of junctions with national routes, the initial advance direction sign was replaced with a list of destinations for that national route.

===== 2005-2007 =====
In 2005, upon the opening of the South Eastern Motorway section of the M50, the National Roads Authority erected new style gantry signs. The new signs retained typical colours and fonts but differed from older style of road signs in that they used separate overhead panels for each lane, headed with the route number in each case as well as new half-gantry signs closer to the exit. The new signs were also erected on the N2 Finglas–Ashbourne scheme and N7 Clondalkin–Naas scheme. These were the first roads in Ireland where overhead gantry signs have been used as a matter of course, instead of just very major junctions. Drivers are given clear advanced warning 1 km ahead of an upcoming junction. A half gantry at the junction then directed them to their destination. The new style signs are visually clearer than older type signs with drivers able to read the gantry signs from a distance of approximately 300 m on a straight stretch of road. Despite their significant advantages, the new gantry signs caused confusion because the downward arrows over the left traffic lanes seemed to indicate to drivers that they should pull out into the right lane if they wish to continue on the motorway or dual carriageway, breaking the keep left rule.

===== Current signing policy =====
In July 2007, some of the gantry signs on the M50 between Junctions 13–17 erected in 2005 were replaced with signs in a revised style, reverting to a single panel over the mainline. By March 2008 all the 2005 style gantries had been removed from the M50 (and were later removed from the N2 and N7). The one aspect of the 2005 scheme that was retained is the half-gantry (or cantilever) sign just before the exit, which has now also been extended to other roads. A second change introduced in 2007 is that the flag sign at the gore, which previously listed the primary destinations to be reached, now features the junction number and the word "Exit" instead. This revised scheme has been used on most motorway and high-quality dual carriageway schemes since 2007. The "Next Exit" signs listing destinations, which were originally used only on the M50, are now extended to other motorways.

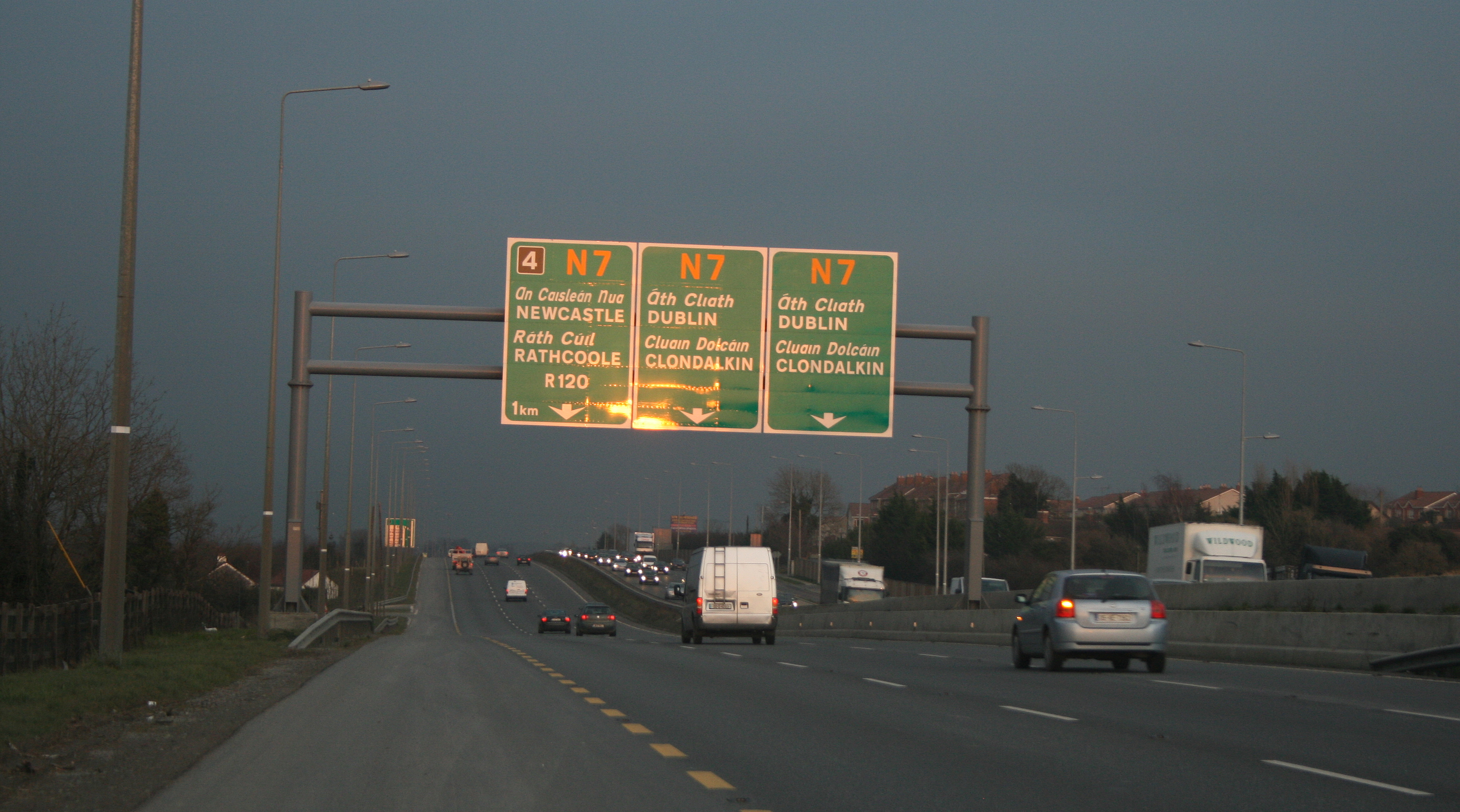
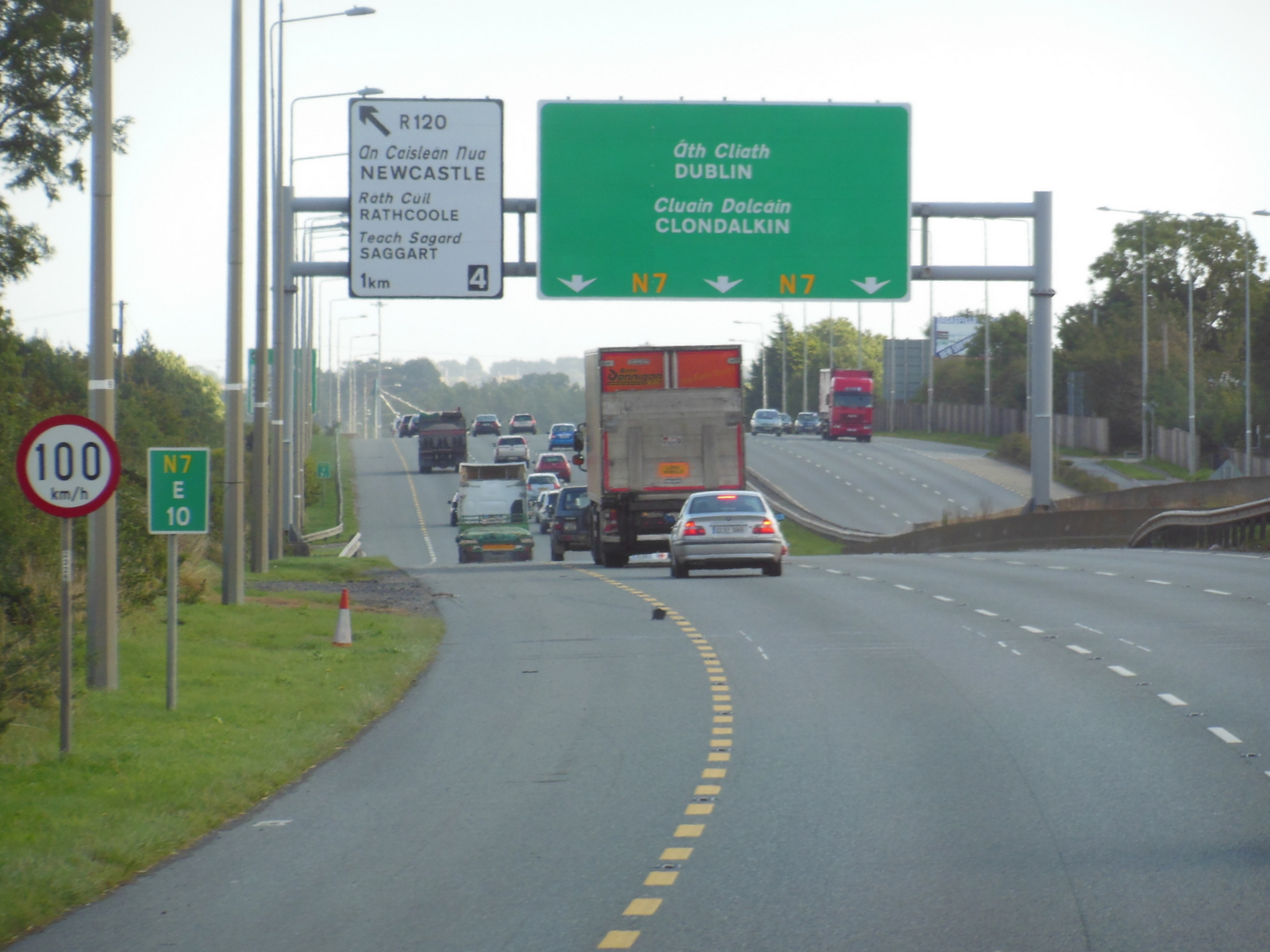
2005-style vs. modern style gantry sign for junction 4 on the N7

=== Regulatory signs ===
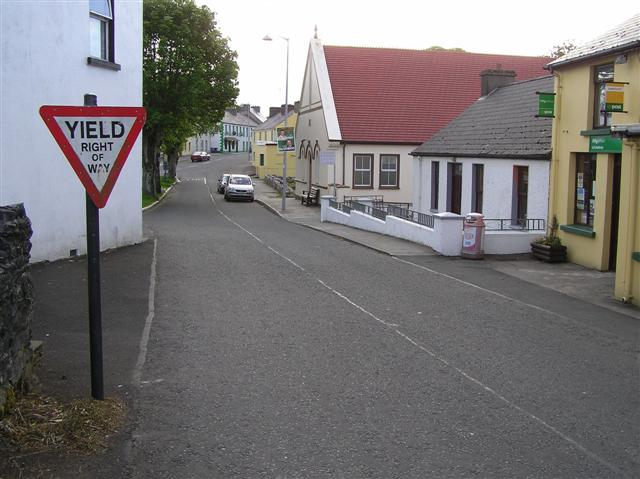
Old yield sign in Culdaff, Inishowen

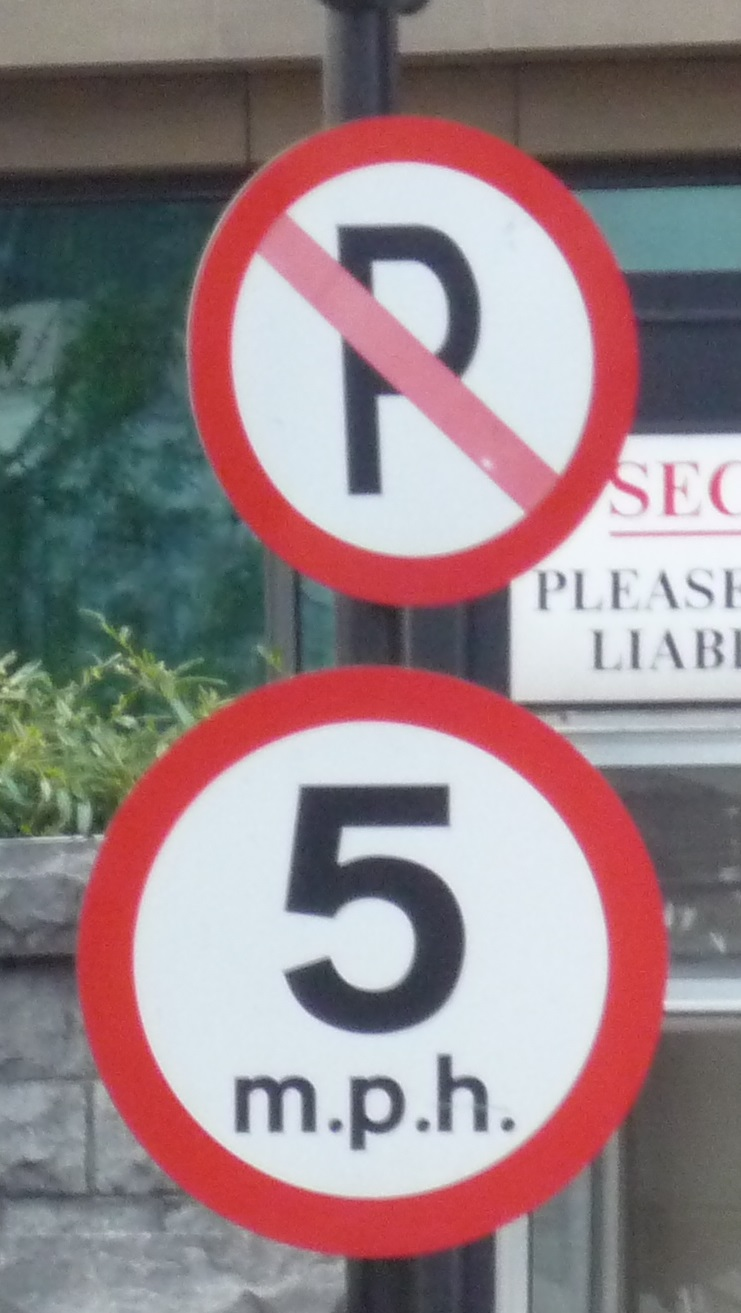
Some rare speed limits are still in mph after 2005. They now read m.p.h. to distinguish them from the metric standard.

Until 1997, all mandatory signs were circular in shape and featured black symbols on a white background with a red border. A unique example was the "keep left" sign, which used a curved arrow pointing upwards. Since the introduction of the 1997 regulations, their design is identical to those used in the United Kingdom, with white symbols on a blue background.

The former "No Entry" sign, a prohibition sign with an upward-pointing arrow, was replaced with the international standard red disk in the 2010 TSM. However the older version, now termed "No Straight Ahead", may be used when combined with a time or other restriction.

Ireland's "Yield" sign formerly read "Yield Right of Way" from 1961 until 1997, and many of this older variant can still be seen around the State. Prior to 1961, it did not feature any inscription.

On 20 January 2005, imperial speed limits on signs were replaced with metric speed limits. Around 35,000 existing signs were modified or replaced and a further 23,000 new signs were erected bearing the speed limit in kilometres per hour. To avoid confusion with the old signs, all speed limit signs include the symbol "km/h" beneath the numerals. Distances, such as those shown on route confirmatory signs, had already been displayed in kilometres since the 1970s. Due to the two speed limits possible on non-urban roads after 2005 metrication, the "end of speed limit" signs in Ireland (a white circle with black diagonal line as used in the UK) is no longer used – the end of an urban speed restriction is signalled by the sign displaying the limit for the following section.

In October 2022, a nine-month long pilot scheme was undertaken by the National Transport Authority to introduce new signs that would replace Belisha beacons on newly installed pedestrian crossings. This scheme saw the introduction of a new blue square-shaped pedestrian crossing sign (featuring a fluorescent yellow background), like those already used in continental Europe. Following the conclusion of the study, the sign was officially adopted in March 2024, though beacons are still permitted to be installed.

=== Warning signs ===
1926 warning sign for an unguarded level crossing

The first warning signs accorded to a standard laid out in the 1926 Road Signs and Traffic Signals Regulations. These signs were similar to signs used in the United Kingdom at that time. The signs were cast-iron plates, with raised type painted red on white. A square pictogram illustrated the hazard, and the type of hazard was written in both Irish, with traditional typeface, and English. A hollow red triangle normally surmounted the pole to which the sign was attached.

Yellow diamond-shaped warning signs made their first appearance following the adoption of the 1956 Traffic Signs Regulations. The shape and colour of these signs—as well as many of the symbols—were chosen to conform to recommendations by the United Nations, based on an eventually unrealised draft convention for international uniformity of road signs which had been in development beforehand.

== Directional information signs ==
=== Design ===
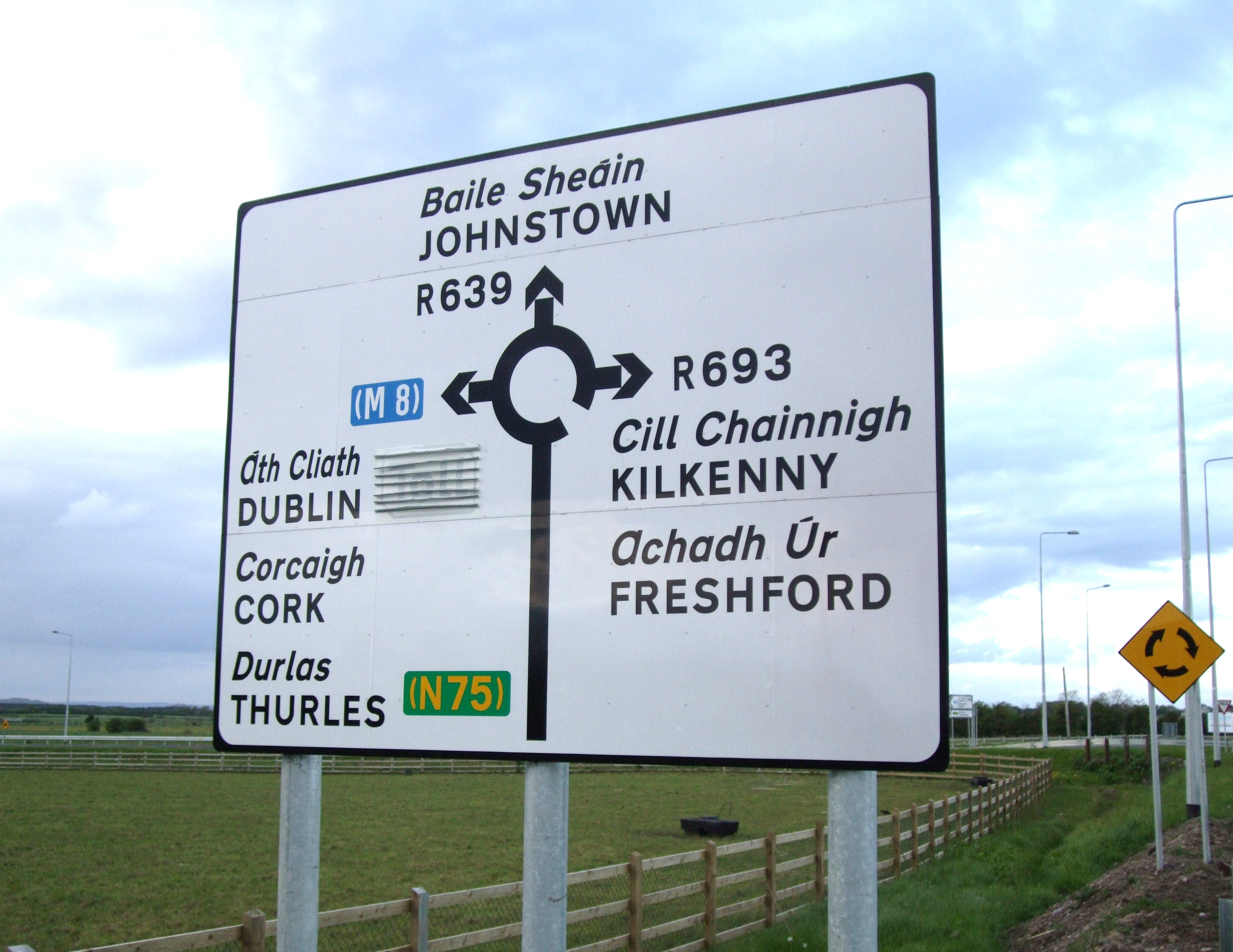
Map type regional road sign, with patching for the N75 and the M8

==== Typeface ====
The Transport and Motorway typefaces are used on Irish road signs. Although it was designed uniquely for dark text on light backgrounds, the Transport Heavy weight is used for all signs in Ireland. A distinctive oblique variant of Transport Heavy is used for Irish text, in which letters are inclined at 15 degrees. The letter "a" is represented by script a ("ɑ"), and the letter "i" was represented by dotless i ("ı") in order to better differentiate them from their accented forms; however, the normal letter "i" is now always used. Additionally, the capitals "A", "M" and "N" are similar in appearance to lowercase "a", "m" and "n".

The Irish text is placed above the corresponding English and is always in mixed case. All English text is in upper case Roman alphabet.

==== Colour ====
Motorway signs use white text on a blue background. National routes (both primary and secondary) use white text on a green background, with the specific route number in yellow text. Regional and local county roads use black text on white background. Signs to points of interest (services, institutions, tourist sights) have white text on a brown background. The use of legend panels (coloured backgrounds for destinations and route numbers) and patches (coloured background containing a route number enclosed in brackets), derived from the Guildford Rules, is used to show roads of different classification on signs.

==== Types of sign available ====
A number of types of sign are available for use on all purpose roads. Chapter 2 of the TSM divides directional information signs into six categories:

1. Stack Type Advance Direction Signs — destinations are signposted in advance of at-grade roads, such as T junctions and staggered crossroads, where the destinations are placed on separate panels.
2. Map Type Advance Direction Signs — destinations are signposted in advance of grade separated interchanges and roundabouts, where the junction is displayed as a pictogram. These are sometimes used at at-grade roads in exceptional circumstances.
3. Direction Signs / Flag Signs — these are located at the road junction itself. The sign has a triangular point at one end and a chevron, and can also appear in the form of a fingerpost, particularly on rural roads.
4. Overhead Gantry and Exit Taper Gantry Signs — destinations are signposted in advance on signs mounted on gantry structures.
5. Route Confirmatory, Route Marker and Route Direction Signs — these provide confirmation and information to drivers about the destinations and route ahead.
6. Other directional information signs, such as Next Exit Signs (which provide a list of destinations to take at the next exit) and Lane Destination Signs.

However, on rural roads, it is common for the appropriate signs to be missing. Often junctions are signed with only a fingerpost.

==== Destination signing policy ====
Generally directional signs on major routes show major or end destinations. Smaller towns and placenames are shown only on signs nearer to that location. Only the Irish place name is shown if the sign is in the Gaeltacht, or the official name in English is identical to the Irish name or nearly so (for example Dún Laoghaire or Port Laoise). Due to the practice of signposting in both languages, usually a limited number of destinations will be signposted. If a destination can be reached by following a route which is a spur from the route travelled, the destination or route number will be shown in brackets on route confirmatory signs. Also, distances are shown in kilometres.

Destinations on motorways and high-quality dual carriageways are signposted as follows:

- 2 km – Next Exit Sign, listing destinations to be reached by this exit
- 1 km – Advance Directional Sign (map type or gantry)
- 500 m – Advance Directional Sign (map type or gantry)
- Beginning of exit taper (deceleration lane) – Exit Taper Gantry Sign
- Gore – Exit Sign with junction number
- 500 m following exit – Route Confirmatory Sign
Map Type Advance Direction Sign

Map Type Advance Direction Sign

Map Type Advance Direction Sign (roundabout)

Stack Type Advance Direction Sign

Direction Sign

Overhead Gantry Sign (non-lane drop)

Overhead Gantry Sign (lane drop)

Exit Taper Gantry Sign

Route Confirmatory Sign

Next Exit Sign

Lane Destination Sign

Exit Sign

== Other information signs ==
Chapter 4 of the TSM divides other information signs into the following categories:

Signs displaying civic or geographical information
Town and Village Sign (national road)

Town and Village Sign (regional/local road)

Town and Village Sign (regional/local road, Gaeltacht)

County Boundary Sign (Type A)

County Boundary Sign (Type B)

River Name Sign with Symbol

Entering a Gaeltacht Area (regional road, with name)

Entering a Gaeltacht Area (national road, without name)
Signs indicating facilities ahead of interest to road users
F 200
Parking

F 202L
Parking Direction

F 203A
Parking Advance Direction

F 204
Disabled Persons' Parking

F 204a
e-Charging

F 205
Bus Parking

F 206
Cycle Parking

F 207R
Park and Ride Direction

F 208L
Park and Ride Advance Direction

F 210
Hospital

F 212
Hospital Direction Sign

F 213
Hospital Advance Direction

F 220
Airport Repeater Sign

Sign F 221L
Airport Direction

F 222A
Airport Advance Direction

F 231L
Station Direction

F 232R
Station Advance Direction

F 260
Garda Station

F 261
Garda Only
Signs indicating traffic calming measures
F 400
Metric Speed Limit Information

F 401
60 km/h Speed Limit Ahead

F 402
Speed Camera Ahead

F 402a
Average Speed Zone

F 402b
Variable Speed Limit Zone (motorway)

F 403
Slow Zone

Warning Traffic Calming Sign

Town Name and Speed Limit Sign
Signs indicating particular road layouts
F 300L
Additional Lane Joining From Left (One to Two Lanes)

F 301R
Additional Lanes Joining From Right (Two to Three Lanes)

F 302L
Additional Lanes Joining From Left - Left Joining Lane Continues (Three to Four Lanes)

F 303R
Additional Lanes Joining From Right - Left Joining Lane Continues (Two to Three Lanes)

F 304L
Additional Lanes Joining From Left - Left Joining Lane Continues (Three to Four Lanes)

F 305R
Additional Lanes Joining From Right - Right Joining Lane Continues (Two to Three Lanes)

F 306L
Additional Lanes Joining From Left - Right Joining Lane Continues (Three to Four Lanes)

F 308
Lane Gain (Three to Four Lanes, 200 m)

F 324
Lane Diverge (Four Lanes)

F 330
Start of Motorway

F 331
Motorway Prohibitions (English)

F 331
Motorway Prohibitions (Irish)

F 332
Start of Motorway Ahead

F 333
End of Motorway

F 334
End of Motorway Ahead

F 340.1
Countdown Marker (motorway, 100 m)

F 340.2
Countdown Marker (motorway, 200 m)

F 340.3
Countdown Marker (motorway, 300 m)

F 350
Cul-de-sac

F 360
Start of Nearside With-Flow Bus Lane

F 361
Start of Offside With-Flow Bus Lane

F 362
Continuous Bus Lane (Two Lanes)
Signs indicating alternative or diversionary routes
F 500
High Vehicle Advance

F 502L
High Vehicle Direction

F 501R
Heavy Vehicle Advance Direction

F 501R
Heavy Vehicle Direction
Services Signs
Bypassed Town Sign
Toll Road Signs
F 700
Toll Road Ahead

F 701
Toll Plaza Ahead

Toll Charge Sign

Toll Lane Demarcation Sign

Toll Plaza Lane Dedication Sign

Toll Plaza Lane Dedication Sign

eToll Awareness Sign
Tunnel Information Signs
F 800
Tunnel Information Sign

F 801
Turn Headlights On

F 802
Tunnel Radio Stations

F 803
Emergency (Tunnel) Lay-by

F 804
Fire Extinguisher and Telephone

F 805
Fire Extinguisher, Telephone and Lay-by

F 806
Emergency Station

F 807
Pedestrian Exit
Miscellaneous Signs
F 901
Tram Information Sign
(Note: Must always be accompanied with supplementary plate P 041)

F 902
Junction Definition Post

F 903
Turn Back

F 904
Authorised Vehicles Only

F 905
Location Reference Indicator Sign
Tourist Attraction Signs
Cycle Route Signs
C 100
Two-Stage Right Turn

== Regulatory signs ==
The three main types of regulatory signs are mandatory, restrictive and prohibitory, all of which are circular in shape. Mandatory signs are white on blue with a white border and restrictive signs are black on a white background, with a red border, while prohibitory signs are similar to restrictive signs in design, but include a red line diagonally bisecting the sign. Regulatory signs were introduced in 1956 with the Traffic Signs Regulations, 1956. Some signs were added later. These signs are laid out in Chapter 5 of the TSM.

Speed limit signs have the speed with the letters "km/h" underneath.

RUS 001
Keep Left

RUS 002
Keep Right

RUS 003
Pass Either Side

RUS 004
Keep Straight Ahead

RUS 005
Turn Right

RUS 006
Turn Left

RUS 007
Turn Left Ahead

RUS 008
Turn Right Ahead

RUS 009
Pedal Cycles Only

RUS 010
Clearway

RUS 011
No Straight Ahead

RUS 012
No Right Turn

RUS 013
No Left Turn

RUS 014
No Overtaking

RUS 015
Maximum Gross Weight (Traffic Management)

RUS 016
Height Restriction

RUS 017
No U-Turn

RUS 018
Parking Permitted

RUS 019
No Parking

RUS 020
Taxi Stand

RUS 020a
Electric Vehicle Parking Permitted

RUS 021
Pedestrianised Street

RUS 026
Yield

RUS 026
Géill Slí (Yield sign in Irish)

RUS 026A
Yield Sign for Cyclists (Note: Cyclists must yield to other road users when proceeding in the direction indicated. When the sign is provided at traffic lights, cyclists may proceed past a red light in the direction indicated, provided they do not endanger other road users.)

RUS 027
Stop

RUS 028
Nearside With-flow Bus Lane

RUS 029
Offside With-flow Bus Lane

RUS 030
Contra-Flow Bus Lane

RUS 031
Bus Stop

RUS 031
Bus Stop

RUS 032
School Warden

RUS 032A
School Street

RUS 033
LRT Speed Limit

RUS 034
LRT Stop

RUS 035
LRT Yield

RUS 036
Nearside Tram Lane

RUS 037
Offside Tram Lane

RUS 038
No Pedestrians

RUS 039
Speed Limit (120 km/h)

RUS 040
Speed Limit (100 km/h)

RUS 041
Speed Limit (80 km/h)

RUS 042
Speed Limit (60 km/h)

RUS 042A
Rural Speed Limit (Note: Indicates a maximum speed of 60 km/h on local tertiary roads. It is never used on its own, it is always accompanied with supplementary plate P 080, Go Mall/SLOW.)

RUS 043
Speed Limit (50 km/h)

RUS 044
Speed Limit (30 km/h)

RUS 046
Prohibited Number of Axles

RUS 047
Prohibited Axles in Right Hand Lane

RUS 049
Mini Roundabout

RUS 050
No Entry

RUS 051
Maximum Vehicle Length

RUS 052
Maximum Vehicle Width

RUS 053
Maximum Gross Weight

RUS 054
Maximum Axle Weight

RUS 055
No Cycles

RUS 056
No Ridden or
Accompanied
Horses

RUS 057
No Horse and Carts

RUS 058
Shared Route for Pedal Cycles and
Pedestrians

RUS 058CL
Segregated Route for Pedal Cycles and Pedestrians (Cycle on Left)

RUS 058CR
Segregated Route for Pedal Cycles and Pedestrians (Cycle on Right)

RUS 059
Contra-flow Cycle Track

RUS 059A
Contra-flow Cycling on One Way Street

RUS 059B
Contra-flow Cycling on One Way Street

RUS 060
Stop (Manual Control)

RUS 061
Go (Manual Control)

RUS 061
Téigh (Manual Control)

RUS 062
No Vehicles Carrying Explosives

RUS 063
Restriction on Parking – Specified Events (Note: 'Specified events' refers to those such as a sporting or entertainment event held at a specified venue or venues. At the end of this restriction, the sign is shown with supplementary plate P 010.)

RUS 064
Speed Limit (40 km/h)

RUS 065
Speed Limit (20 km/h)

RUS 066
Pedestrian Crossing

RUS 067
Parallel/Combined Zebra Crossing

RUS 068
Cycle Street

RUS 068A
End of Cycle Street

RUS 070
Shared Zone

RUS 070A
End of Shared Zone

== Warning signs ==
Warning signs are black on an amber (orangish-yellow) background, and are diamond-shaped. This type of road sign was introduced with the Traffic Signs Regulations, 1956. Some signs were added later, and many types of signs, even common ones, do not appear in any statutes. These signs are laid out in Chapter 6 of the TSM.

Some types of sign (for example, pedestrian/zebra crossing signs) are somewhat randomly designed, and differ between county/city boroughs.

W 001
Crossroads

W 002L
Side Road - Left

W 002R
Side Road - Right

W 003L
T-Junction (Type 1) - Left

W 003R
T-Junction (Type 1) - Right

W 004L
T-Junction (Type 2) - Left

W 004R
T-Junction (Type 2) - Right

W 005L
Y-Junction - Left

W 005R
Y-Junction- Right

W 006L
Crossroads at Sharp Corner - Left

W 006R
Crossroads at Sharp Corner - Right

W 007LR
Staggered Junctions - Left/Right

W 007RL
Staggered Junctions - Right/Left

W 008L
Two Junctions on Left

W 008R
Two Junctions on Right

W 009L
Side Road on Outside of Bend - Left

W 009R
Side Road on Outside of Bend - Right

W 010L
Side Road on Inside of Bend - Left

W 010R
Side Road on Inside of Bend - Right

W 011L
Crossroads on Bend - Left

W 011R
Crossroads on Bend - Right

W 012L
Side Road on Dual C'way - Left (with CR Break)

W 012R
Side Road on Dual C'way - Right (with CR Break)

W 013
Side Road on Dual C'way - (No CR Break)

W 014
Crossroads on Dual C'way

W 015
Crossroads (Major Road) Ahead

W 016
T Junction (Major Road) Ahead

W 017L
Staggered Crossroads Ahead - Left

W 017R
Staggered Crossroads Ahead - Right

W 018L
Junction With Major Road at Sharp Corner - Left

W 018R
Junction With Major Road at Sharp Corner - Right

W 019
Crossroads Ahead at Dual C'way

W 020
T Junction Ahead at Dual C'way (With CR Break)

W 021L
Staggered Crossroads Ahead at Dual C'way - Left

W 021R
Staggered Crossroads Ahead at Dual C'way - Right

W 022
T Junction Ahead at Dual C'way (No CR Break)

W 030
Merging Traffic From Left

W 031
Merging with Traffic on Right

W 032
Merging and Diverging Traffic

W 033
Loop

W 034
Compact Junction

W 040
Stop Ahead

W 041
Yield Ahead

W 042
Traffic Signals

W 043
Roundabout Ahead

W 044
Mini Roundabout Ahead

W 050L
Sharp Corner - Left

W 050R
Sharp Corner - Right

W 051L
Sharp Bend - Left

W 051R
Sharp Bend - Right

W 052L
Series of Sharp Corners - Left

W 052R
Series of Sharp Corners - Right

W 053L
Series of Sharp Bends - Left

W 053R
Series of Sharp Bends - Right

W 061L
Single Chevron - Left

W 061R
Single Chevron - Right

W 062L
Multiple Chevrons (Two) - Left

W 062R
Multiple Chevrons (Two) - Right

W 063L
Multiple Chevrons (Three) - Left

W 063R
Multiple Chevrons (Three) - Right

W 070L
Road Narrows on Left

W 070R
Road Narrows on Right

W 071
Road Narrows on Both Sides

W 080
Two-way Traffic

W 081
Two-way Traffic Crossing

W 082
Three Lanes of Traffic (Two With, One Against)

W 083
Three Lanes of Traffic (One With, Two Against)

W 091L
Lane Loss (Two to One Lane) - Left

W 091R
Lane Loss (Two to One Lane) - Right

W 092L
Lane Loss (Three to Two Lanes) - Left

W 092R
Lane Loss (Three to Two Lanes) - Right (with 200m panel)

W 093L
Lane Loss (Four to Three Lanes) - Left (with 400m panel)

W 093R
Lane Loss (Four to Three Lanes) - Right

W 094
Road Divides

W 095
Dual Carriageway Ends

W 100
Start of Passing Lane

W 101
One-Lane Section

W 102
Two-Lane Section

W 103
Start of Climbing Lane

W 105
Steep Descent

W 106
Steep Ascent

W 110
Restricted Headroom

W 111
Overhead Electrical Cables

W 112
Maximum Vehicle Length

W 113
Maximum Vehicle Width

W 114
Maximum Gross Weight (Traffic Management)

W 115
Maximum Gross Weight

W 116
Maximum Axle Weight

W 117
Prohibited Number of Axles

W 120
Level Crossing With Flashing Red Signals

W 121
Level Crossing With No Flashing Red Signals

W 122.1L
Level Crossing Countdown Marker (100 m) (Note: The diagonal bars are reversed if the sign is placed on the other side of the carriageway.)

W 122.2L
Level Crossing Countdown Marker (200 m)

W 122.3L
Level Crossing Countdown Marker (300 m)

W 123
Risk of Grounding

W 124
Tram Crossing

W 125
Tram Advisory Speed

W 126
Level Crossing with No Flashing Red Signal – User Operated

W 130
Road Hump

W 131
Road Depression

W 132
Humpback Bridge

W 133
Uneven Road

W 134
Slippery Road

W 135
Soft Verge

W 140
Pedestrians

W 140A
Pedestrians Crossing

W 141
School Ahead

W 142
Children Crossing

W 143
Cyclists

W 144
Slippery for Cyclists

W 145
Cyclists Dismount

W 146
Pedestrian/Cycle Crossing

W 150
Accompanied Horses

W 151
Cattle or Farm Animals

W 152
Sheep

W 153
Deer or Wild Animals

W 154
Jaunting Cars

W 160
Unprotected Water

W 161
Ford

W 162
Tunnel

W 163
Queues Likely

W 164
Falling Rocks

W 165
Low-flying Aircraft

W 166
Crosswind

W 167
Opening Bridge

W 168
Tractors

W 169
Drive on Left (Entry Point)

W 169A
Drive on Left (Repeater)

W 170
Other Hazard

W 183
Barrier Board - 3 Bars

W 184
Barrier Board - 4 Bars

W 185
Barrier Board - 5 Bars

== Roadwork signs ==
Road works hazard signs are reddish orange. Lane closure signs are diamond shaped for Level 1 roads (Urban and Low Speed Roads) and Level 2 roads (Rural Single Carriageway Roads), and square shaped for Level 3 Roads (Dual Carriageways and Motorways).

WK 001
Roadworks Ahead

WK 010
One-lane Crossover (Out)

WK 011
One-lane Crossover (Back)

WK 012
Move to Left (One Lane)

WK 013
Move to Right (One Lane)

WK 014
Move to Left (Two Lanes)

WK 014A
Move to Left (Three Lanes)

WK 015
Move to Right (Two Lanes)

WK 015A
Move to Right (Three Lanes)

WK 016
Obstruction Between Lanes

WK 017
End of Obstruction Between Lanes

WK 018
Start of Central Reserve or Obstruction

WK 019
End of Central Reserve or Obstruction

WK 020
Lanes Diverge at Crossover

WK 021
Lanes Rejoin at Crossover

WK 022
Two-lane Crossover (Out)

WK 023
Two-lane Crossover (Back)

WK 024
Merge to the Right

WK 030
Single Lane (for Shuttle Working)

WK 031
Two-way Traffic

WK 032
Road Narrows on Left

WK 033
Road Narrows on Right

WK 034
Road Narrows on Both Sides

WK 035
Merging Traffic from Left

WK 040
Lane 2 of 2 Closed (Level 3)

WK 040A
Lane 2 of 2 Closed (Level 1)

WK 041
Lane 1 of 2 Closed (Level 3)

WK 041A
Lane 1 of 2 Closed (Level 1)

WK 042
Lane 3 of 3 Closed (Level 3)

WK 042A
Lane 3 of 3 Closed (Level 1)

WK 043
Lane 1 of 3 Closed (Level 3)

WK 043A
Lane 1 of 3 Closed (Level 1)

WK 044
Lanes 2 & 3 of 3 Closed (Level 3)

WK 044A
Lanes 2 & 3 of 3 Closed (Level 1)

WK 045
Lanes 1 & 2 of 3 Closed (Level 3)

WK 045A
Lanes 1 & 2 of 3 Closed (Level 1)

WK 046
Lane 4 of 4 Closed (Level 3)

WK 047
Lane 1 of 4 Closed (Level 3)

WK 048
Lanes 3 & 4 of 4 Closed (Level 3)

WK 049
Lanes 1 & 2 of 4 Closed (Level 3)

WK 050
Side Road on Left

WK 051
Side Road on Right

WK 052
Site Access

WK 060
Temporary Traffic Signals

WK 061
Flagman Ahead

WK 062
Queues Likely

WK 070
Hump or Ramp

WK 071
Uneven Surface

WK 072
Slippery Road

WK 073
Loose Chippings

WK 074
Soft Verge

WK 080
Pedestrians Cross to Left

WK 081
Pedestrians Cross to Right

WK 082
Temporary Pedestrian Crossing

WK 084
Cyclists Keep Left

WK 085
Cyclists Keep Right

WK 086
Cyclists

WK 087
Slippery for Cyclists

WK 090
Detour

WK 091
Diverted Traffic (Left)

WK 091
Diverted Traffic (Right)

WK 091
Diverted Traffic (Upper Left)

WK 091
Diverted Traffic (Upper Right)

WK 091
Diverted Traffic (Straight)

WK 092
End of Detour

WK 093
Detour Destination

WK 094
Road Closed

WK 095
Stop Here On Red

WK 096
Free Recovery

WK 097
Free Recovery End

WK 098
Convoy System in Operation

WK 099
Follow Me

WK 100
Lane 2 of 2 Narrow (advance)

WK 101
Lane 3 of 3 Narrow (advance)

WK 102
Lanes 2 & 3 of 3 Narrow (advance)

WK 105
Lane 2 of 2 Narrow

WK 106
Lane 3 of 3 Narrow

WK 107
Lanes 2 & 3 of 3 Narrow

WK 110
Lane 2 of 2 Closed MLC (Note: MLC stands for mobile lane closure. These signs are mounted onto the trailer of a moving vehicle.)

WK 111
Lane 1 of 2 Closed MLC

WK 112
Lane 3 of 3 Closed MLC

WK 113
Lane 1 of 3 Closed MLC

WK 114
Lanes 1 & 2 of 3 Closed MLC

WK 115
Lanes 2 & 3 of 3 Closed MLC

WK 116
Lane 4 of 4 Closed MLC

WK 117
Lane 1 of 4 Closed MLC

WK 118
Lanes 1 & 2 of 4 Closed MLC

WK 119
Lanes 3 & 4 of 4 Closed MLC

== Supplementary plates ==
Supplementary plates are used in addition to warning, regulatory and roadworks signs. Their purpose is to provide additional information to the sign they are placed beneath (with sign P 056 being an exception, which is placed on its own as it contains a regulatory sign).

P 001
Distance

P 002
Length

P 003L
Direction - Left

P 003R
Direction - Right

P 004L
Direction and Distance - Left

P 004R
Direction and Distance - Right

P 005
Both Ways

P 010
End

P 011
Cautionary Speed

P 040
Reduce Speed Now

P 041
LRT Information

P 042
Cycle Network Arrow

P 050
Exceptions (Note: Text for this sign is variable. Permitted variants are outlined in the TSM.)

P 051
Periods of Operation

P 052
Pedestrian Zone

P 053
Parking

P 054
km/h

P 055
24-Hour Operation

P 056
Zonal No Parking (Note: At the end of the restriction, "Ceantar/ZONE" is substituted with "Críoch/END".)

P 057
Time Limit

P 060
Oncoming Traffic

P 061
Another Train Coming

P 062
Long Low Vehicles

P 063
Traffic Calming Ahead

P 064
Tram Track

P 065
Oil Spill

P 066
Ice

P 067
Safe Headroom

P 068
Turn Off Engine When Stopped

P 069
Hazard

P 070
Hazard - Direction and Distance

P 071
Safe Overtaking of Cyclists 1.5m

P 071a
Safe Overtaking of Cyclists 1.0m

P 072
Train Level Crossing (Note: Only used with sign W 072. Placed 100m, 200m and 300m before the crossing.)

P 080
Slow

The following supplementary plates are used exclusively for roadworks signs:

P 081
Concealed Entrance

P 082
Type of Works (used for sign WK 001)

P 083
Use Shoulder

P 084
Shoulder Closed

P 085
Unfinished Road Surface

P 086
On Slip Road

== Traffic signals ==
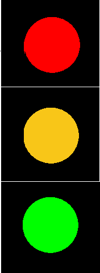
RTS 001
3 aspect standard traffic signal

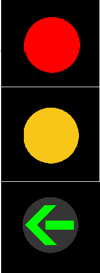
RTS 002
Green left turn 3 aspect traffic signal

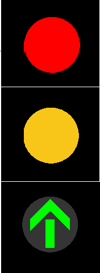
RTS 002
Green go straight 3 aspect traffic signal

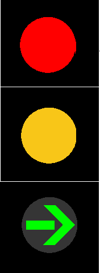
RTS 002
Green right turn 3 aspect traffic signal

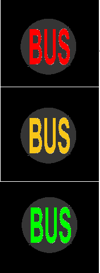
RTS 002
3 aspect bus traffic signal

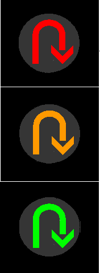
RTS 002
3 aspect U-turn traffic signal

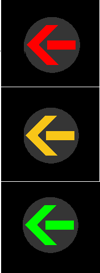
RTS 002
3 aspect left turn traffic signal

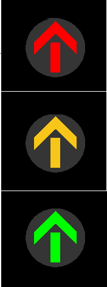
RTS 002
3 aspect go straight traffic signal

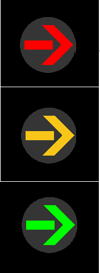
RTS 002
3 aspect right turn traffic signal

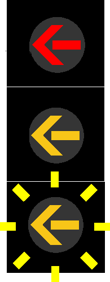
RTS 004
3 aspect flashing amber left turn traffic signal (preferred)

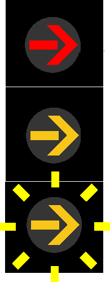
RTS 004
3 aspect flashing amber right turn traffic signal (preferred)

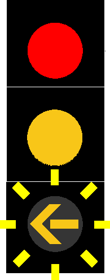
RTS 004
3 aspect flashing amber left turn traffic signal (alternative)

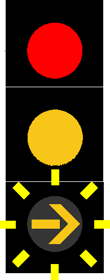
RTS 004
3 aspect flashing amber right turn traffic signal (alternative)

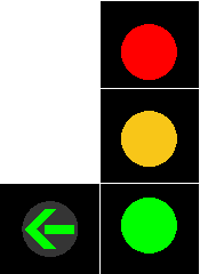
RTS 003
4 aspect traffic signal with green left turn

RTS 003
4 aspect traffic signal with green left turn

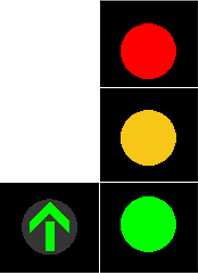
RTS 003
4 aspect traffic signal with green go straight

RTS 003
4 aspect traffic signal with green go straight

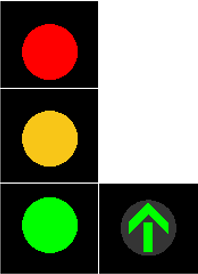
RTS 003
4 aspect traffic signal with green go straight

RTS 003
4 aspect traffic signal with green right turn

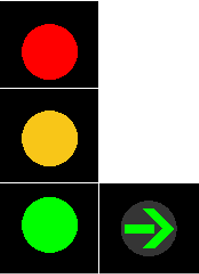
RTS 003
4 aspect traffic signal with green right turn

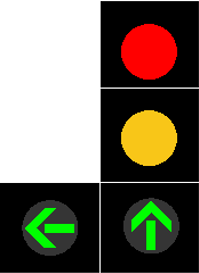
RTS 003
4 aspect traffic signal with green left turn and go straight

RTS 003
4 aspect traffic signal with green left turn and go straight

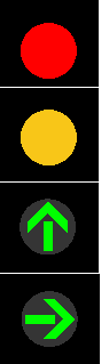
RTS 003
4 aspect traffic signal with green right turn and go straight

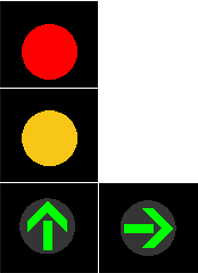
RTS 003
4 aspect traffic signal with green right turn and go straight

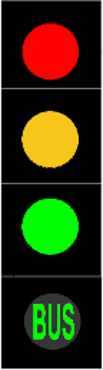
RTS 003
4 aspect traffic signal with green bus

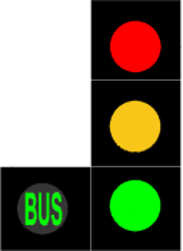
RTS 003
4 aspect traffic signal with green bus

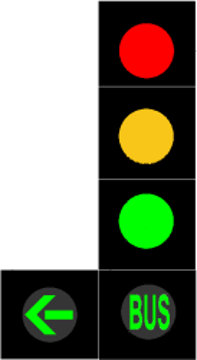
RTS 013
5 aspect traffic signal with bus and arrow

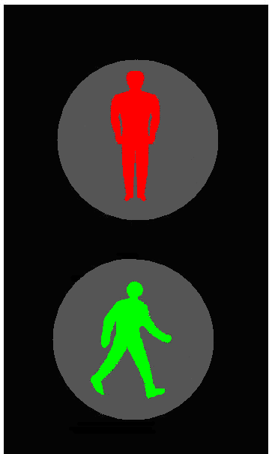
RPC 003
2 aspect pedestrian signal

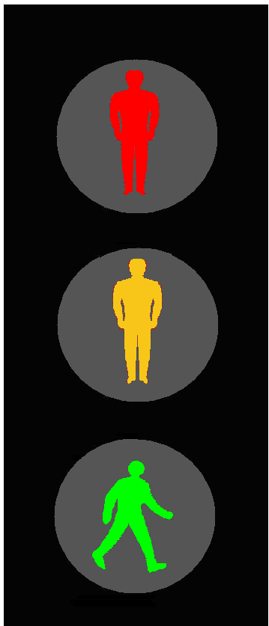
RPC 004
3 aspect pedestrian signal

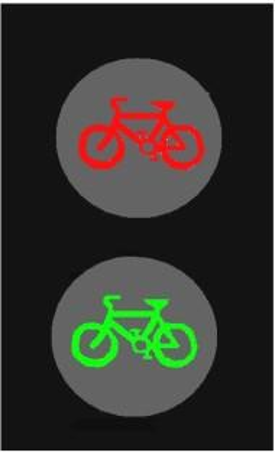
RTS 006
2 aspect cycle signal

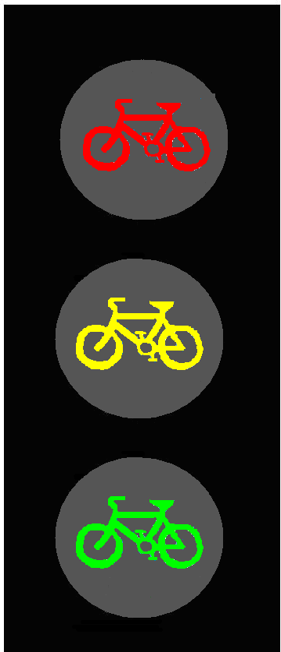
RTS 007
3 aspect cycle signal

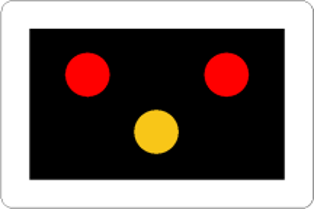
RTS 005
Railway crossing signal

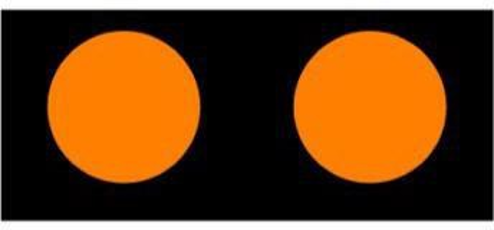
S 102
Flashing amber signal

== Rural speed limit sign ==
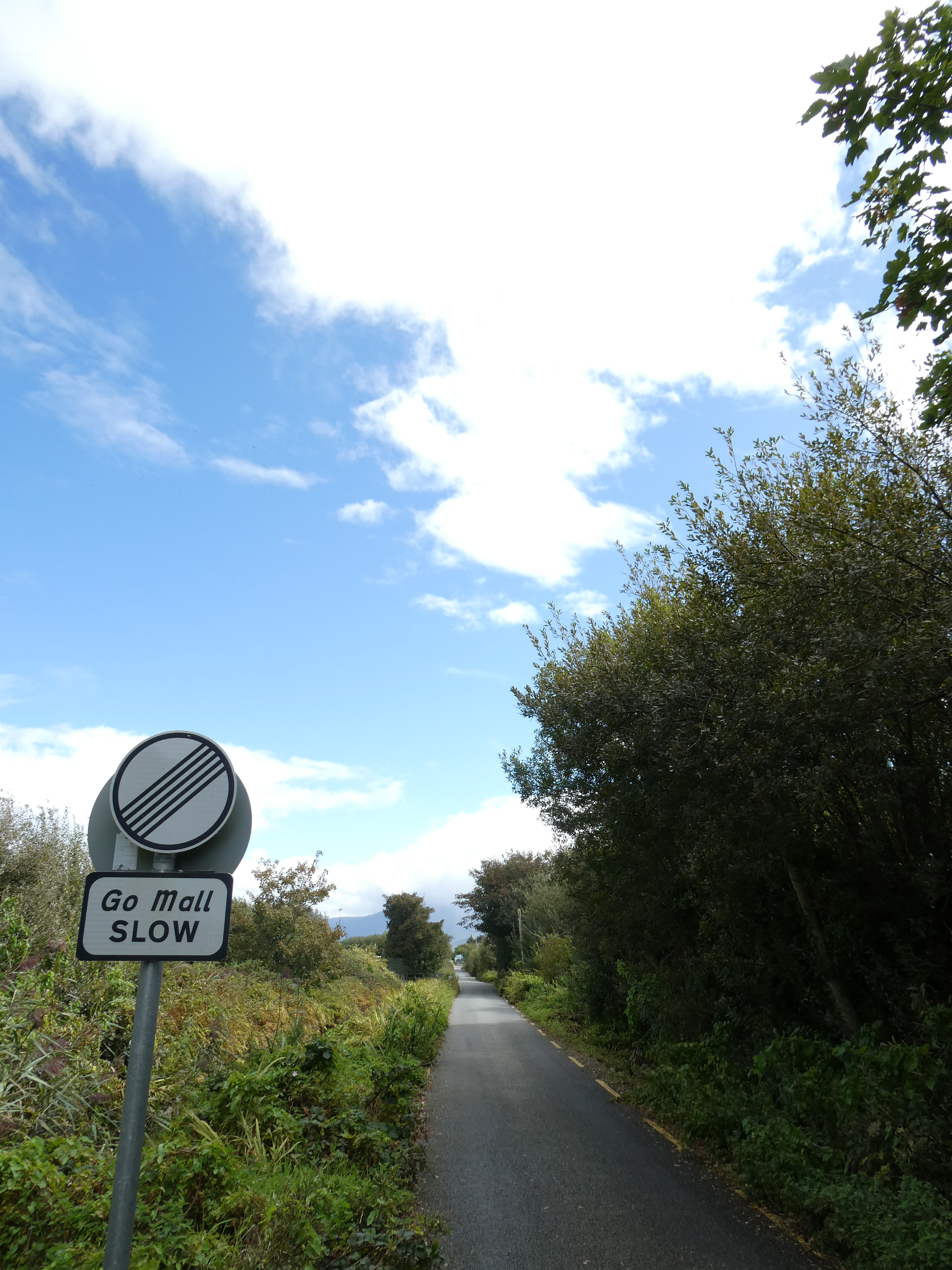
The rural speed limit sign in use on a narrow local road

The rural speed limit sign is a traffic sign used to indicate the maximum speed limit on certain local roads in Ireland. The sign first appeared on such roads in 2015 as an alternative to the 80 km/h (50 mph) speed limit sign to avoid displaying a number or visual 'target'. The speed limit it indicates was changed to 60 km/h (37 mph) following a reduction of speed limits on local roads in February 2025.

The rural speed limit sign consists of a 450 mm (18 in) diameter white disk with a black border and oblique parallel black bars, accompanied by a supplementary plate bilingually reading "Go Mall/SLOW". The sign indicates a legal speed limit of 60 km/h (37 mph), and is described as being an alternative design to the typical 60 km/h speed limit sign for use on local roads. The design is based on the "end of all local prohibitions imposed on moving vehicles" sign from the Vienna Convention on Road Signs and Signals, and was chosen in order to remove the "visual 'target'" – drivers are instead expected to use their judgement while not exceeding the speed limit. It can only be used on single-lane local tertiary roads and selected single-lane local secondary roads and not on national, regional, or local primary roads.

=== Background ===
The metrication of speed limits in 2005 saw the abolition of the "general speed limit"/"end of speed limit" sign, a white circular sign with a single diagonal black stripe which imposed a 60 mph (97 km/h) speed limit, and the implementation of default speed limits to each classification of road. Given the extent of the Irish road network, a maximum speed limit of 80 km/h (50 mph) was thus applied to local roads (as well as regional roads) regardless of whether it was appropriate.

A speed limit review published in 2013 found signposting this speed limit on certain local roads, in particular boreens, to be inappropriate. It recommended the introduction of a "rural speed limit" sign to emphasise that the legal maximum speed was not necessarily a safe one. The sign was officially introduced in 2014 and began appearing on roads following the publication of the Guidelines for Setting and Managing Speed Limits in Ireland in 2015. It was expected that it would replace the existing 80 km/h signs at a cost of €8 million.

On 7 February 2025, in line with the reduction of the maximum speed limit on local roads from 80 km/h to 60 km/h, the meaning of the rural speed limit was also changed.

=== Comprehension and criticism ===
The sign was subject to two awareness campaigns by the Road Safety Authority: one following its introduction and one following the reduction of speed limits on local roads in 2025.

The sign, particularly its design, has been subject to criticism and has been deemed confusing for both Irish and visiting motorists.

A 2024 survey found that the sign was recognised by only 37% of Irish motorists, with 32% identifying it as a speed limit sign.

== See also ==
- Roads in Ireland
- Transport Infrastructure Ireland
- Speed limits in Ireland
- Transport in Ireland
