= Speed limits in Ireland =

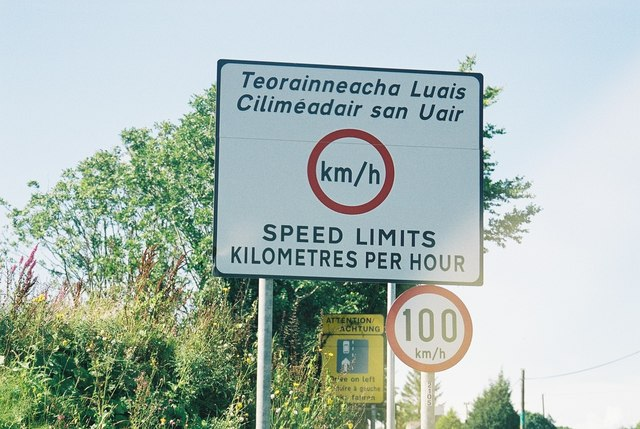
Sign at the Irish border indicating that limits in the Republic of Ireland are denominated in km/h

Speed limits in Ireland apply on all public roads in the state. These are regulated in the Road Traffic Act 2004, and are signposted and legislated for in kilometres per hour.

Speed limits are demarcated by regulatory road signs. These consist of white circular signs with a red outline. Speed limits are marked in black with "km/h" below the speed limit. Smaller "repeater" speed limit signs are used along stretches of road where there is no change in speed limit, in order to remind motorists currently on the road and to inform traffic merging from junctions that a certain speed limit applies.

== History ==
The first speed limits in Ireland were introduced prior to independence, by regulations made in 1876 under the Dublin Traffic Act 1875, which prescribed speed limits of 6 mph (9.7 km/h) for certain vehicles. The Light Locomotives on Highways (Ireland) Order 1896 then set a maximum national speed limit of 12 mph (19 km/h) with a speed limit of 6 mph (9.7 km/h) for traffic in villages, towns and the Dublin Metropolitan Police District. Vehicles weighing more than 2 tons (unladen) were restricted to 5 mph (8.0 km/h) in these areas. This situation was updated in 1933 with Road Traffic Act 1933 prescribing an ordinary speed limit of 25 mph (40 km/h) for light motor vehicles or heavy motor vehicles fitted with pneumatic tyres. Lower speed limits were applied for heavy motor vehicles without some pneumatic tyres, or used for pulling another vehicle. Road signage was established by the Traffic Signs Regulations, 1956.

However, the main piece of legislation responsible for the introduction of speed limits in Ireland was Part IV of the Road Traffic Act, 1961. This repealed the 1933 Act and allowed the Minister for the Environment to prescribe a general speed limit through regulations made under this Act. It also allowed local authorities to specify special speed limits through regulations made under this Act. The first regulations made were the Road Traffic (Speed Limits) Regulations, 1963 which set down a speed limit of 50 mph (80 km/h) for all roads except those subject to a built up area speed limit of 30 mph (48 km/h) or special speed limit of 40 mph (64 km/h). Throughout the mid to late 1960s local authorities studied roads in their areas and had regulations drafted specifically for their county which prescribed speed limits of 30 mph (48 km/h) and 40 mph (64 km/h) along specifically named roads in their administrative area.

On 1 April 1969 the Minister for the Environment through the Road Traffic (General Speed Limit) Regulations, 1969 finally prescribed a general national speed limit of 60 mph (97 km/h) on all roads except those subject to special and built up area speed limits of 40 mph (64 km/h) and 30 mph (48 km/h). This replaced the 50 mph (80 km/h) speed limit in all but a few cases where regulations had been drafted specifically to impose a 50 mph (80 km/h) limit. While the built up area and special speed limits were clearly indicated to motorists by the number 30, 40 or 50 in black numbers on a white circular background with a red outline, there was no such signage for the general 60 mph (97 km/h) speed limit. This was indicated to motorists by a "general speed limit" applies sign which consisted of a circular white sign with a black diagonal line bisecting it. The general limit was reduced to 55 mph (89 km/h) in 1979 as an energy conservation measure during the 1979 energy crisis. Some drivers remained unaware of this change. A review of speed limits from 1990 to 1992 restored the 60 mph limit.

It was not until 1992 that a 70 mph (113 km/h) speed limit was authorised on the State's motorways. This occurred through the Road Traffic (Speed Limits) (County of Kildare) (Amendment) Regulations, 1992 and the similar Road Traffic (Speed Limits) (County Borough of Dublin and County of Dublin) (Amendment) Regulations, 1992. This authorised traffic on the M1, M7, M11 and M50 to travel at 70 mph (113 km/h) where signposted. This was extended to motorways in general by the Road Traffic Act, 1994. A minimum speed limit of 30 mph (48 km/h) had previously been set in 1974.

On 20 January 2005, Ireland adopted metric speed limits. Around 35,000 existing signs were replaced and a further 23,000 new signs erected bearing the speed limit in kilometres per hour. To avoid confusion with the old signs, each speed limit sign now has "km/h" beneath the numerals.

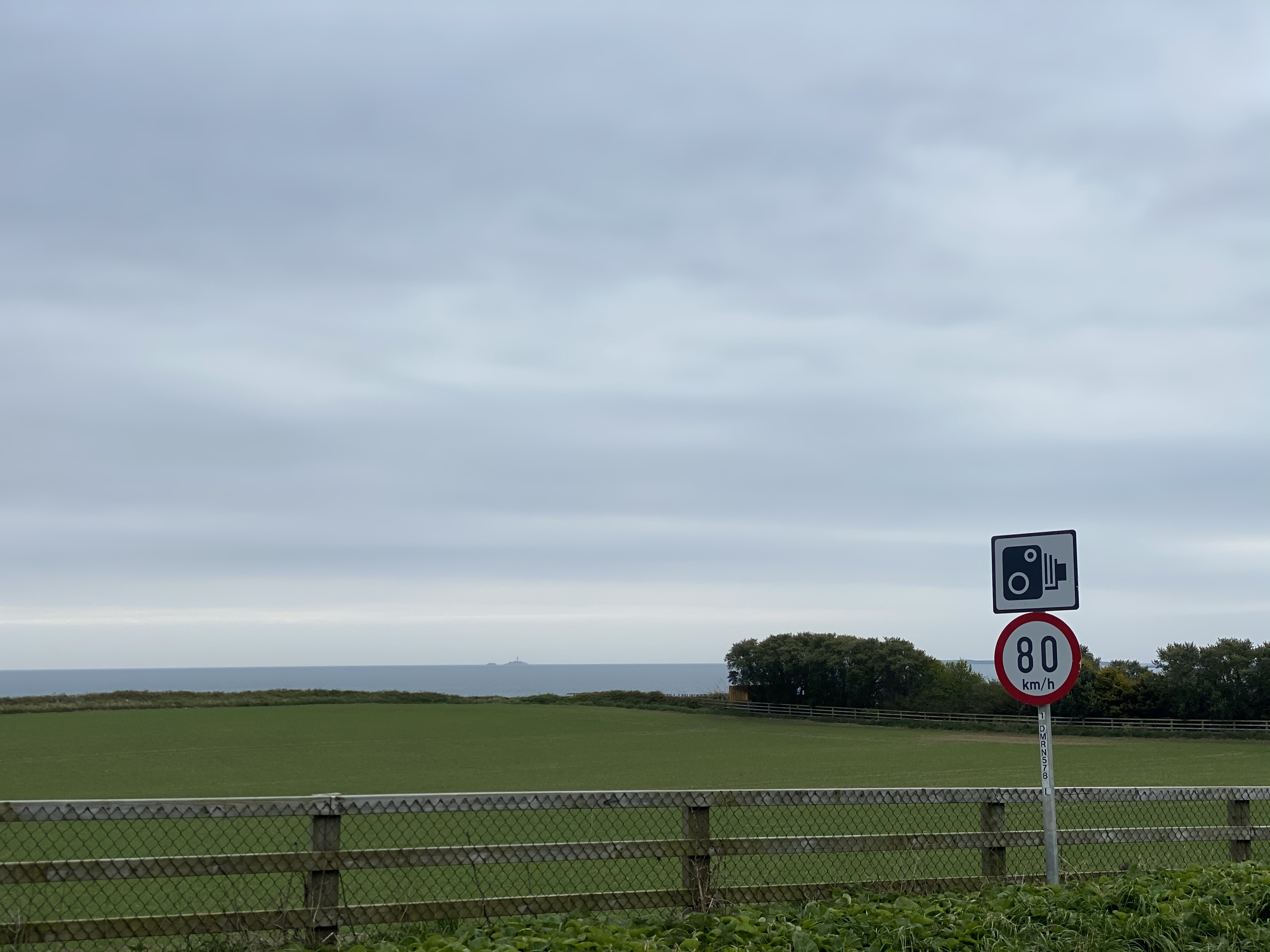
80 km/h speed sign with an additional sign which indicates that this section of road is patrolled for speeding

In February 2012 Leo Varadkar, then Minister for Transport, Tourism and Sport, tasked a working group with reviewing speed-limit policy and implementation. Its report, published in 2013, identified two key issues: inconsistency of limits between similar roads, and inappropriateness of limits on some roads. It found the default limits were unsafely high on many minor roads where they applied. It recommended the introduction of a "rural speed limit" sign, to emphasise that the statutory maximum speed was not necessarily a safe speed.

== Ordinary speed limits ==
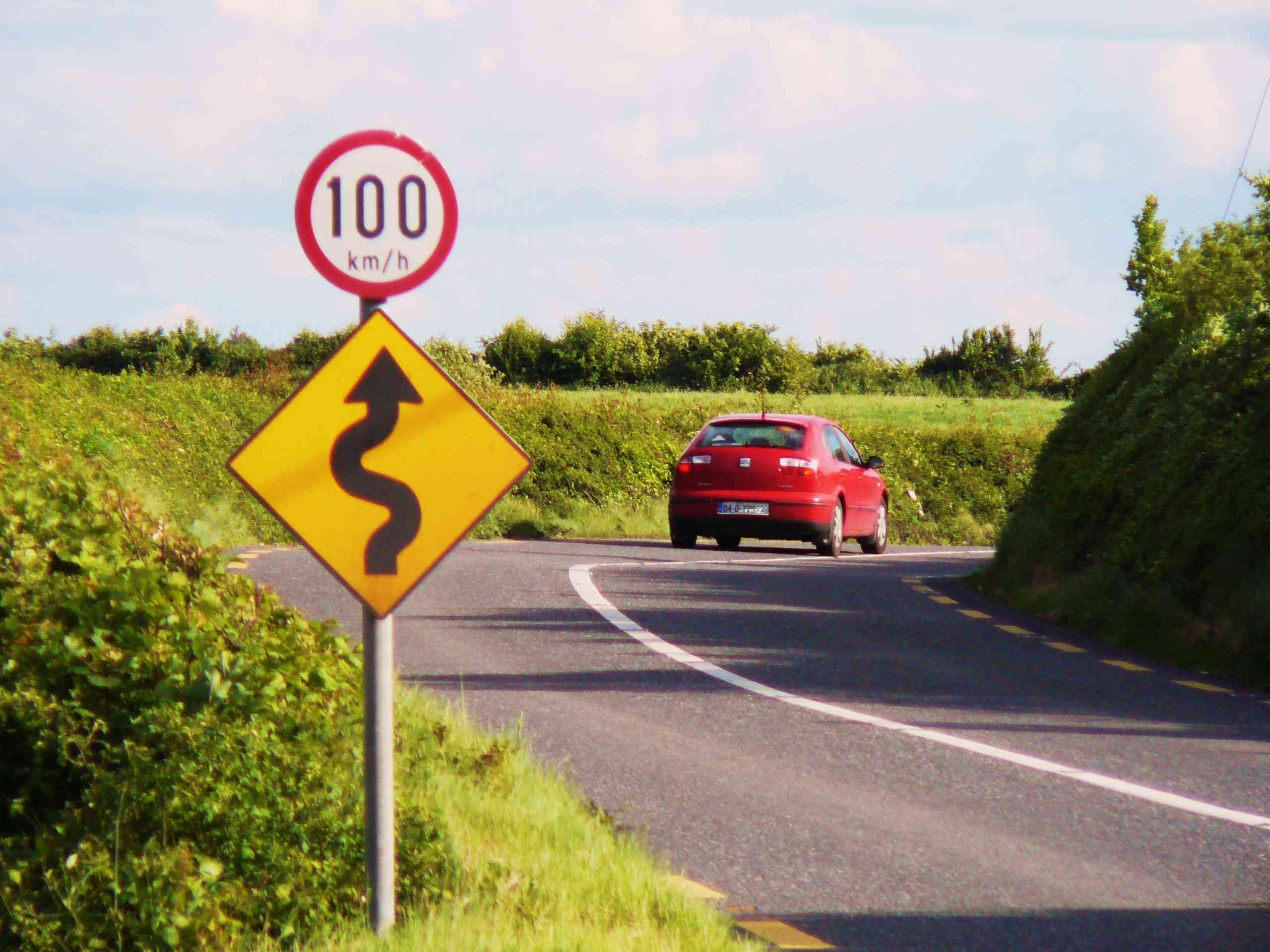
100 km/h sign on a national route

Different default speed limits apply to particular categories of roads. Default speed limits are termed as "ordinary speed limits" by the Road Traffic Act 2004. There are also speed restrictions for certain classes of vehicles. Speed limits for national secondary roads and in built-up areas are due to decrease later in 2025. As of February 2025, following the enactment of the Road Traffic Act 2024, the ordinary speed limits are as follows:

- 120 km/h (75 mph) for motorways
- 100 km/h (62 mph) for national routes (primary and secondary) that are not motorway status.
- 80 km/h (50 mph) for regional roads.
- 60 km/h (37 mph) for local roads.
- 50 km/h (31 mph) in built up areas.

== Special speed limits ==
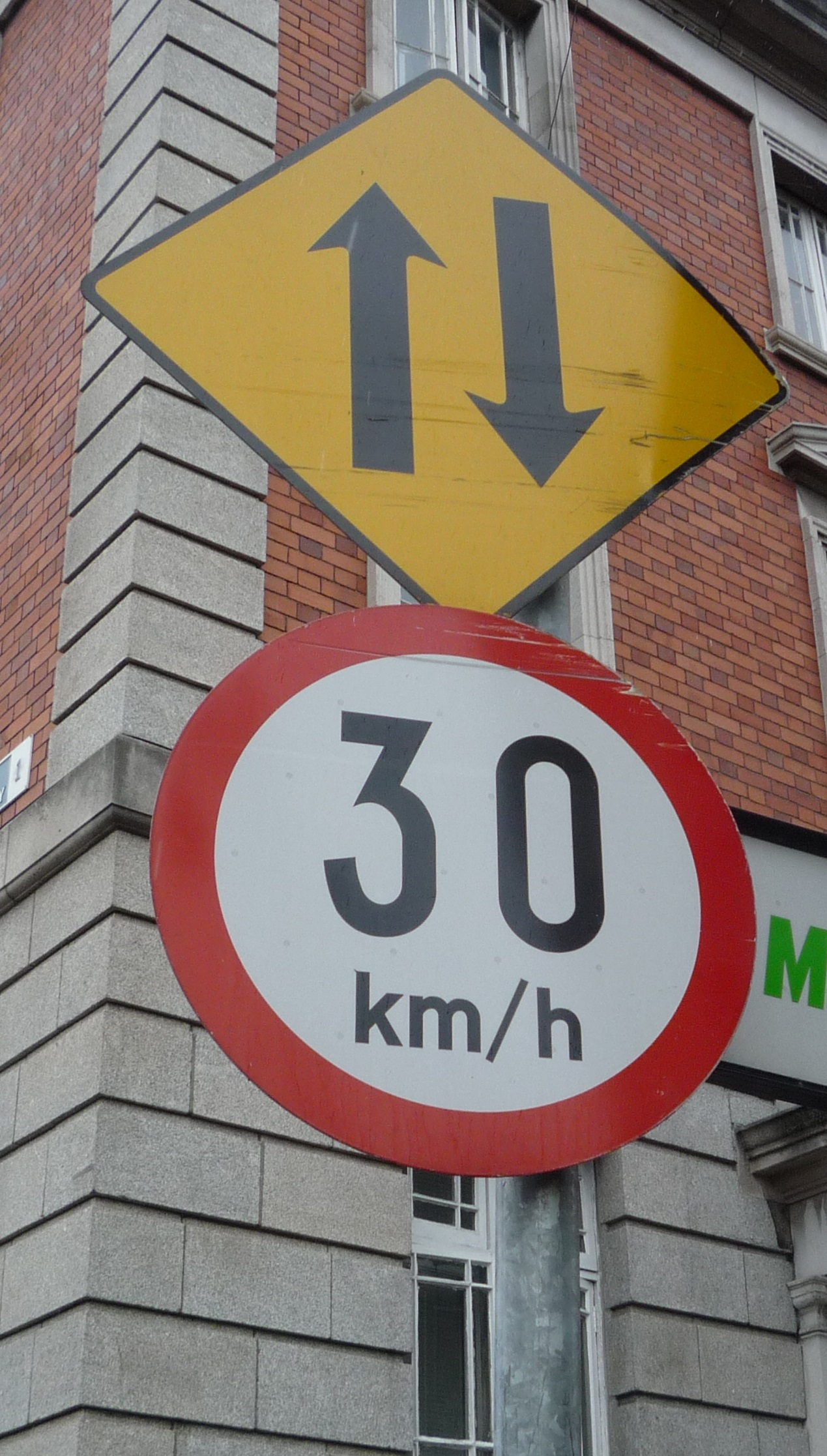
30 km/h sign

- 120 km/h (75 mph) (for select dual carriageways forming part of a national road only)
- 60 km/h (37 mph)
- 40 km/h (25 mph)
- 30 km/h (19 mph)

There are particular powers available to local county councils under the Road Traffic Act 2004 to apply "special speed limits" to particular stretches of road. Special speed limits of 30, 50, 60, 80, 100 and 120 km/h (19, 31, 37, 50, 62 and 75 mph) can be imposed, but only 30 and 60 km/h (19 and 37 mph) are exclusively "special" as opposed to the others which are "ordinary". The 120 km/h (75 mph) limit is ordinary for motorways but can be special for dual carriageways forming part of a national primary road. Special speed limits are usually lower than normal, for schools, etc. One instance of higher speed limits being applied is that of the N2 route from the M50 motorway in Fingal to north of Ashbourne, County Meath where a special speed limit of 120 km/h (75 mph) was imposed from 15 June 2006, therefore becoming the first non-motorway road in Ireland to obtain this speed limit, prior to being designated a motorway itself. The 2004 Act has therefore allowed local authorities to get around such issues as the implications of motorway restrictions on learner drivers as under this act such drivers are now permitted to travel at speeds up to 120 km/h (75 mph) on such roads. The N1 dual carriageway north of Dundalk has also recently been granted a special speed limit of 120 km/h (75 mph), in line with its preceding M1 motorway. As of 2 March 2007, Cork County Council and Limerick city and county councils have published amendments to local bye-laws to adjust several high-quality dual carriageways' speed limits to 120 km/h (75 mph). An amendment to the Road Traffic (Signs) Regulations in 2012 allowed a new speed limit of 40 km/h (25 mph) to be applied by a city or county council.

== Cautionary speed limits ==
Cautionary speed limit sign

A 2007 update of chapter 8 of the Traffic Signs Manual saw the introduction of signage indicating a cautionary speed limit in the vicinity of road works. These speed limits are purposely different from legally enforceable speed limits and always display a speed limit that ends in 5; they are – 25 km/h (16 mph), 35 km/h (22 mph), 45 km/h (28 mph), 55 km/h (34 mph), 65 km/h (40 mph) and 75 km/h (47 mph). The sign—a supplementary plate—is used in addition to a warning sign, namely the "start of road works", "loose chippings' and "slippery road" signs. Outside of road works, the sign may be used with the "loop" or "slippery road" warning signs where the danger may not be apparent to drivers. They are not legally binding on motorists or legally enforceable by the Garda Síochána and it is not known if 'compliance' with these cautionary speed limits is taken into account in the event of a road traffic collision; however, motorists must always drive at a speed appropriate to the prevailing conditions whilst not exceeding the speed limit.

== Road works speed limits ==
The manager of a city or county council can reduce the speed limit on a road undergoing road works for a stated period of time by executive order under powers available to them under the Road Traffic Act 2004. The reduced speed limits are typically 30, 50 or 90 km/h (19, 31 or 56 mph). These are different from cautionary speed limits as they are binding on drivers and it is an offence to exceed a road works speed limit.

== See also ==
- Road signs in Ireland
