= Mileage sign =

Type of road sign

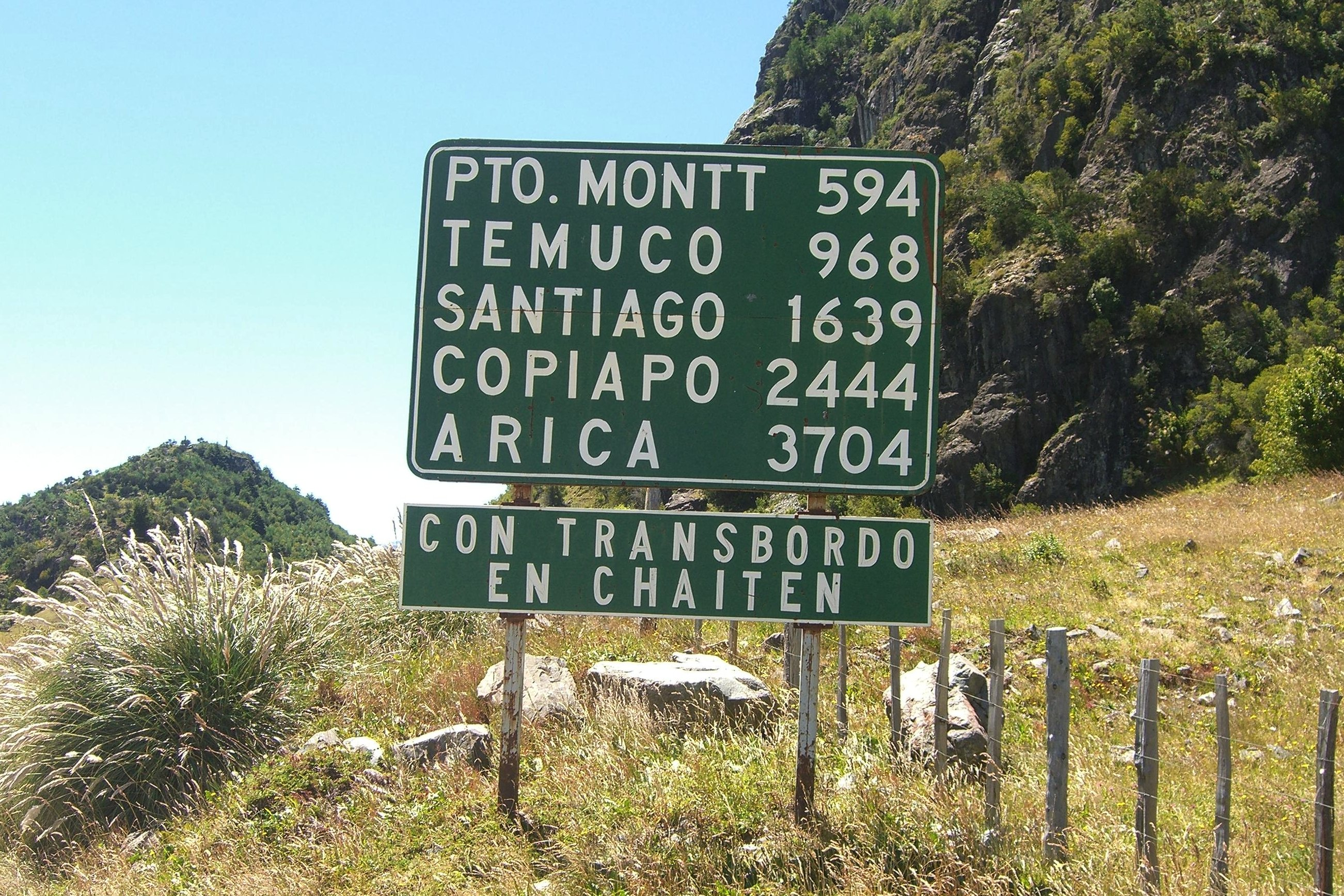
Distance sign in Chile

A mileage sign, sometimes also called a route confirmation sign or simply a distance sign in certain contexts, is a type of road sign along highways that displays the distance from the current point on a highway to a certain city, destination, or a junction to another highway. Their purpose is to inform drivers of the distance to a destination they are traveling to, as well as other destinations reachable along the route. The destinations listed can range from a short distance away, such as a few miles or kilometers, to long distances away, from several hundred or even thousands of miles or kilometers away.

Unlike most road signs, mileage signs remain roughly consistent throughout the world, with the only differences being background colors on signs and the units of measurement used. In countries whose languages are written from right-to-left, such as Arabic or Hebrew, distances instead appear on the left and destinations on the right.

== Functionality ==
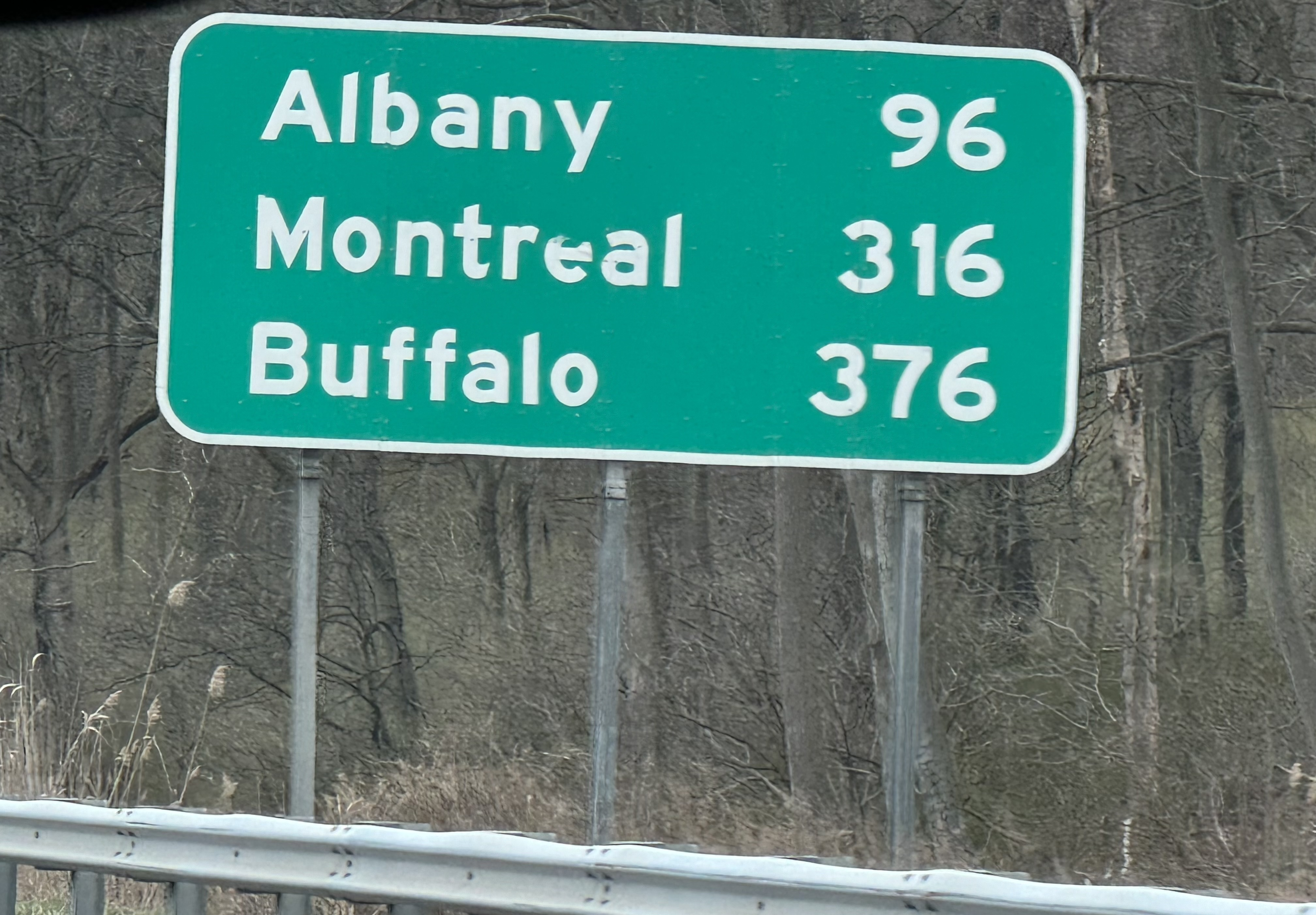
Mileage sign for Albany, Montreal, and Buffalo on NY Thruway/I-87 northbound in Woodbury, New York

Generally, the distance that is calculated for these signs is not the distance to the border or city limits, but rather to the estimated center of a city. They also are not calculated by a straight-line from the sign to the city, but instead the distance along the ideally-quickest route to take, taking into account all the turns and curves drivers will take, and the distance may not be perfect. For example, U.S. Route 50, a cross-country route, has a sign in Sacramento, California, stating that Ocean City, Maryland, its eastern endpoint, was 3,037 miles (4,888 km) away, whereas a sign in Ocean City once said that Sacramento was 3,073 miles (4,946 km) away.

In some countries, route numbers may also be displayed above or alongside the listed destinations, thereby taking on the additional role of reassurance markers.

The frequency of mileage signs do differ between rural/countryside areas, cities, and the suburbs. They are much more common in the countryside compared to cities because most drivers simply pass through these regions on a major highway to get to their destination, letting them know how far they are from the nearest major town, village, or city. In contrast, highways in or near urban cities will list locations or junctions with other highways as control cities instead, which differ from mileage signs because they are posted only at gores or exits (or upcoming exits), and do not give the distance to them. Mileage signs may be seen exiting a city, but typically are not used inside or entering a control city.

== Europe ==
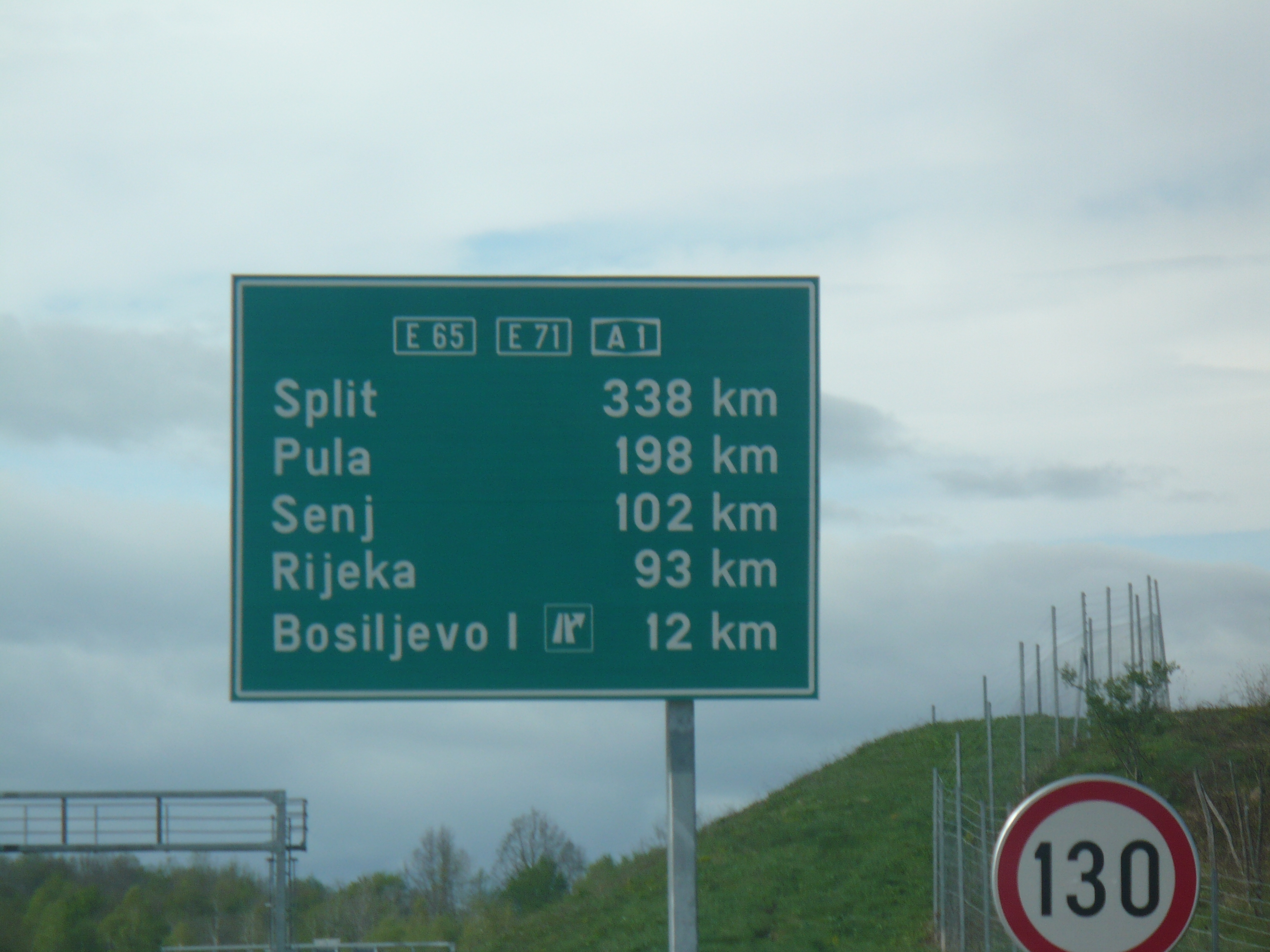
Route confirmation sign in Croatia, displaying a named interchange with symbol

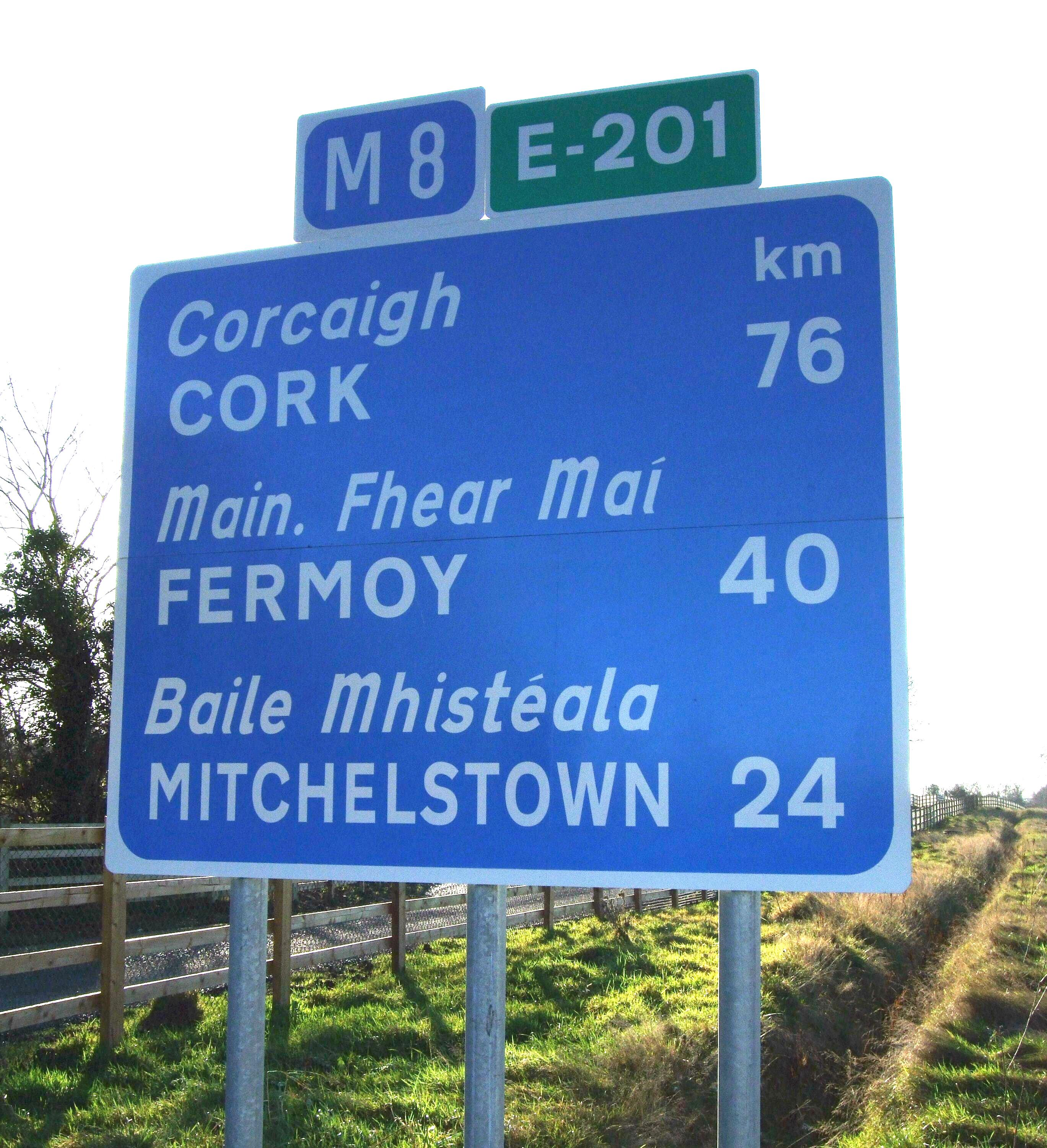
Route numbers displayed on top of a route confirmation sign in Ireland

Route numbers, including those denoting E-roads, are typically shown on route confirmation signs. The order of destinations listed by distance varies across the continent, with some countries (such as the United Kingdom, Spain and Russia) opting to display the nearest destination first, and other countries (such as Sweden, Germany and Ireland) displaying the furthest destination first. Distances to upcoming interchanges are shown in some countries, which may be named and/or feature an exit symbol or number.

=== Ireland ===
Route confirmation signs are referred to officially as route confirmatory signs. This is the only sign type in Ireland where E-road numbers are displayed. Where a sign features only one destination, the route number is included within the same sign. When there are two or more destinations, the route numbers are instead added separately above the sign.

Destinations that cannot be reached solely by the currently travelled route are shown in brackets. They are then ordered by the distance to reach the junction which a driver must take to reach said destination, as opposed to the overall distance to the destination.

=== United Kingdom ===
Distances are displayed in miles, the only country in Europe to do so. Destinations that cannot be reached solely by the currently travelled route may be shown at the bottom of the sign, with the route number in question shown in brackets above. Regional destinations (for example, "The NORTH WEST") may be shown.

== North America ==
=== United States ===
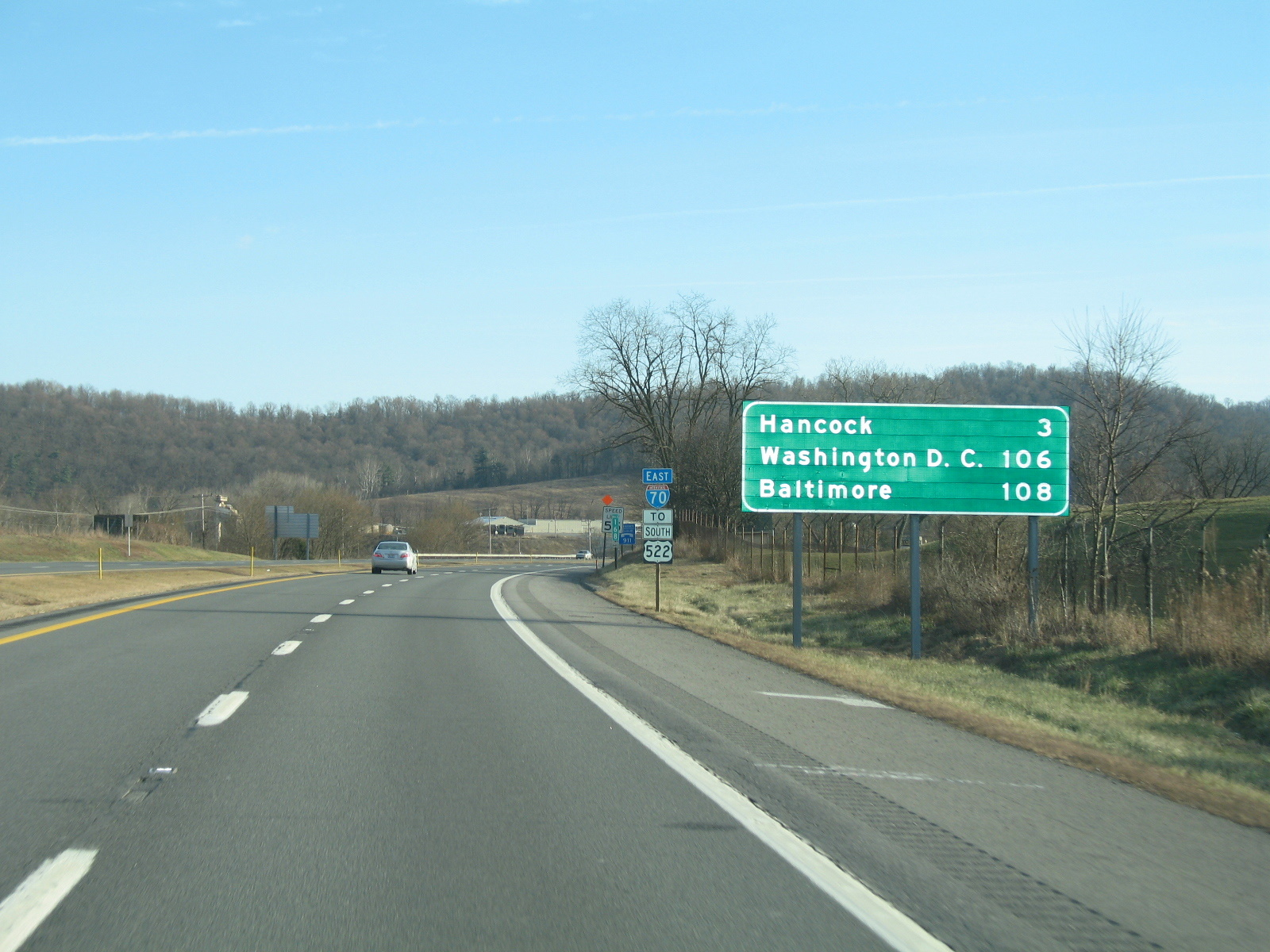
A mileage sign, as well as reassurance markers and mile post in the background, on the I-70 in Pennsylvania

Destinations on mileage signs are displayed from nearest at the top to furthest. Route numbers are not shown, instead being displayed on reassurance markers, which may or may not be located near to the mileage sign itself. The distance to a major junction or exit may also be displayed on a mileage sign.
