= Local roads in Ireland =

Class of road in Ireland

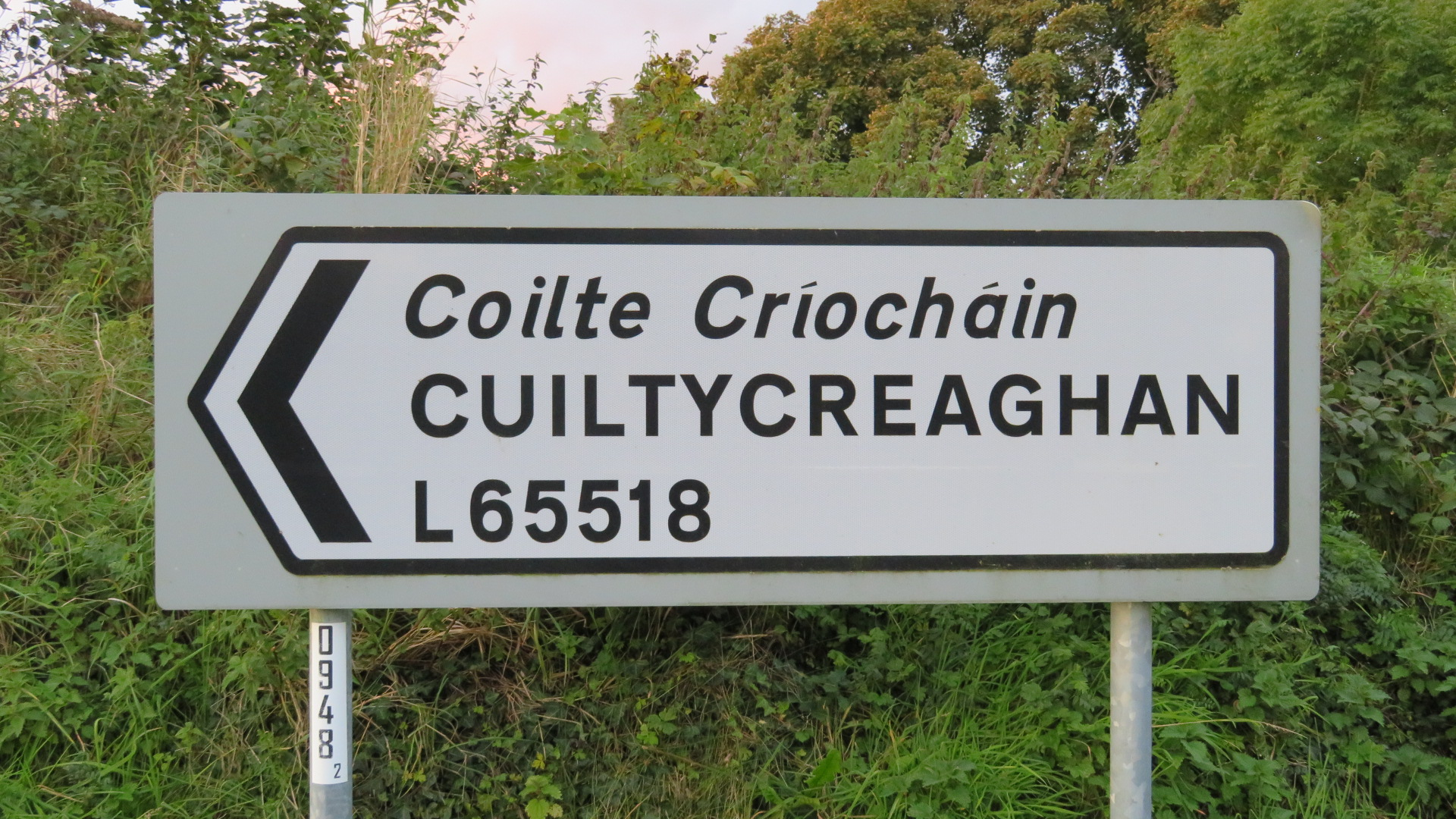
Sign for local road L65518 at junction with N60 road at Keebagh, County Mayo.

A local road (Irish: bóthar áitiúil) in Ireland is a public road not classified as a national primary road, national secondary road, or regional road but nevertheless forming a link in the national network of roads. Local roads are numbered with four- or five-digit route numbers, prefixed by "L" (for example, L3005 or L97476).

== History ==
Until 1977, roads in Ireland were designated with one of two prefixes: "T" for trunk roads and "L" for link roads. Older signs showing the former trunk and link road designations may still be seen in some locations. The L- prefix for "link road" on these signs does not stand for "local road".

The Local Government (Roads and Motorways) Act, 1974 authorised the designation of roads as national roads: in 1977, 25 national primary roads (N1–N25) and 33 national secondary roads (N51–N83) were initially designated under Statutory Instrument S.I. No. 164/1977.

Many of the remaining classified roads became regional roads (formally authorised under the Roads Act 1993, route numbers having been present on road signs on a non-statutory basis for some years previously) and their routes were designated under a Statutory Instrument in 1994.

All other public roads, except motorways, became local roads under the 1993 Act which states that "a public road, other than a national road or a regional road, shall be a local road".

Local roads vary greatly in quality, from wide urban streets to very narrow, rural lanes, known as boreens in Ireland. There are three types of local roads: local primary (local roads wider than four metres), local secondary (local roads narrower than four metres) and local tertiary (cul-de-sacs and other minor roads). Up until 7 February 2025, local roads were subject to a general speed limit of 80 kilometres per hour (km/h) or 50 km/h in built-up areas. A revised default speed limit of 60 km/h applies from that date, with a 30 km/h limit applying in built-up urban areas from later in 2025 under the Road Traffic Act 2024, following recommendations from a review of speed limits carried out by the Department of Transport in 2023.

== Local road numbering ==
The Roads Act 1993 gives local authorities the duty to "assign a number or other identifying mark to each local road in respect of which it has a responsibility". Local road numbers have been used for administrative purposes since the Act came into effect, but local road numbers did not generally appear on directional signposts until the late 2000s. Most road maps do not show local road numbers, although some are marked on OpenStreetMap.

Local roads are classified by the road authority for the area as local primary, local secondary or local tertiary roads. The local primary roads are numbered from L1000 – L4999. Local secondary roads are numbered from L5000 – L8999. Local tertiary roads are numbered from L10001 – L89999, with the first four digits representing the local primary or secondary road to which it is connected. Local tertiary roads which are unrelated to a local primary or secondary road are numbered from L90000 upwards. Local roads are divided into segments of two to three kilometres maximum. For this reason, they serve a limited function as the applicable L road number generally ends at junctions with other local roads. The numbering systems are not widely known to the public, however, they must be made available to the public upon request in accordance with section 10 of the Roads Act 1993.

Unlike national and regional roads in Ireland, local road numbers are unique within each administrative county but are not unique nationwide. For example, there is an L1001 in Kilcroney, Bray, another in Inch, County Wexford, another L1001 in County Limerick and a fourth in County Longford. There are various unrelated roads numbered L1002 across County Kildare, County Meath, and County Wexford.

== See also ==
- Roads in Ireland
- Roads in Northern Ireland
- Motorways in the Republic of Ireland
- History of roads in Ireland
- Trunk roads in Ireland
- Transport in Ireland
