= List of toll roads in the Republic of Ireland =

- Irish toll road sign symbol

System information
- Length: 173 km (107 mi)

The following is a list of toll roads in the Republic of Ireland. Ireland has 173 kilometres (107 mi) of toll roads, bridges and tunnels.

== Toll roads ==
Road name	Total road length (km)	Toll road length (km)	Toll begins	Toll ends	Cash tolls (car)
M1 Dublin-Belfast	87	15	Junction 7 (Julianstown)	Junction 10 (Drogheda North)	€2.30
M3 Dublin-Kells	51	11	Junction 5 (Dunboyne)	Junction 6 (Dunshaughlin)	€1.50
M3 Dublin-Kells	51	11	Junction 9 (Navan North)	Junction 10 (Kells)	€1.50
M4 Lucan-Kinnegad	62	28.5	Junction 8 (Kilcock)	Junction 10 (Kinnegad)	€3.00
M6 Kinnegad-Galway	151	26.5	Junction 15 (Ballinasloe West)	Junction 16 (Loughrea)	€2.00
M7 Dublin-Limerick	166.5	27	Junction 18 (Portlaoise West)	Junction 21 (Borris-in-Ossory/Junction 3 M8)	€2.00
M7/M8 Motorway	166.5 (M7) / 153 (M8)	23	Junction 3 (M8 - Rathdowney)	Junction 18 (M7 - Portlaoise West)	€2.00
M8 Dublin-Cork	153	13	Junction 15 (Fermoy South)	Junction 17 (Watergrasshill)	€2.00
M50 Dublin	45	4	Junction 6 (N3 Blanchardstown)	Junction 7 (N4 Lucan)	€3.20

== Toll bridges ==
Road name	Bridge name	Total road length	Toll road length	Bridge length	Toll begins	Toll ends	Cash tolls (car)
N25 Cork-Rosslare	River Suir Bridge	196 km	3 km	465m	Junction for the M9/N24	Junction for R710	€2.00
R131 Dublin	East-Link Bridge	2 km	150m	150m	North Wall	Ringsend	€1.90

== Tunnels ==
Road name	Tunnel name	Total road length (km)	Toll road length (km)	Tunnel length	Toll begins	Toll ends	Cash tolls (car)
N18 Limerick-Galway	Limerick Tunnel	88	6	675m	Junction 2	Junction 4	€2.00
M50 Dublin	Dublin Port Tunnel	45	5.7	4.5 km	Dublin Port	M1 motorway	Southbound – €12 between 6am & 10am Monday-Friday, €3.50 at all other times. Northbound – €12 between 4pm & 7pm Monday-Friday, €3.50 at all other times. Goods vehicles with weight exceeding 3,500 kilograms are exempt.

== See also ==
- eToll
- eFlow
- Roads in Ireland
- Motorways in the Republic of Ireland
- History of roads in Ireland
- National Development Plan
- Transport 21
