= Roads in Ireland =

The motorway and primary road network of Ireland, as of 2025

The island of Ireland, comprising Northern Ireland and the Republic of Ireland, has an extensive network of tens of thousands of kilometres of public roads, usually surfaced. These roads have been developed and modernised over centuries, from trackways suitable only for walkers and horses, to surfaced roads including modern motorways. Driving is on the left-hand side of the road. The major routes were established before Irish independence and consequently take little cognisance of the border other than a change of identification number and street furniture. Northern Ireland has had motorways since 1962, and has a well-developed network of primary, secondary and local routes. The Republic started work on its motorway network in the early 1980s; and historically, the road network there was once somewhat less well developed. However, the Celtic Tiger economic boom and an influx of European Union structural funding, saw national roads and regional roads in the Republic come up to international standard quite quickly. In the mid-1990s, for example, the Republic went from having only a few short sections of motorway to a network of motorways, dual carriageways and other improvements on most major routes as part of a National Development Plan. Road construction in Northern Ireland now tends to proceed at a slower pace than in the Republic, although a number of important bypasses and upgrades to dual carriageway have recently been completed or are about to begin.

Roads in Northern Ireland are classified as either Highways, motorways (shown by the letter "M" followed by a route number, e.g. M1), A-roads (shown by the letter "A" followed by a route number, e.g. A6), B-roads (shown by the letter "B" followed by a route number, e.g. B135) and other roads. There are two types of A-roads: primary and non-primary.

Roads in the Republic are classified as motorways (shown by the letter "M" followed by a route number, e.g. M7), national roads (shown by the letter "N" followed by a route number, e.g. N25), regional roads (shown by the letter "R" followed by a route number, e.g. R611) and local roads (shown by the letter "L" followed by a route number, e.g. L4202). There are two types of national roads: national primary routes and national secondary routes.

Road signs in Northern Ireland follow the same design rules as the rest of the United Kingdom. Distance signposts in Northern Ireland show distances in miles, while all signposts placed in the Republic since the late 1970s use kilometres. The Republic's road signs are generally bilingual, using both official languages, Irish and English. However, signs in the Gaeltacht (Irish speaking areas) use only Irish. The Irish language names are written in italic script, the English in capitals. Signs in Northern Ireland are in English only. Warning signs in the Republic have a yellow background and are diamond-shaped, those in Northern Ireland are triangle-shaped and have a white background with a red border.

Speed limits in Northern Ireland are specified in miles per hour. Those in the Republic use kilometres per hour (km/h), a change introduced on 20 January 2005. This involved the provision of 58,000 new metric speed limit signs, replacing and supplementing 35,000 imperial signs.

== History ==
There have been routes and trackways in Ireland connecting settlements and facilitating trade since ancient times. Ireland was never part of the Roman Empire and, therefore, Roman roads were not built in Ireland. However, an Iron Age road with a stone surface has been excavated in Munster, and togher (Irish: tóchar) roads, a type of causeway built through bogs, were found in many areas of the country.

According to an entry in the Annals of the Four Masters for AD 123, there were five principal highways (Irish: slighe) leading to Tara in Early Medieval Ireland.

Early medieval law-tracts set out five types of road including the highway (Irish: slighe), the '[regional] main road' (Irish: ród or Irish: rout), the 'connecting road' (Irish: lámraite), the 'side road' (Irish: tógraite) which could be tolled, and the 'cow road' (Irish: bóthar). Bóthar is the most common term for 'road' in modern Irish: its diminutive form, bóithrín, (or boreen in English) is used as a term for very narrow, rural roads.

The development of roads in Ireland seemed to have stagnated until the eighteenth- and early nineteenth-centuries. However, in the 18th century, a network of turnpike roads (charging tolls) was built: "a turnpike was a primitive form of turnstile – a gate across the road, opened on payment of a toll. The average length of a turnpike road was 30 miles". Routes to and from Dublin were developed initially and the network spread throughout the country. Turnpikes operated between 1729 and 1858 when the extensive railway network made them increasingly unpopular.

Specialist routes to facilitate the butter trade, which centred on Cork, were built in Munster. The first butter road was commissioned in 1748 and was built by John Murphy of Castleisland in County Kerry. In other areas, notably in County Wicklow, military roads were built to help secure British military control over remote areas. The Military Road through County Wicklow was begun in 1800 and completed in 1809. The R115 is part of the Military Road for its entire length.

Railways became the dominant form of land transport from the mid-19th century. This situation persisted until the first half of the 20th century when motorised road transport (cars, buses and trucks) gradually began to take over from railways as the most important form of land transport.

Pre-independence legislation laid the foundation for the regulation of the modern system of public roads in Ireland. The Act gave the Minister for Local Government the power to classify roads: Trunk Road Funds were used to enable local councils to improve major roads and road surfacing was gradually undertaken throughout the 1920s, 1930s and beyond.

By the 1950s an established system of road classification and numbering with trunk roads and link roads had long been developed. The present system of road classification and numbering began in 1977 when twenty-five national primary roads and thirty-three national secondary roads were designated.

Regional roads were first formally designated in 1994, although regional road route-numbers began appearing on signposts in the 1980s. The Roads Act 1993 also classified all public roads which are not national or regional roads as local roads.

== Roads in the Republic of Ireland ==
The Republic has an extensive network of public roads connecting all parts of the country. As of May 2018 the lengths of each road type, and overall length of the network, are as follows.

Length of road network in the Republic of Ireland by road classification
Road type	Length (km)	Length (mi)
National roads (including motorways)	5,413	3,363
National primary roads	2,717	1,688
National secondary roads	2,696	1,675
Regional roads	13,124	8,155
Local roads	81,293	50,513
Local primary roads	23,789	14,782
Local secondary roads	33,366	20,733
Local tertiary roads	24,138	14,999
Total	99,830	62,031

The Republic's major road network is focused on Dublin. Motorways were extended from Dublin to other major cities as part of the Transport 21 programme which aimed to have a world-class motorway network in place by the end of 2010. At that time, Ireland's main cities (Cork, Limerick, Galway, Waterford and Belfast) excluding Derry were connected to Dublin with motorways or with near-motorway standard roads. Dublin was the focus of some other major projects, such as the East-Link and West-Link toll-bridges, as well as the Dublin Port Tunnel. Major by-pass projects were also built around other cities and towns. The Jack Lynch Tunnel under the River Lee in Cork was a major project outside Dublin, and a fourth crossing at Limerick under the River Shannon (known as the Limerick Tunnel) opened in 2010.

The different classes of roads in Ireland are allocated blocks of numbers so that no number is used more than once save in the case of local primary roads. Not all road numbers are currently in use.

=== Motorways ===
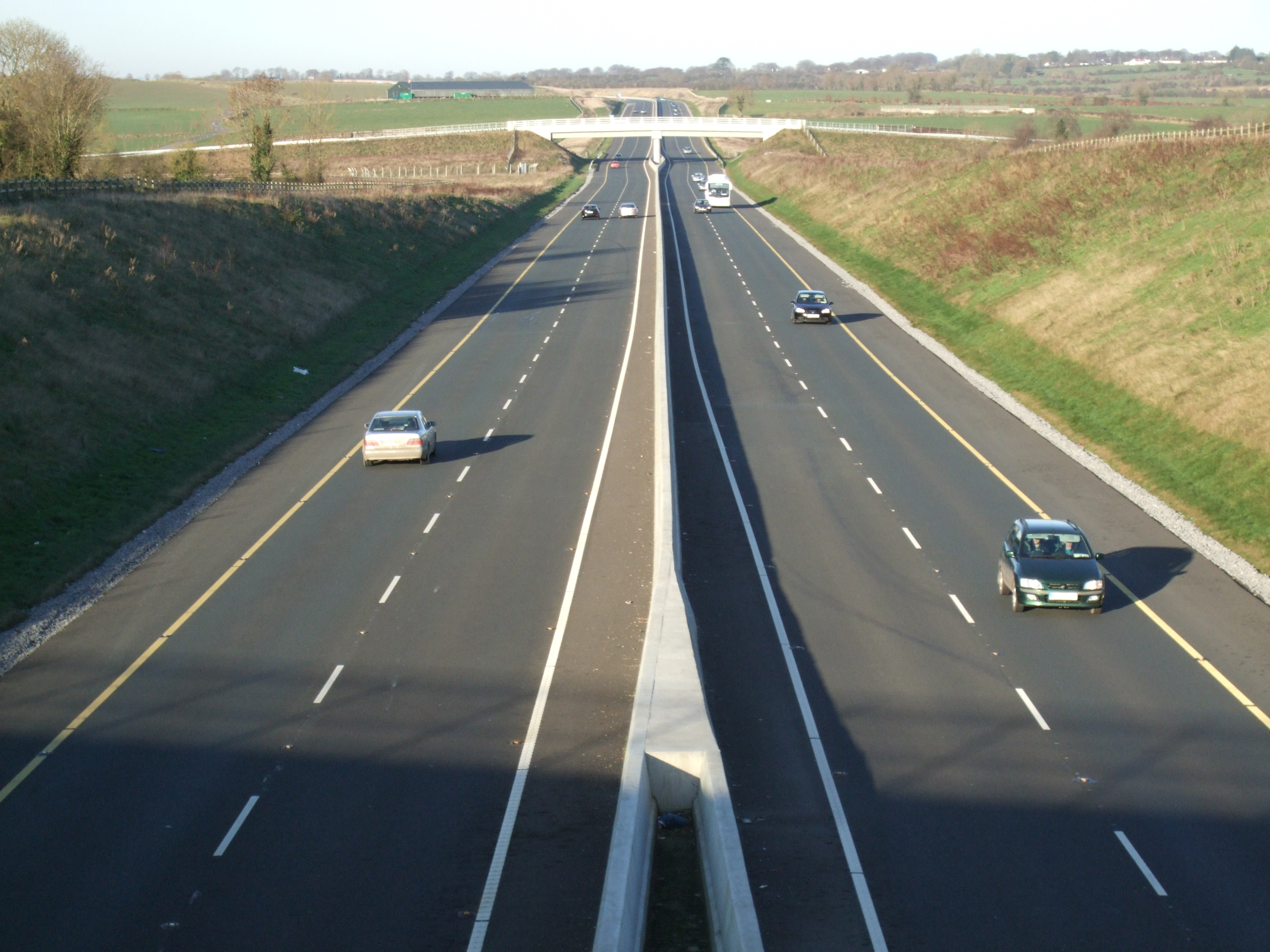
Stretch of M8 motorway in County Tipperary

In the Republic of Ireland, a motorway forms part of a national primary route, but is indicated by the prefix "M" instead of "N". Motorways are the highest standard roads and certain drivers and vehicles are prohibited from using them. The motorway network has been expanded extensively since the 1990s, through construction of new motorways and redesignation of existing motorway-standard dual-carriageway sections of national primary routes.

The first motorway section in the state was the M7 Naas by-pass, which opened in 1983. At the end of 2004 there were 192 km (119 mi) of motorway in the Republic and 286 km (178 mi) of dual-carriageway. This was extended, by the end of 2005, to 247 km (153 mi) of motorway and 308 km (191 mi) of dual-carriageway, including 2+1 roads. By the end of December 2009 there were 667 km (414 mi) of motorway in Ireland, with 385 kilometres (239 mi) under construction at the time.

In June 2007, it was announced that around 800 kilometres (500 mi) of 'new' motorway would be created; however, much of this resulted from the re-classification of most of the country's high-quality dual carriageways to motorway regulations rather than the construction of purpose-built motorways. This affected most of the major inter-urban routes between Dublin and various towns and cities and some of the Atlantic Corridor along the Western seaboard.

By 2015, TII planned that there would be approximately 1,090 km (677 mi) of motorway in Ireland, comprising the M50 (45.55 km (28 mi)), M20 (90 km (56 mi) approx), M18 (70 km (43 mi) approx), M17 (25.5 km (16 mi)), M11 (62 km (39 mi)), M9 (116.5 km (72 mi)), M8 (147 km (91 mi)), M7 (185 km (115 mi)), M6 (144 km (89 mi)), M4 (62 km (39 mi)), M3 (57 km (35 mi)), M2 (13 km (8 mi)), and M1 (89 km (55 mi)). However the Irish financial crisis brought this target into question.

=== National primary roads ===
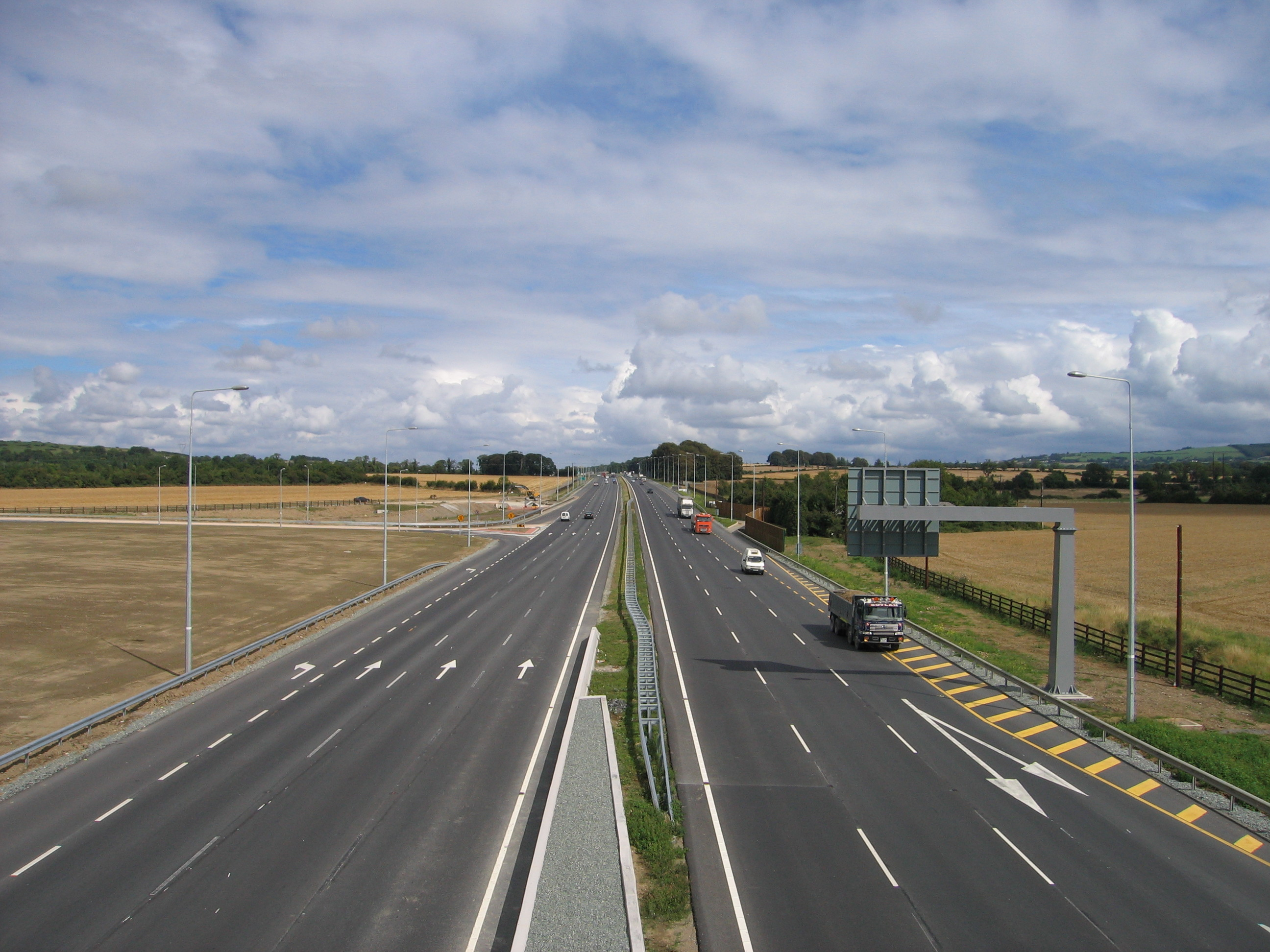
Naas Road (N7), non-motorway high-grade dual carriageway

National primary routes form the main cross country roads in Ireland and include all motorways. This category of road is numbered from 1–50 with the prefix "N" (or "M" for motorway sections). The routes numbered N1-N11 radiate anti-clockwise from Dublin, with those in the range N12-N26 being cross-country roads and N27-N33 being newer short link roads. The N40 is the Cork Ring Road and the N50 is the Dublin Ring Road. National secondary roads are numbered under the same scheme with higher numbers.

Northern Ireland route sections (which are classified separately according to NI schemes) are in some cases included in a theoretical complete cross-border route – for example the N3 route, which re-enters the Republic.

=== National secondary roads ===
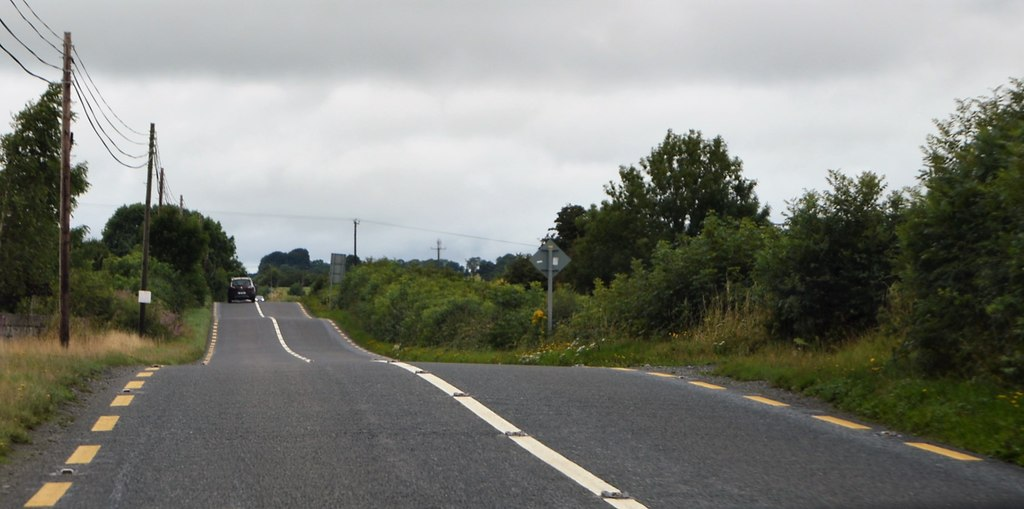
National secondary roads are often lower-grade than national primary roads.

National secondary roads fill in the rest of the main cross country routes in Ireland. They connect large towns which are not served by national primary routes, and some routes (such as N59) follow long coastal route connecting many towns. They are indicated with a "N" prefix followed by a number from 51 to 99 (N87 is currently the highest).

As of 2018, there are 2,696 km (1,675 mi) of national secondary roads in Ireland, making up slightly less than 50% of the entire national route (national primary and national secondary) network. National secondary routes are generally more poorly maintained than primary routes (although their quality can vary widely), but often carry more traffic than regional roads. Almost the entire network of national secondary roads is single carriageway, although there are some short sections of dual carriageway on the Tallaght bypass section of the N81, on the N52 at Dundalk, on the N85 at Ennis, on the N62 at Athlone and on the N71 between Cork and Bandon.

Typically, national secondary roads are of a similar standard or higher than regional roads although some are of lower quality than the better sections of regional roads. Many of them have been resurfaced with higher quality pavements in recent years with relatively smooth surfaces and good road markings and signposting. However, road widths and alignments are often inadequate, with many narrow and winding sections.

National secondary roads generally do not bypass towns on their routes although there are a number of exceptions: the N52 bypasses Nenagh, Mullingar and the centre of Dundalk (as a relief road) with a further N52 bypass of Tullamore planned, the N55 (along with the N3) bypasses Cavan, the N56 forms part of the Donegal bypass, the N61 and the N63 bypass Roscommon, the N71 bypasses Halfway and Skibbereen, the N74 bypasses Cashel, the N76 bypasses Callan, the N77 forms the northern part of the Kilkenny ring road, the N80 bypasses Carlow and the N85 bypasses Ennis. When the Fermoy (Moorepark) to Kilbehenny section of the M8 was completed, the former N8 bypass of Mitchelstown was re-classified as the N73.

=== Alternative national roads ===
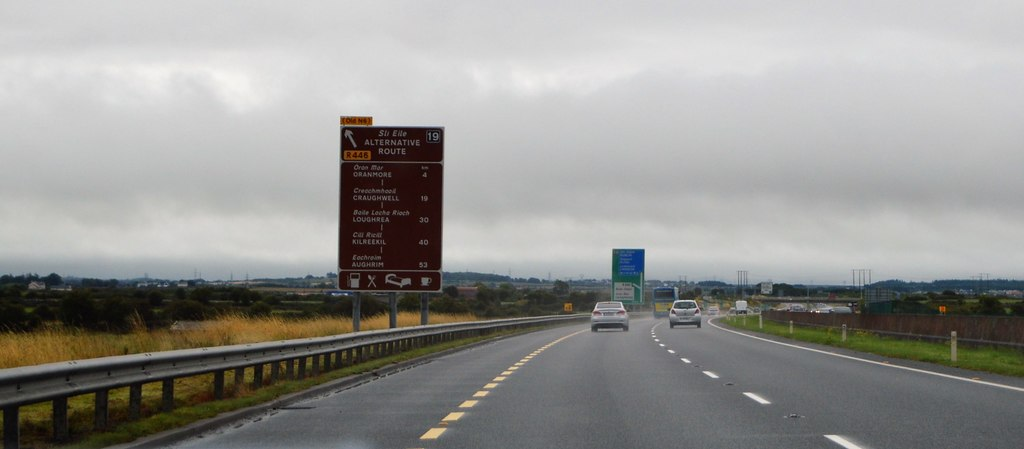
An alternative route signposted on the N6 near Oranmore, shortly before the commencement of the M6 motorway

Alternative national roads are regional roads which provide an alternative route to a national route. A large amount of national primary routes have been replaced by motorways, which certain drivers and vehicles are prohibited from using. These regional roads provide an alternative route to the motorway for these drivers. They are usually the former national road which was downgraded following the opening of the motorway.

In 2010 new signage was introduced for alternative routes. They are identical to regional road signage, except that their route numbers are shown in black on a yellow background, instead of black on a white background as with other regional roads. This new signage has been installed on most roads, being included when signage was replaced. Roads where the new signage has been installed include the R132 in Swords (alternative to M1), the R147 in Dunshaughlin (alternative to M3), the entire length of the R448 (alternative to M9), the R712 in Paulstown (alternative to N10) and the R772 from Rathnew to Arklow (alternative to M11).

=== Regional roads ===
Regional roads fill in the rest of the main roads in Ireland. They connect many small towns to each other and to the national road network. As of 2018, there are 13,124 kilometres (8,200 mi) of regional roads. Regional roads are numbered with three digit route numbers, prefixed by "R" (e.g. R105). Route numbers range from R1xx in the north-east to R7xx in the south-east of the country, with newer short urban roads numbered R8xx and R9xx. They are signposted in black with a white background. Some of the more important regional roads such as the R136 Outer Orbital, Dublin and the R710 Waterford Outer Ring Road are dual-carriageway in whole or part. Most regional roads are however single carriageway roads, and many are rather narrow country roads.

Regional roads are subject to a general speed limit of 80 km/h (50 mph) or 50 km/h (31 mph) in built-up areas.

While funding for national primary roads is administered centrally by Transport Infrastructure Ireland (TII), regional and local roads are less well funded (although funding has increased in the 2000s). Local councils are responsible for these roads, as opposed to TII.

=== Local roads ===
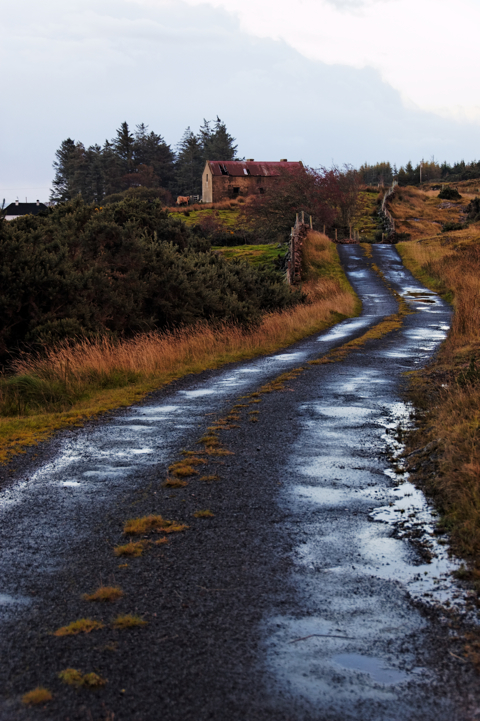
Local roads, such as this boreen in County Mayo, were subject to a speed limit of 80 km/h (50 mph) until 2025.

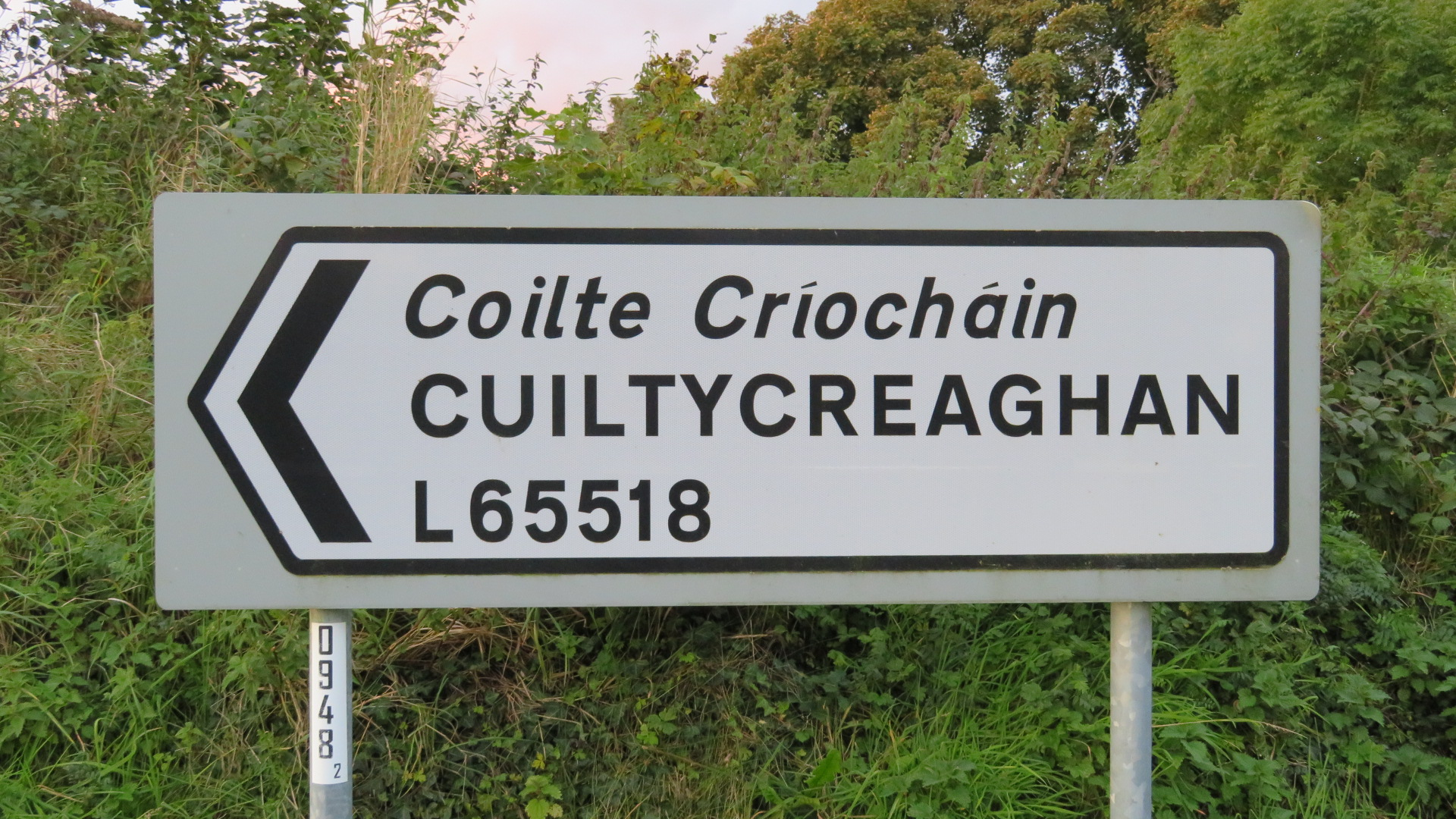
Sign for local road L65518 at junction with N60 road at Keebagh, County Mayo.

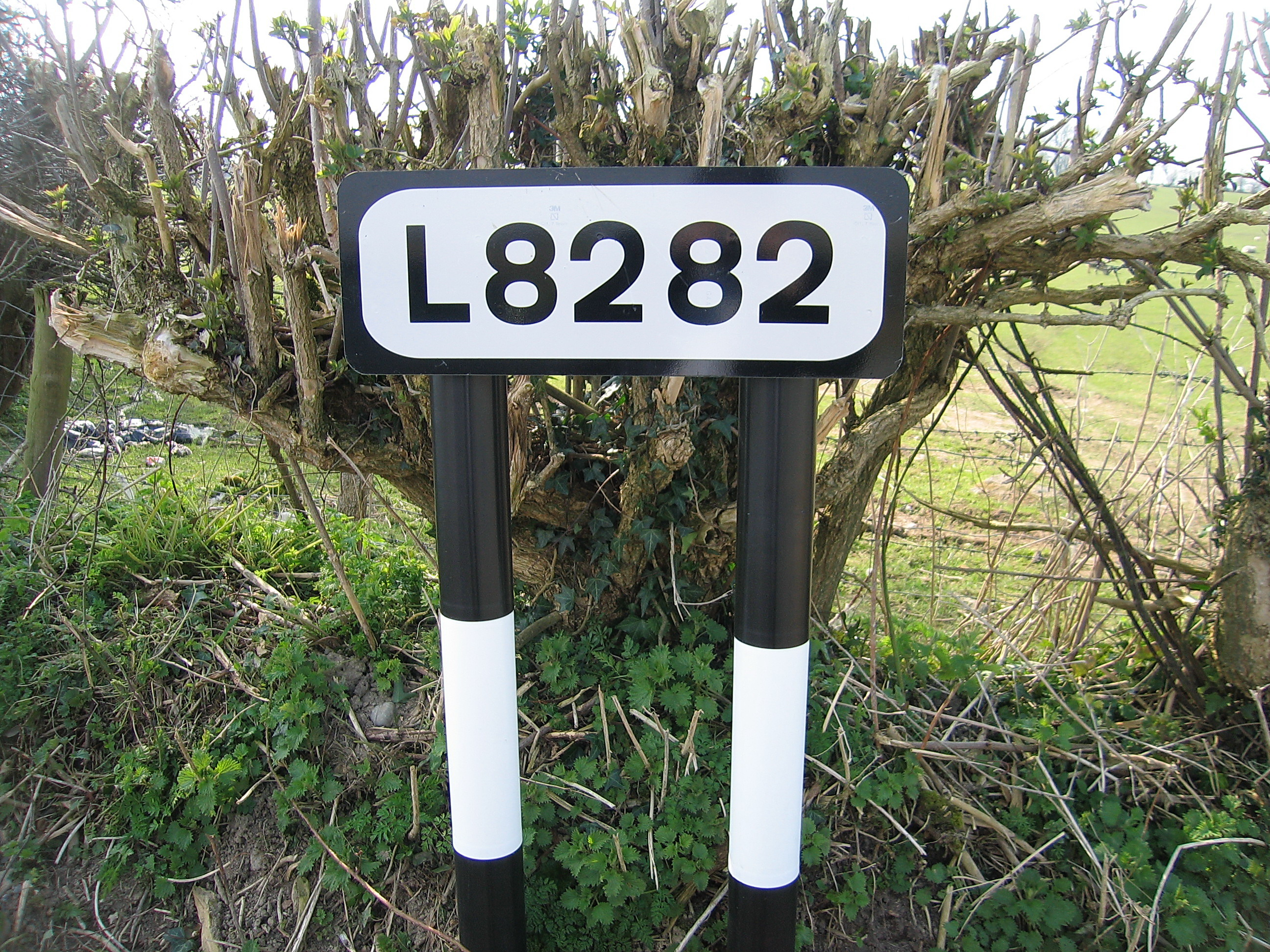
Local road route marker at the junction of the L8282 with R747 regional road at Lackareagh, County Wicklow.

All public roads which are not motorways, national roads or regional roads are local roads. Local roads vary greatly in quality, from wide urban streets to very narrow, rural lanes, known as boreens in Ireland. There are three types of local road: local primary (local roads wider than 4 metres (13 ft)), local secondary (local roads narrower than 4 metres (13 ft)) and local tertiary (cul-de-sacs and other minor roads).

Local roads are subject to a general speed limit of 60 km/h (37 mph) (formerly 80 km/h (50 mph) until February 2025) or 30 km/h (19 mph) in built-up areas. While this is the maximum speed allowed, drivers must adhere to the Road Traffic Act and drive with due care and attention and with regard to the road conditions.

Local roads are not generally referred to by number, but are registered with a four- or five-digit "L" number. Local primary roads are numbered from L1000 to L4999, local secondary roads are numbered from L5000 to L8999 and local tertiary roads are numbered from L10001 to L89999 with the first 4 digits representing the local primary or secondary road it starts off from. Local tertiary roads which are unrelated to a local primary or secondary road are given numbers from L90000 up. It used to be rare to see these numbers on signposts (and these numbers do not appear on Ordnance Survey maps), but in 2006 the Department of the Environment, Heritage and Local Government began a programme of new signage for regional roads that incorporates local road numbers on directional signage.

=== Old system ===
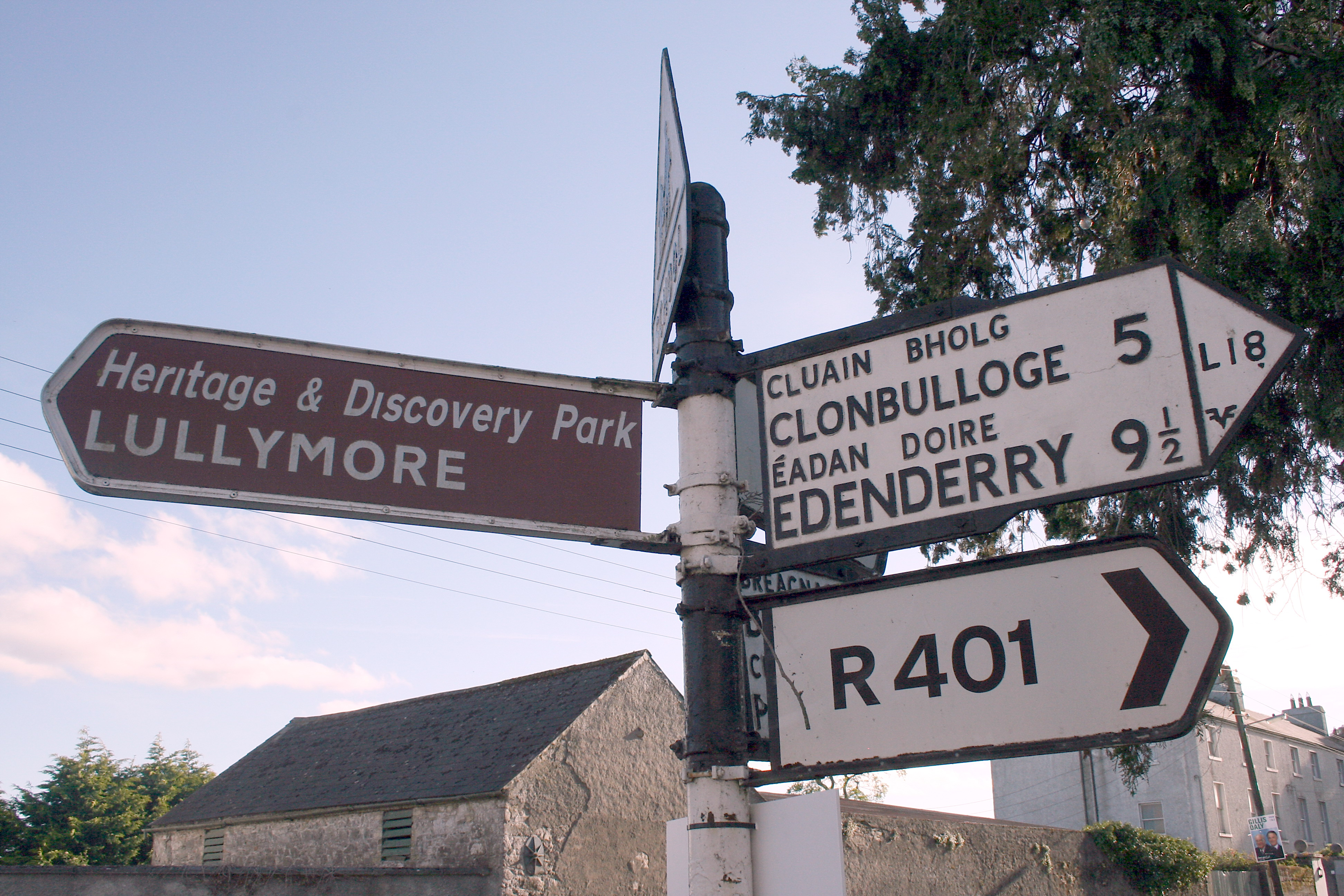
Old style fingerpost with old 'link road' number on it, and the current route designation on the sign beneath it

The Republic of Ireland had a different road numbering system prior to the introduction of the National Route numbering system.

Major roads were marked with "T" for trunk road, less important roads were marked with "L" for link road.

The first nine trunk roads (T1, T2, T3, T4, T4a, T5, T6, T7, T8) radiated out from Dublin (with the T8 branching off the T7 at Enniscorthy) and followed an anti-clockwise pattern. This pattern was similar to the existing anti-clockwise pattern which the routes radiating out of Dublin follow.

Unlike the present system, where each road (whether N- or R-) has a unique number, under the trunk/link system, the L-roads were numbered separately beginning with L1. These L classifications for link roads are not related to those for local roads. Confusingly, some old road signs still show the now obsolete road numbers.

Trunk roads were broadly equivalent to the present national roads, and link roads to the present regional roads. Most of the national primary and national secondary routes had been trunk roads and generally they followed the routes of these trunk roads, albeit with a different numbering system. However, some national primary and secondary roads also incorporated link roads and unclassified roads into their routes. Furthermore, many trunk roads were downgraded to regional roads, effectively 'de-trunked'. Some newer national primary routes were built as new roads in the 1990s and therefore did not incorporate former trunk, link or unclassified roads into their routes.

== Roads in Northern Ireland ==
The main roads in Northern Ireland, which connect well with those in the Republic, are classified "M"/"A"/"B" as in Great Britain. Whereas the roads in Great Britain are numbered according to a zonal system, there is no available explanation for the allocation of road numbers in Northern Ireland, though their numbering is separate from the system in England, Scotland and Wales.

== European routes ==
The following European routes include sections in Ireland:

- E1 (Larne – Belfast – Dublin – Rosslare)
- E16 (Derry – Belfast)
- E18 (Craigavon – Belfast – Larne)
- E20 (Shannon – Limerick – Dublin)
- E30 (Cork – Waterford – Wexford – Rosslare)
- E201 (Cork – Portlaoise)

== See also ==
- Transport in Ireland
- Transport Infrastructure Ireland
- National Roads Authority
- Department of Transport
- Road signs in Ireland
- Speed limits in Ireland
- List of toll roads in the Republic of Ireland
