= Dublin Port Tunnel =

Road traffic tunnel in Dublin, Ireland

Dublin Tunnel
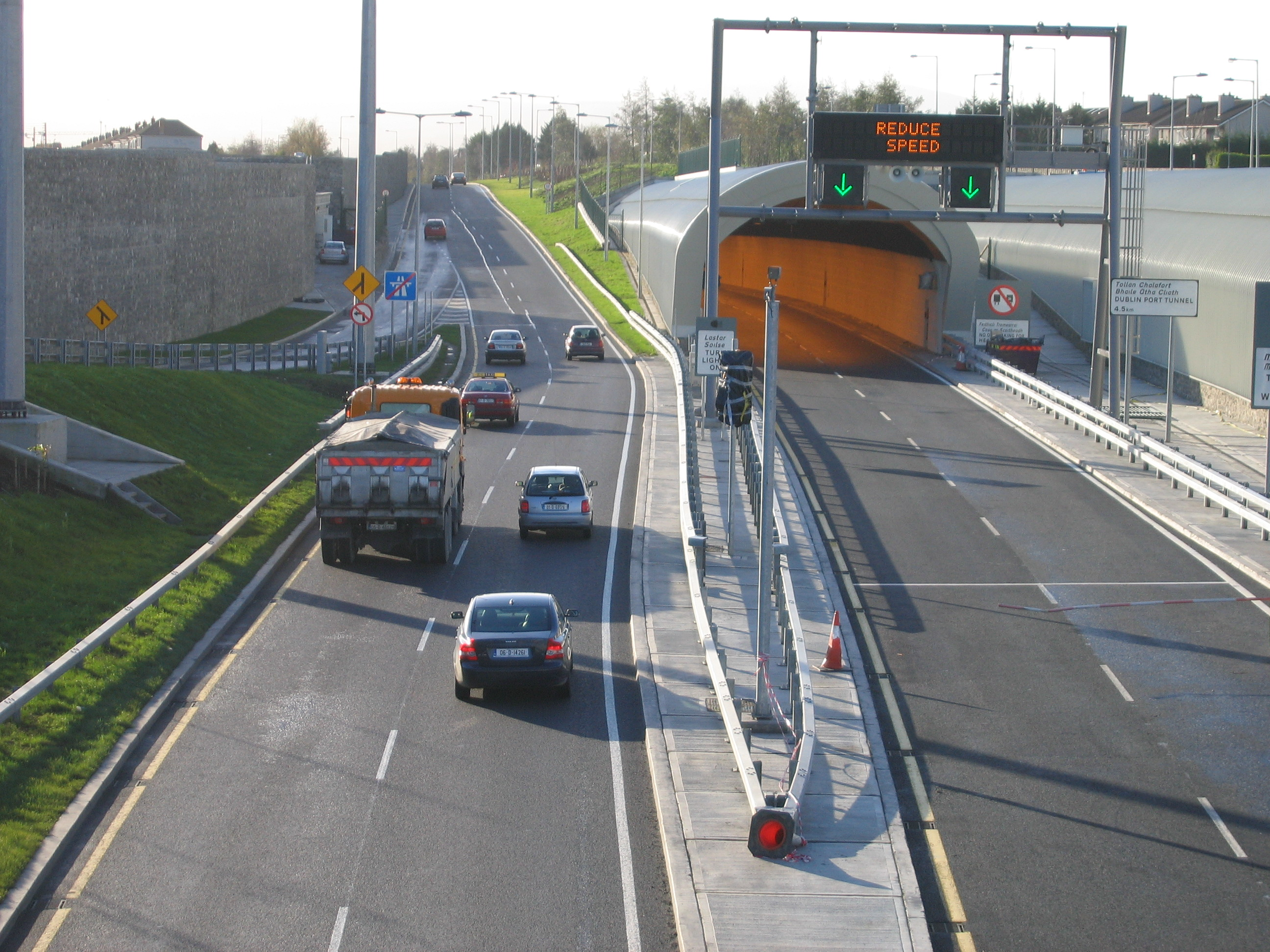
- Dublin Tunnel, southbound entrance, December 2006
- Interactive map of Dublin Tunnel

Overview
- Location: Dublin, Ireland
- Coordinates: 53.36118°N 6.23410°W
- Route: M50
- Start: Dublin Port
- End: M50 motorway (Junction 2)

Operation
- Work began: June 2001
- Opened: 20 December 2006 (HGVs only); 28 January 2007 (all traffic)
- Owner: Transport Infrastructure Ireland
- Operator: Transport Infrastructure Ireland

Technical
- Length: 4.6 kilometres (2.9 mi) (immersed tube tunnel section); 5.7 kilometres (3.5 mi) (total roadway)
- No. of lanes: 2 cells of 2 each
- Operating speed: 80 km/h (50 mph)
- Tunnel clearance: 4.8 metres (16 ft) (internal)
- Width: 11.77 metres (38.6 ft) (internal)

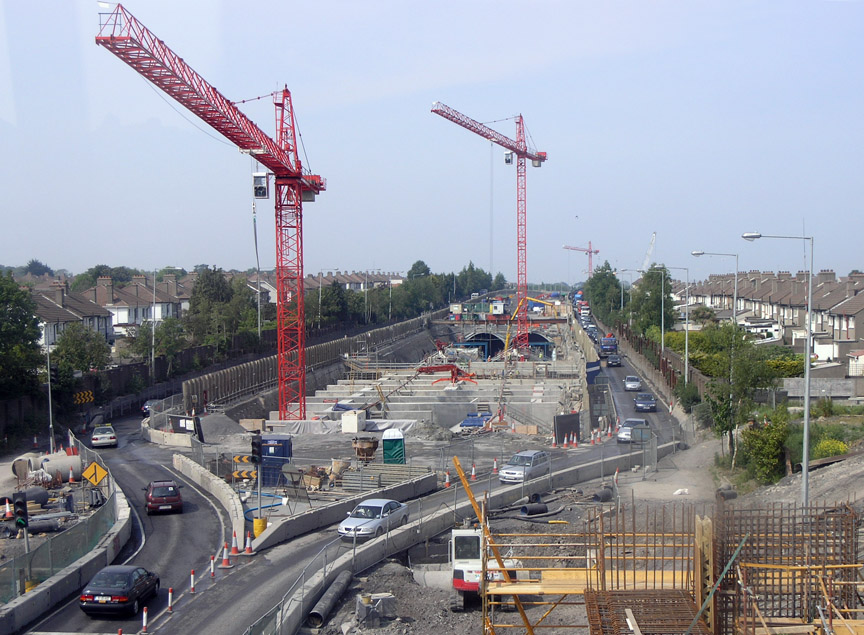
Dublin Tunnel Construction, 2004

The Dublin Tunnel (Irish: Tollán Bhaile Átha Cliath), originally and still commonly known as the Port Tunnel, is a road traffic tunnel in Dublin, Ireland, that forms part of the M50 motorway.

The twin tunnels form a two-lane dual carriageway connecting Dublin Port, which lies to the east of central Dublin, and the M50 motorway at junction 2, close to Dublin Airport. The tunnels are 4.5 km (2.8 mi) in length and total project length of 5.6 km (3.5 mi). It had a final cost of approximately €752 million.

The tunnel was officially opened on 20 December 2006; it was initially only open to HGVs. It was opened to all traffic on 28 January 2007.

== Purpose ==
Traffic congestion in central Dublin became severe at the end of the 20th century, with thousands of heavy goods vehicles (HGVs) travelling to and from Dublin port via the city centre. The tunnel relieves surface road congestion in Dublin city centre by diverting HGVs from Dublin Port directly onto the motorway network. This has positive knock-on effects for bus users, pedestrians and cyclists travelling along the city quays, including better air quality and safer travel.

To discourage commuters from using the tunnel, vehicles other than HGVs are heavily tolled at peak times. HGVs travelling north and west benefit from the expected six-minute journey time through the tunnel. A tunnel was chosen as it was decided that a surface relief road was not feasible.

Dublin Bus routes 142, 33x and 41x use the tunnel to get to the port area of the city from the northern suburbs.

Longer distance buses from Belfast, Derry and Letterkenny also use the route.

== Port tunnel project ==
The tunnel was first suggested in the 1991 after a number of transportation and engineering studies were undertaken. The plans for the project were unveiled on 4 December 1995 with public exhibitions taking place the following day at Plunkett College, Whitehall and at St Joseph's secondary school in Fairview the following week. The project was approved following a public inquiry in 1999 and was included in the Dublin City Development Plan 1999 – 2005.

The tunnel formed part of the National Development Plan and funds were provided under the plan to the National Roads Authority by the Department of Transport. The contract was managed by Dublin City Council and supervised by Brown & Root, a unit of Halliburton. The main contractor was a Japanese-British-Irish consortium Nishimatsu Mowlem Irishenco (Note: Following bankruptcy, the name and assets of this eponymous and long-standing Irish company were bought by Mowlem before construction of the tunnel began. Thereafter, Irishenco was possibly best described as an Irish-based branch of Mowlem, which was itself dissolved in 2006.) (NMI), appointed in 2000.

The tender price for the construction of the tunnel was €457 million. The final project cost was brought to €752 million by land acquisition, design, insurance, legal and other services, plus supervision by Brown & Root.

Construction commenced in June 2001 and the tunnel was originally due to open in 2005 after an elapsed time of 43 months. It eventually opened in December 2006, giving an elapsed time of 66 months.

One reason for the project extension was to allay residents' noise concerns. Under some areas such as Griffith Avenue and the Cloisters, boring was restricted to 16 hours per day. Under Annadale Crescent, it was reduced to 13 hours.

== Tunnel specifications ==
- Length: 4.5 km (2.8 mi) – total project 5.6 km (3.5 mi)
- Bores: 2
- Bore width: 11.77 m (38 ft 7.82 inches)
- Lane width (two per bore): 3.65 m (11 ft 11.70 inches)
- Shoulder width (two per bore): 1 m (3 ft 3.37 inches)
- Bore height: 4.9 m (16 ft 0.91 inches)
- Operating height: 4.65 m (15 ft 3.07 inches)
- Lowest point: -30 m (−98 ft 5.10 inches) at Marino

It is the fourth longest urban motorway tunnel in Europe after Madrid M-30, Blanka tunnel complex in Prague and Södra länken in Stockholm, Sweden. When non-urban road tunnels are included, the Dublin Port Tunnel is shorter than some other European tunnels, such as the Lærdal Tunnel (Norwegian: Lærdalstunnelen) in Norway (24.5 km), the Gotthard Road Tunnel in Switzerland (17 km), the Mont Blanc Tunnel between France and Italy (11.6 km) and the Western Scheldt Tunnel (Dutch: Westerscheldetunnel) in The Netherlands (6.6 km).

== Tunnel design ==
The tunnel was built in five sections including a pipe-jacked section under the Dublin-Belfast railway line.

=== Cut and cover ===
The "cut and cover" sections at both ends featured excavations as deep as 12 m into which horseshoe-shaped sections of reinforced concrete were cast in-situ and backfilled. The southern section, at Fairview, is 500 m long while the northern cut and cover channel from Whitehall Church to Shantalla extends over 1500 m. This work was undertaken by the Mowlem and Irishenco units of the consortium.

=== Tunnel boring ===
Both bored sections were initiated from a shaft 33 m deep and 57 m in diameter created at Collins Avenue by Mowlem in a joint venture with Intrafor of France. From here, the Tunnel boring machines (TBM), managed by Nishimatsu, were sent north through open clay and south through hard limestone. As is traditional, both machines were named after women – Meghan for 650 m of open clay and Grainne for 2,600 m of limestone.

TBM-1 "Grainne" headed south, passing under Griffith Avenue, Marino and Fairview. It was then dismantled, turned around and used to bore a second tunnel for the southbound carriageway. The machine, designed by Herrenknecht of Germany, was 156 m long, 12 m in diameter and was delivered to Dublin port in 105 parts carried by three ships, taking one week to unload. Combined, these bores resulted in the removal of 500,000 m^{3} of rock.

A similar process was followed northwards by the 60 m long TBM-2 "Meghan" boring from Collins Avenue to Whitehall Church, first creating the southbound carriageway.

The bores were completed with a breakthrough into the reception shaft on 18 November 2003 and 18 August 2004 for clay and rock, respectively. Much of the bored sections are 21–23 m below the surface, with the lowest point at Marino, towards the southern end, a point that also hosts the tunnel's drainage sump.

=== Pipe jacking ===
A particular challenge was faced near the southern portals where the tunnel passes under the Dublin to Belfast railway, a line that also carries suburban and commuter services. The railway was constructed on an elevated embankment made up of soft materials resting on alluvial deposits of sand and silt. Because the railway had to remain operational at all times, the cut-and-cover approach could not be used. Nishimatsu constructed a pipe-jacked supporting structure for the railway 3.5 m below the surface. The tunnel was then constructed in the supported space using horse-shoe sections and backfilled.

This 60 m section took 24 months to complete and resulted in the adjoining Alfie Byrne road being raised by 1.5 m. It also resulted in one incident of subsidence that closed the railway for three hours. This closure cost the contractor €300,000 in penalties – €28 per second.

=== Other works ===
A new entrance and exit for the Dublin port was constructed including a new bridge over the Tolka River that connects to the toll plaza and southern portals. A new junction and underpass facilitates traffic from the East Wall Road towards the tunnel.

Citybound traffic approaching the tunnel on the M50 (formerly the M1 at this point) can utilise two tunnel-bound lanes or two surface lanes that continue as the N1 toward Whitehall. Traffic emerging at the southern portal approaches the toll plaza outside the port.

== Tunnel operation ==
Following a tender process in 2005, the NRA selected Transroute International, part of France's Groupe Egis, to operate the tunnel for a period of five years with an optional renewal of two years. The service contract provided for operation, maintenance, safety, traffic management and toll collection. A new subsidiary, Transroute Tunnel Operations Ireland Ltd, was set up for the purpose. Tunnel operations, including tolling, employ between 50 and 60 people. The service contract was worth €15 million to Transroute over the five-year period. The tunnel is currently operated by Transport Infrastructure Ireland.

Elsewhere, Egis was also selected to provide a central system to enable interoperability between different electronic toll collection systems in Ireland.

== Tolling ==
The tunnel is tolled, with funds collected remitted to the Department of Transport. To facilitate the ban on 5-axled HGVs in Greater Dublin, there are no tolls for vehicles in excess of 3,500 kg MLW, or for vehicles capable of carrying 25 passengers or more.

The original tolling scheme saw three stages of tolling:

- 06:00–10:00 (Southbound) and 16:00–19:00 (Northbound) – €12
- 10:00–22:00 (Southbound) and 06:00–16:00 - 19:00-22:00(Northbound) – €6
- 22:00–06:00, and all day Saturday and Sunday, in both directions – €3

To alleviate congestion and due to extra capacity, these tolls have now been revised. As of 1 January 2024 the tolls are:

- 06:00–10:00 Monday-Friday (Southbound) – €12
- 16:00–19:00 Monday-Friday (Northbound) – €12
- All other times – €3.50

The toll plaza is located beside the tunnel control building at the southern portal, near Dublin Port. To date, tolls have been payable either on an ad-hoc basis by cash, credit or debit card or electronically by using a tolling tag from a provider such as eFlow. Cash payments are made either to a cashier or by dropping coins only (5c denomination and above only) into an automatic counter in certain lanes.

== BGA Fleming award ==
The project was joint winner in December 2003 of the British Geotechnical Association's international Fleming award for excellence in geotechnical design and construction. The award was for the innovative 'observational approach' used in optimising the design of the tunnel launch shaft in Whitehall, and for the soil-nailed open-cut section of the works accommodating the northern cut and cover tunnel. The award was shared with the recovery operation project for the World Trade Center, following the 2001 attack.

== Safety features ==
There are 15 pedestrian crossing points (PCPs) situated 250 m apart with emergency telephone and fire fighting niches. Additional fire hose reels are located 125 m from each niche. There are four vehicle crossover points at 1 km intervals comprising a lay-by plus emergency and recovery area. These are located under Shantalla, Collins Avenue (site of the original launch shaft), Marino and Cloisters.

GSM telephone and FM radio coverage is carried into the tunnel with break-in facilities over public broadcasts in the event of an emergency.

There are 420 cameras attached to the vehicle management system (VMS). A maximum speed limit of 80 km/h (50 mph) is in place and HGVs are prevented from using the outside lane.

Overheight vehicles are detected up to 3 km from the tunnel portals and automatic signage is then deployed to stop the vehicle. If necessary, barriers can be lowered to protect the portals.

== Controversies ==
=== Safety lapses ===
RTÉ's Prime Time ran two reports (28 February and 4 March 2008) alleging that tunnel operator Transroute and the National Roads Authority were keeping the tunnel open in situations contrary to the tunnel safety manual. These included:

- SCADA computer system failures
- Failure of the tunnel's jet fans used for fire fighting (up to fifteen in one incident)
- Blockage of vehicle crossover points with water containers

The programme claimed that the tunnel safety manual had been re-written to allow the tunnel to remain open despite safety failures that would previously have required "immediate closure".

=== House damage ===
During the hard-rock boring works vibration caused some damage. Houses in the Marino area were surveyed before and after tunnelling and necessary repairs were reimbursed. There were 241 claims and these were adjudicated by a loss adjuster. A fund of €1.5 million was set aside.

=== City centre ban ===
Dublin City Council's policy was to introduce a ban on trucks in the city centre between 7 am and 7 pm, but it agreed to delay this ban for a period of two months until 19 February 2007. This was because of opposition from the Irish Business and Employers Confederation (IBEC), the Irish Road Haulage Association and the Dublin Port Company. The hauliers cited unreasonable traffic congestion on the M50, especially during the imminent widening of the northern section while IBEC and the Port Company were concerned about restrictions on the free movement of goods.

The Sunday Independent ran a story on 12 November 2006 revealing the ban came into force soon after the Tunnel opened. The then Taoiseach Bertie Ahern reportedly put pressure on the council to abandon their phased approach and initiate the ban in one go. The plan was criticised by opposition parties who said such a move would simply dump the problem onto an already "dangerously crowded M50".

The M50 ring road around Dublin has since been widened to 4 lanes (3 running lanes and 1 interconnecting lane between exits) in each direction and all of the interchanges are free-flow or partially free-flow since the end of 2010. This in effect negates the concerns regarding capacity.

=== East Link tolls ===
One company located south of the Liffey, Marine Terminals Ltd, considered taking legal action against the Council if it went ahead with banning trucks from the city. This was because a ban would force the company to use the tunnel, which would mean crossing the privately owned and operated East-link toll bridge, incurring a €4.80 charge each way. In response, the council agreed with National Toll Roads (NTR), the operator of the bridge at the time, to lift the toll for trucks.

=== Height controversy ===
Even before the commencement of construction, the tunnel was criticised for not being high enough. Critics argued that it would not be able to accommodate heavy goods vehicles higher than 4.65 m (15 ft) and that it should be built with an operating height of 5.5 m to accommodate virtually all sizes of trucks. Proponents of the chosen design argued that it made the best economic sense and that it would be able to accommodate most heavy vehicles with only a minor percentage having to use the surface road network. Construction went ahead as planned, but speaking at the breakthrough ceremony, Jimmy Quinn of the Irish Road Haulage Association stated that a future generation may look back and say (about the tunnel not being high enough for very high trucks): "Maybe they should have done it when they were building it."

In its submission to the public inquiry, the Irish Road Haulage Association did not raise the issue of the operating height of the Port Tunnel.

Among the 44 countries of the International Transport Forum (covering Europe from the Atlantic to the Urals), the 4.65 m operating height of the Dublin Port Tunnel is the highest specified height. Thirty-six countries have an operating height of 4 m. Three countries (Finland, Iceland, and North Macedonia) have an operating height not greater than 4.4 m. Four countries (France, Norway, Sweden, UK) have not defined a height.

=== Water leaks ===
In early 2006, media reports revealed that the tunnel was leaking substantial amounts of water. This was as a result of sub-standard concrete being poured. When the concrete was removed during remedial works, protective membranes were punctured, resulting in leaks. Once the membranes and concrete were re-instated, the leaks ceased.

=== Cost overruns ===
While it is often claimed that the project went over budget, this is not actually the case. The tender price of €457 million was for construction only while the total project cost was approximately €752 million.

In September 2005, it was reported that NMI was launching a claim for an additional €300 million. The council has stated that this claim will not be met and that the total project cost remains at €752 million.

=== Relocation of Dublin Port ===
In October 2006, as the tunnel neared completion, the Progressive Democrats held a conference on their proposal to relocate Dublin Port to Bremore on the outskirts of Balbriggan, and to redevelop the port area for mixed high-density uses. The then Taoiseach, Bertie Ahern, indicated his support for this proposal. However, this plan was abandoned following the wipeout of the PD's in the 2007 general election and the ongoing economic downturn.

=== FM radio coverage in Dublin Port Tunnel ===
The FM radio services rebroadcast in the Port Tunnel are RTÉ Radio 1, Newstalk, 98FM, FM104, Q102, Spin 1038 and Sunshine 106.8. Radio Nova, announced in 2015 that they were initiating legal action to have their service added.

== Tunnel runs ==
The Dublin Port Tunnel has been closed to traffic and used for 10k races on three occasions since it opened. The most recent event was held on 26 March 2017, when over 2,400 runners participated in the "Underground Run", with proceeds going to the homeless charity Focus Ireland.
