= Anna Livia =

Anna Livia may refer to:

== Places in Ireland ==
- Anna Livia (monument)
- Anna Livia Bridge

== People ==
- Anna Livia, author
- Anna Livia Plurabelle, a character in Finnegans Wake

== Radio station ==
- Dublin City FM, formerly known as Anna Livia FM
