= EToll =

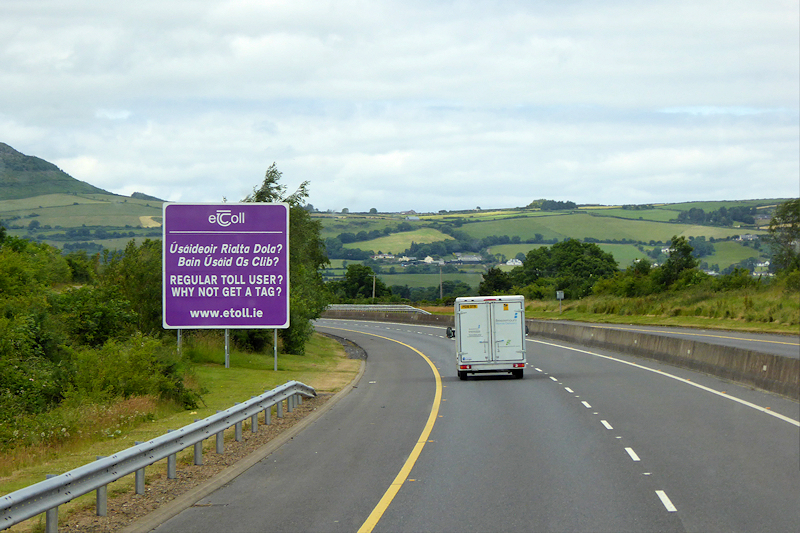
A sign informing road users of the availability of toll tags

The eToll road sign symbol, which uses a stylised insular T

eToll is an electronic toll collection system used in the Republic of Ireland. Run by the National Roads Authority, it is a interoperability system allowing cashless payment on all of Ireland's toll roads via an RFID tag attached to the windscreen of a participating vehicle.

== History ==
Prior to its introduction in 2008, some operators had their own incompatible schemes specific to their own road sections. Since introduction however, all 5 toll road operators issue interoperable eToll tags. Additionally, two private firms (who do not operate any toll roads) also issue and operate eToll tagging systems - of which one is subcontracted to provide branded tags for one operator, as well as their own.

== Technology ==
The system operates using in-car 5.8 GHz 802.11p RFID transponders, generally manufactured by Kapsch or CS Route.

== Operations ==
The eToll platform is operated by Egis Projects, a French company with toll operations in 15 different countries.

Where applicable, fees are charged to tag users at the same rate as cash prices for the same class of vehicle, and purchase/rent administrative fees for tags vary by tag issuer. Some tags also operate for other services, such as car parks, but this also varies by issuer.

Since the M50 motorway moved to "barrier free" (cash-less) tolling, eToll tagging has represented one of two options to pay the West-Link toll (the other system being video registration or post-pay services). In 2007, the NRA awarded French consortium BetEire Flow the contract to construct and operate the barrier-free tolling system at the West-Link bridge, and the eFlow system was introduced on 30 August 2008. The BetEire Flow consortium comprises the French toll operator Sanef and CS, a French systems designer, supplier and integrator. eFlow uses overhead cameras and detectors to record motorists' electronic tags or vehicle number plates. The technology involves two sets of gantries over the motorway. The first gantry detects the vehicle, and the second has antennae and cameras to read the tags and number plates.
