= Strawberry Beds =

Locality west of Dublin, Ireland

Strawberry Beds Na Ceapóga Sú Talún (Irish)
- Locality
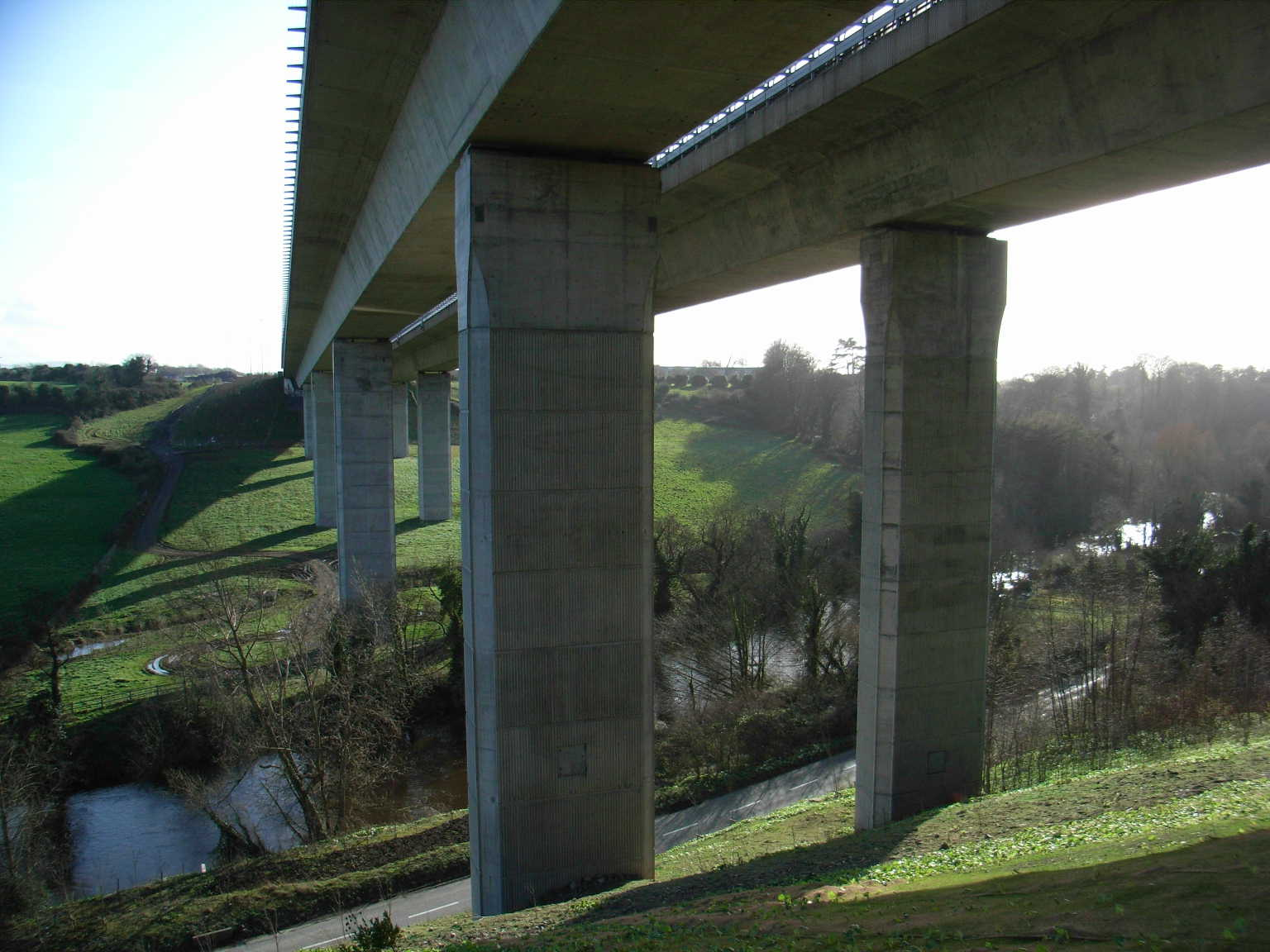
- The West-Link bridge carries the M50 motorway over the Strawberry Beds area

- Location in Ireland
- Coordinates: 53°22′03″N 6°24′13″W
- Country: Ireland
- Province: Leinster
- County: Dublin
- Local authority: Fingal County Council
- Elevation: 53 m (174 ft)
- Time zone: UTC+0 (WET)
  - Summer (DST): UTC-1 (IST (WEST))

Strawberry Beds or the Strawberry Beds (Irish: Na Ceapóga Sú Talún) is a locality and small settlement 7 km (4.3 mi) to the west of Dublin, Ireland, located on the northern banks of the River Liffey between Chapelizod and Lucan, where the closest bridges span the river. The populated suburb of Palmerstown lies just south of the Strawberry Beds, but is inaccessible due to the Liffey, which separates them. The R109 road, also known as the 'Lower Road' for the section between Chapelizod and Lucan, is the only road that passes through the Strawberry Beds. The area is protected by a Special Amenity Area Order (SAAO).

== History ==
Situated on steeply banking south-facing slopes in a sheltered valley, the area got its name from the strawberries which were grown there as a commercial crop for nearly 250 years. The strawberry crops were transported to Dublin's nearby fruit and vegetable markets for sale, as well as to hotels, restaurants and homes. However, it was for the sale of strawberries with fresh cream served on cabbage leaves to the travellers, daytrippers and locals that visited the area that the Strawberry Beds was renowned.

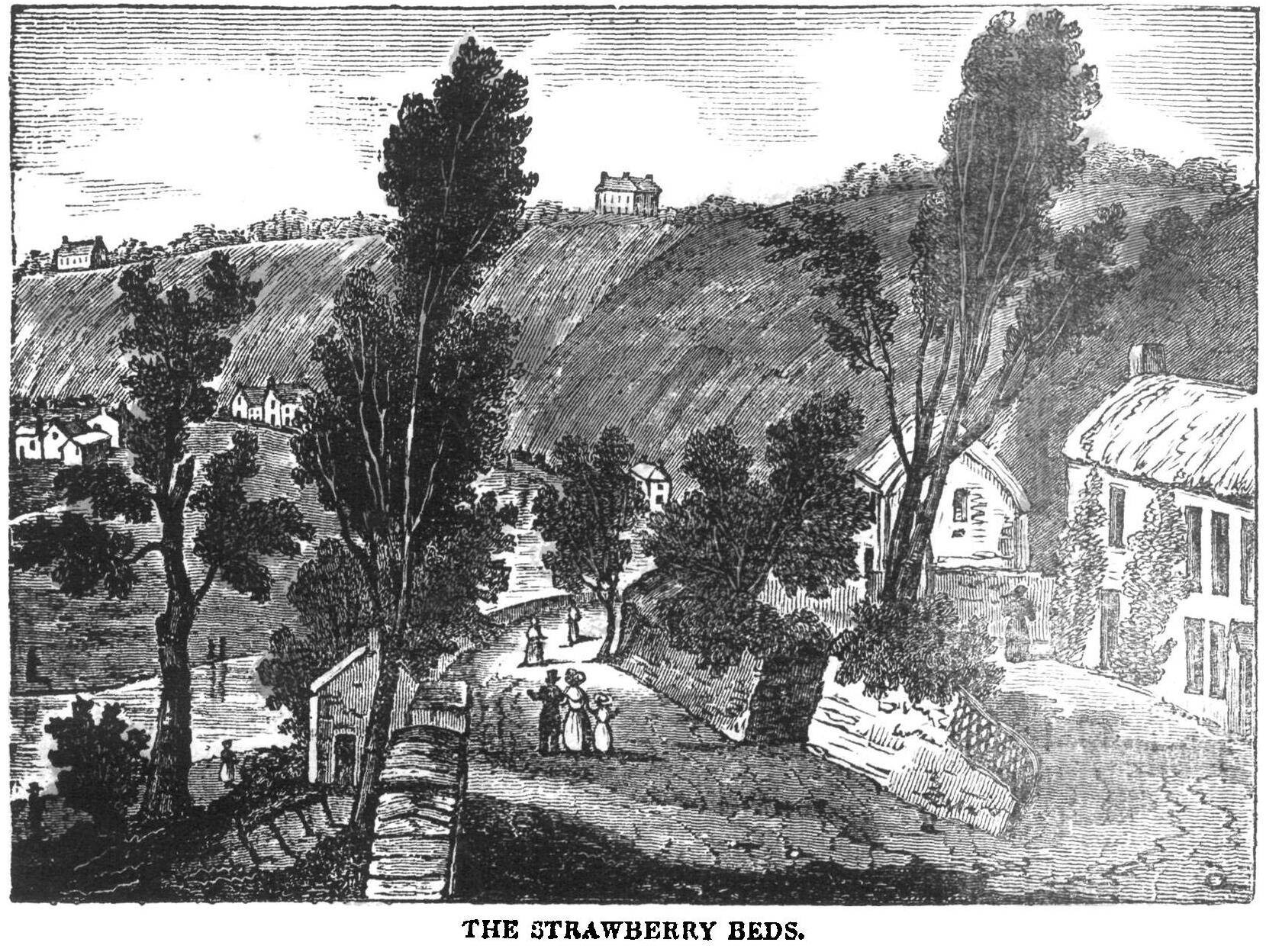
The Strawberry Beds, Dublin Penny Journal, 1835

During the 19th and early 20th centuries it was popular for Dubliners to travel by horse and carriage on Sundays from Carlisle Bridge (renamed O'Connell Bridge in 1882) to the Strawberry Beds at a fee of 3 pence per person. These routes "were so well patronised that it was not an infrequent sight to see a procession of these vehicles, amid blinding clouds of dust, extending the whole way from Parkgate Street to Knockmaroon". It was noted that the "strawberry vendors, pipers, fiddlers, and publicans reaped a rich harvest [on such days], the sounds of revelry filled the air, and when the shades of night had fallen, numerous involuntary dismounts were made from the cars on the homeward journey". In the era before air travel, the area was also a destination for newly-wed Dublin couples on honeymoon.

Much of the property in the area remained part of landed estates until the late 1800s, when the change in land ownership brought about by successive Land Acts and the work of the Irish Land Commission, which fostered a proliferation of private land ownership. Many of the individual holdings along the Lower Road are still evident.

== Historic buildings and places ==
=== Bridges ===
In the mid-nineteenth century, Farmleigh Bridge was constructed over the River Liffey by the engineering department of the Guinness Brewery to carry water pipes and electricity lines from the mill race turbine to the nearby Farmleigh House and the clock tower (which housed a large water tank). In 1990 the first span of the M50 motorway toll bridge, the West-Link, was opened. It stands 42 metres above the valley and carries the majority of traffic passing between the northside and southside of Dublin. Initially, some residents of the area objected to the construction of the West-Link bridge as they were concerned it would impact the scenery and environment of the valley.

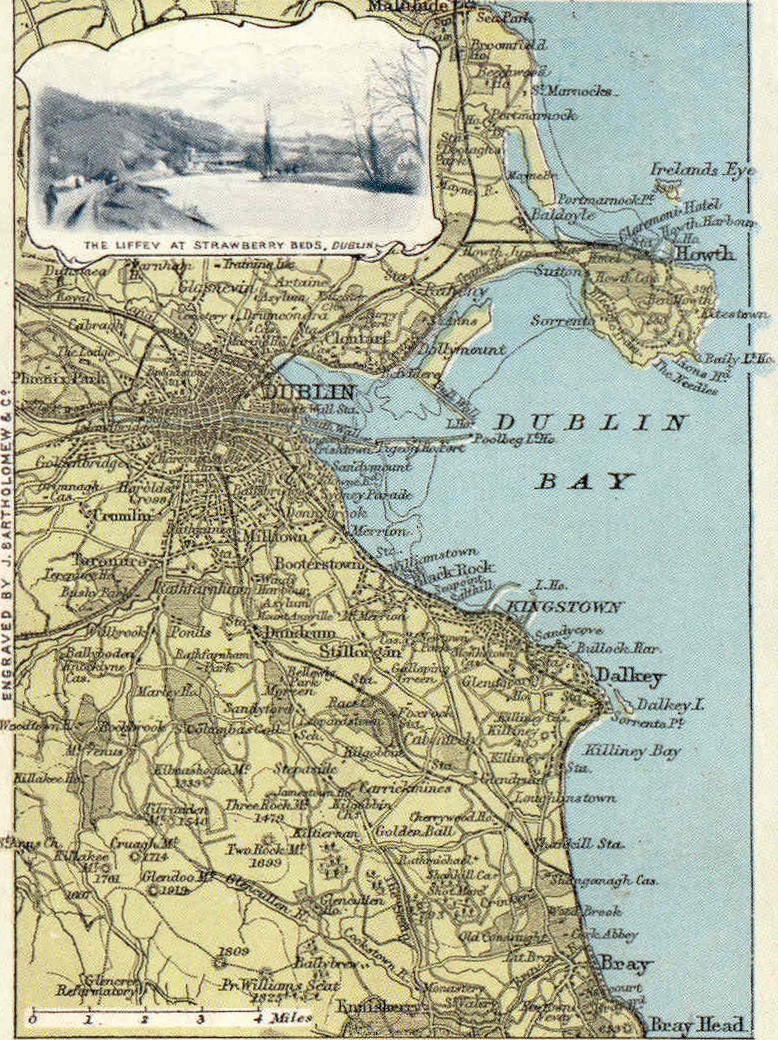
The Strawberry Beds inset on a late 19th-century postcard

=== Luttrellstown Castle ===
Luttrellstown Castle dates from the early 15th century (c. 1420), and is located in Clonsilla on the outskirts of Dublin close to the Strawberry Beds. It has been owned variously by the eponymous and notorious Luttrell family, by the bookseller Luke White and his descendants Baron Annaly, by the Guinness family, the Primwest Group, and since 2006, by JP McManus, John Magnier and Aidan Brooks. The castle has hosted visits by Queen Victoria in 1844 and 1900, and its media profile was raised when Victoria Adams married David Beckham there on 4 July 1999. Luttrellstown Demesne originally comprised the entirety of the townland of "Woodlands" in the civil parish of Clonsilla. Today, Luttrellstown Castle Resort and its remaining 560-acre (2.3 km^{2}) demesne currently form a 5-star resort, with a golf course and country club.

== Amenities ==
The locality is served by three public houses: The Wren's Nest, The Strawberry Hall and The Angler's Rest. The Strawberry Hall public house dates from post-1836 and The Angler's Rest Hotel was built in the late 1800s. A shebeen existed on the site prior to the building of the public house. The history of the Wren's Nest pub can be traced back at least five generations to the early 1800s from which point it came into the ownership of the current family. In the 1970s during renovation work a pitch pine beam in one of the main walls of the house was found to have the year 1588 carved into it, leading to speculation that the pub dates from this period.

The National School at the bottom of Somerton Hill was built in 1909.

== Transport ==
As of 2022, no bus or rail services serve the locality directly. The area is accessible by private car, bicycle or by foot. A bus route named the number 80 operated from 1940 to 1980 (approx.) operating from Aston Quay to Luttrelstown gates. It ran every two hours, although often less frequently. The service ended in the early 1980s due to the affordability of the motorcar.

In an 1836 Ordnance Survey map of the area, two ferries are depicted as operating on the Liffey. One was situated at the bottom of Knockmaroon Hill and the other was a half-mile upstream of the current Farmleigh Bridge. It is suspected that the ferry at this site was a private operation for the Guinness family as they owned land on the south bank of the river. The iron bridge eventually replaced the ferry. On the same map, a ford was shown across the river at the site of the current Strawberry Hall pub but its use was dependent on river conditions. Then, as now, the river can only be crossed safely at the bridges in either Lucan or Chapelizod. The cobbled flagstones which were placed on the riverbed to assist the horses and carts are still present to this day. Ferries continued to operate as a reliable means for foot passengers to cross the river in flood times as the boatmen and women were well acquainted with the river flow. Some of these ferries continued in operation up to the 1960s. Many local families also had their own boats to cross to the south bank.

== People ==
Former or current residents of the area have included:

- Delia Murphy (1902–1971), singer and collector of Irish ballads.

== Popular culture ==
- "The True-Lovers' Trip to the Strawberry Beds", c.1854 is a song about Dublin depicting a trip to the favourite courting spot of the Strawberry Beds.
- The Ferryman, a folk ballad written by Pete St John, is also known as The Strawberry Beds.
- A 19th-century version of popular Irish song Rocky Road to Dublin, reported by Manus O'Connor in 1901, references the Strawberry Beds in its lyrics.
- The cover of The Dubliners 1969 album At Home with The Dubliners is a photograph of the band in front of a fireplace in the Wren's Nest public house.

== Sources ==
- Troy, Patrick (2013). The Strawberry Beds. Na Ceapóga Sú Talún. Dublin: Original Writing Ltd. ISBN 9781782371250. OCLC 870598614.
