= West-Link =

Bridge over the River Liffey in Ireland

West-Link Droichead an Nascbhóthair Thiar
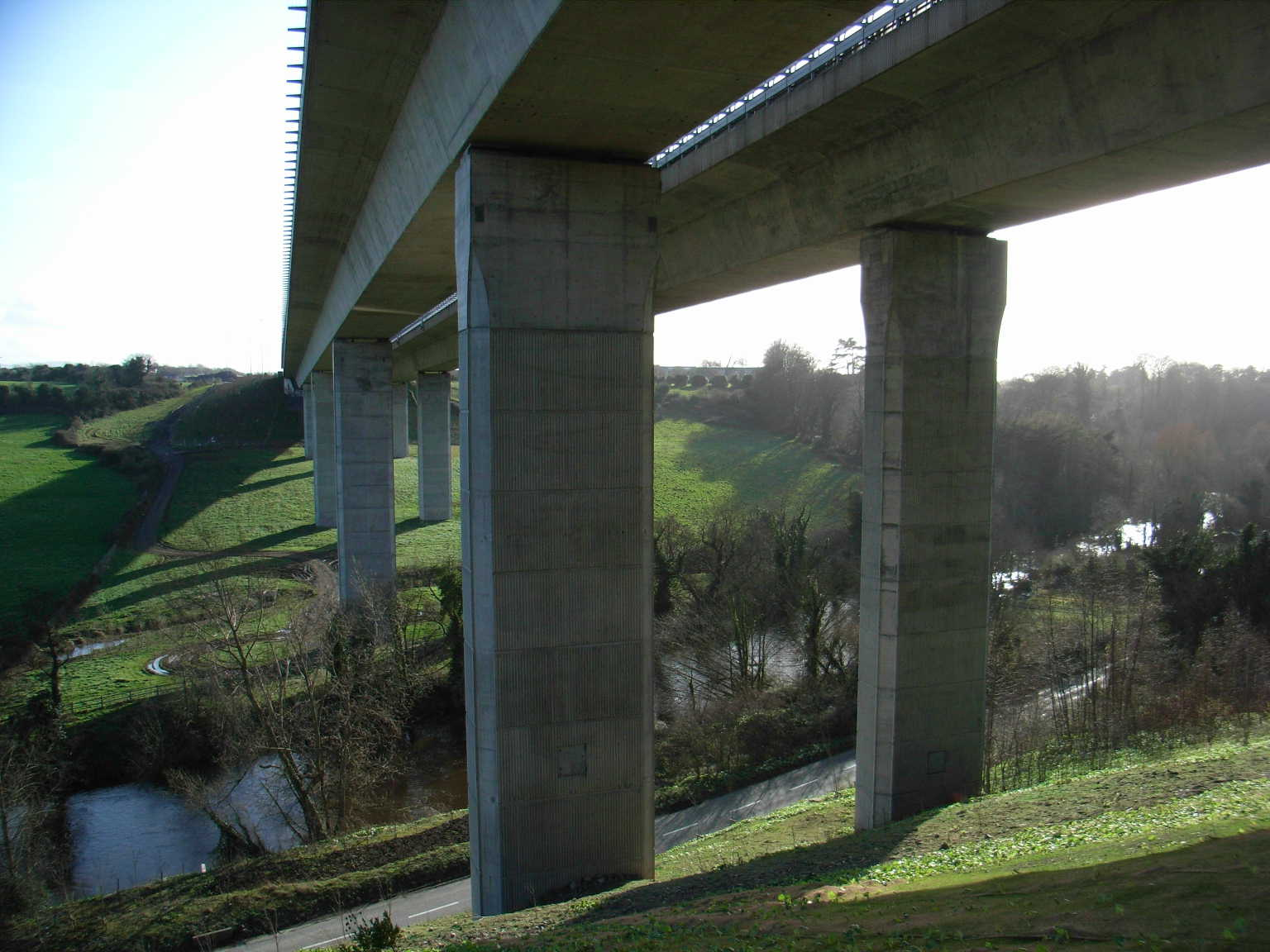
- West-Link bridges from underneath
- Coordinates: 53.362778°N 6.382703°W
- Carries: M50 motorway
- Crosses: River Liffey, R109 regional road
- Locale: Dublin, Ireland
- Preceded by: Lucan Bridge
- Followed by: Farmleigh Bridge

Characteristics
- Design: Twin bridges
- Total length: ~385m
- Height: ~42m

History
- Construction start: 1987 (1st span); 2000 (2nd span)
- Construction end: 1990 (1st span); 2003 (2nd span)

Statistics
- Toll: Barrier-less toll (operated by eFlow)

Location
- Interactive map of West-Link

The West-Link (Irish: Droichead an Nascbhóthair Thiar) is a set of twin bridges over the River Liffey in Dublin. A toll bridge, the West Link forms the central section of the Western Parkway route of the M50 ring road motorway.

== History ==
Plans were announced for the construction of the bridge in 1987, and launched by Minister for the Environment Pádraig Flynn. At the time it was expected to be the largest bridge ever built in the state and to cost in the region of £30 million. When complete, the expected toll was to cost the driver "about sixty pence". The bridge was constructed as part of the first phase of the M50 motorway, and it and the section of motorway associated with it (Junctions 6–7) were the first section of the M50 to open in 1990. Built by NTR plc (then called National Toll Roads plc) under a deal with Dublin County Council, the bridge was an early example of public private partnership (although that term was not used at the time) and was the first section of toll motorway to open in the State. In return for constructing and maintaining the bridge, NTR received the right to operate it as a toll bridge for thirty years. Originally a single-span structure, a second span was completed and opened in September 2003. In 2007, the National Roads Authority reached a deal with NTR to buy out the toll bridge effective 1 August 2008. However, for traffic management purposes, a toll remained, a situation prompting widespread and ongoing criticism. NTR continued to operate the bridge until 29 August 2008 when at midnight eFlow took over. The toll plaza barriers were at that point replaced by overhead gantry-based electronic tolling.

== Structure ==
The bridge crosses the River Liffey at a point known as the Strawberry Beds. On the motorway it starts at a point approximately 2 km south of junction 6 (Blanchardstown) and runs to a point almost immediately north of junction 7 (Palmerstown). It is 385 metres long, and at its highest elevation, it is approximately 42 metres above the river. Figures from 2005 indicated that the bridge was carrying an average of 98,000 vehicles per day. The bridge is the only Liffey crossing between Chapelizod and Lucan Bridge (both of which are narrow two-lane structures) and thus it carries a large amount of traffic passing between the north and south Dublin suburbs.

== Tolling system ==
Since 30 August 2008, open road tolling has been in effect. As of 2026, the toll is €2.60 for cars on a tag account, €3.20 for cars whose number plates have been registered with eFlow on a video account, and €3.80 for unregistered cars. Unregistered vehicles can pay at Payzone outlets, by calling eFlow customer service or by paying on the eFlow website. Drivers who fail to pay receive escalating fines, depending on how long the toll remains unpaid.

Prior to 29 August 2008, tolling was usually by cash payment at a toll plaza to the former operators NTR plc. A prepaid tag system, Eazy Pass, has also been used since the early 2000s but was not barrier-free, unlike the present arrangements.

The tolling remains a single-point operation.

== See also ==
- East-Link (Dublin)
- Roads in Ireland
