= Islandbridge =

Bridge over the River Liffey in Ireland

Islandbridge Droichead na hInse
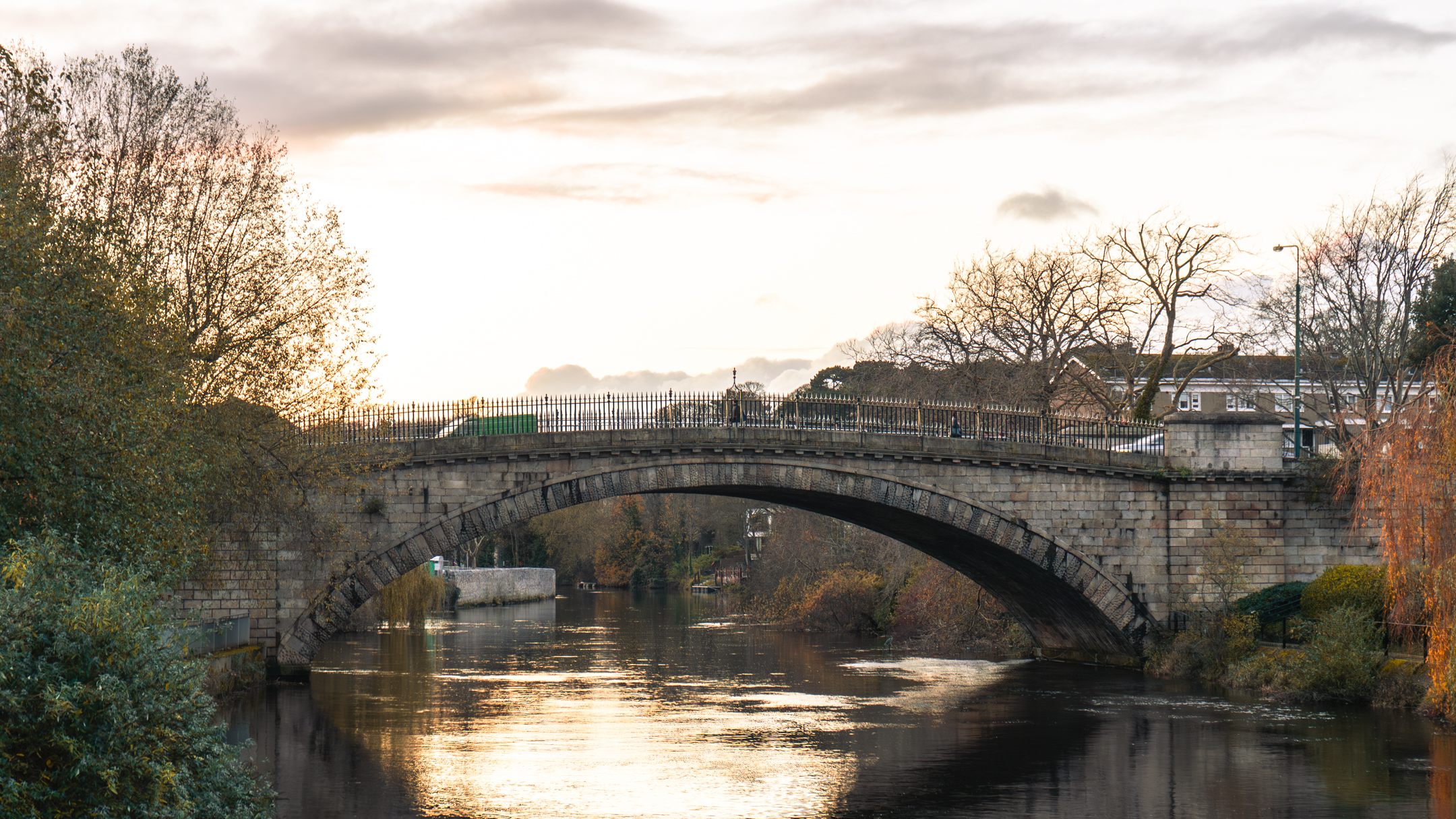
- Island Bridge
- Coordinates: 53.3472°N 6.3083°W
- Crosses: River Liffey
- Locale: Dublin, Ireland
- Preceded by: Anna Livia Bridge
- Followed by: Liffey Railway Bridge

Characteristics
- Design: Arch bridge
- Material: Ashlar masonry
- Total length: 32m
- No. of spans: 1

History
- Designer: Alexander Stevens
- Construction end: 1791-1793
- Opened: First: 1577; Rebuilt: 1791; Renamed: 1922

Location
- Interactive map of Islandbridge

Island Bridge (Irish: Droichead na hInse), formerly Sarah or Sarah's Bridge, is a road bridge spanning the River Liffey, in Dublin, Ireland which joins the South Circular Road to Conyngham Road at the Phoenix Park.

Island Bridge and the surrounding area (often known as Islandbridge) are so named because of the island formed here by the creation of a mill race towards the right bank while the main current flows to the left. The River Camac emerges from a tunnel further downstream towards Dublin Heuston railway station.

== History ==
The area around Islandbridge contains a number of notable Viking burial sites from the 9th and 10th centuries which indicate the area as being one of the earliest recorded contacts between the Vikings and Ireland. It was also a fording point, on the River Liffey, since at least the early medieval period, called Kilmahonock's Ford.

In 1577, during the reign of Queen Elizabeth, while Sir Henry Sidney was Lord Deputy of Ireland, an arched stone bridge was built here to replace an earlier structure nearby at Kilmainham.

This bridge was swept away by a flood in 1787, and between 1791 and 1793 the replacement bridge, that is standing today, was constructed. The structure is a single 32-metre span ashlar masonry elliptical arch bridge and was originally named Sarah's Bridge after Sarah Fane, Countess of Westmorland, wife of the then Lord Lieutenant of Ireland, who laid the first stone on 22 June 1791.

The bridge was renamed Island Bridge in 1922 following independence from Britain of the Free State, similarly to many other Dublin bridges originally named for British peers.

The bridge has become synonymous with the area, and the residential area around the bridge is now commonly known as "Islandbridge".

== See also ==
- Clancy Quay, formerly the site of Islandbridge Barracks

== Gallery ==
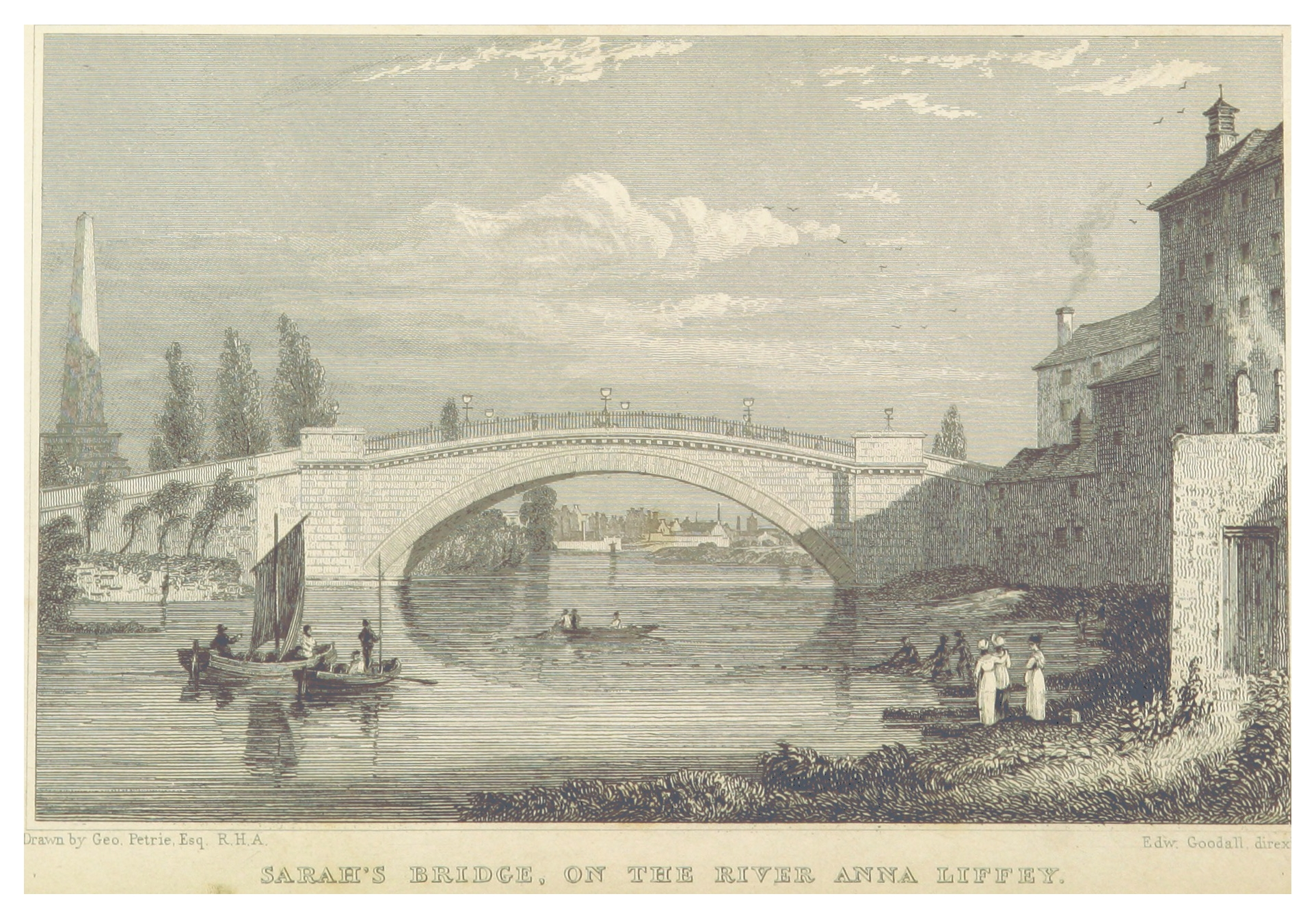
Island Bridge, seen here circa 1820 when it was known as Sarah's Bridge.

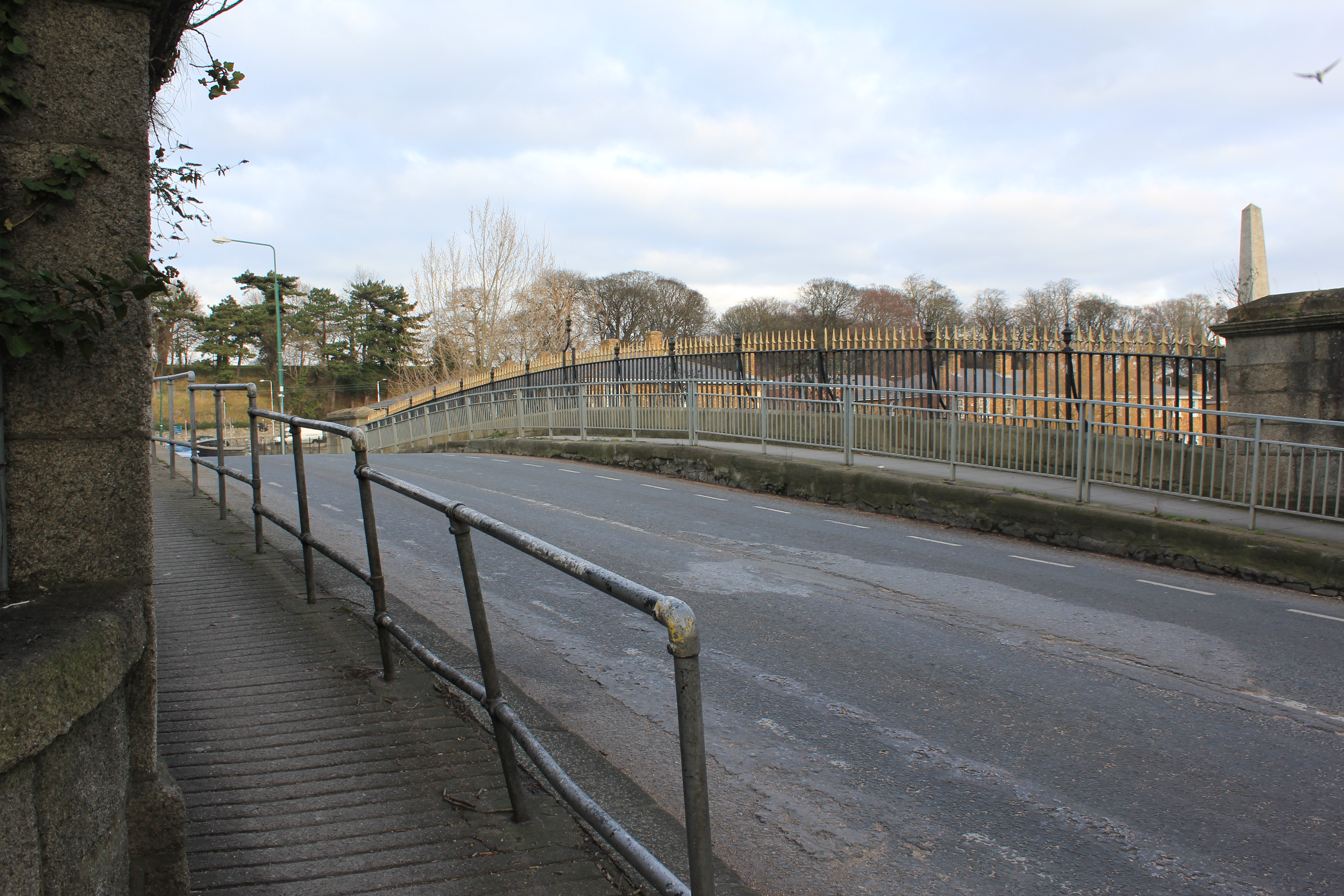
Road view of the bridge

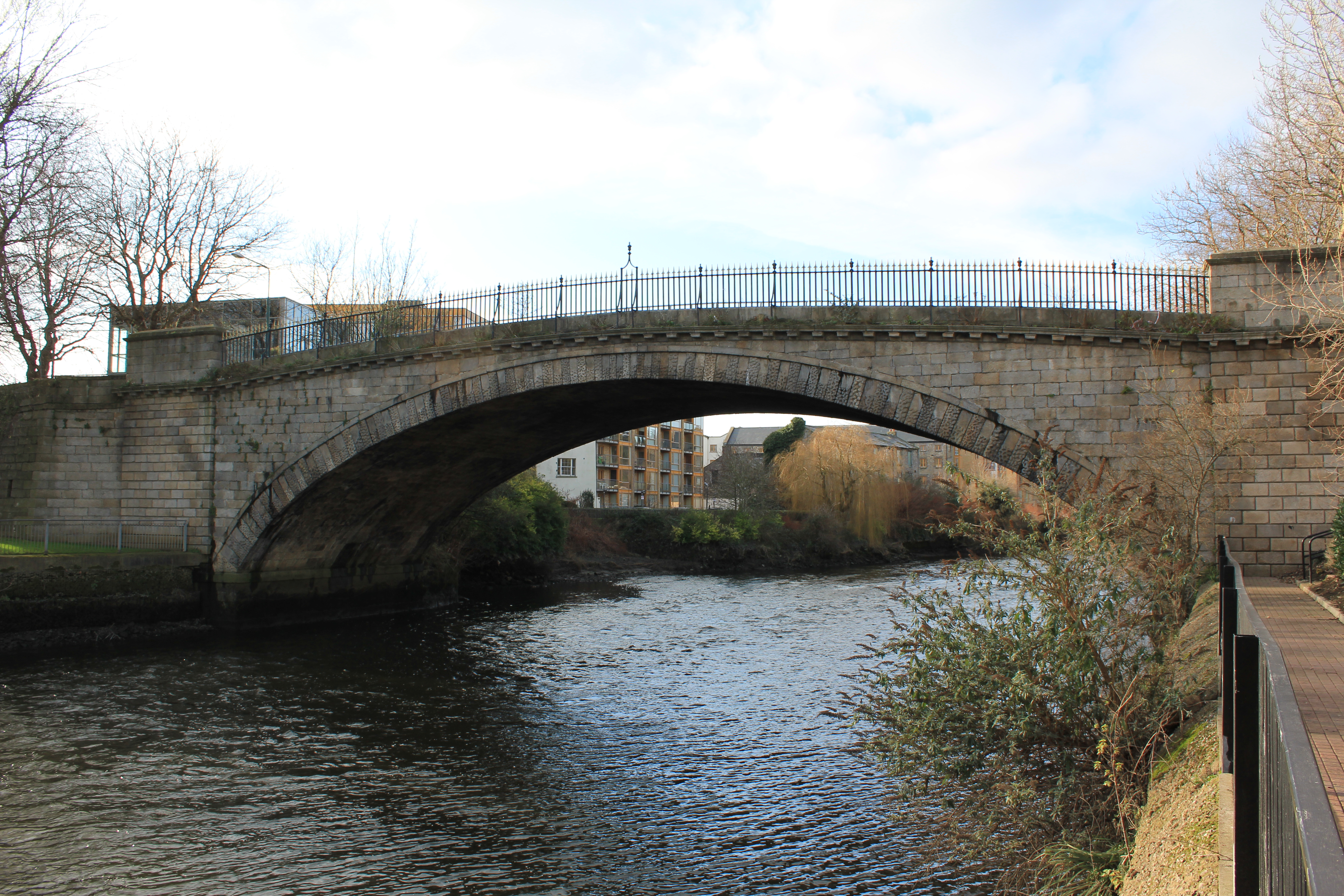
Islandbridge in 2012

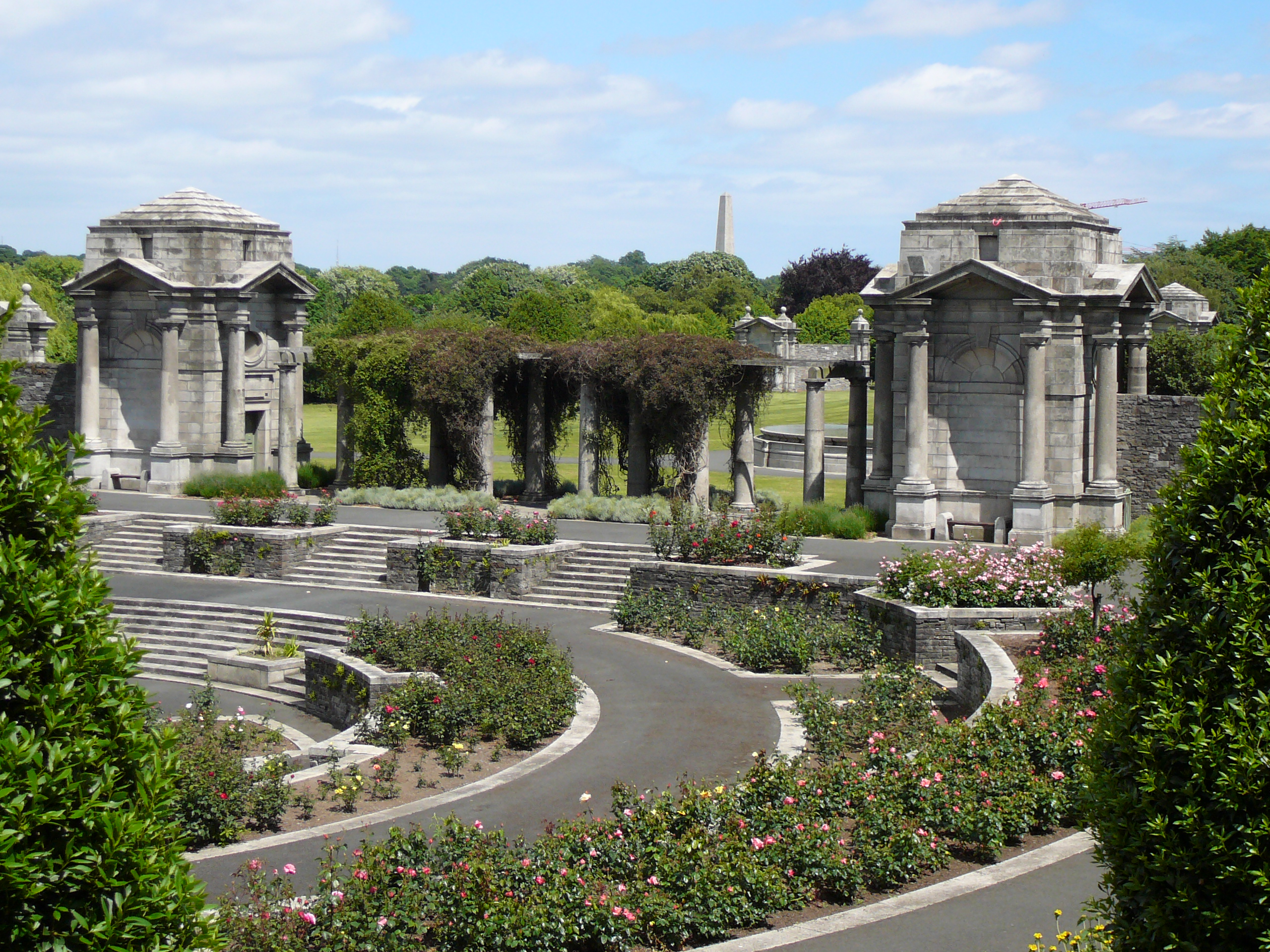
Irish National War Memorial Gardens
