= Farmleigh Bridge =

Bridge over the River Liffey in Ireland

Farmleigh Bridge Droichead Farmleigh
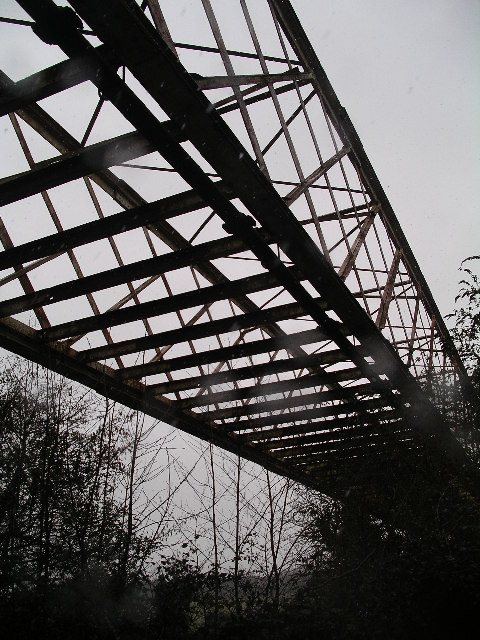
- Coordinates: 53.3613°N 6.3652°W
- Crosses: River Liffey
- Locale: Dublin, Ireland
- Preceded by: West-Link
- Followed by: Anna Livia Bridge

Characteristics
- Design: Box truss

History
- Opened: 1870s

The Farmleigh Bridge (Irish: Droichead Farmleigh), also known as the Silver Bridge, Guinness Bridge or Strawberry Beds Bridge, is a disused bridge spanning the River Liffey and the Lower Lucan Road in the Strawberry Beds, Dublin, Ireland.

== Form ==
Farmleigh Bridge is a single-span cast iron box truss bridge. It is about 52 m (170 ft) long and is supported by two stone and masonry supports faced with cut limestone blocks, and embellished with buttresses and round-headed arches.

== History ==
In an 1836 Ordnance Survey map of the Strawberry Beds area, two ferries are depicted as operating on the Liffey. One was situated at the bottom of Knockmaroon Hill and the other was a half-mile upstream where the current Farmleigh Bridge now stands. It is suspected that the ferry at this site was a private operation for the Guinness family as they owned land on the south bank of the river. It is understood the iron bridge eventually replaced the ferry and was probably built by the engineering department of the Guinness Brewery. It was built in the 1870s to carry water pipes and electricity lines from the mill race turbine to the nearby Farmleigh House and the clock tower (which housed a large water tank), by Edward Cecil Guinness who had bought the estate in 1872. There were ornate gates at either end of the bridge and a tunnel entrance where it ended abruptly on the side of a hill. The pipes and cables were covered by a deck for pedestrian use. Privately built by the Guinness family, it was also used by staff who lived on the south side of the river (by Palmerstown) as a short-cut to the grand house.

== Status and conservation ==
The bridge (near the Angler's Rest pub) is long disused, with no remaining base or platform to carry traffic. Though the elaborate stone gateway remains, the tunnel is no longer accessible and has been collapsed.

As of late 2015, campaigners had initiated a petition for the bridge to be restored and used as part of a Liffey greenway plan. However, as of mid-2016, no funding had been allocated by Fingal County Council to renovation of the bridge. In 2021 it was featured in the RTÉ One television series Droichid na hÉireann.

In 2022, Fingal County Council allocated €1.5 million for works to conserve, but not reopen, the bridge.

== Sources ==
- Troy, Patrick (2013). The Strawberry Beds. Na Ceapóga Sú Talún. Dublin: Original Writing Ltd. ISBN 978-1-78237-127-4.
