= Anna Livia Bridge =

Bridge over the River Liffey in Ireland

Anna Livia Bridge Droichead Abhainn na Life
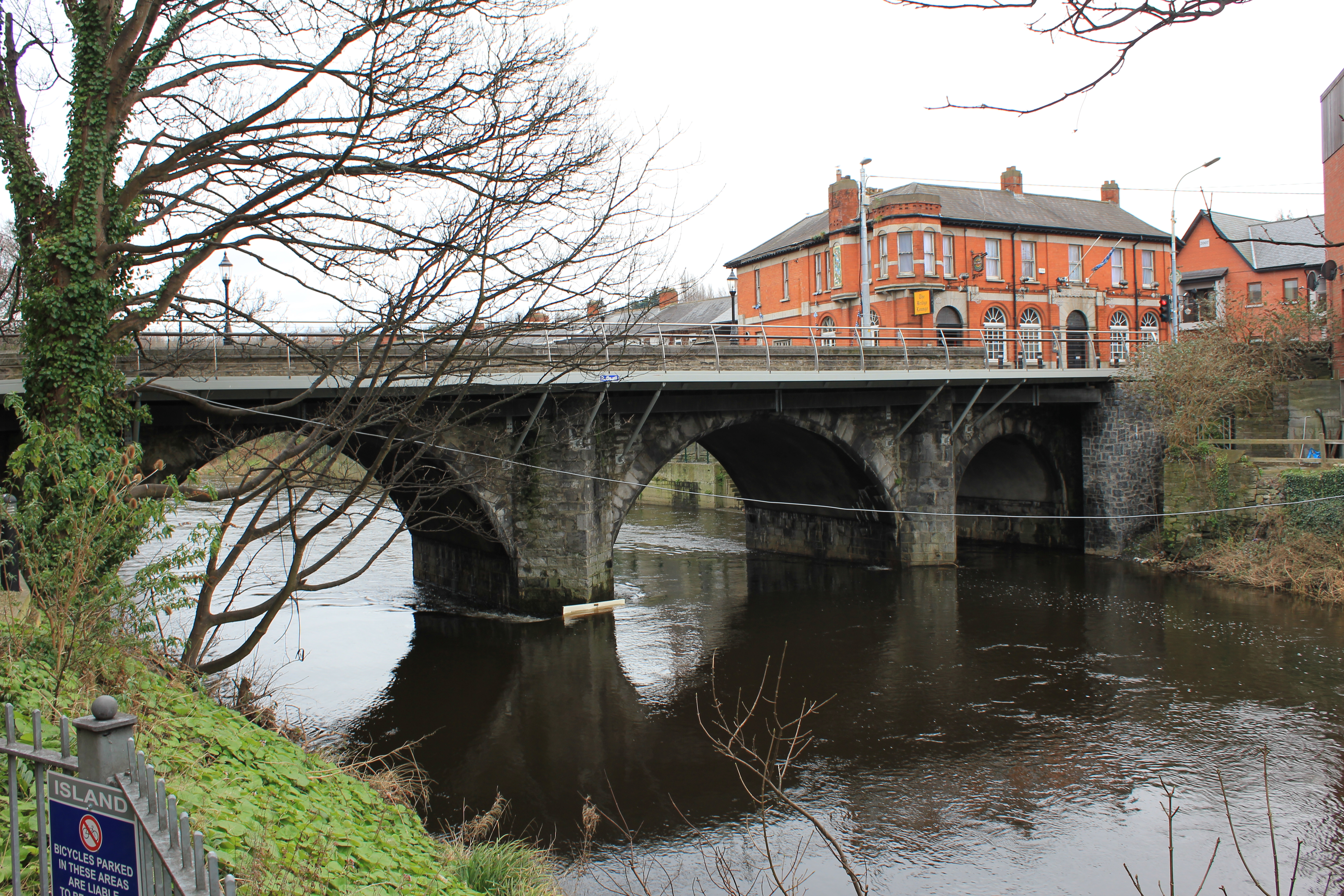
- Coordinates: 53.3479°N 6.3452°W
- Crosses: River Liffey
- Locale: Chapelizod, Dublin
- Preceded by: Farmleigh Bridge
- Followed by: Islandbridge

Characteristics
- Design: Arch bridge
- No. of spans: 4

History
- Opened: 1753 (Previous structure in 1660s)

The Anna Livia Bridge (Irish: Droichead Abhainn na Life, meaning 'The River Liffey Bridge'), formerly Chapelizod Bridge (Irish: Droichead Shéipéal Iosóid, meaning 'Isolde's Chapel Bridge'), is a road bridge spanning the River Liffey in Chapelizod, Dublin, Ireland which joins the Lucan Road to Chapelizod Road.

== History ==
As the Liffey flows into the town of Chapelizod, a weir divides the course to form a large mill race. Split by the two bodies of water, the island at Chapelizod has been a base for industry since at least the 18th century.

The main flow is crossed by a four-span stone arch bridge, having two large central spans and two much smaller end spans. This bridge was built in the 1660s, and originally named Chapelizod Bridge.

The bridge was renamed in 1982 to mark the centenary of James Joyce's birth. (The bridge is mentioned in Joyce's Dubliners, as one of his "Dubliners", James Duffy, lives in Chapelizod and visits a public house near the bridge. Anna Livia is the name given to the personification of the River Liffey, and was a principal character in Joyce's Finnegans Wake – her final monologue recalls her life as she walks along the Liffey.)

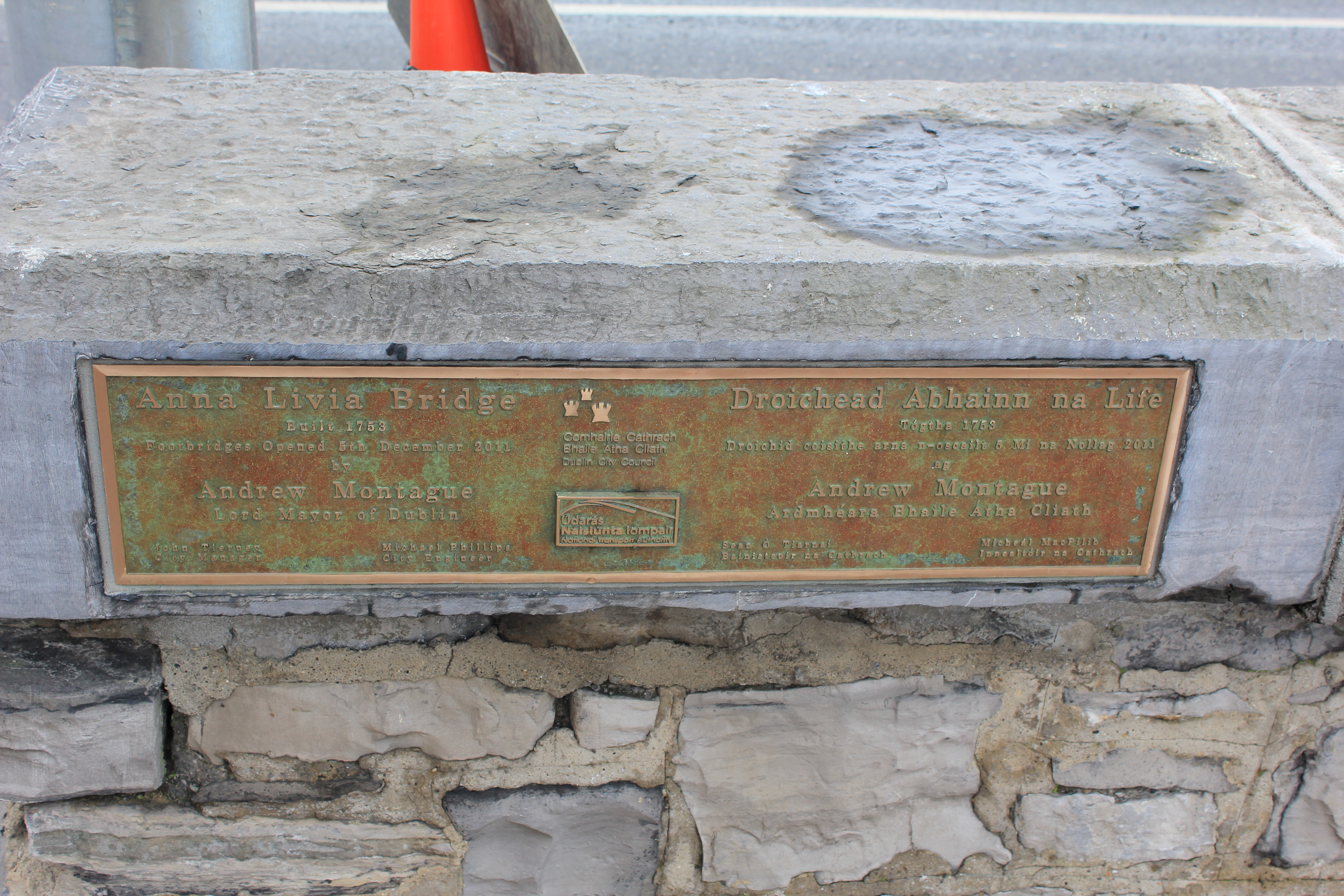
Plaque on the bridge

== Recent developments ==
As the only bridge 8 km past the Strawberry Beds to Chapelizod, and a main thoroughfare for traffic from the western suburbs (e.g.: Clonsilla and Blanchardstown) to Dublin city centre, the volume of road traffic over the bridge and through Chapelizod has increased in recent years.

Dublin City Council planned changes to the bridge, as part of a general "Traffic Management Plan for the Chapelizod area". The changes include the construction of separate footbridge sections outside the parapets of the bridge (to improve pedestrian safety), and the creation of cycle lanes on the bridge. Preparatory works for this initiative commenced in 2010 and the official opening was held in December 2011.
