= East-Link (Dublin) =

Toll bridge on the River Liffey, Dublin

Tom Clarke Bridge Droichead Thomáis Uí Chléirigh
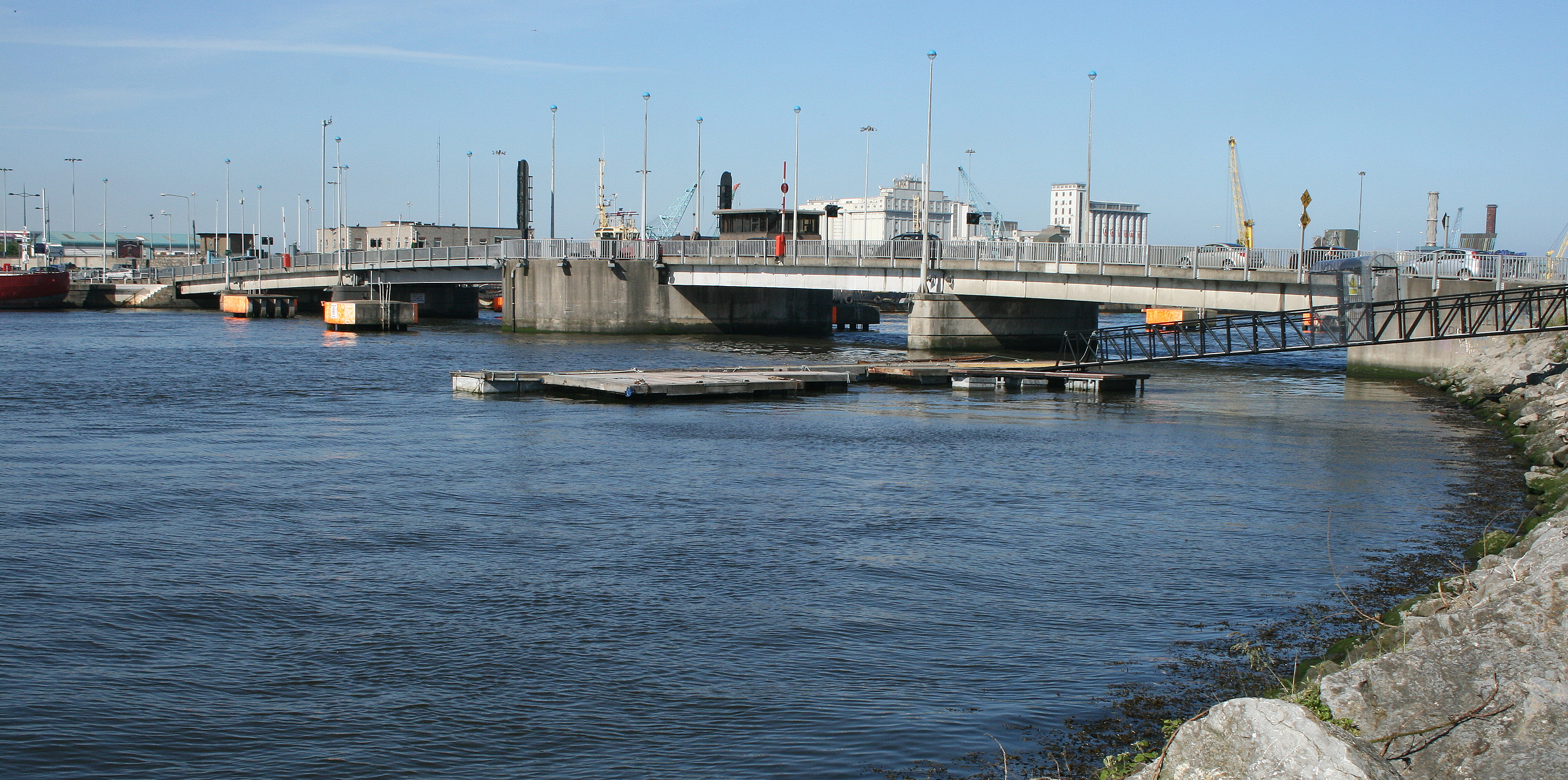
- The bridge from the south bank of the Liffey looking downstream
- Coordinates: 53.3457°N 6.2274°W
- Crosses: River Liffey
- Locale: Dublin
- Maintained by: Dublin City Council
- Preceded by: Samuel Beckett Bridge

Characteristics
- Design: Bascule bridge

History
- Construction cost: £8 million
- Opened: 21 October 1984; 40 years ago

Statistics
- Daily traffic: 14,000-17,000
- Toll: Motorcycles: Free; Cars: €2.20; Buses / Commercials < 2T: €3.40; Commercials > 2T (2 Axles): €4.60; Commercials > 2T (3 Axles): €5.60; Commercials > 2T (4 Axles): €6.80

The Tom Clarke Bridge (Irish: Droichead Thomáis Uí Chléirigh), formerly and commonly known as the East-Link Toll Bridge, is a toll bridge in Dublin, Ireland, on the River Liffey, owned and operated by Dublin City Council. The bascule-type lifting bridge, which links North Wall to Ringsend, is the last bridge on the Liffey, which opens out into Dublin Port and then Dublin Bay just beyond. The bridge forms part of the R131 regional road.

== Background and use ==
The bridge is the most easterly crossing on the Liffey and replaced a number of ferries that carried cross-river traffic at the point as early as 1655. The bridge was built by NTR, and opened to vehicular traffic in October 1984. The bridge reverted to city council control on 31 December 2015.

The city centre is west of the bridge, which links routes on the eastern side of Dublin city. The Dublin Port Tunnel terminates north of the East-Link along East Wall Road, in the Docklands on the north bank of the Liffey. Most of Dublin's docklands are east of the bridge, but it is raised on average three times per day to allow river traffic to pass.

As of 2016, between 14,000 and 17,000 vehicles per day cross the bridge. As of 2016, lorries and cars pay, either in cash or using electronic tokens, and cycles and motorbikes cross for free. The tolling area and administrative offices are on the south (Ringsend) side of the bridge.

== Name ==
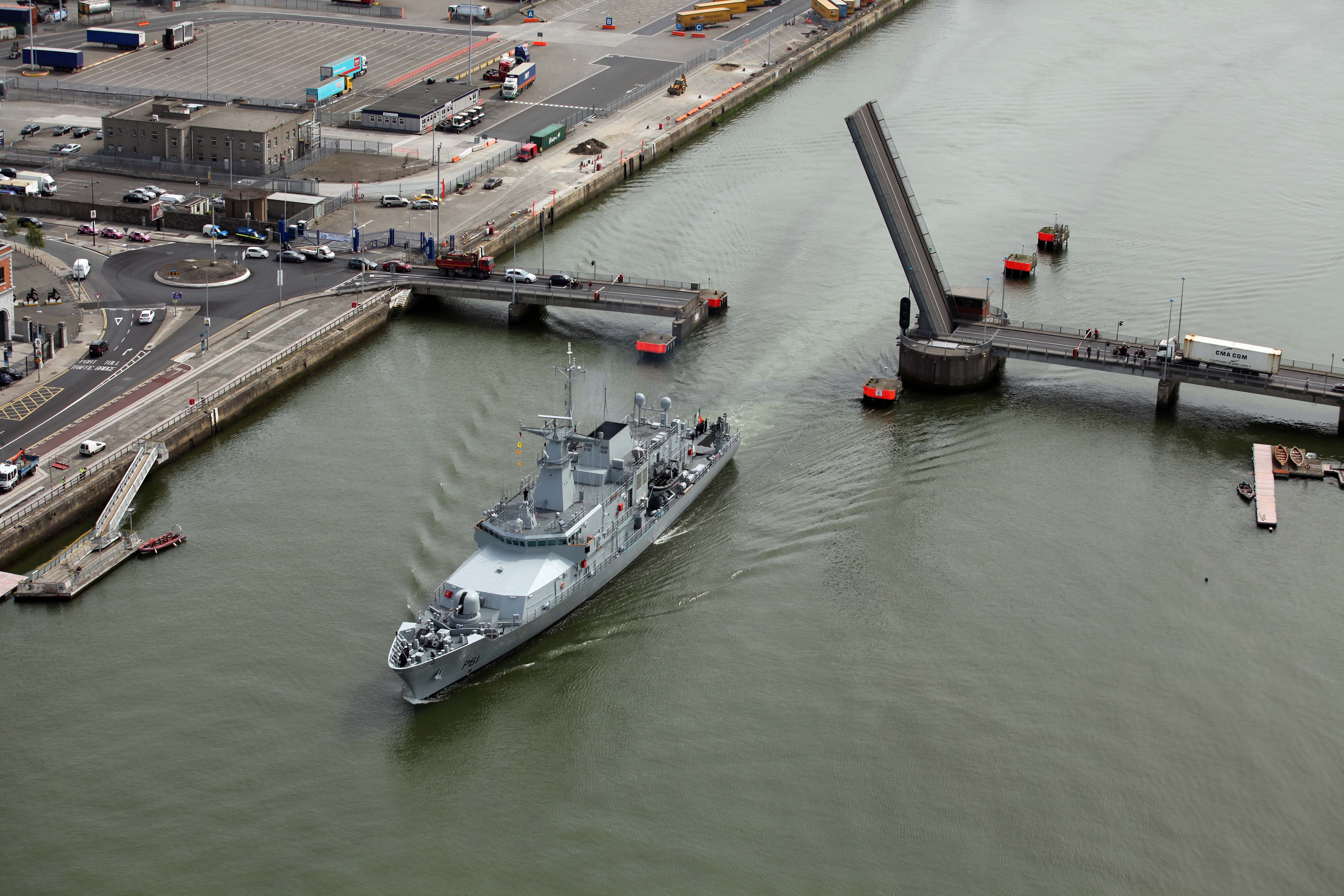
Aerial view with the bridge's bascule lift span raised for a ship

Originally adopting a functional name, the East-Link bridge was officially renamed as Thomas Clarke Bridge by President Michael D. Higgins to commemorate the Irish republican Thomas Clarke.

The renaming ceremony was held on 3 May 2016, marking the centenary of the day Clarke was shot in Kilmainham Gaol for his involvement in the 1916 Easter Rising.

== Incidents ==
In October 1985, a ship named the MV Miranda Guinness, with a cargo of Guinness beer bound for Liverpool, collided with the bridge.

== See also ==
- West-Link
- Roads in Ireland
