= EFlow =

Irish road tolling operator

eFlow
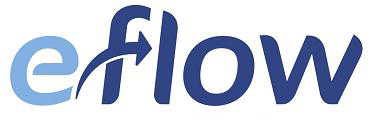

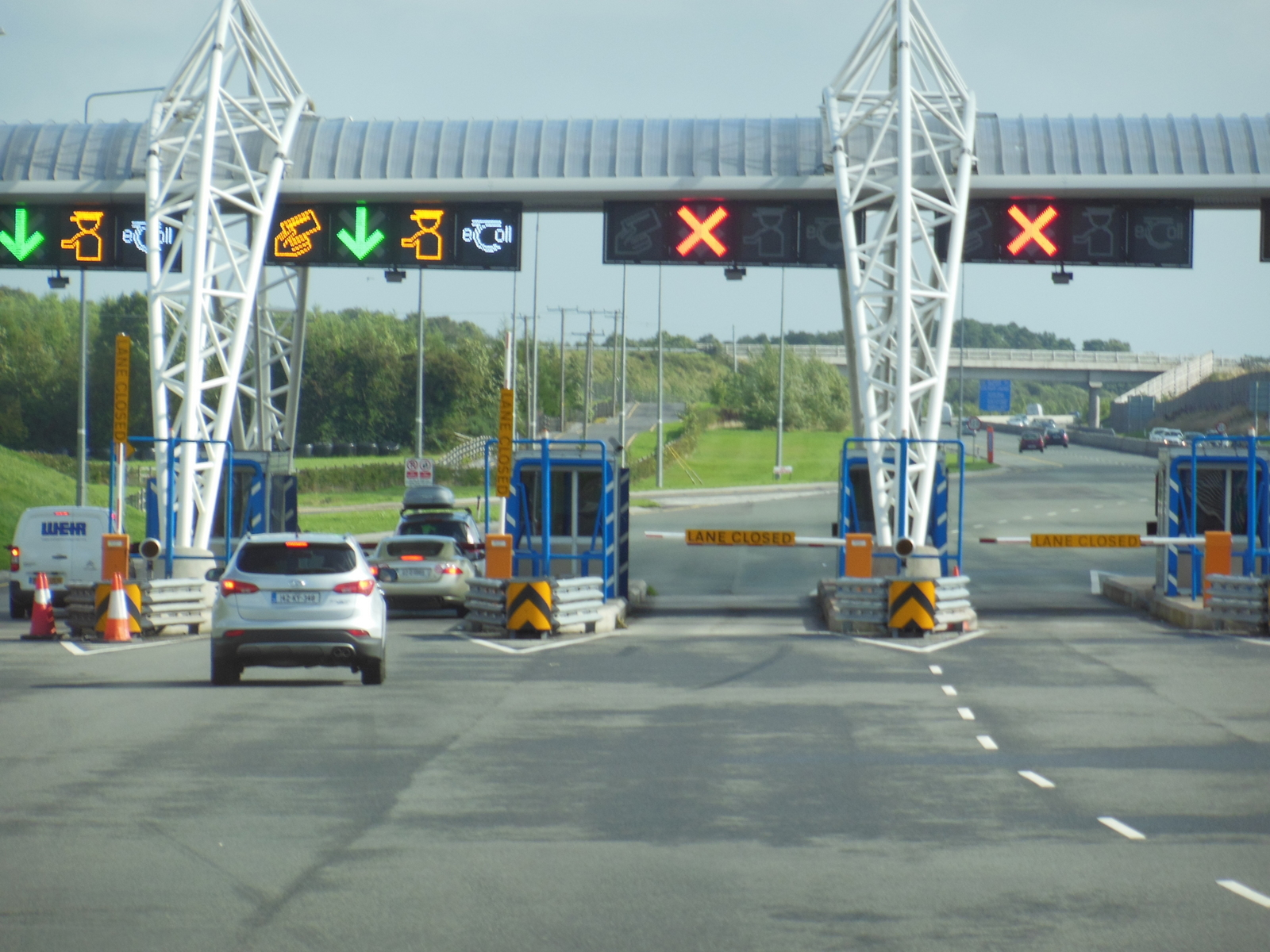
- The toll plaza on the M7 motorway with the eToll logo over the tollbooth showing that eFlow tags are accepted
- Product type: RFID tagging
- Current owner: Transport Infrastructure Ireland
- Country: Ireland
- Introduced: August 30, 2008; 18 years ago
- Website: eflow.ie

eFlow is the tolling brand name of Ireland's M50 motorway open road tolling operation. It is managed by Irish company Turas Mobility Services (a subsidiary of a French global organization called VINCI Concessions) on behalf of Transport Infrastructure Ireland. The tolling station is located on the M50 on the north side of the West-Link bridge.

Like other eToll systems, eFlow allows cashless payment on all of Ireland's toll roads. eFlow uses overhead cameras on the M50 and detectors to read electronic tags or number plates on vehicles.

In 2007 the National Roads Authority awarded the contract to construct and operate the new tolling system for the M50 to Sanef ITS Operations Ireland, a French consortium of toll operator SANEF and tolling system designer CS. Both companies have worked on similar electronic tolling systems in Europe and North America.

eFlow tags are "interoperable", allowing motorists to use them on other eToll plazas on Ireland's road network. Electronic tags from other providers - MiniTag, Eazy Pass, eTrip, Eirtag, PassDirect and Tolltag - can also be used on the M50.

With the introduction of the electronic system, the existing toll barriers began to be dismantled in September 2008, and drivers now pass through the toll point at normal driving speed. Bottlenecks at the old toll barriers often caused long tailbacks, which were often featured in the roadwatch traffic reports of AA Ireland.

== Charges ==
M50 toll charges as of January 2024

Vehicle type	Any tag account	eFlow video account	Unregistered
Car or public service vehicle (up to 8 passengers)	€2.50	€3.10	€3.70
Light goods vehicles (unladen weight under 2,000 kg)	€3.50	€4.10	€4.70
Buses or coaches (seating more than 8 passengers)	€3.50	€4.10	€4.70
Goods vehicles (unladen weight 2,000 to 10,000 kg)	€5.10	€5.70	€6.30
Heavy goods vehicles (unladen weight over 10,000 kg)	€6.30	€6.90	€7.50
Motorcycles	Free	Free	Free

eFlow tag registered vehicles pay a monthly account fee of €1.23.

=== Forms of payment ===
Payment can be made by cash, credit card, or debit card, either in stores or on the eFlow website. Toll charges must be paid by 8pm the following day of the journey or the driver incurs a penalty charge.

=== Exempt vehicles ===
The following vehicles are exempt from eFlow toll charges.

- Motorcycles
- Vehicles modified for disabled use
- Fingal County Council vehicles
- Army vehicles
- Garda and ambulance service vehicles
- M50 maintenance vehicles

== Controversy ==
Since the launch of the e-tolling system at the West-Link in 2008, it has faced controversy. In the opening weeks it was reported that up to 20,000 vehicles a day were not being recorded correctly, with some fleet and car-hire operators claiming up to 100 mis-directed fines per day. While the NRA initially stated that such issues affected only a small proportion of eToll users, Sanef ITS Operations Ireland has since acknowledged issues with incorrect toll charges for a "significant minority".
