= NTR plc =

Irish renewable energy company

- Type: Public, unlisted
- Founded: Dublin, Ireland (1978)
- Headquarters: Dublin, Ireland
- Key people: Rosheen McGuckian, CEO; Tom Roche, Chairman
- Products: wind energy
- Website: www.ntrplc.com

NTR plc is an Irish renewable energy company founded in 1978. Today, NTR is an investor in wind energy, solar energy, battery storage focused on Ireland, France, Finland, Sweden, Italy, Spain and the UK.

NTR previously held stakes in infrastructure interests including Celtic Anglian Water, Greenstar Recycling, and in infrastructural providers of roads through National Toll Roads. It spun these off into a separate company, Atlas Investments, and focused on wind energy in Ireland and the UK.

In 2008, NTR purchased a controlling stake in Wind Capital Group of St. Louis, Missouri, U.S. The company exited the U.S. market in 2015 to "focus on Europe".

NTR is an Irish public limited company. Its shares are not listed on any stock exchange but are traded on the grey market via the company's stockbrokers, Davy Stockbrokers, Goodbody, Merrion Capital Group and Investec.
