= Transport Infrastructure Ireland =

State agency in Ireland

- Bonneagar Iompair Éireann
- Logo of Transport Infrastructure Ireland

State agency overview
- Formed: 1 August 2015; 11 years ago
- Preceding agencies: National Roads Authority; Railway Procurement Agency
- Type: Statutory Body
- Jurisdiction: Ireland
- Headquarters: Parkgate Business Centre, Parkgate Street, Dublin 8; 53.34776°N 6.29420°W
- Employees: ▲286 (2022); 279 (2021)
- Annual budget: ▼€1.3 billion (2022); €1.5 billion (2021)
- Minister responsible: Darragh O'Brien, Minister for Transport
- State agency executives: Peter Walsh, CEO; Gareth Llewellyn, Chairman
- Parent department: Department of Transport
- Key document: Roads Act 2015
- Website: Official website

Transport Infrastructure Ireland (TII, Irish: Bonneagar Iompair Éireann) is a state agency in Ireland, dealing with road and public transport infrastructure. It is the operational name of the National Roads Authority, which was rebranded in 2015 after a merger with the Railway Procurement Agency.

The agency, a non-commercial semi-state body, looks after certain major roads, and some forms of light and metro rail infrastructure, and related services. It is distinct from the National Transport Authority and the Commission for Railway Regulation, which are also aegis bodies of the Department of Transport.

The National Roads Authority (NRA, Irish: An tÚdarás um Bóithre Náisiúnta) is a state body in Ireland, responsible for the national road network.

The Railway Procurement Agency (RPA, Irish: An Ghníomhaireacht um Fháil Iarnród) was a state agency of the Department of Transport, Tourism and Sport in the Ireland, charged with the development of light railway and the future metro infrastructure.

== History ==
The National Roads Authority (NRA) was established in 1994 to provide central management for Ireland's national road network, while the Railway Procurement Agency (RPA) was founded in 2001 to arrange for new light rail and metro projects. The RPA was merged into the NRA under the Roads Act of 2015, and the body was operationally named, and publicly rebranded, as Transport Infrastructure Ireland.

== National Roads Authority ==
National Roads Authority (NRA)

State Agency of the Department of Transport, Tourism and Sport overview
- Formed: 23 December 1993
- Dissolved: 1 August 2015
- Superseding State Agency of the Department of Transport, Tourism and Sport: Transport Infrastructure Ireland
- Jurisdiction: Ireland
- Headquarters: St. Martin's House, Waterloo Road, Dublin 4
- State Agency of the Department of Transport, Tourism and Sport executives: Fred Barry, Chief Executive; Cormac O’Rourke, Chairman
- Key document: Roads Act 1993
- Website: TII website

The NRA was established under the Roads Act 1993 and commenced operations on 23 December 1993. On 1 August 2015, the functions of the Railway Procurement Agency were transferred to the NRA, which was branded with the operational name of Transport Infrastructure Ireland (TII).

County councils remain responsible for local and regional roads, as well as various tasks like setting speed limits. The NRA, meanwhile, was responsible for the planning, maintenance and construction of national primary roads and national secondary roads as well as establishing safety measures. Ireland's national road network consists of 2,739 km (1,702 mi) of National Primary Routes and 2,676 km (1,663 mi) of National Secondary Routes.

The body also plays an environmental and archaeological role as part of the road building programme, publishing an archaeology magazine, Seanda, since 2006. Since 2007 it has managed the eToll toll payment interoperability system operated by Egis Projects.

The NRA was headed by a chief executive officer (CEO) who reported to the NRA's board which in turn reported to the Minister for Transport. There were four departmental heads who reported to the CEO: the Head of Finance and Administration, the Head of Engineering Operations, the Head of PPP (Public Private Partnerships), Strategic Planning and Commercial Operations and the Head of Corporate Affairs and Professional Services.

In the previous decade, the NRA was mainly concerned with the extensive expansion of Ireland's motorway network under the National Development Plan (NDP). The Transport 21 element of the NDP involved improvements to Ireland's transport networks including its roads. The NRA was responsible for making major improvements to key roads, especially the Major Inter-Urban Routes. These routes were the N1/M1 (Dublin—north of Dundalk), the N4/M4/N6/M6 (Dublin—Kinnegad—Galway), the N7/M7 (Dublin—Limerick), the N8/M8 (Portlaoise—Cork) and the N9/M9 (near Naas—Waterford).

Major improvements were also made to many other national primary and national secondary routes, most notably the Atlantic Corridor routes (N15, N17, N18, N20, N24, N25) and the N11/M11 (Dublin—Wexford).

=== Procurement challenge ===
In the contract award procedure for the construction of the Dundalk Western Bypass motorway, which commenced with a call for interest issued in 2001, failure by the National Roads Authority to notify an unsuccessful bidding consortium, Eurolink, that they would not be appointed as construction contractor gave rise to a legal case raised in the European Court of Justice (ECJ) in 2008. The court ruled that Ireland's transposition of the EU directives on public works contracts, Directives 93/37 and 89/665 as amended, into Irish law was flawed. Order 84A of the Rules of the Superior Courts was amended as a result of the ECJ ruling.

== Railway Procurement Agency ==
Railway Procurement Agency (RPA)

State Agency of the Department of Transport overview
- Formed: 28 December 2001
- Dissolved: 1 August 2015
- Jurisdiction: Ireland
- Headquarters: Parkgate Business Centre, Parkgate Street, Dublin 8
- State Agency of the Department of Transport executive: Cormac O'Rourke, Chairman
- Key document: Transport (Railway Infrastructure) Act, 2001
- Website: www.tii.ie

The Railway Procurement Agency's (RPA) main role was overseeing the operation of the Luas system, along with the planning of new Luas and Metro lines for Dublin as laid out under the Irish Government's Capital Investment Plan. The operation of the Luas is contracted out to Transdev, and the RPA were responsible for monitoring their performance. The agency had no role in the mainline railway system, which was and is operated by Iarnród Éireann, itself a subsidiary of CIÉ. The RPA was also charged with developing an integrated ticketing system for all public transport modes in Dublin. This resulted in the introduction of the TFI Leap Card on 12 December 2011.

The agency was established on 28 December 2001, under the Transport (Railway Infrastructure) Act 2001, and dissolved on 1 August 2015, under the terms of the Roads Act 2015, when all of its functions were transferred to the National Roads Authority (NRA). In order to better reflect its expanded remit, the NRA has since 1 August 2015 described itself for operational purposes as Transport Infrastructure Ireland.

In 2006, the RPA were criticised for allowing the Red Line to be opened, in the knowledge that parts of the track support of line were faulty in regards to track support. This became public through an independent report by Austrian consultants. Early on the CIÉ project director of Luas, Donal Mangan, took legal action as he felt that he had the right to be its chief executive. For two years the agency paid his salary and gave him an office, even though the chief executive's position had been filled by Frank Allen.

=== Initiatives ===
The RPA had a crucial role in implementing key rail elements of the Irish Government's initiatives, administered by the National Transport Authority. It was responsible for the planning, coordination and procurement through conventional means, and through Public Private Partnership, where necessary, of the following projects:

- Dublin Metro, consisting of Metro North and Metro West- deferred indefinitely in 2011
- The RPA was also responsible for planning new Luas lines to Lucan, along with a second Green line extension to Bray

The RPA was also responsible for the following projects, all now complete:

- Connolly Station to Point Depot extension - Red Line (completed in 2009)
- Sandyford to Cherrywood/Brides Glen extension - Green Line (completed in 2010)
- Belgard to Citywest extension - Red Line (completed in 2011)
- St Stephen's Green to Broombridge (Luas Cross City) extension - Green Line (completed in 2017)
