= Main line (railway) =

Main portion of a railway line

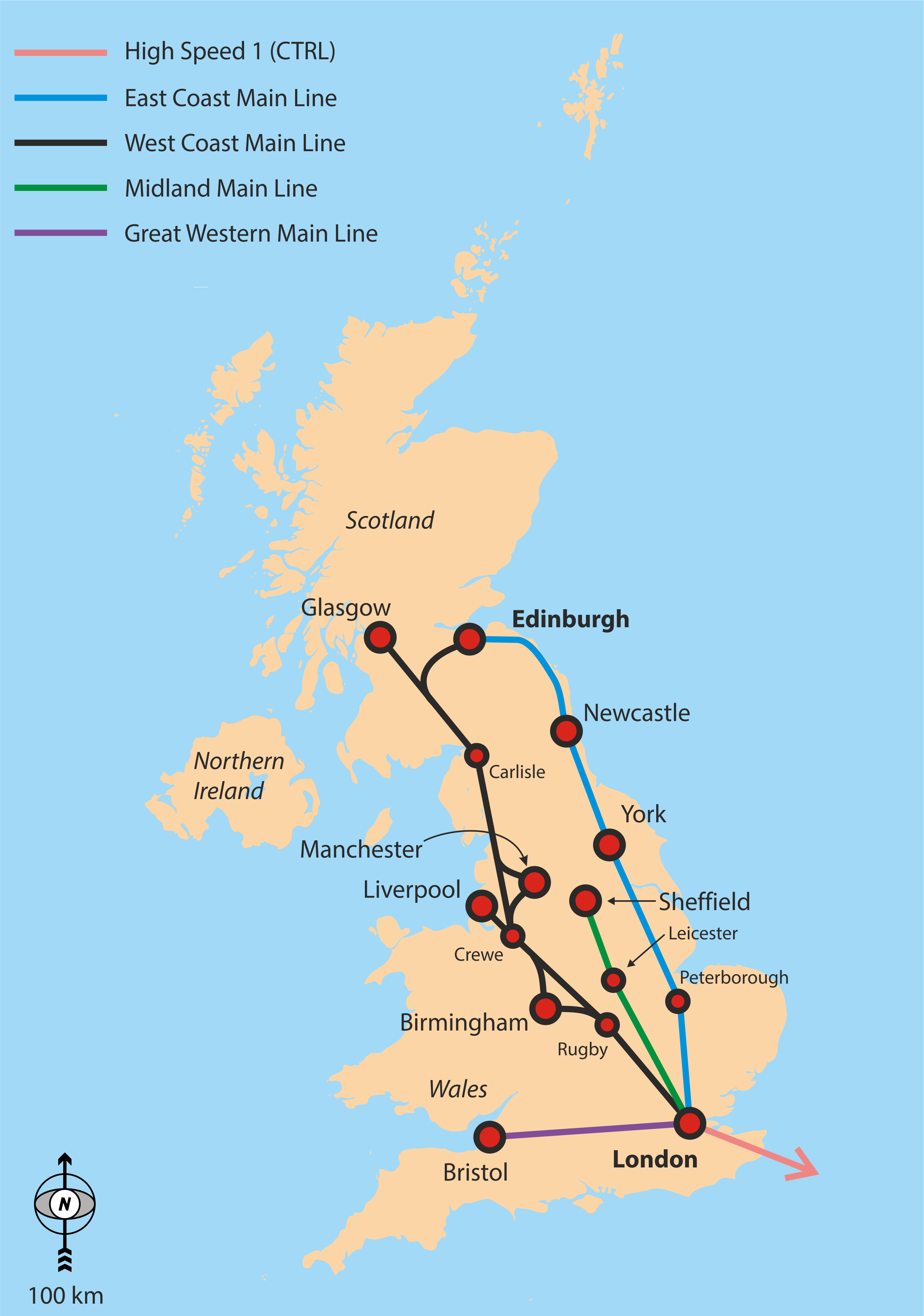
British main lines railway diagram

The main line, or mainline in American English, of a railway is a track that is used for through trains or is the principal artery of the system from which branch lines, yards, sidings, and spurs are connected. It generally refers to a route between towns, as opposed to a route providing suburban or metro services. It may also be called a trunk line, for example the Grand Trunk Railway in Canada, or the Trunk Line in Norway.

For capacity reasons, main lines in many countries have at least a double track and often contain multiple parallel tracks. Main line tracks are typically operated at higher speeds than branch lines and are generally built and maintained to a higher standard than yards and branch lines. Main lines may also be operated under shared access by a number of railway companies, with sidings and branches operated by private companies or single railway companies.

Railway points (UK) or switches (US) are usually set in the direction of the main line by default. Failure to do so has been a factor in several fatal railway accidents, for example the Buttevant Rail Disaster in Ireland, and the Graniteville train crash in the US.

== Examples ==
=== Japan ===
- Tokaido Shinkansen
- Hakodate Main Line
- Sōya Main Line
- Sekihoku Main Line
- Senmō Main Line
- Muroran Main Line
- Hidaka Main Line
- Nemuro Main Line
- Tohoku Main line
- Ōu Main Line
- Uetsu Main Line
- Shin'etsu Main Line
- Sōbu Main Line
- Chūō Main Line
- Tokaido Main Line
- Takayama Main Line
- Kansai Main Line
- Kisei Main Line
- Hokuriku Main Line
- San'yō Main Line
- San'in Main Line
- Kagoshima Main Line
- Nippō Main Line
- Nagasaki Main Line
- Kyūdai Main Line
- Hōhi Main Line

=== United Kingdom ===
- East Coast Main Line
- West Coast Main Line

=== United States ===
- Northeast Corridor
