= Coaching stock of Ireland =

Rail passenger coaches

A wide variety of hauled coaches have been used on the railways of Ireland. This page lists all those since 1945.

== Republic of Ireland ==
When formed in 1945, CIÉ inherited from its constituents a motley collection of coaching stock from various manufacturers, in equally variegated conditions of repair. Although many were over 40 years old they had to remain in service until a programme of replacement could be found.

CIÉ, which controlled the Republic's railways between 1945 and 1987, and its subsidiary, Iarnród Éireann (IÉ) from 2 February 1987, have made great use of hauled coaches, though in recent years IÉ has turned increasingly to multiple units to replace old locomotives and coaches. IÉ and Northern Ireland Railways jointly own the current stock used on the Enterprise service between Dublin and Belfast, with IÉ nominally owning the odd-numbered vehicles and NIR the even-numbered ones, though all share a common Enterprise livery.

=== Current stock ===
==== De Dietrich (1997–present) ====
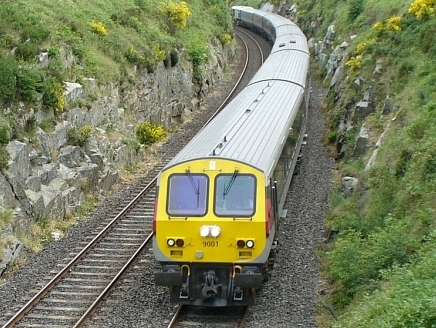
Enterprise DVT Number 9001 on a Belfast to Connolly service at the Wellington Cutting in 2006

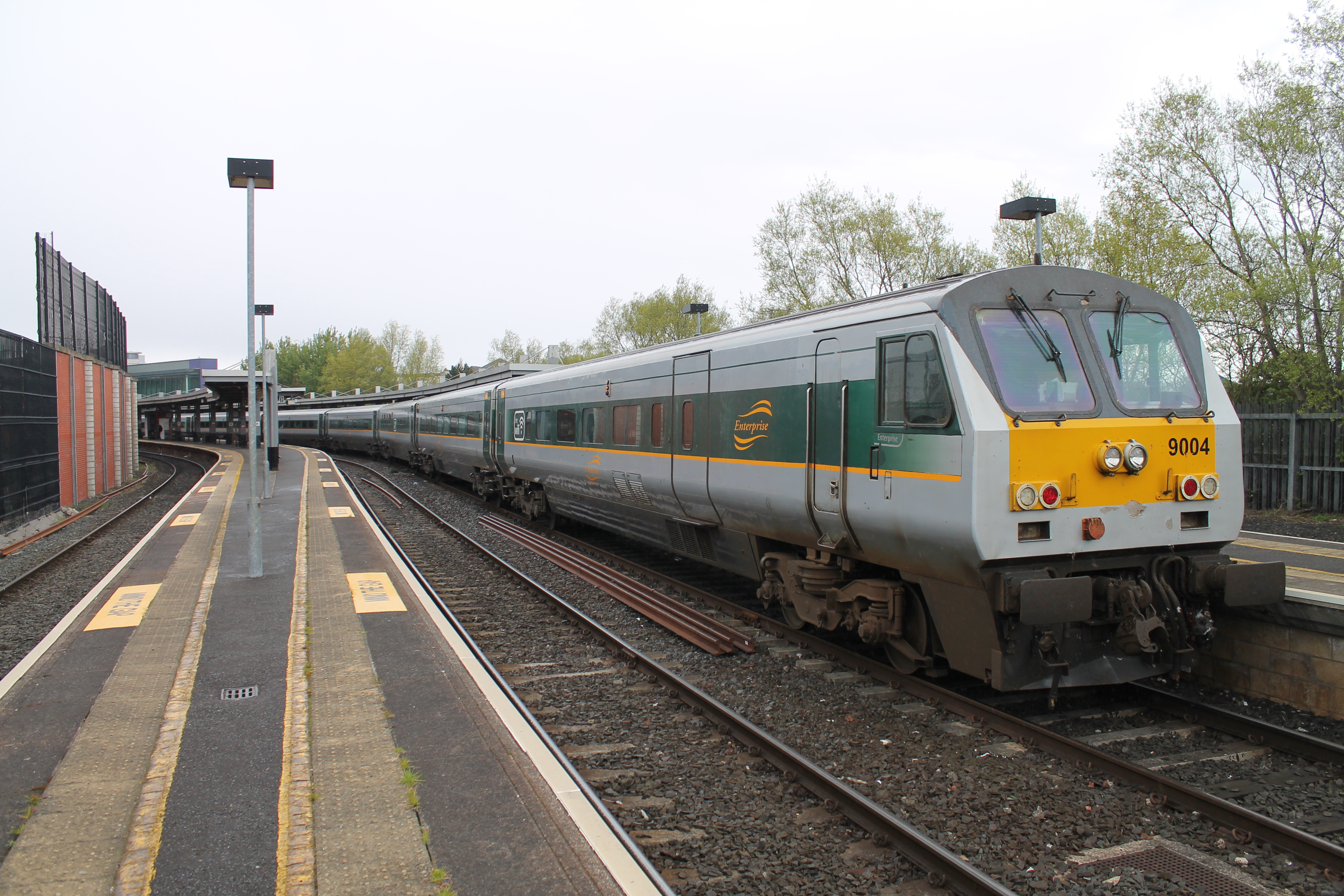
Enterprise DVT No. 9004 at Belfast Central in the older green livery in 2015

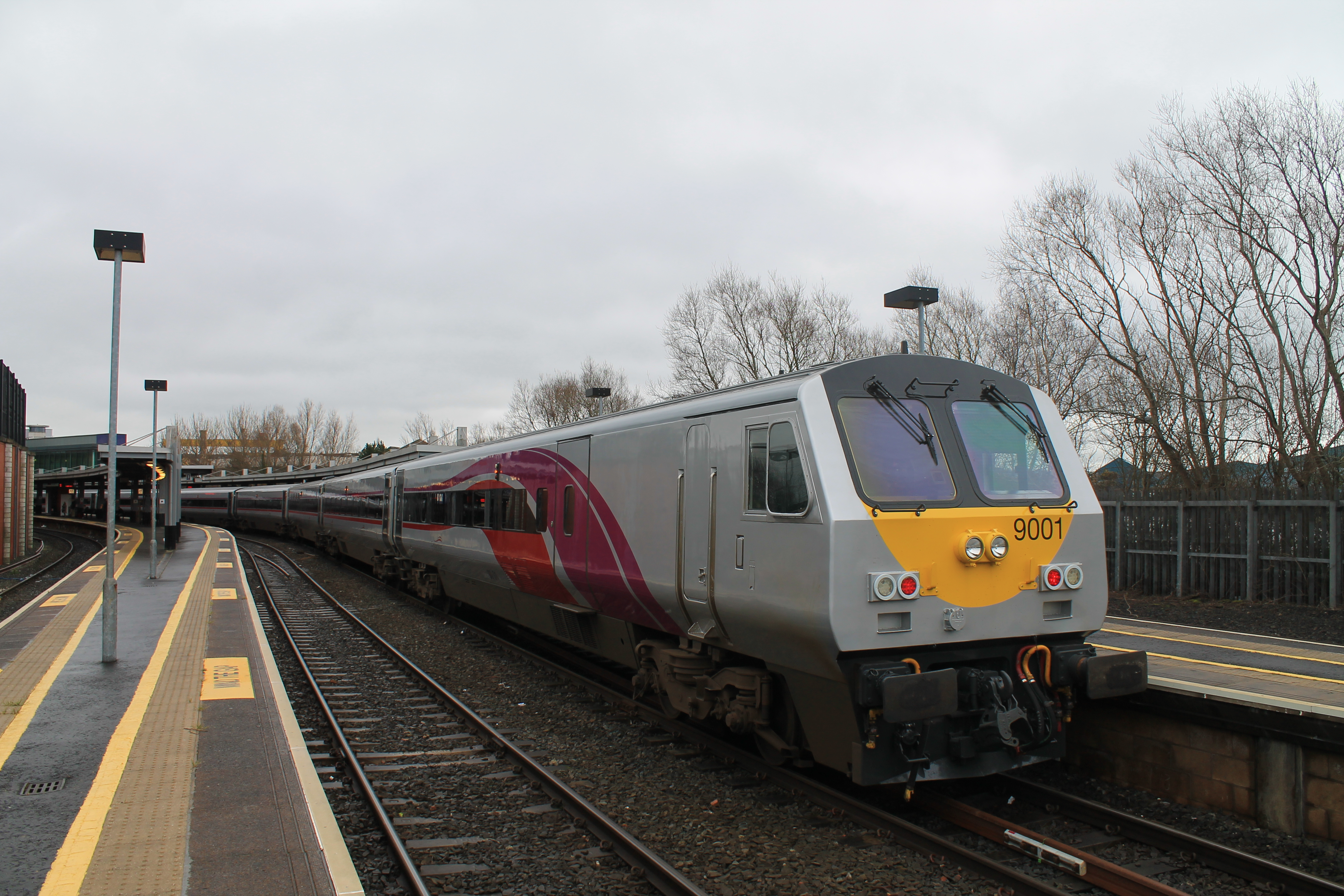
Enterprise DVT No. 9001 at Belfast Central in the new purple livery in 2016

Following the introduction of the new Class 201 locomotives, the jointly operated Enterprise service between Dublin and Belfast was upgraded in September 1997 with new coaching stock from French train makers De Dietrich Ferroviaire (now Alstom DDF). The interiors of the new stock were based on that of the original rolling stock used by Eurostar.

The coaches are divided into two classes: Standard, with 2 + 2 seating and "First Plus", with 2 + 1 seating, individual reading lamps and power adjustable seating with "in seat" audio. All coaches are air conditioned, have powered internal and external doors, tinted windows with adjustable blinds, a single wheelchair accessible toilet with baby changing facilities and electronic information displays.

Until September 2012, electrical power for train HVAC, battery charging and cooking was supplied from the locomotive's Head End Power system as the sets did not include a Generator Van. In order to avoid further damage to the locomotives, four Mark 3 Generator Vans entered service on the date above mentioned.

Although originally ordered as four sets of seven cars, the three in-service sets may comprise eight or nine cars:

- One DVT (No's 9001 to 9004), with Driving Cab, luggage area, 29 "First Plus" seats & wheelchair space, weight 42 tonnes (46.5 tons)
- One "First Plus" (No's 9101 to 9104) with 47 seats, weight 38 t (37 long tons; 42 short tons)
- One Café / Buffet, (No's 9401 to 9404), weight 40 t (39 long tons; 44 short tons)
- One Standard (No's 9213 to 9216) with 68 seats & wheelchair space, weight 38 t (37 long tons; 42 short tons)
- Three or four Standard (No's 9201 to 9212) with 71 seats, weight 38 t (37 long tons; 42 short tons)
- One Generator van (No's 9602, 9604, 9606, 9608)

Each carriage is 23.43 m (76 ft 10 in) long, 3.787 m (12 ft 5.1 in) tall and 2.814 m (9 ft 2.8 in) wide.
The odd numbered vehicles are owned by IÉ and the even numbered by NIR

The trains have a maximum speed of 100 mph (160 km/h), but are limited to 90 mph (140 km/h).

On 12 and 22 December 2009, NIR received the first two, 7608 and 7613, of four Mark 3 Generator vans from IÉ for repainting in Enterprise livery. The other two Generator vans arrived in early 2010. They replaced the HEP power system when they were introduced to revenue service in September 2012, then numbered 5560 89-89604 (9602), 89605 (9604), 89608 (9606) and 89613 (9608).

In 2014, a mid-life refurbishment programme was announced for the Enterprise service. Rotating refurbishment involved substituting non-Enterprise trainsets on an individual basis which began in November 2014 with the return to service of the first revamped coaches in November 2015. Refurbishment provided new mechanical running gear, in coach electronics and modernised interiors. The first refurbished set, consisting of DVT 9002 and Locomotive 206, operated a trial service from York Road Depot in Belfast to Dublin Connolly and back, on 15 October 2015. The same set operated the first official passenger service after its refurbishment on 16 November 2015. The refurbishment was officially completed on 10 April 2016, to coincide with the introduction of an enhanced Enterprise timetable.

==== Mark 3 (2009–present) ====
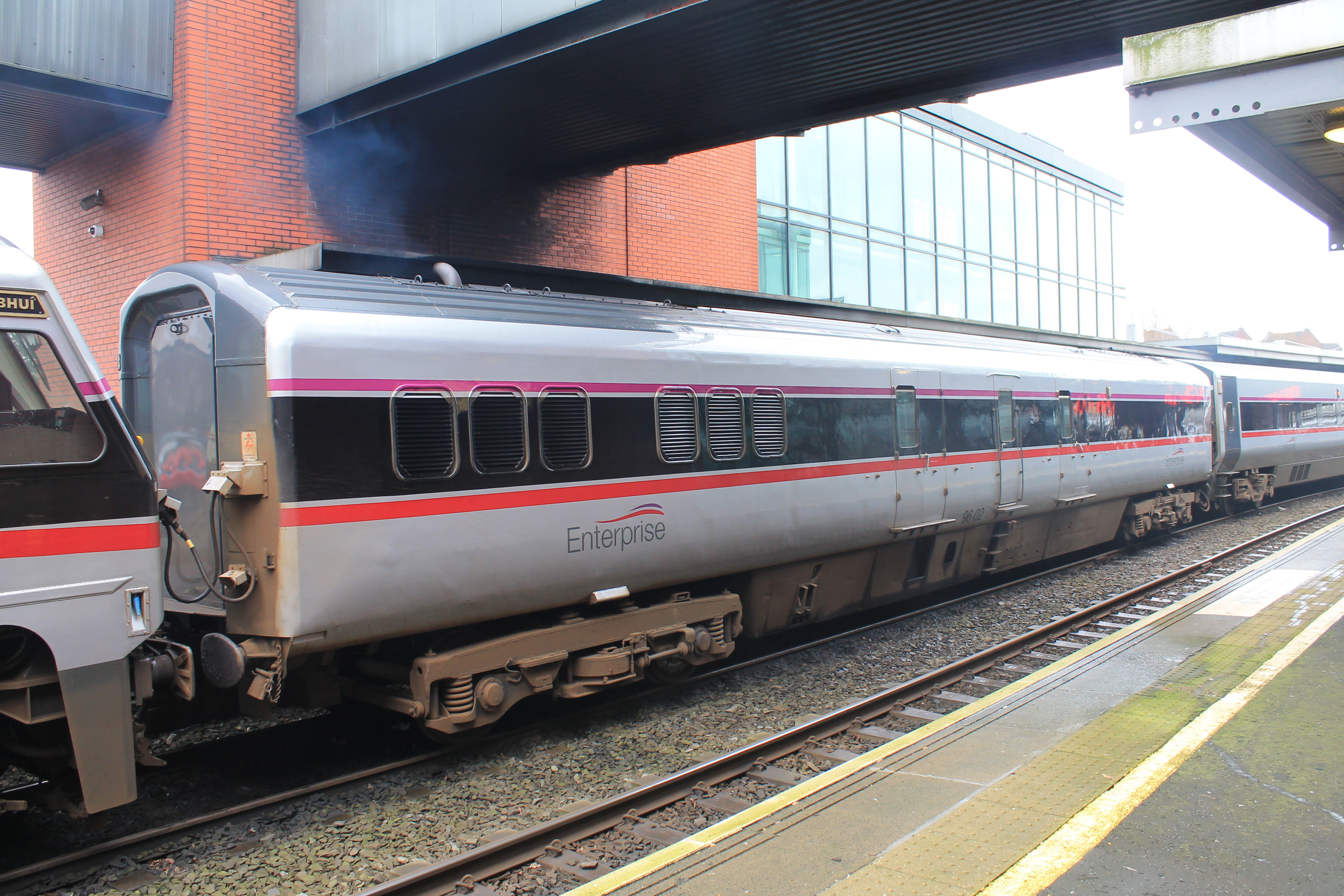
Mark 3 Generator Van in use with Enterprise

Although the majority of the Mark 3 stock was withdrawn by Iarnród Éireann in 2009, a handful of vehicles remain in use. In 2012, following extensive refurbishment, and modification to make them compatible with the existing De Dietrich stock, a total of four Mark 3 generator vans entered service with Enterprise to replace the need for the provision of Head-end power by the 201 Class locomotive.

==== Mark 4 (2006–present) ====
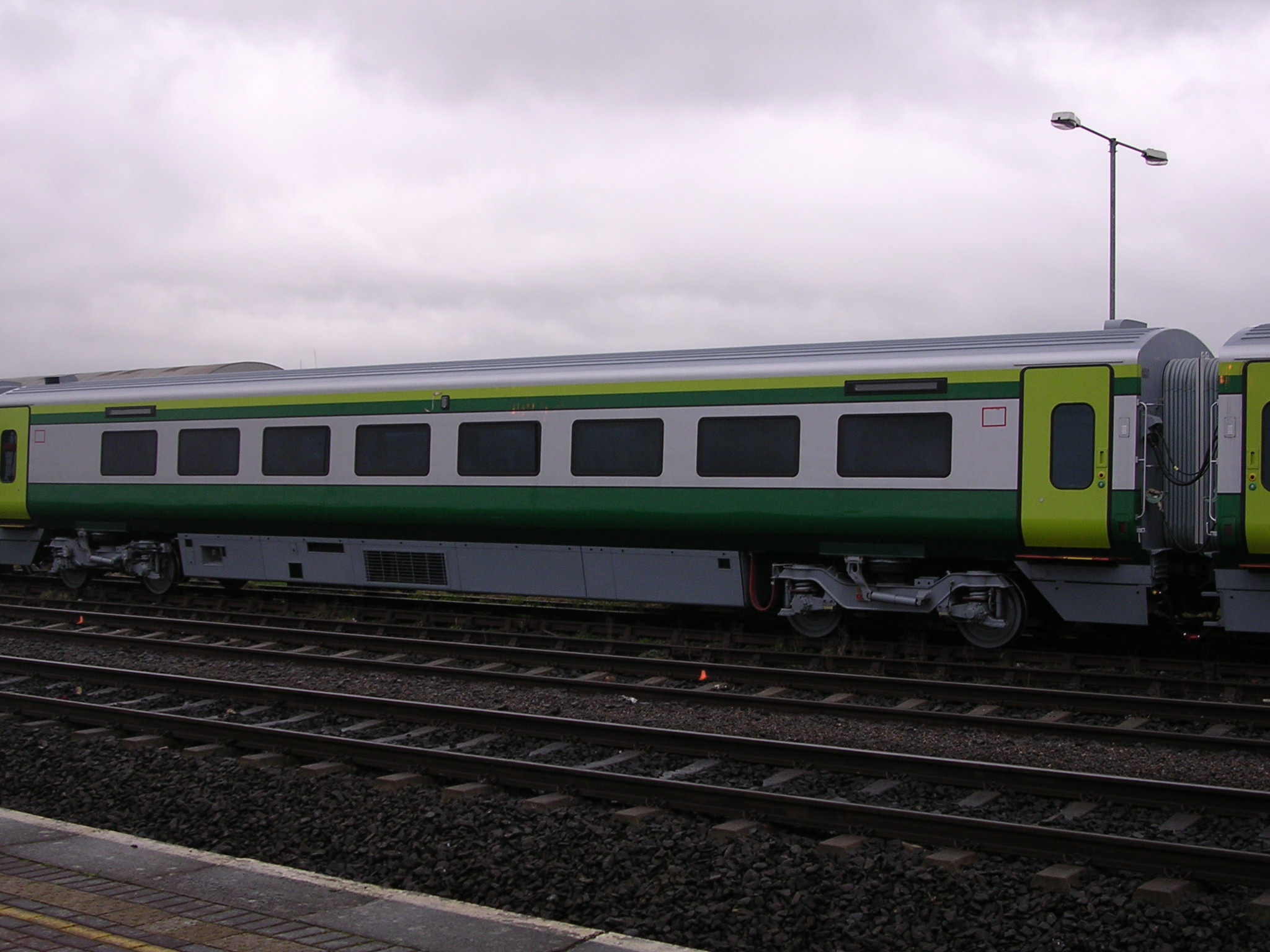
CAF Mark 4 at Limerick Junction, 2006

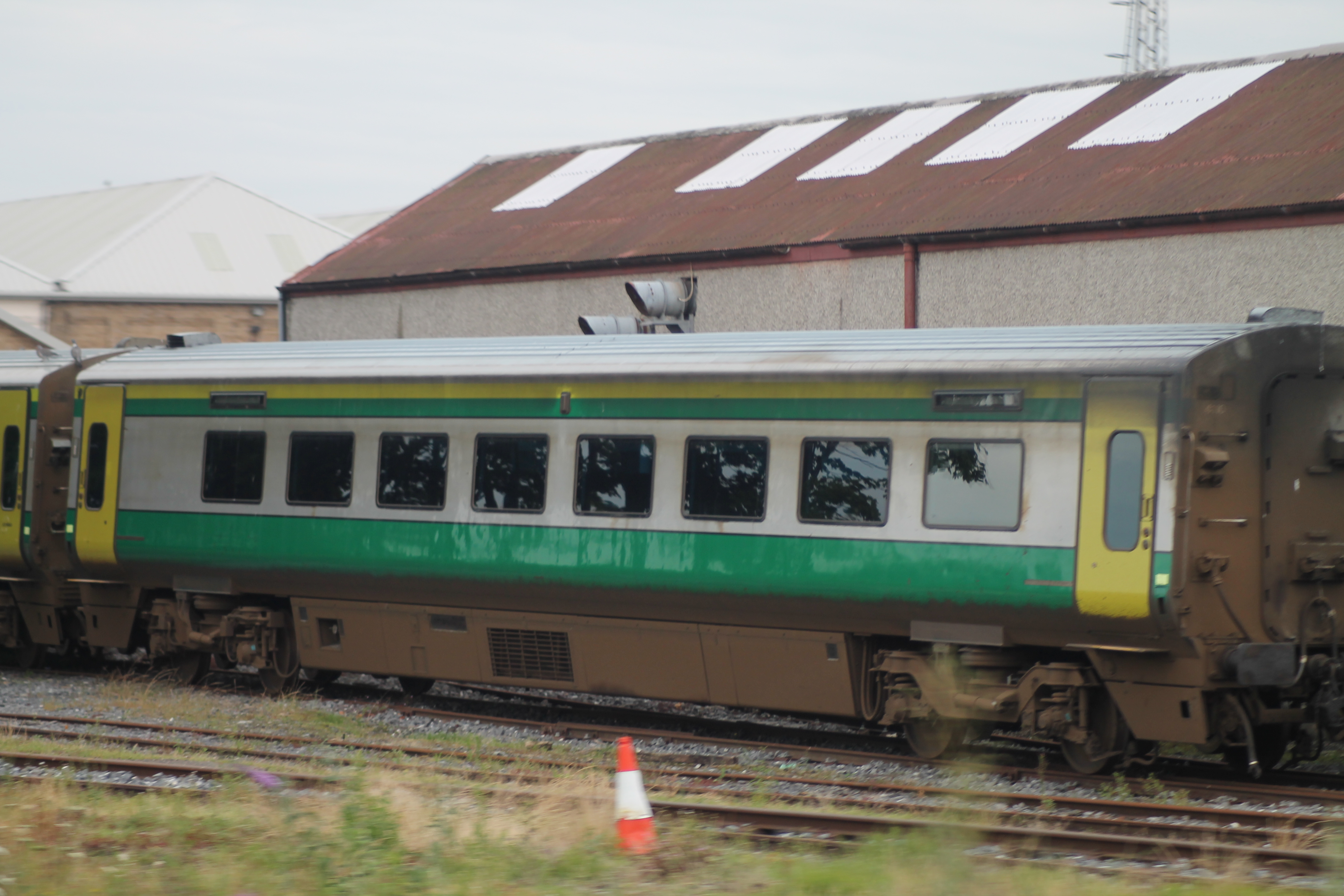
Mark 4 SCE No 4110 at Inchicore, 2014

67 Mark 4 coaches were delivered in 2006 from CAF.

Although the name "Mark 4" has entered common usage, these trains have no connection to the British Rail Mark 4. Though capable of 200 km/h (120 mph) in operation, this higher speed would require both track & signal system upgrade and the provision of a faster locomotive than the currently used 201 class.

A possibility being considered is the replacement of the existing 201 with two power cars, one of which would be converted from the existing Generator Control Car.

Seating capacity is 422 (8-car set) and the train is fully accessible to mobility-impaired customers.

Capable of 10-car operation, each in-service set currently comprises 7 or 8 cars:

- Generator Control Car – GC (4001–4008) (or DVT) (no seating)
- One First Class – FC (4201–4208) (44 seats + 1 wheelchair)
- One Catering Car – CC (4401–4408) (28 seats)
- Four Standard Class – SC (35 in 4101–4143) (69 seats + 1 wheelchair)
- One Standard End – SCE, (8 in 4101–4143, all numbers ending with 5 or 0), with retractable buffers & drop-head buckeye coupling at locomotive end.
- Length between couplers – 23.66 m (77 ft 7 in)
- Height – 3.85 m (12 ft 8 in)
- Width – 2.85 m (9 ft 4 in)

As of 2016, six sets are operated on the Dublin-Cork route's clockface timetable. On some off-peak services smaller 22000 Class sets are used since larger sets are expensive to operate.

Main features

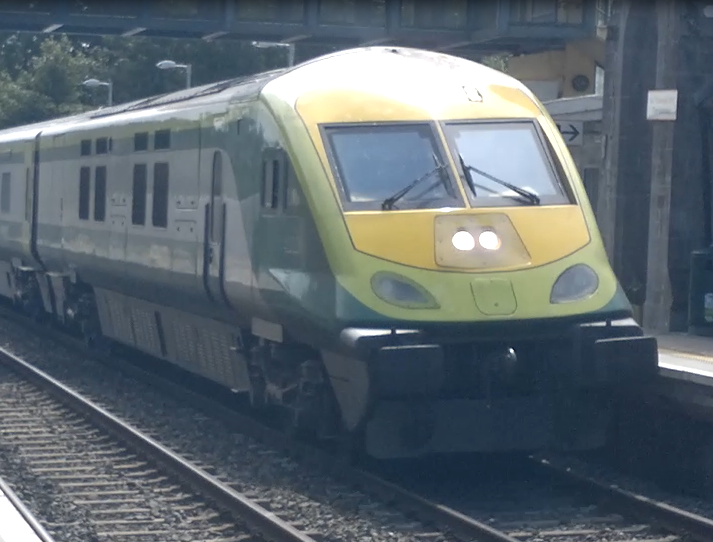
CAF DVT at Templemore, County Tipperary in 2011

- Merak HVAC
- Power operated passenger doors
- Fire resistance to BS 6553:1999 Cat 1B
- Public address (PA) including automated announcements in Irish and English
- Closed-circuit television (CCTV) recording, including a forward-facing camera in the DVT
- LED Exterior & Interior Destination signs
- Seat Reservation system with reserved seating LED displays above each passenger seat. System is updated via Wireless LAN (W-LAN)
- LED Route Maps
- In-seat audio in First Class
- Power operated seating in First Class
- Suspension:
  - Primary coil springs & secondary air bags
- Sanding on leading axle of GC & trailing axle of SCE cars
- Scharfenberg coupler between cars, drop-head buckeye couplers each end
- Wheelchair area & accessible toilets to UK Rail Vehicle Accessibility Regulations

Mark 4 DVT

- Air-conditioned driver's cab
- Fault Diagnostic system, displayed on driver's monitor
- Luggage Compartment
- Fire Suppression System
  - Generator engine compartment protected by FM200 extinguisher
  - Fuel tank protected by AFFF extinguisher
- Generators:
  - Twin MAN 2846 LE 202 (320 kW (430 hp)) / Letag (330 kVA) engine / generator sets, assembled by GESAN
- Length between couplers – 23.81 m (78 ft 1 in)

=== Former stock ===
==== Laminate (1955–1984) ====
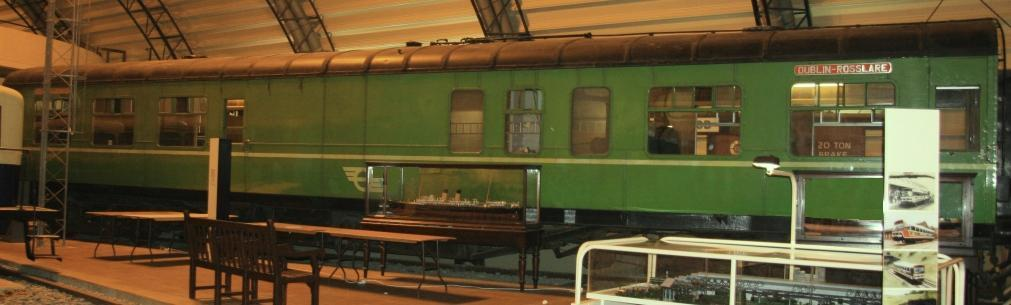
Laminate Buffet 2422TL at Cultra, 2008. Length: 61 ft 6 in (18.75 m) Width: 9 ft 11.25 in (3.03 m) Weight: 30 long tons (30.5 t; 33.6 short tons) Fitted with Commonwealth bogies, 2422TL was introduced in 1956 (Number series 2419–2422)

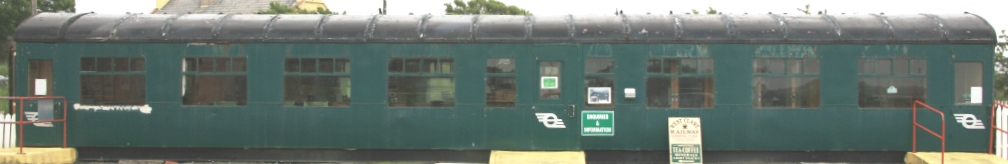
Bredin Designed Coach (1930s) at Moyasta Junction, Co.Clare, 2008 (Built by GSR, pre-CIE)

The older CIÉ stock comprised a variety of designs, built to two distinct profiles. The carriages built in the early 1950s had a narrower, more vertical profile with a small tumblehome similar to that used by Edgar Bredin of the Great Southern Railways for its steel panelled coaches. The carriages built from the end of the 1950s had a wider profile with a more pronounced tumblehome. Like the "Bredins", they were wooden framed and steel panelled.

The earlier coaches included the last compartment stock built by CIÉ, both standard and composite first/standard designs. Typically there were 7 compartments per carriage with each having seating for 6 passengers in first class and 8 passengers in standard. In the open saloon designs, as well as the compartment designs, seats were aligned to windows and so passengers could enjoy an unobstructed view out of the train from all seats unlike the airline style seat arrangement in some more recent designs.

Carriages of this design built after 1955 were referred to as "laminates" due to the use of laminated wooden uprights and roof members, as opposed to solid wood. Otherwise, construction details were the same. Dining cars continued to be built with solid wood frames, but were often incorrectly termed "laminates" as they were the same design and era.

Some of the "Laminate" carriages were later converted to steam heating vans to allow the four-wheel and six-wheel heating vans to be withdrawn in the late 1970s and early 1980s. All of CIÉ's restaurant cars prior to the Mark 2 stock were of the vertical profile design. A brake standard design was adapted as a driving trailer for use on one of CIÉ's branch lines.

There were three varieties of the later wide body profile coaches:

- A composite (all later converted to brake standards)
- A standard open design with two lavatories at one end
- A standard open design with a single lavatory at each end

Although designed for long-distance operation, the "Laminate" stock was extensively redeployed on Dublin and Cork suburban services in the 1970s and 1980s as newer rolling stock became available. This was not ideal due to the layout of the carriages and limited door openings, which resulted in longer dwell times at stations. Following the Buttevant crash in 1980, the "Laminate" and Park Royal stock was restricted to a 70 mph (110 km/h) top speed and later banned from certain routes.

After the electrification of the Howth-Bray route in 1984 and the introduction of Mark 3 stock, the "Laminate" stock was progressively withdrawn. Some have been preserved at various locations around Ireland:

- Downpatrick and County Down Railway has Buffet Car 2419 and Brake Standard 1918TL (originally 2163).
- Kiltamagh Museum has Standard Open 1460 and Composite 2148
- The Railway Preservation Society of Ireland in Dublin has Standard 1463 The RPSI also owns Buffet Car 2422TL, which was formerly on display at the Ulster Folk and Transport Museum, but has since moved to their Whitehead base.
- Sligo Folk Park in Riverstown has Standard Open 1468
- The Connemara Railway in Maam Cross has Bar Car 2421 and Brake 3rd 1916, formerly owned by the RPSI.

==== Park Royal (1955–1994) ====
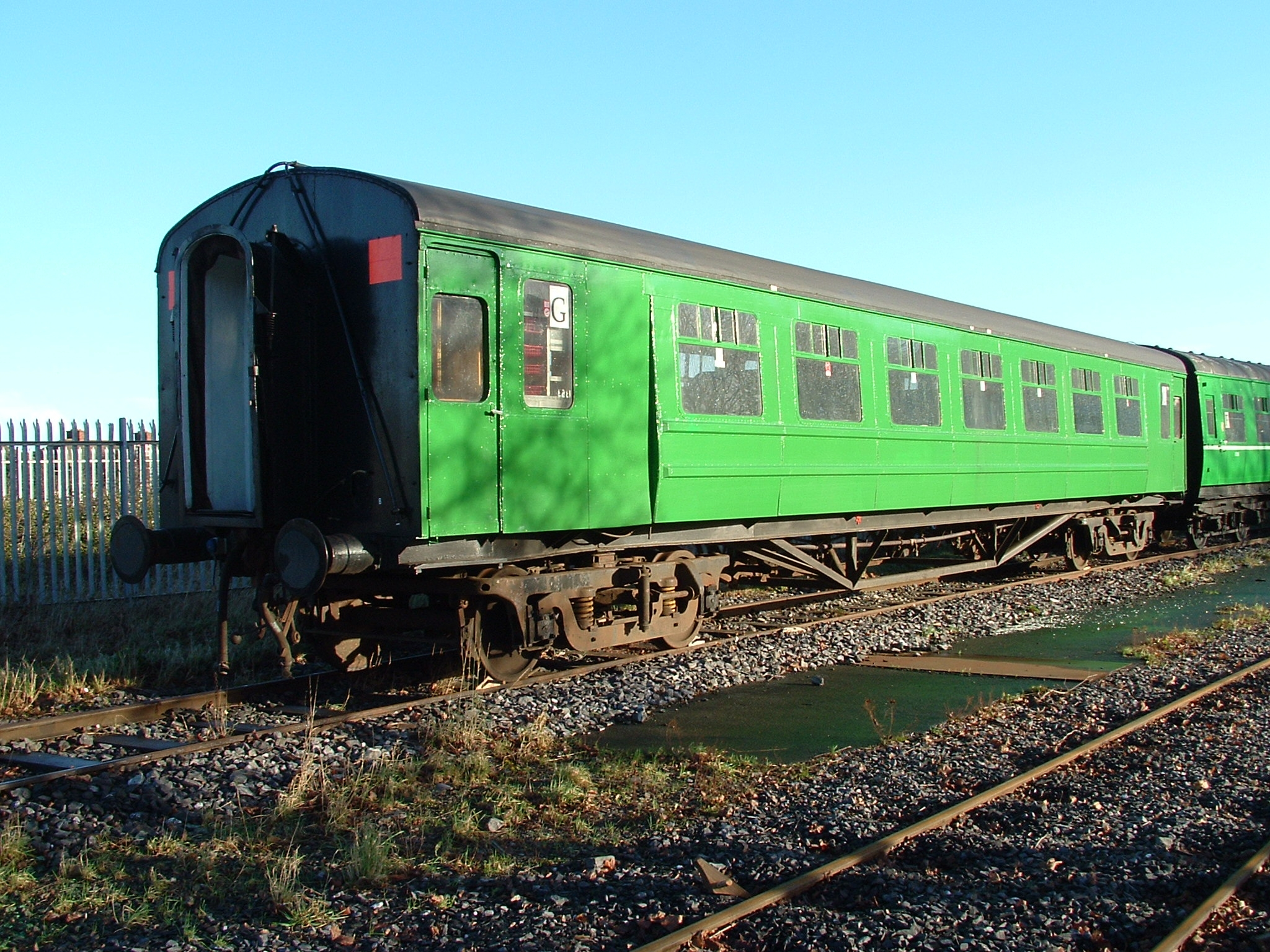
Park Royal at Inchicore, 2005

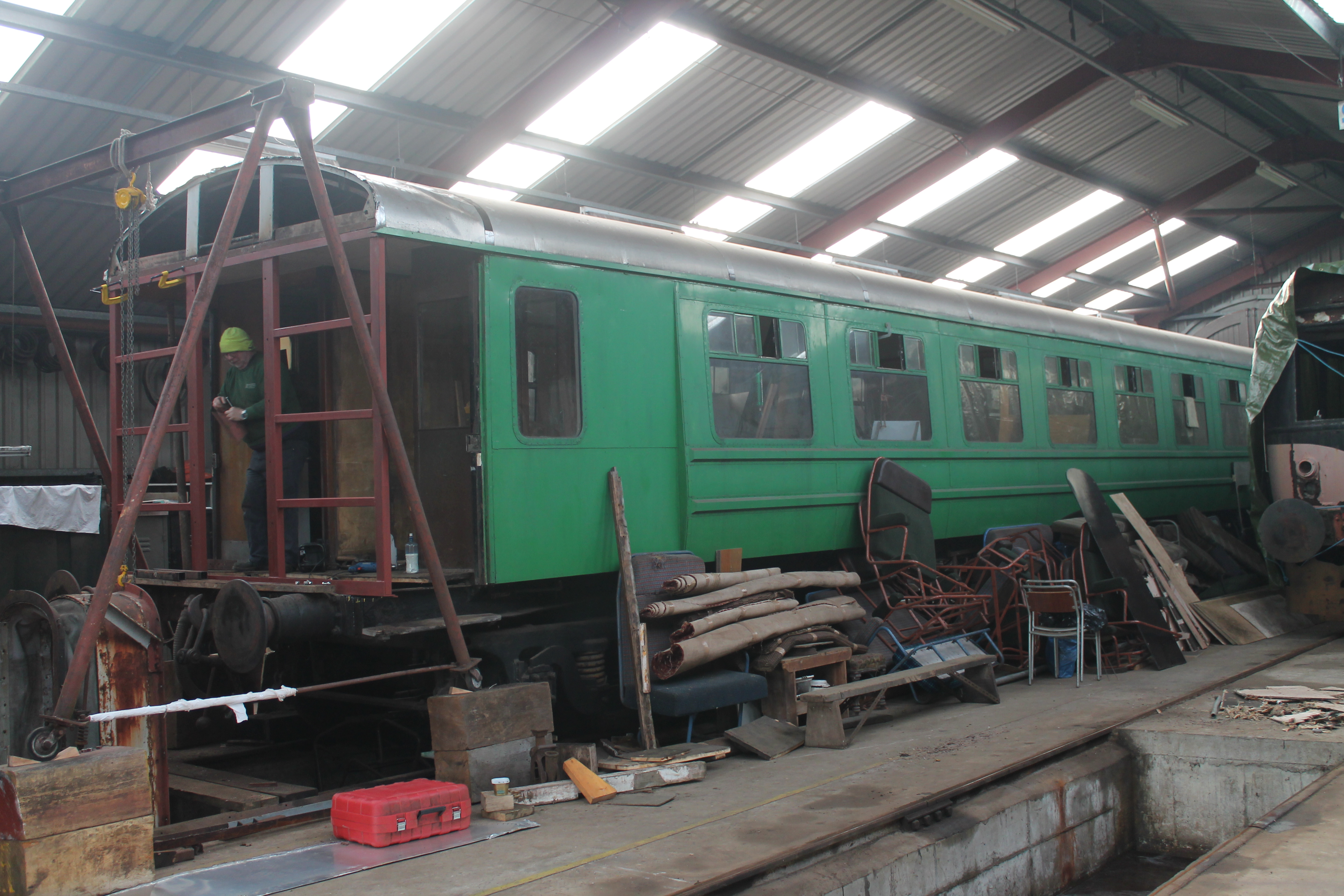
Park Royal No. 1944 Undergoing restoration at Downpatrick in 2015

In 1955 Inchicore Works commenced the construction of 50 coaches from parts supplied by Park Royal Vehicles, London. These coaches were produced in Main Line or Suburban variants, and made full use of the Irish loading gauge, being 61 ft 6 in (18.75 m) long and 10 ft 2 in (3.10 m) wide, narrowing by 8 in (200 mm) at their ends.

Because of their aluminium and steel construction, they weighed only 26 long tons (26.4 t) tare (Suburban) and approx. 27.25 long tons (27.69 t) tare (Main Line). Unusually, these coaches had inward opening doors, similar to the American "Pullman" design, but this proved unpopular and somewhat confusing to the passengers and so were rebuilt conventionally. The suburban coach seated 82, while the main line coach, fitted with lavatories, seated 70 passengers. These coaches rode on Commonwealth bogies, the first in Ireland to be so fitted.

Barred from certain routes during the early 1990s because of their construction, the last few Park Royal carriages were withdrawn following the delivery of the first Japanese 2600 Class DMUs in 1994.

There are several preserved examples;

- The RPSI has two, two Open 3rds, Nos.1383 and 1419. No. 1383 is fitted with a shop, whilst No.1419 has been modified so as to be wheelchair compatible.
- No.1944 has been fully restored at the Downpatrick & Co. Down Railway and is now part of the passenger running set
- Nos. 1400 and 1424 are displayed at the Clonakilty Model Village

Livery

When built, these coaches received the standard CIÉ "ivy – leaf" green livery. In the early 1960s, they were re-painted in the new black, orange, and white colour scheme.

==== Cravens (1963–2006) ====
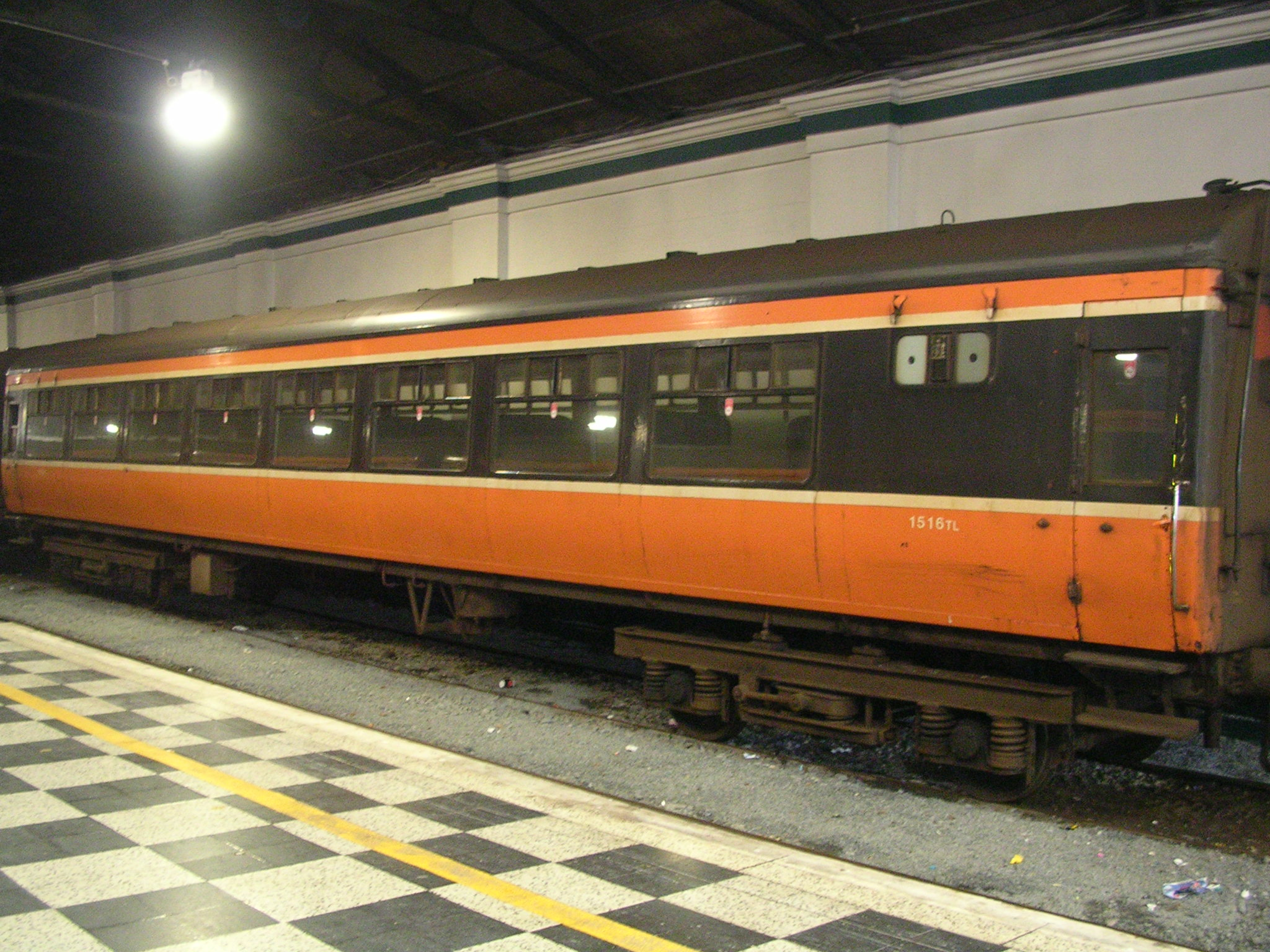
1516 in Colbert Station, 2006

No. 1520 being scrapped

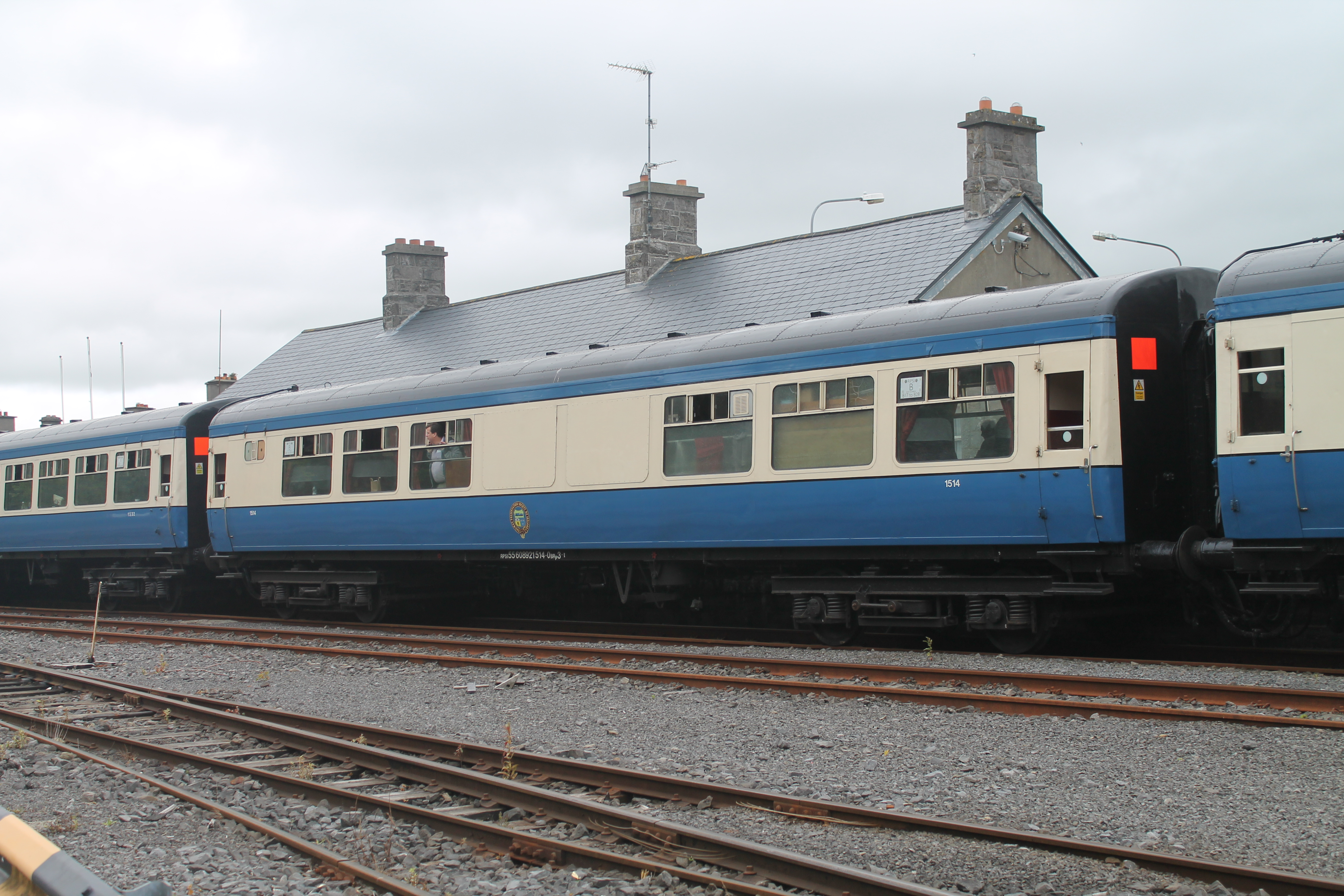
Bar car No. 1514 at Ballina in 2015, carrying the RPSI's new blue and cream livery

In spring 1961, CIÉ sought tenders for the supply of 40 new Standard Class coaches, 10 to be delivered complete, the rest "part-finished" for assembly in Inchicore with technical assistance from the suppliers. The £500,000 contract was awarded to Cravens of Sheffield. It was reported that these new vehicles "would set a pattern for future construction of CIÉ carriage stock." The first of the Sheffield-built coaches was unloaded at the North Wall, Dublin on 3 May 1963 and taken to Inchicore for acceptance.

These coaches were built with light alloy bodies on steel underframes on Type B4 bogies.
Each saloon had 64 seats, arranged in eight bays of four around a table, either side of a central gangway, with two toilets situated in the vestibule at one end. The interior was finished in laminated plastics, creating a light and airy feel. They were fitted with a public address system, double-glazed windows and central fluorescent lighting along their length, the first coaches in Ireland to be so treated. Heating was by steam, supplied from a Steam Heating Van.
They were 62 ft 8 in (19.10 m) long, 9 ft 6 in (2.90 m) wide, 12 ft 7.5 in (3.848 m) high, weighed 28.7 long tons (29.2 t). and were numbered 1504 to 1513. The 30 incomplete coaches were numbered 1514–1543, and although the total order was for 70, only 15 more (numbered 1544–1558) were built to a total of 55.

During early 1963, Inchicore commenced construction of two new First Class coaches in a style similar to, but not connected with, the Craven contract. These coaches were built with an open plan format, double-glazing and air conditioning. Numbered 1145 and 1146, they were the only post-war all-first class coaches to be added to the stock, their immediate predecessor, 1144, was built in 1935.

On 2 April 1964 the new coaches were demonstrated to the press and entered service on 10 April, working the 18.30 Dublin to Cork train. They were common on high capacity specials, with 14 vehicle trains (12 "Cravens" + 2 Gen Vans) not being atypical, with a capacity of 768 passengers.

Prior to their displacement on these services by railcars, right into the 2000s the Cravens could be found on outer suburban workings, such as those from Dublin to Arklow and Longford. They could also be found on rural services such as those on the Rosslare-Waterford-Limerick route and the Mallow to Tralee line.

Throughout 2006 a phased withdrawal of the Craven stock took place. Their final regular duties were "Fridays Only" workings from Dublin Heuston to Cork, Galway, Limerick and Tralee and their return. They were also occasionally used for rugby union and football match specials and other one-off services.

The final set in scheduled service was withdrawn on 11 December 2006 after working the 05:15 Athlone – Dublin Heuston service. The last operation in IÉ ownership was carriage No.1510 on an RPSI steam special on 17 December. Craven Carriage Numbers 1505, 1506, 1508, 1514, 1522, 1523, 1529, 1532, 1539, and 1541 have been preserved in regular use by the Railway Preservation Society of Ireland (RPSI), along with two BR mk1 generator vans, Nos.3173 and 3185. A "Dutch" type generator van, no.3158 that would have operated with the Cravens stock, has also been preserved by the RPSI, and now runs with their Whitehead based mk2 set as No.462.

Livery The Sheffield built coaches were outshopped and delivered in the new CIÉ livery of tan below the waist, black on the central panel at window level, roof and ends, with a 6 in (150 mm) white band between the upper window and roof. Large, white, class numerals were applied to the doors. The two Inchicore First Class coaches were similarly treated. In the very late 1980s and early 90s, a thin white band about 1 in (25 mm) was applied to the waistband, separating the tan and black sections. Following the re-branding to Irish Rail in 1988, two 3 in (76 mm) white vinyl strips were added, separating the black from the tan above and below it. Two 12 in (300 mm) reflective Fluorescent Red 3M Scotchcal square panels were applied at each body end.

In preservation the Craven coaches had to be given a paint scheme that was different to the IÉ colours of orange and black, which at the time was still in use on Irish Rail's Mark 2 and Mark 3 fleets, to avoid confusing passengers. The first 2 Cravens, 1529 and 1539, had a green colour applied between the windows and the bogies, whilst 1541 ran for one trip in a grey undercoat before returning to Inchicore to be repainted by volunteers into a new allover blue livery with a yellow stripe below the window. A yellow box stripe and the RPSI crest on the side were also added. While this was progressing, all RPSI Cravens had the letters "RPSI" in white applied to the doors on both sides to identify them in both Inchicore and on the rail network. Two more Cravens received the allover blue treatment before Iarnród Éireann took over the repainting of the carriages in 2014. Today, all the Cravens except for 1539 have been outshopped in a new RPSI livery of blue and cream, complete with two RPSI crests on the side of each carriage. It can be noted that snack bar carriage No. 1508 is the only carriage in the set that has been repainted into the new colour scheme by the RPSI Dublin carriage crew, as she was being extensively rebuilt and repaired by the team, who wanted to do the full job themselves.

==== Mark 2 (1972–2008) ====
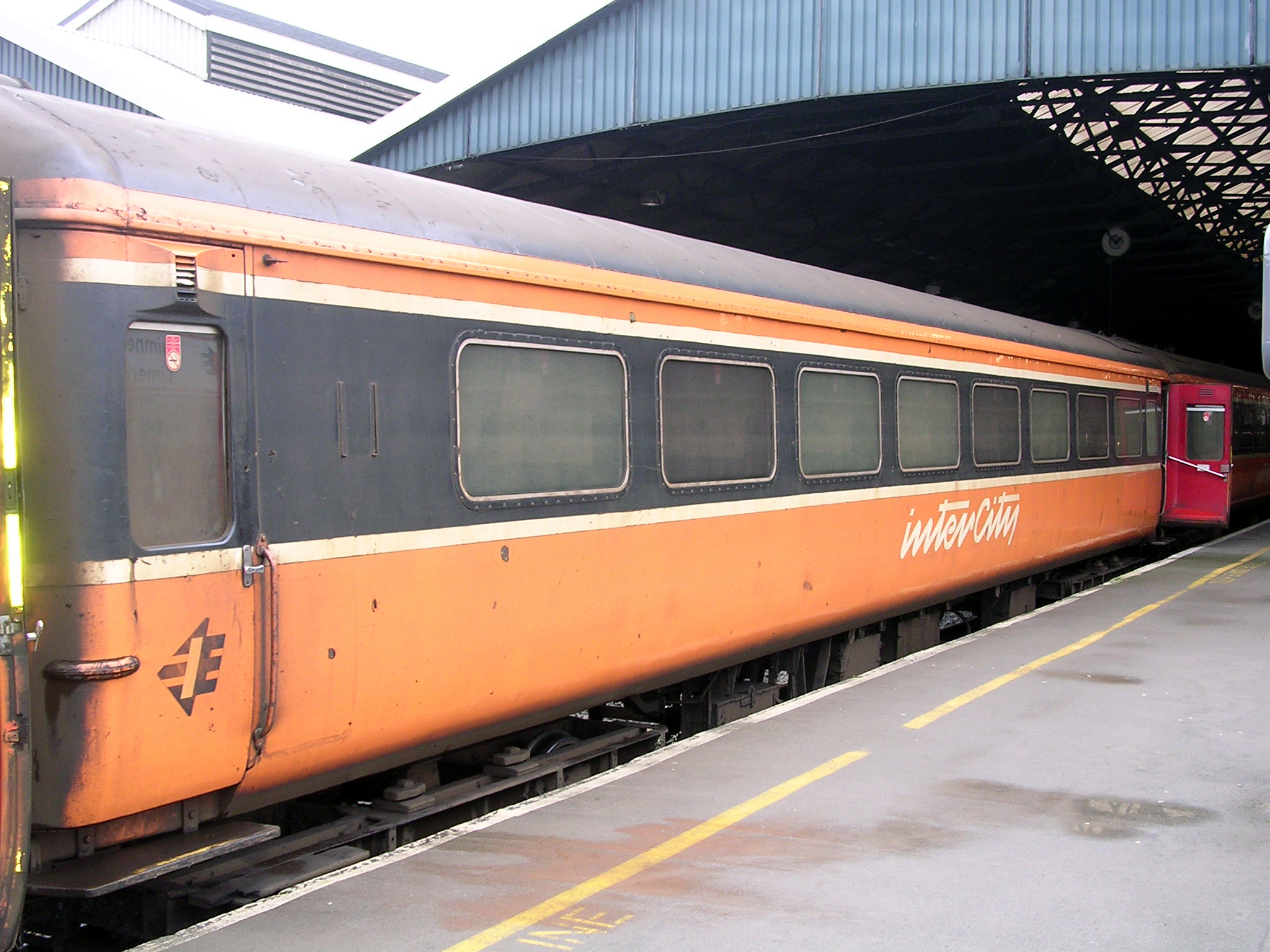
Mark 2 in Colbert Station, 2006

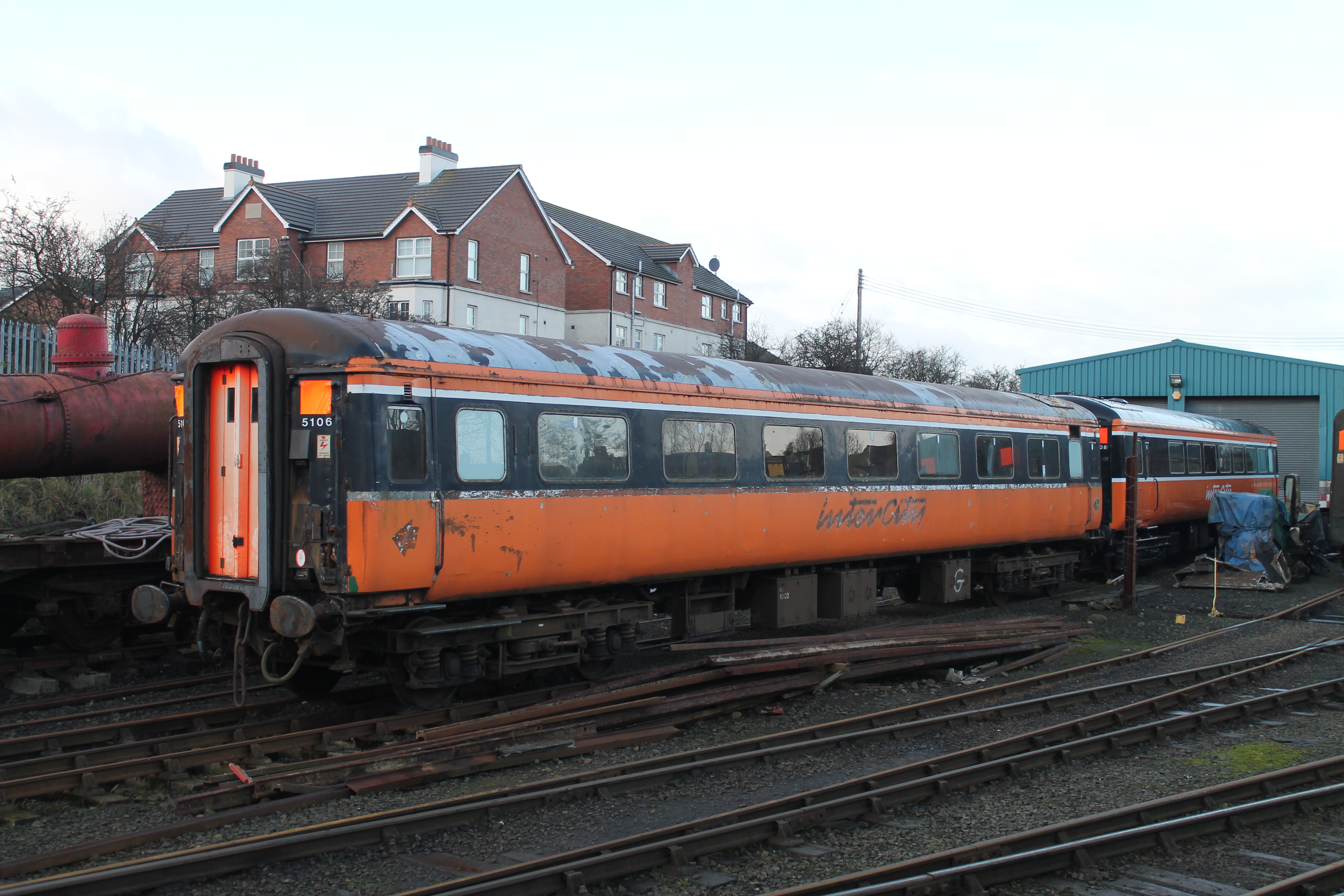
Irish Rail MkII's at Whitehead, 2014

Mark 2D In 1972 CIÉ placed an order with British Rail Engineering Limited (BREL) for 72 new coaches based on the British Rail Mark 2d design. These were built at Derby Litchurch Lane Works. With air conditioning as a principal feature they became known as "AC Stock" and ran on type B4 bogies, with vacuum brakes.

The order consisted of 6 First Class coaches (5101 to 5106), 9 Composites (5151–5159), 36 Standard Class (5201–5236), 11 Restaurant / Buffet / Standard Class (5401–5411) and 11 Generator Vans (5601–5611). Internal fit-out was done in Inchicore, and was quite different from the original BR design, using bench seating rather than individual seats and made extensive use of wood veneer panelling.

Their electrical system also differed from the BR and NIR versions. The Generator Van contained two engine / generator sets, each supplying 220 / 380 Volts 50 Hz AC to two separate "busses" in the train. The air conditioning loads were divided in half, each half fed from each "bus". In the case of failure of one generator set, the other set automatically supplies both "busses". Air conditioning output power would then be halved, but all other loads including Cooking, Lighting and Battery Charging continue to be supplied. This has remained the model for the electrical power supply on all subsequent IE coaches.

To accommodate changes in traffic, five of the Composites, 5153–5156 and 5158 were re-classed as "Standards", while one of the Restaurant / Buffet / Standards, 5408, was converted for use as the Presidential Coach.

The remaining Mark 2 carriages were gradually phased out during 2007 and 2008, with the last remaining set operating its final service, the 05:05 Athlone – Heuston, on 31 March 2008. Two of these vehicles (Nos. 5106 and 5203) have been preserved by the RPSI and were moved to their Whitehead base in the first quarter of 2008. They were renumbered 303 and 304 respectively, and repainted in RPSI dark green livery. In addition, the Presidential coach No. 5408 is stored by RPSI, still owned by Irish Rail. This vehicle was transported to the RPSI base in Whitehead in 2014.

Mark 2AB In addition to the vacuum-braked Mark 2D fleet, a second fleet of Mark 2 coaches was used by Irish Rail. These were second hand air-braked Mark 2 coaches acquired in 19s. They were numbered in the 41XX series for standards, or 44XX series for catering vehicles. These coaches were withdrawn around 2003 following the deployment of Class 29000 railcar sets into service. Four of these vehicles have been preserved. 4106 can be found at Kilmeaden station on the Waterford and Suir Valley Railway, 4402 is preserved at Moyasta Junction on the West Clare Railway. Three "Dutch" type generator vans were converted to airbraking to work with these carriages, re-numbered 4601–4603. One of these, No.4602, is preserved by the Railway Preservation Society of Ireland at Whitehead.

==== Mark 3 (1984–2009) ====
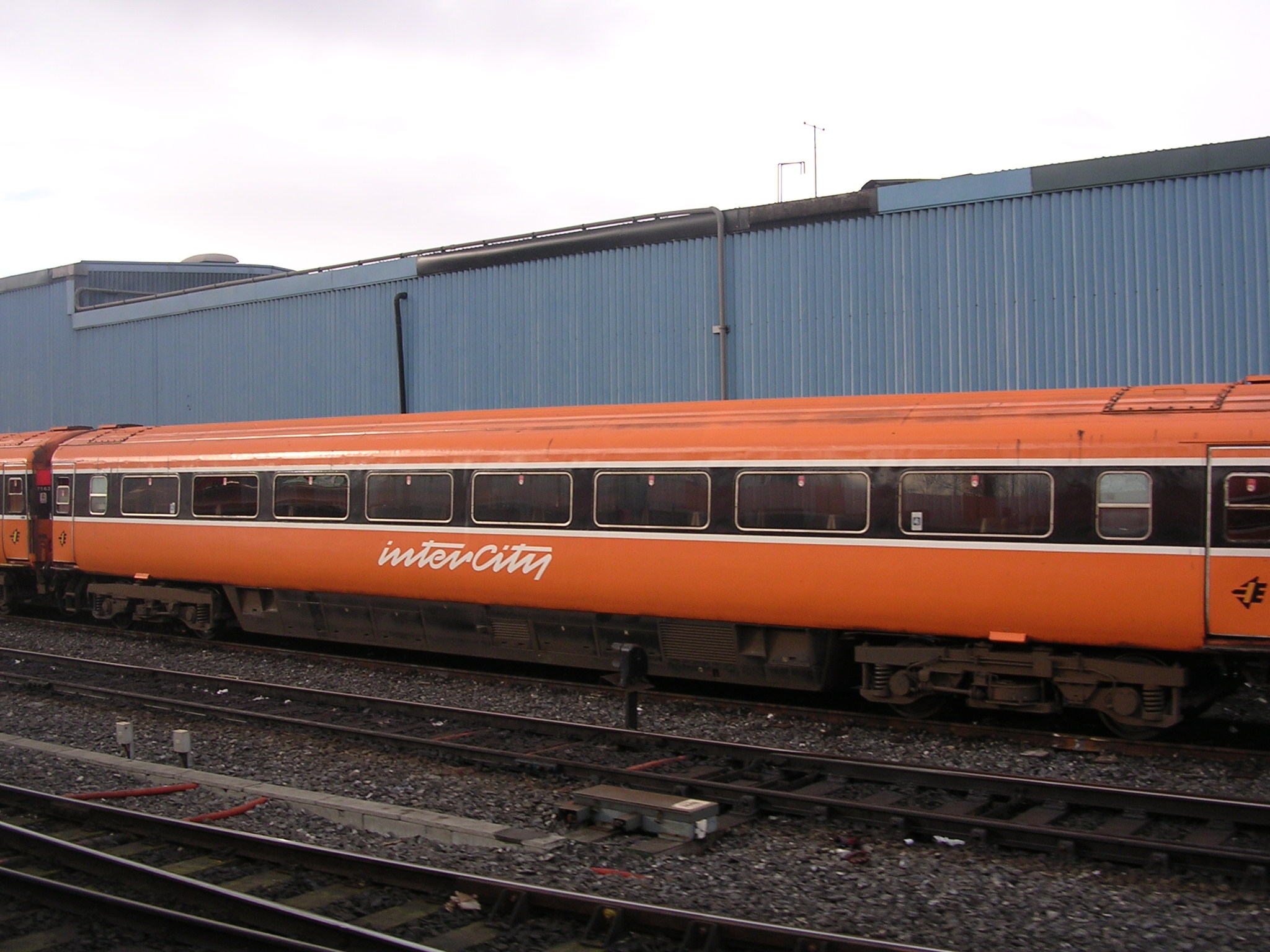
Mark 3 in Heuston Station, 2006

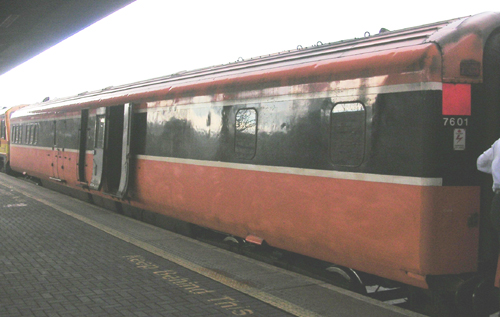
Mark 3 Generator Van in Heuston Station, 2006

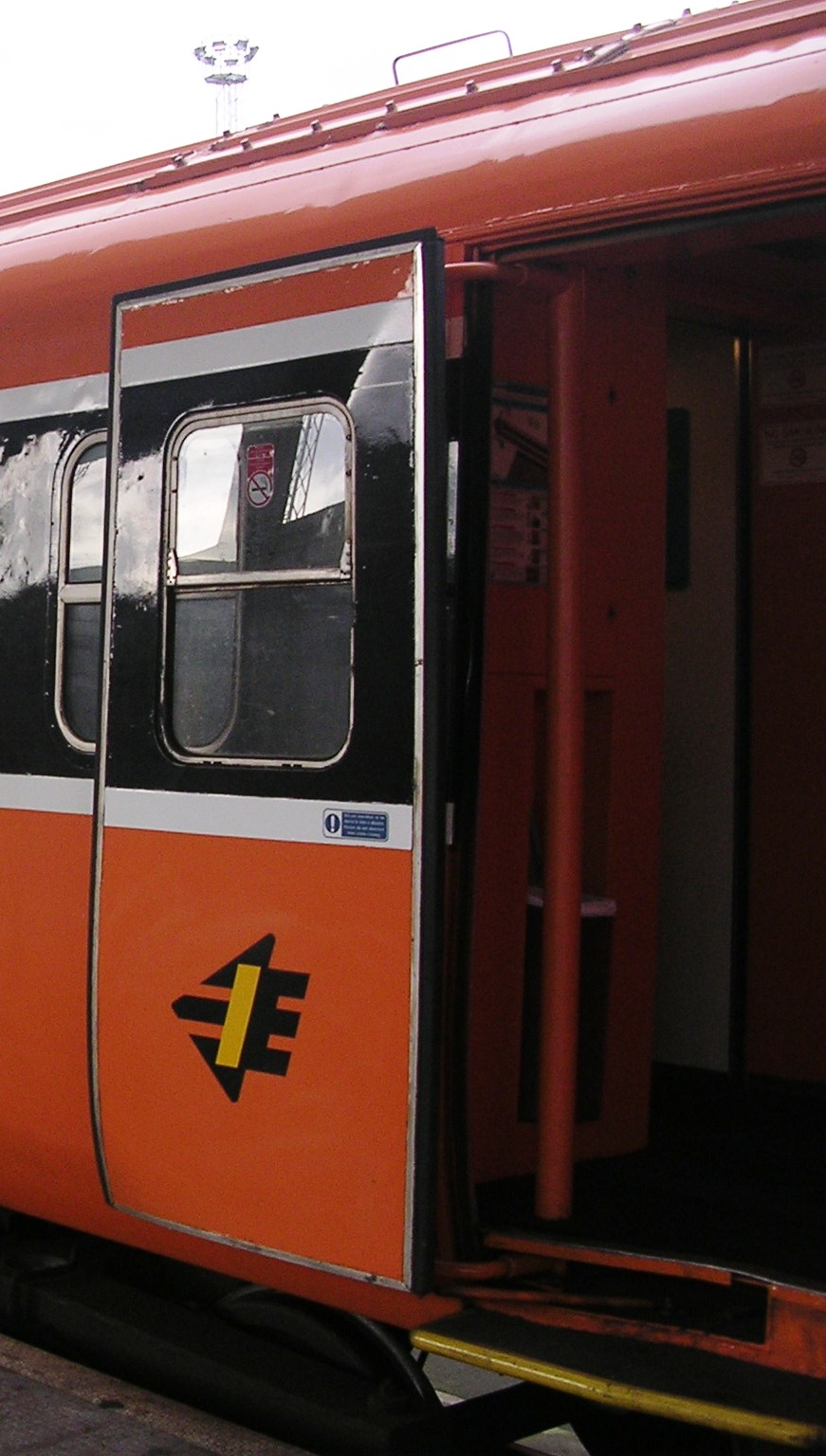
Mark 3 automatic door

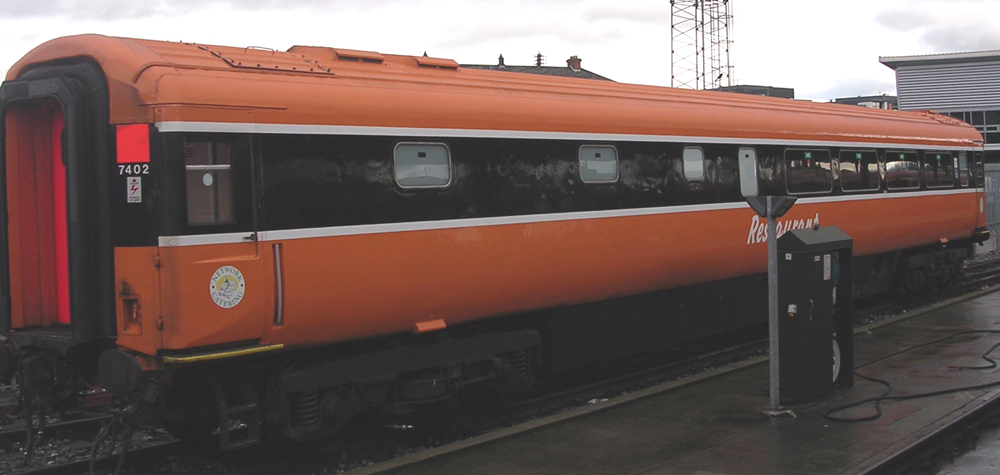
Mark 3 Dining Car

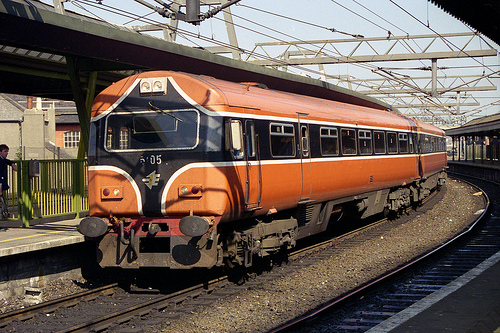
A mark 3 Control Car at Dublin Connolly

Introduced on the CIÉ system in 1984 the last set was withdrawn on Monday 28 September 2009. The decision to purchase a new fleet of modern Intercity coaches based on the British Rail Mark 3 design was made because of several accidents involving the older style, wooden framed, coaches. They were already a well-proven design used for British Rail's High Speed Train (HST).

The first 44 Open Standards (7101–44) and five Buffets (7401–05) and seven Generator Vans (7601–07) were built at Derby Litchurch Lane Works. The remainder (7145–72, 7406–13, 7608–15) were built under licence in Inchicore between 1984 and 1989. The coaches ran on 5 ft 3 in gauge versions of British Rail's BT22 Air Suspension bogie, and were air-braked.

The Irish Mark 3 coaches were similar, but not identical, to their British counterparts. They had a different electrical system (220/380V, 50 Hz) and were the first Mark 3's to be fitted with automatic swing-plug doors. There were also some different internal layouts more specifically suited to Irish traffic.

Twenty-four coaches were built for push-pull operation on the suburban rail service including five built to Control Cars (6101–05, 6301–19). Originally introduced in 1989 in conjunction with the 121 Class locomotives they were last used with 201 Class locomotives. There were a number of differences between the Irish push-pull Mark 3's and the standard Mark 3's. An underfloor generator, mounted in the Control Car, provided electrical power to the coaches; unlike on the standard Mark 3's, which used a special generator van. This single generator was not as powerful as the two used in the Mark 3 generator vans and was the main reason the sets were limited to 6 cars. Irish Mark 3 push-pull based rolling stock did not have air conditioning and had opening windows instead. There was also a 70 mph speed restriction imposed on the train due to the fact that three of the Control Cars were fitted with LHB bogies from an 8100 Class DART and were air-braked.

In 2004, a 1979 vintage British Rail Mark 3 TRFK (Trailer Restaurant First Kitchen) coach was converted by Interfleet into a modern Snack Car for use on a Push-pull set. This set was usually used on the Waterford route.

The Mark 3A "Cú Na Mara" set, now withdrawn, operated exclusively on the Dublin to Galway route, and was originally the BREL International Train, a showcase project designed to secure overseas orders. The set travelled to a German rail exhibition in 1988, but returned without any new orders and languished for some years before being sold on through Vic Berry. IÉ converted the many different interior layouts to their own standard design (6201–08 ex 99521–22/24–29, Restaurant Buffet 6401 ex 99523), fitted their own Mark 3 type powered door and re-bogied with ABB bogies. Although also re-wired for Push-Pull operation the fact that an additional coach wasn't converted to a Driving Brake Standard (planned 6501 ex 99520) prevented the set from ever running with this configuration. This set last ran on 14 April 2008, working the 09:15 Galway to Heuston service, hauled by 201 Class No. 205.

This set marked the end of coach building in Inchicore.

The plug door design found on the CIÉ Mark 3 coaches was later used on the British Rail Class 442 long-distance commuter train.

In 2008, IÉ announced plans to sell off the Mark 3 fleet. and having failed to so do they announced plans to scrap most of them 4 years later in 2012.

All remaining Mark 3 sets were withdrawn from service on 21 September 2009, the final service being a 13:45 Dublin-Cork relief train. However, one set was brought back for a charity event for enthusiasts on 24 April 2010. This tour also formed the 12:40 Limerick – Ennis service train, making this the last passenger service operated by a Mark 3 set.

Two Mark 3 sets were stored at Dundalk post withdrawal and it was reported that their bodies were in such a bad state that they could not be brought to Dublin to be scrapped. Since the poor condition of the coaches precluded their transferral to Dublin for scrap, they were scrapped where they stood in Dundalk yard on 10 February 2014.

Four of the Mark 3 control cars were scrapped except 6105 which is stabled at the West Clare Railway Museum.

The Mark 3's had a maximum speed of 100 mph and could run at this speed on the Cork Main Line if a 201 Class was hauling them.

On 12 December 2009, locomotive 144 brought an ex-Mark 3 Generator van (7608) from Dublin to York Road Depot, Belfast. Then again on 22 December 2009, locomotive 8209 brought another ex-Mark 3 Generator van (7613) from Dublin to York Road. NIR received a total of four ex-Mark 3 Generator vans. They have been painted in Enterprise colours and wired with push/pull to run with the Enterprise sets to replace the HEP supplied by the locomotive. These Generator vans entered service in September 2012.

Scrapping of the Mark 3 coaches began in Inchicore Works during September 2013.

Throughout July 2014 the remaining Mark 3's in North Wall were taken to Adelaide Yard in Belfast where they were cut in half and transported to Hamills scrap yard in Ahoghill.

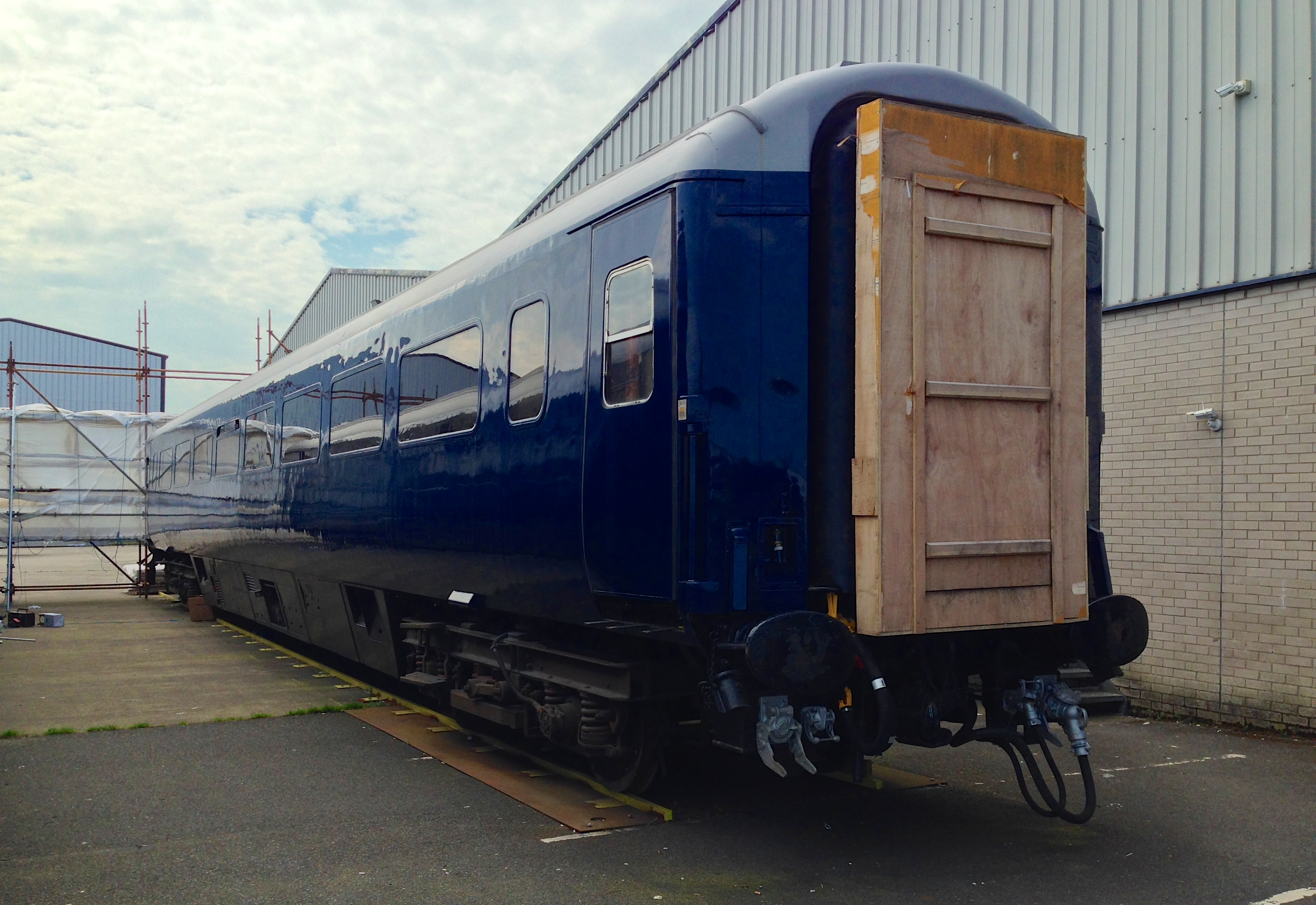
Mark 3 Grand Hibernian vehicle during refurbishment

In 2014, Belmond, the owners of Venice-Simplon Orient Express, announced plans for a new Irish luxury train named as Belmond Grand Hibernian. To operate this service, Belmond procured eleven Mark 3 coaches from Iarnród Éireann for conversion into sleeping, restaurant and parlour cars.

Between August 2016 and 2020, 10 of the Mark 3 carriages owned by Belmond are in service, painted in a dark blue livery. The 11th carriage, still in IÉ InterCity livery, was to be used for spares. It was hauled from North Wall to Inchicore Works in October 2016. Belmond ceased the Grand Hibernian service in 2021. and throughout 2022 the carriages used on the service left Ireland. Later they were redesigned as Belmond's new British luxury train Britannic Explorer, which is running since July 2025.

Two Mark 3 coaches have been preserved and are currently in storage in an unknown location. These are Open Standard No. 7146 and Push/Pull DVT no. 6105. Another MkIII was formerly in preservation with the Railway Preservation Society of Ireland at their Whitehead base. Although it was never used by Irish Rail or NIR, being shipped directly over from England in 2004, it had been re-gauged to 5 ft 3 in for use as a dormitory coach for RPSI volunteers. It was numbered 26 by the RPSI, carrying on the numbering sequence of LMS NCC Caravan Coaches, and was scrapped by RPSI in 2022.

Mark 3 interiors

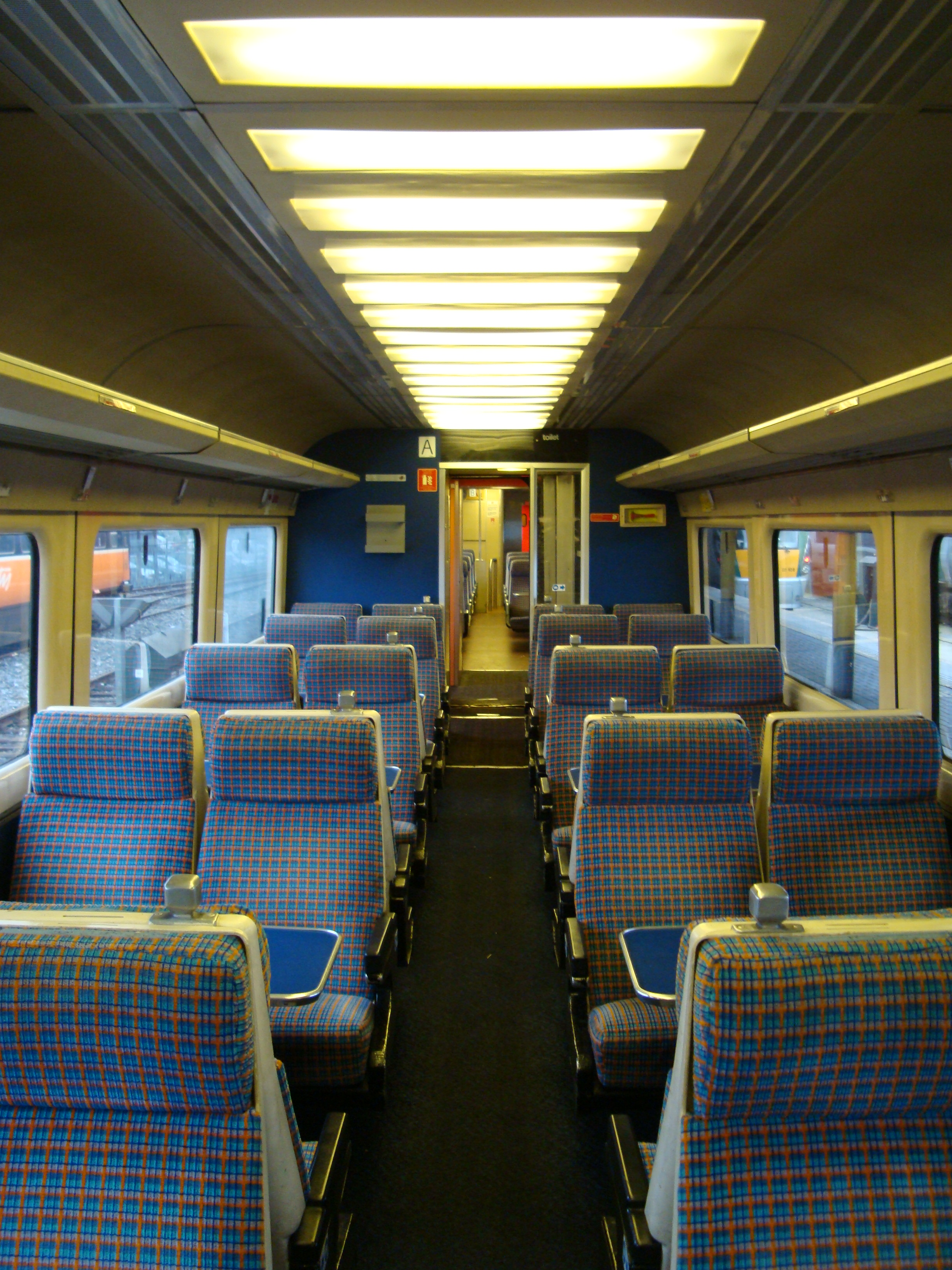
Standard class interior

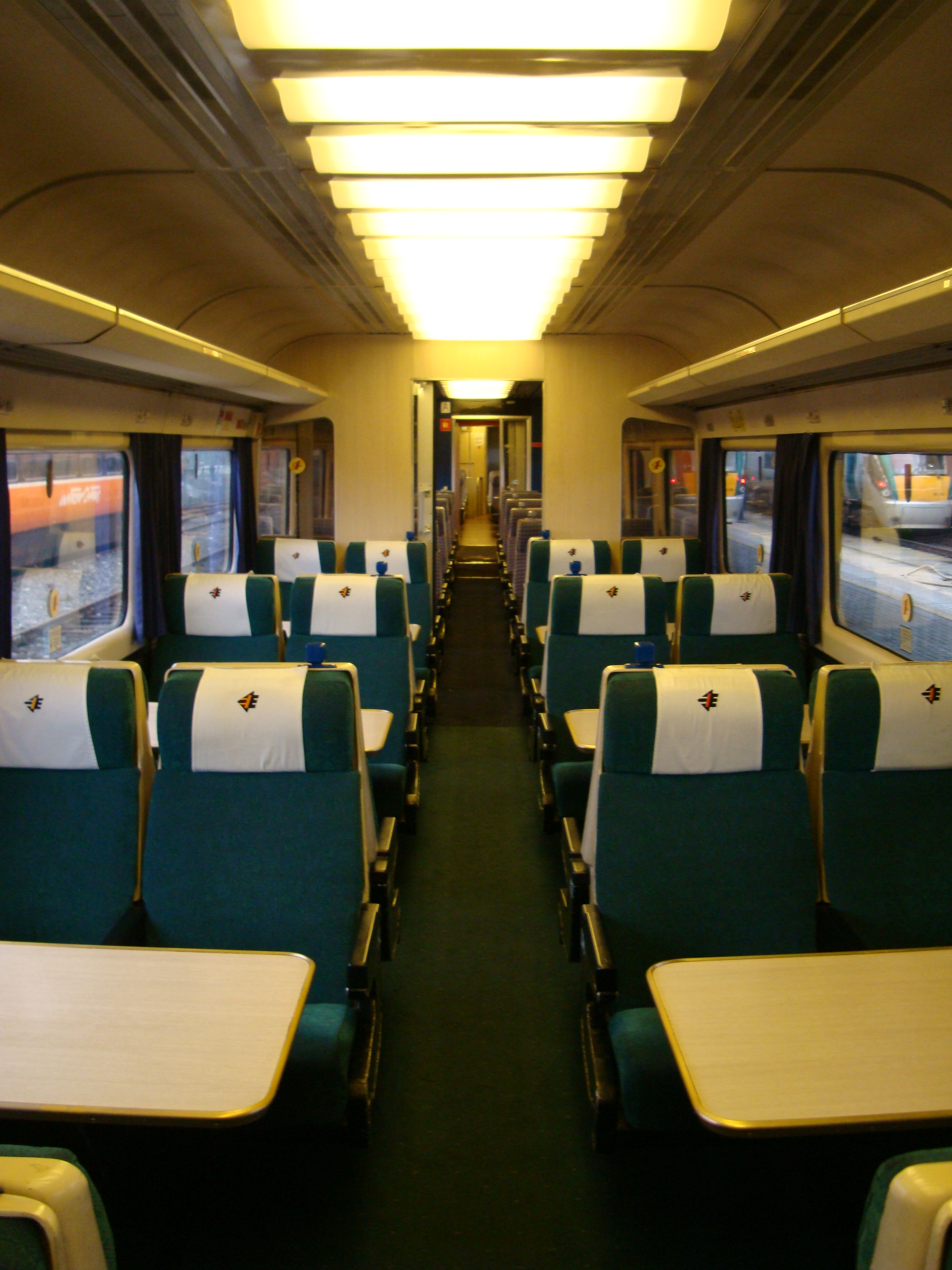
Composite interior (first class side)

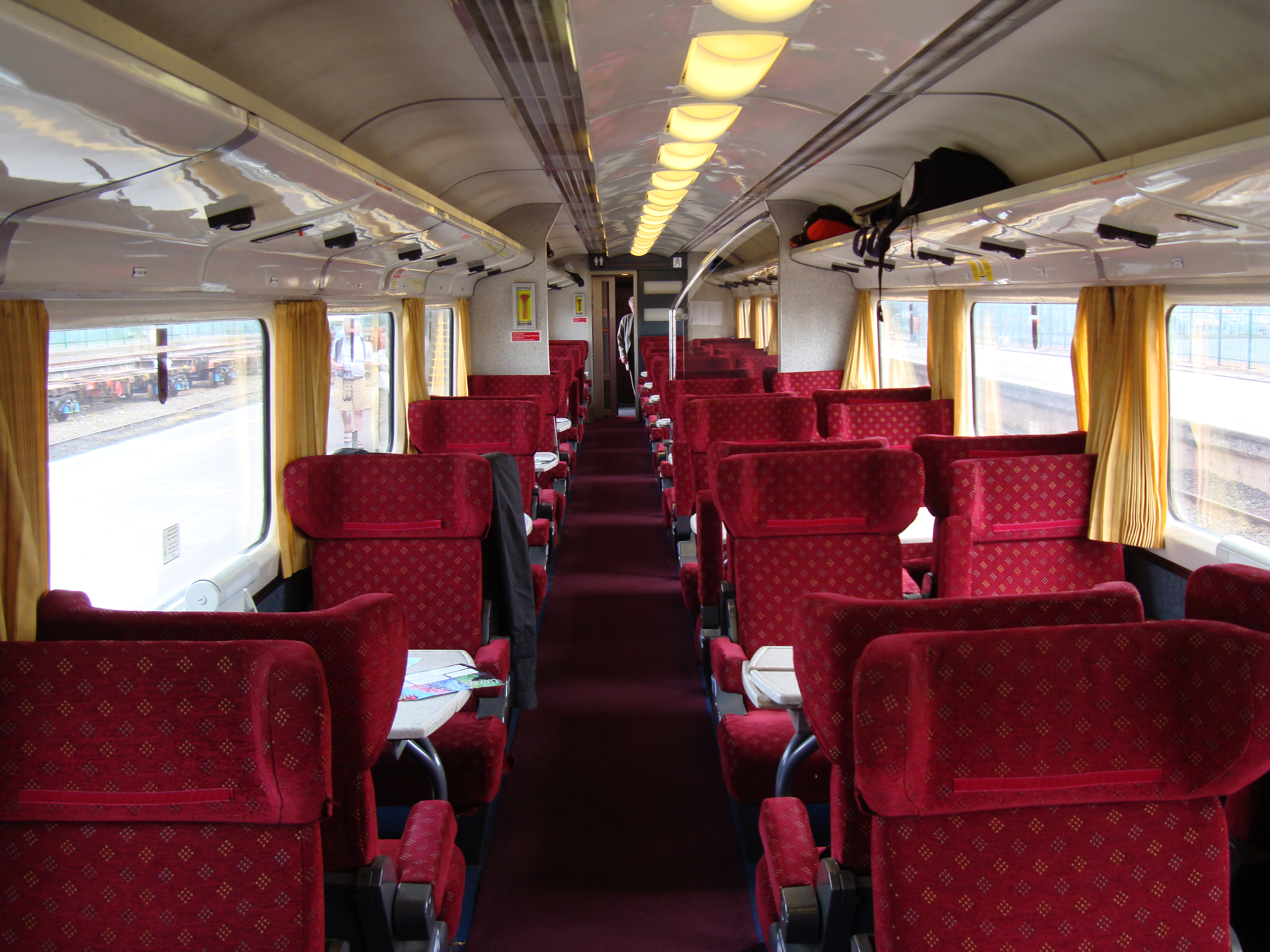
CityGold interior

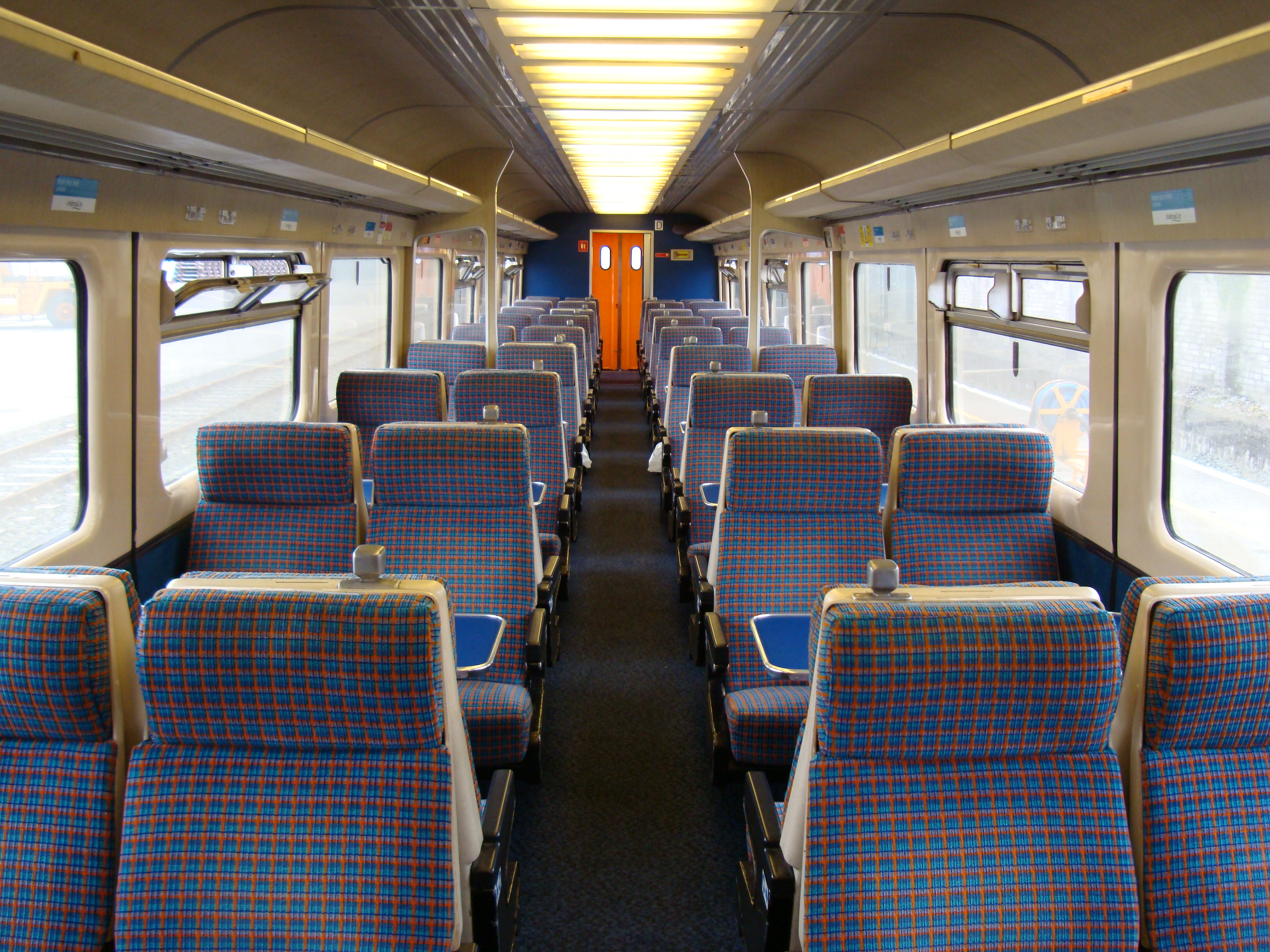
Standard push-pull coach interior

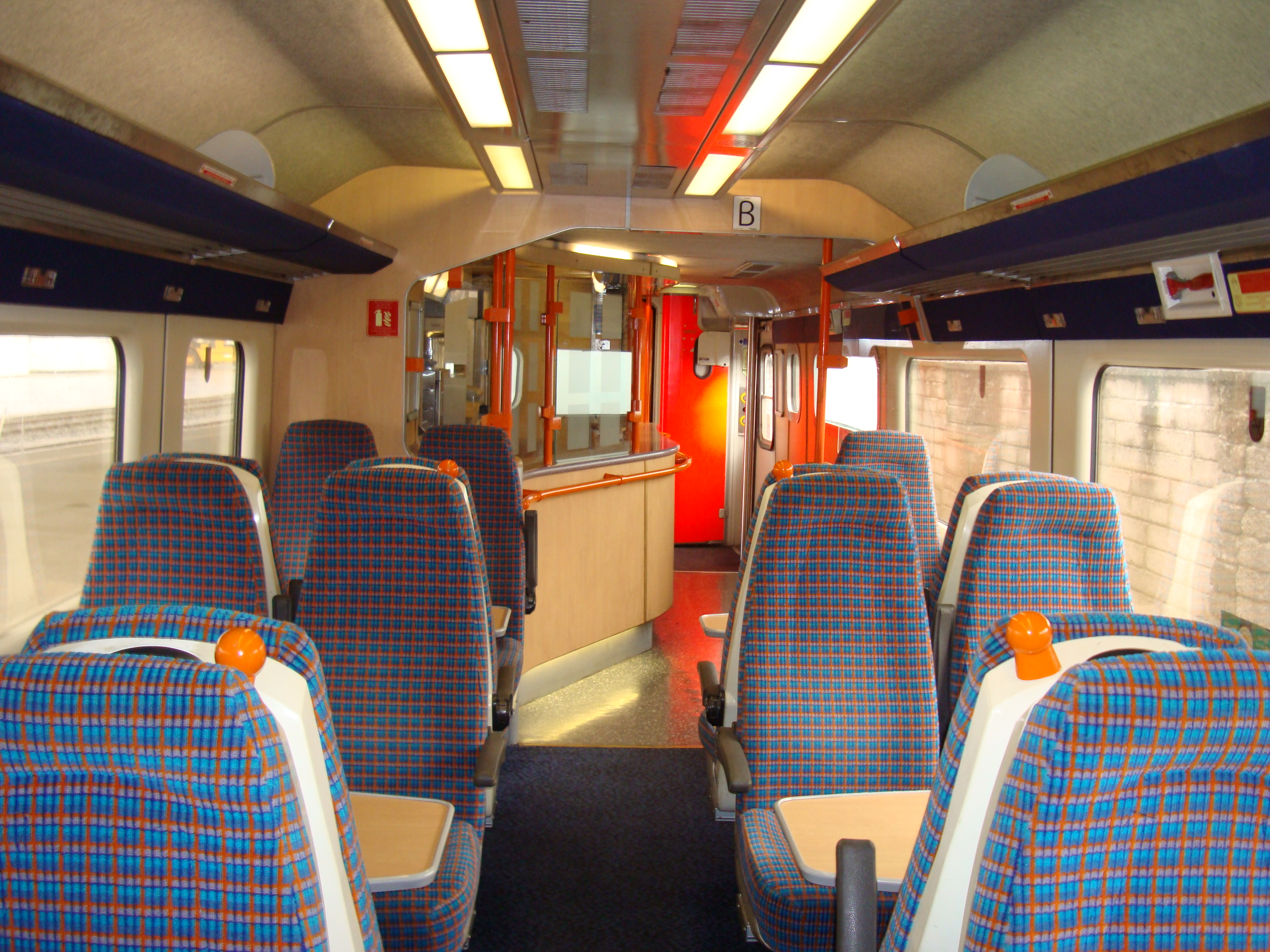
Interior of push-pull cafe/bar coach 6402

=== Liveries since inception of CIÉ ===
==== Carriages ====
The CIÉ "Flying Snail" Logo

The original CIÉ livery was dark green with and eau de nil stripe below and above the windows, similar to the former livery of Dublin United Transport Company Buses, but this was replaced in the mid 1950s. They also carried the "flying snail" emblem in the same eau de nil colour, numerals were the same, and lining, snail and numerals were all themselves thinly lined in gold. From 1955, dark green was discontinued on coaches (though retained on buses) and coaches were gradually repainted in a new lighter green livery, which was also applied to new stock after 1955/6. This was a much lighter mid-green with a thinner "eau-de-nil" (= very light green) stripe applied below windows and the flying snail emblem on some, but by no means all, vehicles. Park Royals never carried flying snails. At the end of 1955 unpainted aluminium coaches were introduced with large red 1s and 2s to indicate class and small red running numbers, but this did not wear well in everyday service. From 1958 all carriages were repainted the new standard green, somewhere in between (English) Southern Region green and Isle of Man 1970s era locomotive green. All CIÉ green livery variations had black coach ends, and while roofs were also usually black, some were occasionally very dark grey.

In 1962, just before the introduction of the "Cravens Stock", a radical new livery was introduced consisting of black upper panels, roof and body ends, deep orange (golden brown / tan) lower panels with a 6-inch white band between the windows and the roof. Roofs and ends were black. Mk 2d and Mk 3 stock as delivered were painted in a golden brown and black scheme but without the white stripes above the windows.

In February 1987, CIÉ's railway operations were transferred to a wholly owned subsidiary, Irish Rail and the 6-inch white band was replaced by two 3-inch white bands, on each side of the black portion. On Craven coaches, a 3in tan band appeared above the top white line, just under the cantrail. The words "InterCity" in large white lettering was added on the lower orange-brown section accompanied by the "IR" logo. Craven coaches and ex-BR Mk 1 generator vans were not re-branded. These continued in CIÉ black and golden brown but the white lining was changed to the narrower style on their next works visit.

In the early 1990s, the golden brown was replaced by a brighter orange (RAL 2011) and the stylised IE icon replaced the IR track logo. The new logo did not accompany the Intercity lettering, but was put on all MK2 and MK3 coach doors.

Because of the shared nature of the service the Enterprise has its own unique livery consisting of Dark Grey (NCS 8502-Y), Light Grey (NCS 5502-Y), Dark Green (NCS 9005-G20Y), Bronze strip & Enterprise logos (3M), and either Purple (NCS 5040-R40B) for Standard Class or Dark Red (NCS 4060-R10B) for First Plus.

In 2006, a new livery reminiscent of the original green has been introduced on the CAF Mark 4s. Consisting of Fern Green (NCS 4550-G), Grey (RAL 7000), Yellow (RAL 1021), Black (RAL 9005), Green (NCS 7020- B70G), Yellow Green (NCS 1070 G60Y) & Metallic Silver (761). A new logo has also been introduced to match.

==== Freight ====
Wagons were plain grey until around 1971, then gradually repainted Oxide brown and departmental stock a dull grey. Whether grey or brown, all CIÉ wagons (as with virtually all Irish freight stock of all companies) had ironwork, roofs, drawgear and chassis the same colour as the body – not picked out in black as occasionally seen elsewhere.

== Northern Ireland ==
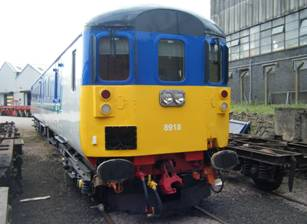
NIR's DBSO

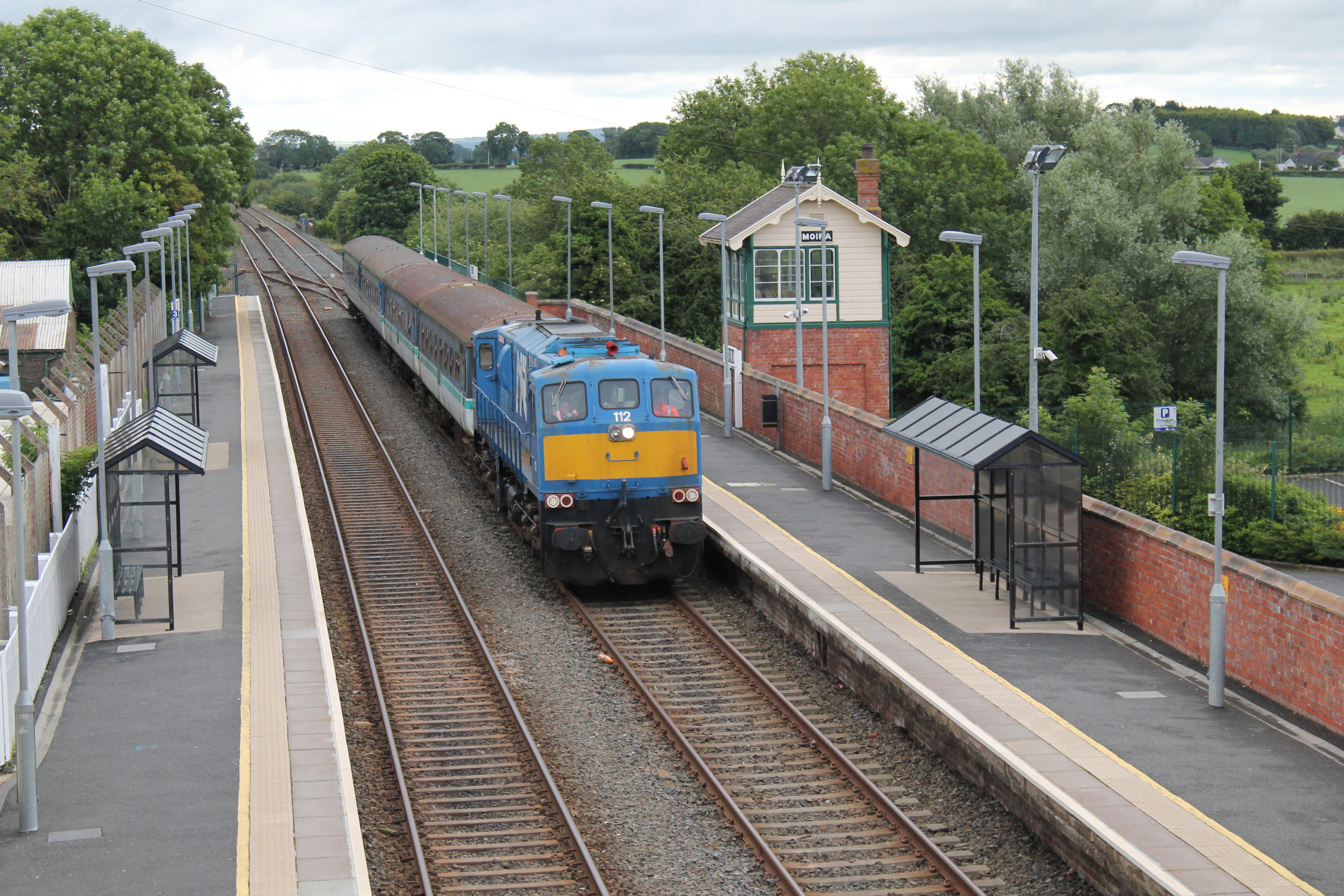
Former Gatwick Express Mark 2 coaches at Moira being transferred to Dundalk

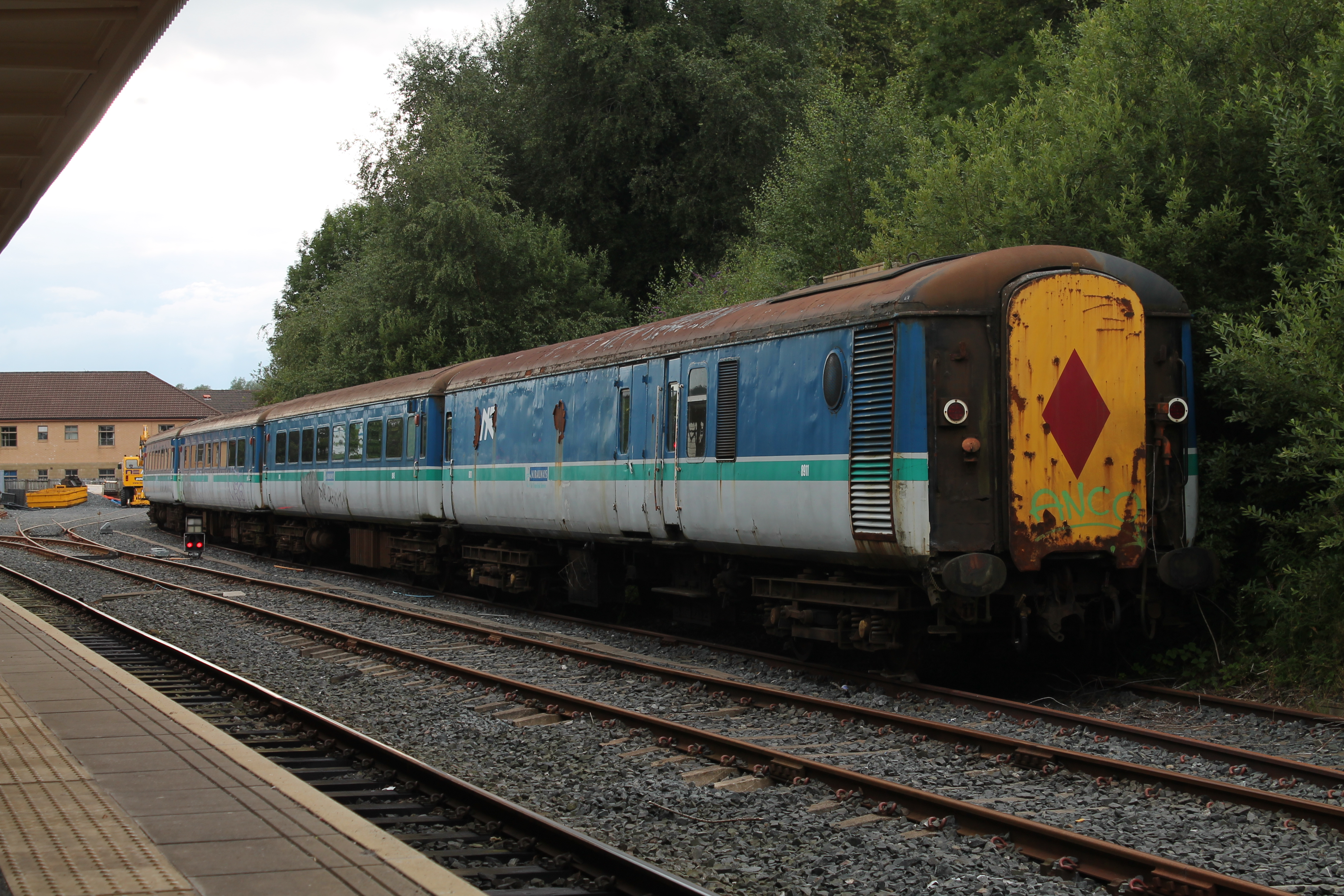
5 former Gatwick Express Mark 2 coaches stored at Lisburn. The carriage nearest the camera entered preservation with the RPSI but was later scrapped in 2022.

Although the majority of passenger services in Northern Ireland have been worked by diesel multiple units since the mid-1950s, a number of hauled coaches have been required under the tenure of both the Ulster Transport Authority (1948–1966) and Northern Ireland Railways (since 1967).

In 1970, NIR purchased a fleet of eight new-build Mark 2B's to run with the 101 Class on the cross-border Enterprise service. These were painted in a maroon and blue livery and were fitted for push-pull running. Between 1981 and 1983, to complement the arrival of the 111 Class and enhance the Enterprise service, NIR purchased 12 second-hand Mark 2s, of the B, C and F varieties, from British Rail. Some of the 1970-built coaches were refurbished for use in the new service. In the final years before the withdrawal of the 101's in 1989, they worked with Mark 2s to form suburban push-pull trains. Further Mark 2B's and F's were ordered in 1989 as part of a modernisation scheme by NIR. One notable vehicle was Mark 2F No. 904, which retained its British Rail livery in service with NIR. By 1997, all Mark 2s had been withdrawn following introduction of the DeDietrich rolling stock on the Enterprise. Today, five of these coaches survive – No.'s 300, 305 and buffet No. 547, all under the ownership of the Railway Preservation Society of Ireland, No. 546, in use in England with West Coast Railways as No. 1800, and No. 911 (See below.) A sixth, No. 901, survived in Dalton, England until July 2012 when it was finally scrapped.

From 2001 to 2009, NIR operated a single rake of coaches to supplement the DMU fleet. The total of ten were all built as Mark 2s for British Rail, and were purchased by NIR in three batches:

- Generator Van – the set has a single generator van converted from a Mark 2 BFK that was purchased and converted in 1981.
- Passenger coaches – the main part of the set is formed from eight Class 488 unpowered trailers previously operated on the Gatwick Express, which were purchased in 2001.
- Driving trailer – a DBSO was purchased in 2006 for use with the train to allow a greater degree of flexibility in its use. This was finally delivered in the summer of 2009.

From 1998, NIR prefixed their numbers with "8" so as to be part of the Translink number series, which incorporates their road vehicles The table below lists the hauled passenger coaches that were in use until June 2009 plus the never used DBSO (This excludes the "De Dietrich" stock jointly owned with IÉ for operating Enterprise services between Belfast and Dublin.

All ten coaches have since been withdrawn from service and sold into preservation. The Generator Van and eight passenger vehicles were acquired by the Railway Preservation Society of Ireland (RPSI) in 2014 with the intention of enhancing its Mark 2 fleet, though in 2022 began disposing of the set. The DBSO has been purchased by the Downpatrick and County Down Railway is used as a barrier vehicle to allow a 121 class or 141 class locomotives to haul the DCDR's Class 450 DEMU.

NIR Number	Introduced in NI	BR Number(s)	Built	Type	Fate	Current location
911 / 8911	1981	14104	1969 Derby	Generator Van (ex-Mark 2B BFK)	Scrapped by RPSI	Ahoghill
941 / 8941	2001	6089 / 72634	1974 Derby	TSO (ex-BR Class 488 unit 488318)	Scrapped by RPSI	Ahoghill
942 / 8942	2001	6098 / 72637	1974 Derby	TSO (ex-BR Class 488 unit 488318)	Scrapped by RPSI	Ahoghill
943 / 8943	2001	6082 / 72605	1974 Derby	TSO (ex-BR Class 488 unit 488305)	Scrapped by RPSI	Ahoghill
944 / 8944	2001	6080 / 72609	1974 Derby	TSO (ex-BR Class 488 unit 488305)	Scrapped by RPSI	Ahoghill
945 / 8945	2001	6017 / 72626	1974 Derby	TSO (ex-BR Class 488 unit 488314)	Preserved by RPSI	Whitehead Excursion Station
946 / 8946	2001	5974 / 72627	1974 Derby	TSO (ex-BR Class 488 unit 488314)	Preserved by RPSI	Whitehead Excursion Station
947 / 8947	2001	6078 / 72646	1974 Derby	TSO (ex-BR Class 488 unit 488319)	Preserved by RPSI	Whitehead Excursion Station
948 / 8948	2001	6081 / 72647	1974 Derby	TSO (ex-BR Class 488 unit 488319)	Preserved by RPSI	Whitehead Excursion Station
918 / 8918	(2009)	9534 / 9712	1974 Derby; Rebuilt 1985 Glasgow	DBSO (ex-Mark 2F BSO)	Preserved by DCDR	Downpatrick railway station

== List of carriages ==
=== Mainline carriages ===
Number	Quantity	Type	Company	Entered service	Routes used on
Mark 4
4001–4008	8	Driving Van Trailer	Iarnród Éireann	2006	Dublin – Cork
4201–4208	8	First class	Iarnród Éireann	2006	Dublin – Cork
4401–4408	8	Buffet car	Iarnród Éireann	2006	Dublin – Cork
4101–4104, 4106–4109, 4111–4114, 4116–4119, 4121–4124, 4126–4129, 4131–4134, 4136–4139, 4141–4143	35	Standard class	Iarnród Éireann	2006	Dublin – Cork
4105, 4110, 4115, 4120, 4125, 4130, 4135, 4140	8	End vehicle, standard class	Iarnród Éireann	2006	Dublin – Cork
DeDietrich
9001–9004	4	Driving Van Trailer, First class	Iarnród Éireann, NI Railways (Enterprise)	1997	Dublin – Belfast
9101–9104	4	First class	Iarnród Éireann, NI Railways (Enterprise)	1997	Dublin – Belfast
9401–9404	4	Buffet car	Iarnród Éireann, NI Railways (Enterprise)	1997	Dublin – Belfast
9201–9216	16	Standard class	Iarnród Éireann, NI Railways (Enterprise)	1997	Dublin – Belfast
Mark 3
9602, 9604, 9606, 9608	4	Generator van	NI Railways	1984	Dublin – Belfast (Enterprise)

=== Preserved carriages ===
Number	Original company	Preserved by	Present location	Current status	Notes
Mark 1
3173	British Rail	RPSI	Inchicore	In service	
3185	British Rail	RPSI	Inchicore	Stored	
4474	British Rail	Glenlo Abbey Hotel	Near Galway	Grounded	Used as a restaurant
Mark 2
180	British Rail	RPSI	Whitehead	In service	
181	British Rail	RPSI	Whitehead	Currently being overhauled	
300	NI Railways	RPSI	Whitehead	In service	
301	British Rail	RPSI	Whitehead	In service	
302	British Rail	RPSI	Whitehead	Currently being overhauled	
303	Córas Iompair Éireann	RPSI	Whitehead	In service	
304	Córas Iompair Éireann	RPSI	Whitehead	Under restoration	
305	NI Railways	RPSI	Whitehead	Under restoration	
306	British Rail	RPSI	Whitehead	Under restoration	Acquired from Caledonian Railway in August 2022 and regauged
460	British Rail	RPSI	Whitehead	In service	
463	British Rail	RPSI	Whitehead	In service	
547	NI Railways	RPSI	Whitehead	In service	Buffet carriage
4106	British Rail	WSVR	Kilmeaden	Grounded	
4402	British Rail	WCR	Moyasta	Grounded	
5408	Córas Iompair Éireann	RPSI	Whitehead	Stored	Presidential Carriage
8918	British Rail	DCDR	Downpatrick	Stored	
8945	British Rail	RPSI	Whitehead	Stored	
8946	British Rail	RPSI	Whitehead	Stored	
8947	British Rail	RPSI	Whitehead	Stored	
8948	British Rail	RPSI	Whitehead	Stored	
Mark 3
6105	Córas Iompair Éireann	Camping site	Puckane	Stored	Last carriage built in Inchicore
6203	British Rail	Curragh Nurseries	Near Naas	Grounded	Used as restaurant
6205	British Rail	Killashee House Hotel	Near Naas	Grounded	
7146	Córas Iompair Éireann	Camping site	Puckane	Stored	
7161	Córas Iompair Éireann	Limerick Greenway	Newcastle West	Static display	Former Executive Coach, moved to Limerick Greenway for display in August 2022
10598	British Rail	Connemara Railway	Maam Cross	Stored	Arrived April 2023 for use as volunteer accommodation, on 5'3" accommodation boogies.
''Dutch Van'' EGVs
462	Córas Iompair Éireann	RPSI	Whitehead	Stored	
4602	Córas Iompair Éireann	RPSI	Whitehead	Stored	
Cravens
1505	Córas Iompair Éireann	RPSI	Inchicore	In service	
1506	Córas Iompair Éireann	RPSI	Inchicore	In service	
1508	Córas Iompair Éireann	RPSI	Inchicore	In service	
1514	Córas Iompair Éireann	RPSI	Inchicore	In service	Converted to Bar Coach
1522	Córas Iompair Éireann	RPSI	Inchicore	In service	Converted to Dinning Coach
1523	Córas Iompair Éireann	RPSI	Inchicore	In service	
1529	Córas Iompair Éireann	RPSI	Inchicore	Stored	
1532	Córas Iompair Éireann	RPSI	Inchicore	In service	
1539	Córas Iompair Éireann	RPSI	Inchicore	Under Restoration	
1541	Córas Iompair Éireann	RPSI	Inchicore	In service	
1558	Córas Iompair Éireann	Killashee House Hotel	Near Naas	Grounded	
Park Royals
1383	Córas Iompair Éireann	RPSI	Inchicore	Stored	
1400	Córas Iompair Éireann	West Cork Model Railway Village	Clonakilty	Static display	
1419	Córas Iompair Éireann	RPSI	Inchicore	Stored	
1424	Córas Iompair Éireann	West Cork Model Railway Village	Clonakilty	Static display	
1944	Córas Iompair Éireann	DCDR	Downpatrick	In service	Returned to traffic 24 November 2018 after 20-year overhaul
6111	Córas Iompair Éireann	DCDR	Downpatrick	Stored	Body supplied by Park Royal, but was a railcar the predated the 1955 carriages
Laminates & Bredins
1144	GSR	Cavan and Leitrim Railway	Dromod	Grounded	These are the only 3 pieces of GSR rolling stock left.
1325	GSR	WCR	Moyasta	Grounded	These are the only 3 pieces of GSR rolling stock left.
1335	GSR	RPSI	Whitehead	Operational	These are the only 3 pieces of GSR rolling stock left.
1460	Córas Iompair Éireann	Kiltimagh Heritage Centre	Kiltimagh	Static display	
1463	Córas Iompair Éireann	RPSI	Inchicore	Stored	
1468	Córas Iompair Éireann	Sligo Folk Park	Riverstown	Static display	
1633	Córas Iompair Éireann	Dunsandle Railway Station	Dunsandle	Static display	
1916	Córas Iompair Éireann	Connemara Railway	Maam Cross	Stored	Moved to Maam Cross May 2023
1918	Córas Iompair Éireann	DCDR	Downpatrick	In service	
1934	Córas Iompair Éireann	Cavan and Leitrim Railway	Dromod	Grounded	
2419	Córas Iompair Éireann	DCDR	Downpatrick	In service	
2421	Córas Iompair Éireann	Connemara Railway	Maam Cross	Stored	Moved to Maam Cross May 2023
2422	Córas Iompair Éireann	RPSI	Whitehead	Static display	
2977	Córas Iompair Éireann	An Post	Downpatrick	Static display	Travelling post office
3223	Córas Iompair Éireann	DCDR	Downpatrick	In service	
1935	Córas Iompair Éireann	Kiltimagh Heritage Centre	Kiltimagh	Static display	
Other Bogie Coaches
50	GNR	RPSI	Whitehead	Static display	
68	NCC	RPSI	Whitehead	Stored	
72	BCDR	DCDR	Downpatrick	Static display, but operational	Railmotor coach
87	UTA	RPSI	Whitehead	Static display	Built in Dunmurry Bus Workshops. Ex UTA 70 Class
88	GNR	RPSI	Inchicore	Stored	
91	NCC	RPSI	Whitehead	Stored	
114	GNR	RPSI	Whitehead	Stored	
148/152	BCDR	DCDR	Downpatrick	Static display, but operational	Two half-carriages joined together (Half 148 and half 152)
153	BCDR	DCDR	Downpatrick	Stored	Royal Saloon
208	British Rail	Glenlo Abbey Hotel	Near Galway	Grounded	Named ''Leona'', used as a restaurant
243	NCC	RPSI	Whitehead	Under restoration	
351	GSWR	RPSI	Inchicore	Stored	State carriage
404	NCC	RPSI	Whitehead	Grounded	Former ambulance coach
411	NCC	RPSI	Whitehead	Stored	
618	GNR	RPSI	Whitehead	Stored	Parcels van
728	UTA	DCDR	Downpatrick	In service	Ex UTA 70 Class
713	UTA	DCDR	Downpatrick	In service	Flatbed. Ex UTA 70 Class destroyed in Arson attack
813	GSWR	Connemara Railway	Maam Cross	Stored	Moved to Maam Cross 2022
836	GSWR	DCDR	Downpatrick	Under restoration	
837	GSWR	RPSI	Whitehead	Stored	
861	GSWR	RPSI	Whitehead	Under restoration	Tricomposite, 12-wheeler
1097	GSWR	RPSI	Downpatrick	Stored	
1142	GSWR	RPSI	Inchicore	Stored	
1287	GSWR	RPSI	Downpatrick	In use	Tricomposite, used as DCDR tarry
1949	GNR	RPSI	Inchicore	Stored	
9454	British Rail	Glenlo Abbey Hotel	Near Galway	Grounded	Used as a restaurant
Non-Bogie Coaches
4-Wheeled
33	Ulster Railway	DCDR	Downpatrick	Under restoration	Only surviving Ulster Railway vehicle
47	DKR	UFTM	Cultra	Static display	Oldest carriage in Ireland
638a	Córas Iompair Éireann	DCDR	Downpatrick	Under restoration	Delivered to Downpatrick 05/03/2019
6-Wheeled
Unknown	GNR	Unknown	Near Carlingford	Grounded	
Unknown	GNR	Unknown	Near Dundalk	Grounded	
Unknown	GNR	DCDR	Downpatrick	Stored	
Unknown	Unknown	Cavan & Leitrim Railway	Dromod	Stored	
1	DNGR	UFTM	Cultra	Static display	
25	MGWR	DCDR	Downpatrick	Stored	
39	BCDR	DCDR	Downpatrick	Stored	
47	MGWR	UFTM	Cultra	Static display	William Dargan's private saloon
53	MGWR	DCDR	Downpatrick	Stored	
62	MGWR	RPSI	Whitehead	Under restoration	
13M	MGWR	DCDR	Downpatrick	Stored	Underframes only
69	GSWR	DCDR	Downpatrick		
84	MGWR	Station House Hotel	Clifden	Stored	
154	BCDR	DCDR	Downpatrick	Stored	
900	WLWR	Belturbet railway station	Belturbet	Stored	
907	GSWR	Halfway Vintage Club	Halfway	Static display	
Narrow Gauge Carriages
3 ft Gauge
Unknown	BNT	Unknown	Whitehead	Under restoration	
Unknown	Waterford & Suir Valley Railway	Waterford & Suir Valley Railway	Kilmeaden	In service	
Unknown	Waterford & Suir Valley Railway	Waterford & Suir Valley Railway	Kilmeaden	In service	
Unknown	British Aluminium	Irish Steam Preservation Society	Stradbally	In service	
18	Shane's Castle Railway	Fintown Railway	Fintown	Stored	
Unknown	Giant's Causeway	NTMI	Dublin	Under restoration	
Unnumbered	Shane's Castle Railway	Giant's Causeway & Bushmills Railway	Giant's Causeway	Stored	Loco-hauled passenger carriages. Withdrawn in 2012.
Unnumbered	Shane's Castle Railway	Giant's Causeway & Bushmills Railway	Giant's Causeway	Stored	Loco-hauled passenger carriages. Withdrawn in 2012.
Unnumbered	Shane's Castle Railway	Giant's Causeway & Bushmills Railway	Giant's Causeway	Stored	Loco-hauled passenger carriages. Withdrawn in 2012.
Unnumbered	Shane's Castle Railway	Giant's Causeway & Bushmills Railway	Giant's Causeway	Stored	Loco-hauled passenger carriages. Withdrawn in 2012.
Unnumbered	Shane's Castle Railway	Giant's Causeway & Bushmills Railway	Giant's Causeway	Stored	Loco-hauled passenger carriages. Withdrawn in 2012.
Unnumbered	Shane's Castle Railway	Giant's Causeway & Bushmills Railway	Giant's Causeway	Stored	Loco-hauled passenger carriages. Withdrawn in 2012.
Unnumbered	Shane's Castle Railway	Giant's Causeway & Bushmills Railway	Giant's Causeway	Stored	Guard's Vans; Withdrawn in 2012.
Unnumbered	Shane's Castle Railway	Giant's Causeway & Bushmills Railway	Giant's Causeway	Stored	Guard's Vans; Withdrawn in 2012.
Unnumbered	Giant's Causeway & Bushmills Railway	Giant's Causeway & Bushmills Railway	Giant's Causeway	In service	Replica of original tram.
Unnumbered	Giant's Causeway & Bushmills Railway	Giant's Causeway & Bushmills Railway	Giant's Causeway	In service	Replica of original tram.
Unnumbered	Giant's Causeway & Bushmills Railway	Giant's Causeway & Bushmills Railway	Giant's Causeway	In service	Replica of original tram.
Unnumbered	Giant's Causeway & Bushmills Railway	Giant's Causeway & Bushmills Railway	Giant's Causeway	In service	Replica of original tram. Motorised.
1	Shane's Castle Railway	Giant's Causeway and Bushmills Railway	Giant's Causeway	Stored	
1	CDR	UFTM	Cultra	Static display	Tricomposite
2	Shane's Castle Railway	Giant's Causeway and Bushmills Railway	Giant's Causeway	Stored	
2	Giant's Causeway	UFTM	Cultra	Static Display	
2	BNT	UFTM	Cultra	Static Display	
3	CDR	UFTM	Cultra	Static Display	
3	Shane's Castle Railway	Giant's Causeway and Bushmills Railway	Giant's Causeway	Stored	
4	CVBT	UFTM	Cultra	Static Display	
5	Giant's Causeway	UFTM	Cultra	Static Display	
5	CDR	Donegal Railway Heritage Centre	Donegal	Grounded	
15	CDR	Donegal Railway Heritage Centre	Donegal	Grounded	
5	CLR	UFTM	Cultra	Static Display	
7	CLR	Irish Steam Preservation Society	Stradbally	In service	
13	CLR	Cavan & Leitrim Railway	Dromod	In service	New build, 1997
14	CDR	Foyle Valley Railway	Derry	Static display	
18	LLSR	Foyle Valley Railway	Derry	Static display	
28	CDR	Donegal Railway Heritage Centre	Donegal	Static display	
30	CDR	Foyle Valley Railway	Derry	Static display	
47	TDLR	Cavan & Leitrim Railway	Dromod	In service	
7T	TDLR	Cavan & Leitrim Railway	Dromod	In service	
10T	TDLR	Cavan & Leitrim Railway	Dromod	In service	
345	GNR	Cavan & Leitrim Railway	Dromod	In service	Unpowered former railbus
352	CDR	Dunfanaghy Glamping	Dunfanaghy	Grounded	Now a 'glamping' coach
2 ft Gauge
Unknown	Lilleshall Estate Railway	Arigna Mining Experience	Roosky	Stored	
Unknown	Lilleshall Estate Railway	Arigna Mining Experience	Roosky	Stored	
1 ft 10 in Gauge
2	Guinness Brewery	UFTM	Cultra	Under restoration	
3	Guinness Brewery	UFTM	Cultra	Static display	
15 in Gauge
3	Difflin Lake Railway	Difflin Lake Railway	Oakfield Park, near Raphoe	In service	
4	Difflin Lake Railway	Difflin Lake Railway	Oakfield Park, near Raphoe	In service	
6	Difflin Lake Railway	Difflin Lake Railway	Oakfield Park, near Raphoe	In service	
7	Difflin Lake Railway	Difflin Lake Railway	Oakfield Park, near Raphoe	In service	

== See also ==
- Diesel Locomotives of Ireland
- Freight Stock of Ireland
- Multiple units of Ireland
- Steam Locomotives of Ireland
