= Buttevant Rail Disaster =

1980 train crash in Buttevant, County Cork, Ireland

Buttevant rail disaster
- Location within Ireland

Details
- Date: 1 August 1980; 12:45
- Location: Buttevant
- Coordinates: 52.2331°N 8.6669°W
- Country: Ireland
- Line: Dublin–Cork railway line
- Operator: Córas Iompar Éireann
- Cause: Express sent into sidings as points not interlocked

Statistics
- Trains: 1
- Passengers: ~230
- Deaths: 18
- Injured: 70+

The Buttevant Rail Disaster was a train crash that occurred on 1 August 1980 at Buttevant Railway Station, County Cork, in Ireland, 220 kilometres (137 mi) from Dublin on the main line to Cork. More than 70 people were injured, and 18 died, making it Ireland's worst rail disaster.

== Crash ==
At 12:45 p.m., the 10:00 a.m. Dublin (Heuston) to Cork (Kent) express train entered Buttevant station carrying 230 bank holiday passengers. The train was diverted off the main line across a 1:8 temporary set of points into a siding. The locomotive remained upright but the carriages immediately behind the engine and generator van jack-knifed and were thrown across four sets of rail lines. Two coaches and the dining car were totally demolished by the impact. This resulted in the deaths of 18 people and over 70 people being injured.

The crash happened because a set of manual facing points were set to direct the train into the siding. These points had been installed about four months previously and were not connected to the signal cabin. The permanent way maintenance staff were expecting a stationary locomotive at the Up platform to move into the siding and had set the points for the diversion to the siding without obtaining permission from the signalman. Upon seeing that this had been done, the signalman at Buttevant manually set the signals to the Danger aspect and informed the pointsman to reset the points.

The train was travelling too fast to stop in time. The derailment occurred at around 60 mph (97 km/h).

Local doctor Finnbarr Kennedy was nearby at the time of the crash, waiting to cross the line, and was able to give aid to those injured.

=== The train ===
The train consisted of 071 Class locomotive number 075, a generator van and 11 coaches. Six of the coaches had wooden bodies on steel underframes. Four of these were either destroyed or badly damaged, the two which survived being at the rear of the train. The remainder of the coaches were light-alloy Cravens stock; most of which survived the crash. The generator van, a modified BR Mark 1, was severely damaged. All of the vehicles were coupled using screw shackle couplings.

- Locomotive 075 (1976), front plates damaged
- Generator/boiler & guards van, No. 3191 (1971), severely damaged
- Open 1st class, / timber body No. 1145 (1963), body destroyed
- Buffet car / timber body No. 2408 (1953), body destroyed
- Self-service car / timber body No. 2412 (1954), body destroyed
- Standard carriage / plywood body No. 1491 (1961), badly damaged
- Standard craven / light alloy frame No. 1529 (1964), badly damaged
- Standard craven / light alloy frame No. 1527 (1964), body damaged
- Standard craven / light alloy frame No. 1508 (1964), both ends damaged
- Standard craven / light alloy frame No. 1542 (1965), one end damaged
- Standard craven / light alloy frame No. 1541 (1965), no damage
- Open standard / timber body No. 1365 (1953), no damage
- Standard class and brake van / timber body No. 1936 (1959), no damage

== Aftermath ==
This event, and the subsequent Cherryville junction accident, which killed a further seven people, accounted for 70% of all Irish rail deaths over a 28-year period. CIÉ and the Government came under severe public pressure to improve safety and to modernise the fleet. A major review of the national rail safety policy was held and resulted in the rapid elimination of the wooden-bodied coaches that had formed part of the train.

The passengers who were most severely injured or killed were seated in coaches with wooden frames. This structure was incapable of withstanding a high-speed crash and did not come near to the safety standards provided by modern (post-1950s) metal-body coaches. The expert bodies that reviewed the accident discovered that the old timber-frame carriage bodies mounted on a steel frame were totally inadequate as they were prone to complete collapse (the "accordion" effect) under the enormous compression forces of a high-speed collision. While the steel underbody remained structurally intact, other carriages could "mount" the frame, completely compress and destroy the wooden frame body.

The more modern steel-framed carriage bodies remained intact due to their greater structural rigidity. On this basis, the decision was quickly made to purchase a new fleet of modern intercity coaches based on the British Rail Mark 3 design. The Mark 3's longitudinally corrugated roof can survive compression forces of over 300 tonnes. These coaches, of an already well-proven design, were built by BREL in Derby, England and, under licence, at CIÉ's own workshops at Inchicore in Dublin between 1983 and 1989.

== Commemoration ==
On 8 August 2005, a commemoration marking the 25th anniversary of the accident was held at the station. A bronze sculpture in the shape of two crossing train tracks was unveiled alongside a plaque commemorating the names of the 18 victims.

- Eileen Redmond, aged 66, Leinster Terrace Wexford
- Patrick Larkin, aged 77, of 18 Parkview West, Templemore, County Tipperary
- Sr. De Lourdes O’ Brien, aged 68, of Convent of Jesus and Mary Gortnor Abbey, Crossmolina, County Mayo
- Sr. Mary Stanislaus Kelleher, aged 63, of Convent of Jesus and Mary Gortnor Abbey, Crossmolina, County Mayo
- Bruce Woodworth, aged 36, of Carrighoun, Old Court, Rochestown, Cork
- Seamus Coffey, aged 27, of Monalea Estate, Tallaght, County Dublin
- Timothy McCarthy, aged 56, of Hansboror Road, Wellington Road, Cork, who was the train guard.
- Sr. Margaret Mary O’ Donoghue, aged 68, of Sister of Providence in the Rosminian Convent, Loughborough, Leicestershire, England
- Margaret Devlin, aged 29, of St. Josephe’s Villas, Athlone, County Westmeath
- John O’Connor, aged 50, of Greenfield Avoca Avenue, Blackrock, County Dublin
- Mark Barron, aged 18, of Palmerstown Avenue, Palmerstown, County Dublin
- Patrick Alan George, aged 25, of 22 Rue du Docteur Mazet, Grenoble, France. A native of Middlesex, he had been attached to the staff of the Institut Laue-Langevin, Grenoble, for three years
- Albin Zainer, age 50s, of 1050 Brandmayergasse, Vienna
- Maria Anna Zainer, wife of Albin Zainer, age 50s, of 1050 Brandmayergasse, Vienna
- Gertrude Bertha Unterberger, aged 71, of Box 690, R.D., 4 East Stroudsburg, Pennsylvania, USA
- Virgil John Livingston, aged 70, of 13030 Mitchwin Road, Mitchwin Road, Dallas, Texas, USA
- Samuel Samuel Owen Corke, aged 60, of 81 Warwick Place, Priors park, Tewkesbury, Gloucestershire, England
- Winifred Meaher, of Templemore, County Tipperary, was originally listed as critically injured and became the 18th fatality of the crash.
