= Rathdown School =

Private school in Dublin, Ireland

Coordinates: 53.276458°N 6.12982578°W

- Glenageary, County Dublin; Ireland

Information
- Type: Private day and boarding school
- Religious affiliation: Protestant but inclusive
- Established: 1973
- Principal: Alan Cox
- Years offered: Pre-school (age 3) - Leaving Cert. (~18 years)
- Gender: Mixed
- Houses: Hall, Hillcourt, Park, Glengara
- Colours: Blue and green
- Website: Official website

Rathdown School is a private day school in Glenageary, Dublin, Ireland operating under the management of a charitable trust and with a Protestant but inclusive ethos. For most of its history an all-girls school, it became co-educational in 2023. Rathdown provides pre-school, junior and senior level education. Located on a 16-acre site, about 12 kilometres from Dublin City Centre. The school's colours are blue and green.

== History ==
Rathdown School was founded in 1973 from an amalgamation of three schools: Park House School, The Hall School and Hillcourt School, with Glengara Park School merging in 1987. The school was originally spread across three sites, in Monkstown, Glenageary and Morehampton Road in Dublin 4. In September 1974 the school consolidated at Hillcourt's site in Glenageary (although an additional branch of the Junior School continued to operate in the Morehampton Road buildings until 1978).

=== Park House School ===
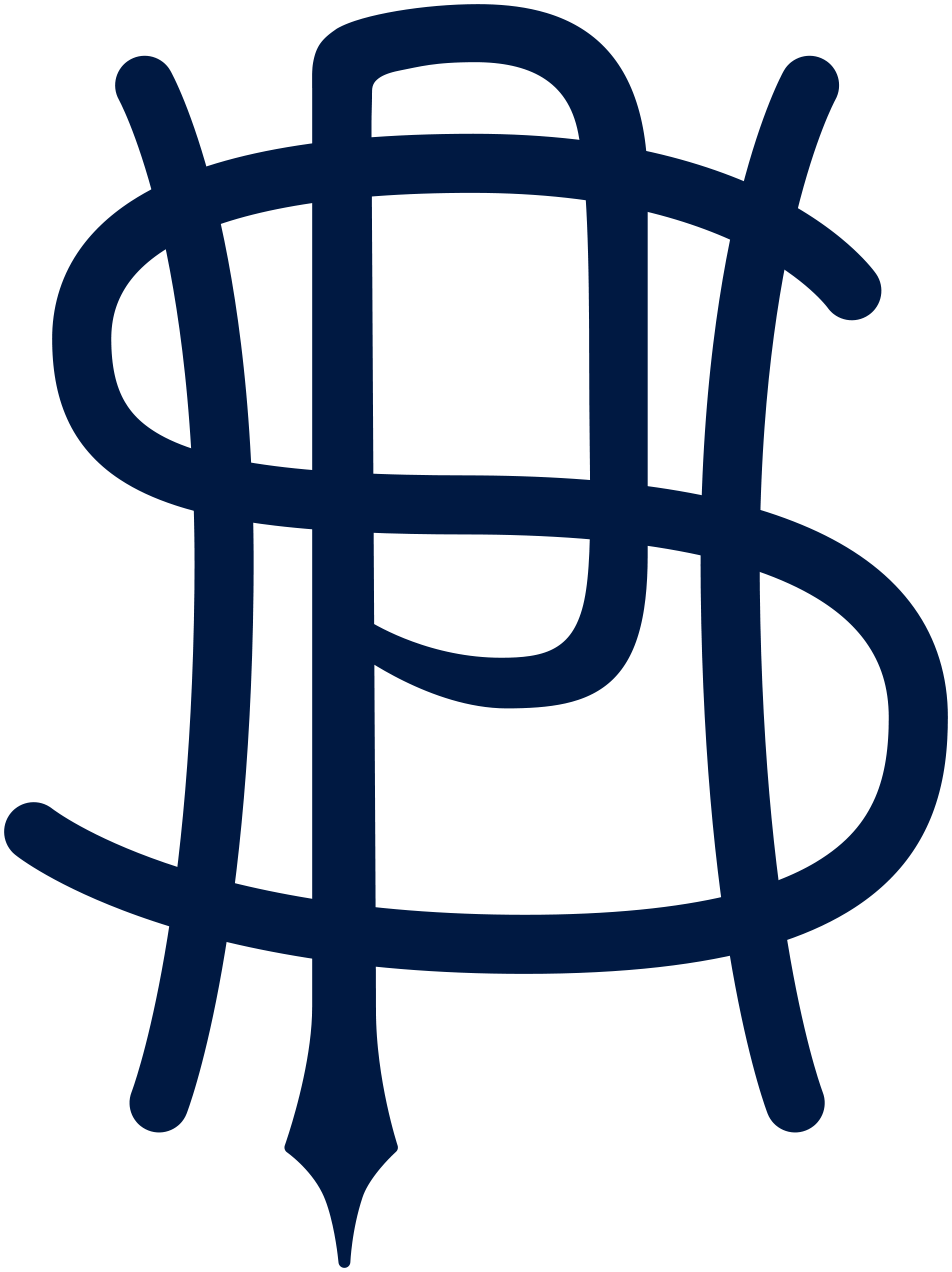
The Park House School crest, PHS, traced from an old blazer pocket.

Park House School was founded in Morehampton Road, Dublin 4, in 1932 by Froebel-trained Lilian Mary Rouviere Fayle. She was the daughter of Methodist leader WK Fayle, who had a hardware shop in Birr, County Offaly, and the niece of the suffragist, novelist, and playwright Susanne Rouviere Day. She was educated at Mount Mellick Quaker School and Polam Hall School in Durham.

Park House (named for nearby Herbert Park) was a mixed school, originally set up as a preparatory school for Sandford Park, and its ethos mirrored the very progressive approach of its founder. The school pioneered judo and fencing for girls, and encouraged parents to be involved with the school and with their children's education. Jennifer Johnston was an early pupil, and her performance in the 1936 Christmas play (when she was six) was reported by the Irish Times. Mary Fayle encouraged June Fryer, later June Kuhn, to study modern dance. She introduced June as a student to Erina Brady, German-born pioneer of modern dance. When June Kuhn died in 2011, the Irish Times described her as Ireland's first modern dance performer.

After Miss Fayle's death in 1946 the school was taken over by Esther and Beryl Kennedy, and on their retirement the school was bought by a group of parents of existing pupils. They appointed Mrs Cecile Catt, who had taught in the school for 12 years, as headmistress, and she remained in that role for ten years. Then, in 1973, Park House merged with The Hall School and Hillcourt to form Rathdown School. For several years Rathdown maintained a branch of its junior school in Park House's Morehampton Road buildings, but in 1978 this branch was closed, leaving the whole operation at the Glenageary site. Stella G. Mew was principal first of Hillcourt and then of Rathdown School from 1972-2002. When she retired she took up a position as CEO of the Yeats Society.

=== 21st century ===
Rathdown was the first school in Ireland where pupils used iPads in class.

In 2022, the school announced that it would be becoming co-educational, and would accept boys into the junior school from September 2022, and into the senior school from September 2023, and these changes proceeded on schedule, with around one third of first years in 2023 being boys.

== Governance ==
The school is owned by a charitable trust, Rathdown School Trust, which is led by a board of governors (who are also the charity's trustees). Its operations are overseen by a board of management, composed of four governors, two parents and two teachers, with the school head attending. Both boards delegate day-to-day leadership to the head of school.

== Curriculum ==
Rathdown has pupils from pre-school age (3 years) to Leaving Certificate level (up to around 18 years) and offers a broad range of academic subjects in small class groups. Rathdown provides seven-day boarding for pupils aged 10 – 18 years old and allows the boarders the option of returning home at weekends or remaining at the school to avail of the weekend activities. The school also runs a dedicated international programme for overseas students and short-term boarding options for day pupils. Rathdown is the only school in Ireland that uses a methodology called Mind Lab to develop thinking abilities and life skills through strategy games.

== Extracurricular activities ==
=== Model United Nations ===
For over 20 years, Rathdown School has been involved in Model United Nations (MUN). Rathdown was the first all-girls’ secondary school in Ireland to host an MUN Conference, RADMUN.

=== Sport ===
The school's sports facilities consist of hockey pitches, including a new, world-class, water-based hockey pitch, the Merrion Fleet Arena, tennis courts, outdoor basketball and netball courts, an indoor sports hall, athletics track and tartan cricket crease.

The major winter sports are hockey and basketball and the major summer sports are tennis, athletics and cricket.

=== Charity ===
Rathdown students participate in An Gaisce, the National Challenge Award from the President of Ireland to young people. Annually, Rathdown sends a team of students and staff to Romania, to volunteer with Habitat for Humanity Ireland to help build houses for local families.

Students Unite for Children’s Health (SUCH) was created by Rathdown pupils to raise funds for charities.

== Notable alumnae ==
- Anne Yeats (Hillcourt), painter, costume and designer, daughter of William Butler Yeats and Georgie Hyde-Lees. Later taught at The Hall School.
- Megan Taylor (The Hall), figure skater and youngest Winter Olympics competitor, representing GB at the age of 11 (1932).
- Jennifer Johnston (Park House), novelist.
- Camille Souter RHA (Glengara Park), artist.
- Noelle Middleton (Hillcourt), actress.
- Annette Jocelyn Otway-Ruthven (The Hall), medieval historian and one of the earliest female academics appointed at Trinity College Dublin.
- Joan Hanham, Baroness Hanham (née Brownlow Spark) (Hillcourt), CBE, Mayor of Kensington and Chelsea.
- Vivienne McKechnie (The Hall), poet.
- Ruth Frances Long (Glengara Park and Rathdown), fantasy and romance novelist.
- Rosanna Davison, (Rathdown), Miss World 2003 and daughter of Chris de Burgh.
- Virginia McGrath (née Conolly-Carew) (Rathdown), equestrian Olympian, competed in the Three-Day Event in Atlanta in 1996, and in Sydney in 2000.
- Tamsen McGarry (Rathdown), alpine skier and first woman to represent Ireland at the Winter Olympics (2002).
- Kirsten McGarry (Rathdown), alpine skier and first woman to represent Ireland at successive Winter Olympics (2006 and 2010).
- Saskia Tidey (Rathdown), sailor and Olympian (2016).
- Jodie McCann (Rathdown), distance runner and Olympian (2024).
