= IÉ 8200 Class =

Class of Irish electric multiple unit

Iarnród Éireann 8200 Class
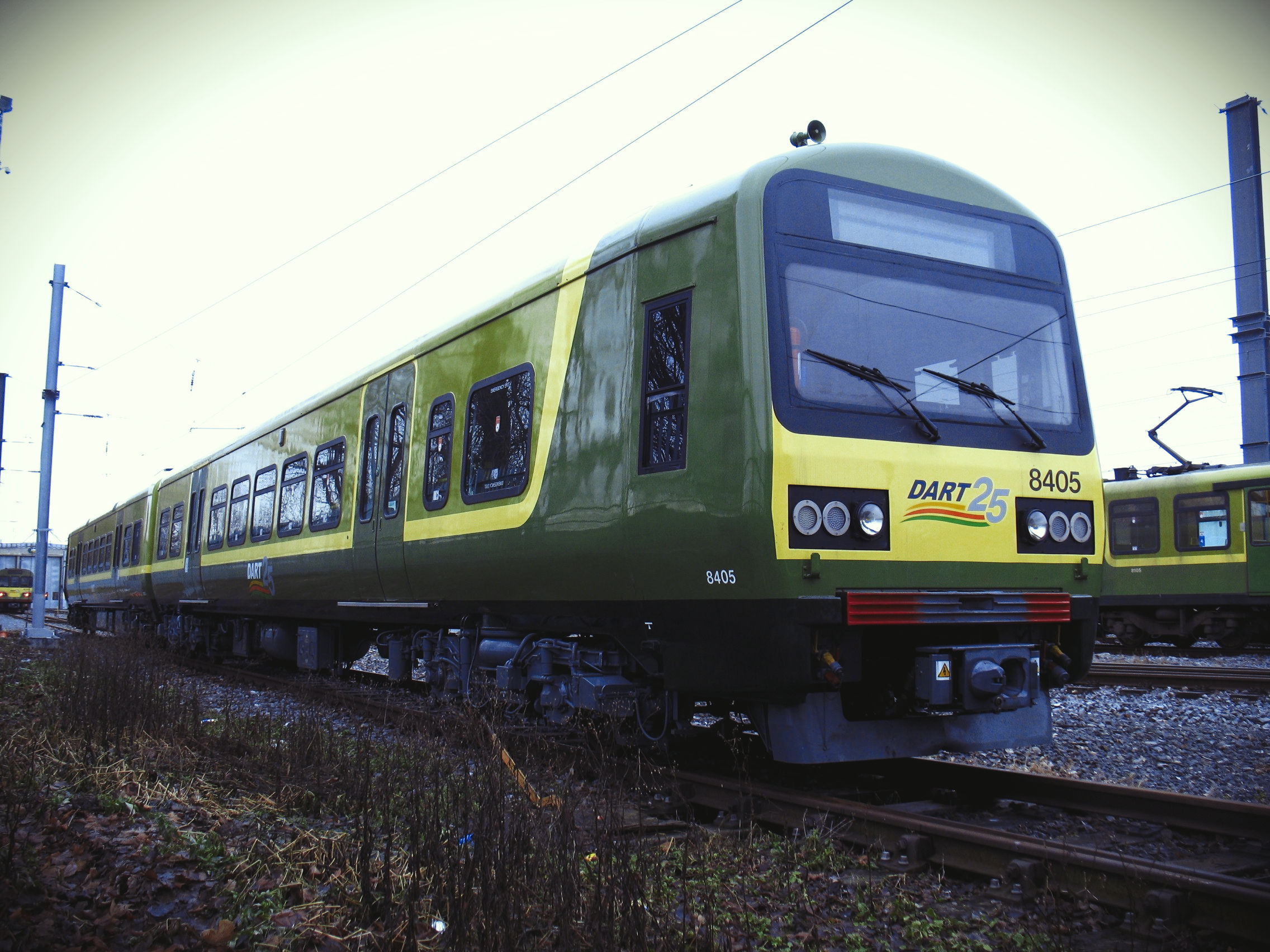
- 8405 at Fairview TMD
- Stock type: Electric Multiple Unit
- In service: 2000 – 2009 (Intermittent service)
- Manufacturer: Alstom
- Constructed: 1999 – 2000
- Scrapped: 2025
- Number built: 5 trainsets
- Number preserved: 1.5, front half of 8401, 8405 for fire and rescue training.
- Number scrapped: 7.5, including rear of 8401
- Formation: 2 cars per trainset: DM-DT
- Fleet numbers: DM: 8201 – 8205; DT: 8401 – 8405
- Operator: DART

Specifications
- Maximum speed: 110 km/h (68 mph)
- Electric system: 1,500 V DC Overhead wires
- Current collection: Pantograph
- Track gauge: 1,600 mm (5 ft 3 in) (See Rail gauge in Ireland)

The Iarnród Éireann 8200 Class were electric multiple units built for the Dublin Area Rapid Transit (DART). There were five two-car sets, each with a power car and a trailer car. They were numbered in the sequence 820X+840X. 820X units are power cars while 840X units are driving trailers.

== History ==
The five trains were ordered from Alstom in 1998. They were built in Spain and delivery was completed in 2000. The units were able to work in multiple with the older 8100 Class and also operated in multiple with the 8500 and 8510 Classes.

The five members of this class spent long periods out of service, the most recent being from summer 2007 until March 2008. Following a brief return to service of all coaches with the exception of 8204/8404, all units were withdrawn from service yet again in February 2009, with Iarnród Éireann citing frequent breakdowns and small seating as their reason for early withdrawal. They were stabled in Fairview DART depot during these periods of being out of service. In 2012 the units were tendered for sale, but were not sold.

They remained decommissioned at Inchicore Works, clear of catenary until reportedly around October 2023, when 8401 was repainted and cut in half for use at NTA's Wayfinding Centre in Glasnevin, Dublin. in March 2025 8405 was moved to Northern Ireland Fire & Rescue Service new Learning & Development College. The remaining members of the class were scrapped between April and July 2025.

== Fleet details ==
Class	Operator	Number	Year built	Cars per set	Unit nos.	Withdrawn	Scrapped	Notes
8200 Class	DART	5	1999-2000	2	8201/8401 – 8205/8405	2006-2009	October 2023 (8201/8401 only)	All stored at Inchicore railway works/Inchicore Works (off rails), except 8401 was cut in half in November 2023.

== See also ==
- Multiple Units of Ireland
