= Dúnmharú ar an Dart =

Irish language 1989 crime novel

Dúnmharú ar an DART
- Author: Ruaidhrí Ó Báille
- Original title: Dúnmharú ar an DART
- Language: Irish
- Genre: Crime
- Publisher: Clo Iar-Chonnachta Teo
- Publication date: 1989
- Publication place: Ireland
- Media type: Print
- Pages: 64
- ISBN: 1874700052
- Followed by: An Tobar

Dúnmharú ar an DART is an Irish language crime novel written by Ruaidhrí Ó Báille, first published in 1989. The title translates to English as 'Murder on the DART'. The novel follows the exploits of a teacher, Niall O'Brien, as he travels through Europe investigating the murder of his wife and having weird adventures.

== Summary ==
The novel starts with the main character, Niall, on a DART train in Dublin on an extraordinarily cold day. He was late so, naturally, he missed his usual train and had boarded the next. Niall is a schoolteacher who hopes to become the vice principal of the school at which he works. On the DART, there is a man beside with exactly the same briefcase as him. All of a sudden, the man falls to the ground, dead. The train stops and someone takes the man to hospital.

Niall picks up (what he thinks is) his case and continues to school. On entering the school he sees the principal, Biggles. Biggles advises Niall to go home as school was cancelled due to the weather. When Niall arrives home, he opens his case to find £1,000,000 inside. He screams and his wife, Máire, comes downstairs.
