= Stella G. Mew =

Irish educator (1942–2022)

- Born: 1942
- Died: 2022 (aged 79–80)
- Education: Trinity College Dublin (1966)

Stella G. Mew (1942–2022) was an Irish educator, headmistress, and CEO of the Yeats Society.

== Life ==
Stella Mew was the daughter of Ronald George Gillman Mew (1905–1996), an army officer, and Maureen Carmine Palmer (1903–1978), and with her brother Clive Ernest (1936–2013) she grew up at Shirley, Chapelizod, near the Phoenix Park in Dublin. She graduated from Trinity College Dublin in 1966.

== Career ==
Stella Mew first taught at Alexandra College and Park House School in Dublin, before moving to Heathfield School in Berkshire and then becoming head of the English department at Clarendon School in Wales. In 1972, she was appointed as headmistress of Hillcourt in Glenageary. The following year, Mew became principal of the newly-formed Rathdown School. She was principal for the next 30 years, retiring in 2002.

After retirement, she worked with Taylor University, Indiana, on the development of an Irish literature strand within an Anglo-Irish Studies programme. In 2005, she was invited to become CEO of the Yeats Society in County Sligo, which has run an annual Yeats Summer School for scholars since 1960.

She spoke about her early love of Yeats, her discovery of his writing, her regular attendance at lectures given by Yeats scholar and Yeats Society Director Dr TR Henn at Trinity, and her first visit to the summer school, in an episode of the RTE Radio 1 show 'Sunday Miscellany' in 2021.

Stella Mew died in October 2022. Her funeral took place in St Paul's Church in Glenageary, and her funeral cortege made a last lap of the grounds of Rathdown School.
