= Sallynoggin =

Suburb of Dublin, Ireland

Sallynoggin An Naigín (Irish)
- Suburb
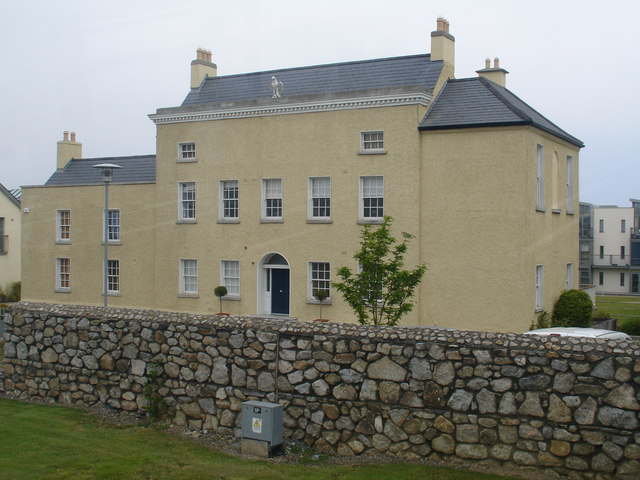
- Eaglewood House (built c. 1760) on Rochestown Avenue

- Location in Dublin Sallynoggin (Ireland)
- Coordinates: 53°16′01″N 6°09′00″W
- Country: Ireland
- Province: Leinster
- County: County Dublin

Population (2006)
  - Urban: 6,283
- Time zone: UTC+0 (WET)
  - Summer (DST): UTC+1 (IST (WEST))
- Eircode routing key: A96
- Telephone area code: +353(0)1

Sallynoggin (Irish: An Naigín) is an area of Dublin in Ireland, in Dún Laoghaire–Rathdown, County Dublin. The area consists mainly of former local authority housing built between the late 1940s and the mid-1950s by the Corporation of Dún Laoghaire.

== Location and boundaries ==
On early 20th-century maps, Sallynoggin and Glenageary are indicated as being the same place; however, with the development of the local authority housing estate on the townlands of Honeypark and Thomastown, Sallynoggin became a distinct area.

The boundary of the former borough of Dún Laoghaire, which was dissolved in 1994, excluded a section of the local authority housing, mainly Pearse Villas and a part of Pearse Street which were in the Dublin County Council area. The entire area of Sallynoggin, Rochestown, and the surrounding areas was included in the new county of Dún Laoghaire–Rathdown formed in 1994.

It is in the Dáil constituency of Dún Laoghaire.

== Etymology ==
The Irish Placenames Commission has researched the origin and meaning of Sallynoggin as a placename. In fact, the name is not Irish at all but English deriving from the "sally noggins" which referred to old timber-frame houses that were known to be situated there. The Irish name for Sallynoggin is Saile an Chnocain. The modern Irish word for noggin is the phonetic "naigín" hence "An Naigín" (The Noggin) as it is commonly called. More than likely this is a placename of English origin. Examples of the word naggin or noggin were collected in Hiberno-English, meaning ‘a wooden vessel’. The origin of the word is unclear to lexicographers. The following meaning of the word noggin also appears in the English Dialect Dictionary, ‘the clay and sticks, or bricks used to fill the interstices of half-timbered houses’. This is a more likely explanation of ‘sallynoggins’; in other words, sally-rods may have been used in the construction of the houses.

== History ==
A long straight road connecting Rochestown Avenue and Glenageary was laid out in the eighteenth century and in 1787 was known as Woodpark Avenue, now Sallynoggin Road. Woodpark was the name of an old eighteenth-century house which is now part of the Sallynoggin Inn pub. In the 1830s the west side of Sallynoggin Road was lined with low, small-windowed thatched cottages. As of 1988 there were still ruins of some houses, probably built for employees of the Glenageary House estate, standing opposite the pub. In 1899 Kingstown Urban District Council became established with a jurisdiction including the villages of Sandycove, Glasthule, Glenageary, Sallynoggin and Monkstown. In 1904 the Kingstown Urban District Council sought tenders for artisans dwellings to be built in Sallynoggin. These subsequent houses, designed by architect William Caldbeck, became the first of a huge local authority building programme which eventually produced the largely residential area of Sallynoggin as it appears today. Sallynoggin Villas, a group of two-storey, terraced houses near Glenageary roundabout were amongst the earliest houses produced, as were those on Sarsfield Street.

By 1950 the population of the area had increased to such an extent that it was considered prudent to build a church. The Church of Our Lady of Victories was opened in 1955 at a cost of £140,000, constructed in concrete in an Italian-Renaissance revival style. The distinctive steeple of the church can be seen for many miles around. Eighteenth-century houses of note in the area include Somerton Lodge, The Cedars, Woodpark and Kensington.

== Amenities ==
There are playing fields on either side of Sallynoggin Road with a clubhouse for St Joseph's Boys AFC football club on Pearse Road.

There are both large and small retail units in Sallynoggin, including on Sallynoggin Road, Pearse Street and Church Place.

Sallynoggin has a primary school, St. Kevin's National School, located on Pearse Street, from which some pupils move on to the nearby Holy Child Community School. The former Technical School on Pearse Street is now the Sallynoggin College of Further Education and offers third-level courses. Rathdown School, a Church of Ireland girls school is located here too.

Sallynoggin Youth and Community Centre, which opened in October 2008, offers youth groups, youth clubs, under 10's group, a senior citizens group, estate management, local voluntary groups and Sallynoggin Neighbourhood Watch.

The Dublin Bus and Go-Ahead Ireland routes which serve the Sallynoggin area include the 7/A (Loughlinstown Park/Brides Glen Luas stop to Mountjoy Square), 7b (Shankill to Mountjoy Square), and 45a (Kilmacanogue to Dún Laoghaire) and 111 (Brides Glen Luas stop to Dalkey). Glenageary Train Station is nearby.

== Religion ==
The Roman Catholic Parish of Sallynoggin covers the estates of Sallynoggin, Rochestown, Beechwood and Thomastown. The Catholic church is situated in the centre of the parish and was opened in 1955 and dedicated to Our Lady of Victories. Prior to the building of this church a small church dedicated to St. Kevin was located on the west side of Sallynoggin Road (Townland of Honeypark) serving the village of Sallynoggin from 1927.

== People ==
Former or current residents of Sallynoggin have included:

- Raymond McGrath (1903–1977), Australian-born architect who for the greater part of his career was Principal Architect for the Office of Public Works in Ireland, lived at Somerton House
- Sir Boyle Roche (1736–1807), Irish politician lived in Woodpark House in the 1780s
- Dustin the Turkey, Irish television character comes from the area.
- Stephen Jolly, Australian socialist politician and two-time Mayor of Yarra Council, Melbourne. Lived at 27 Pearse Park from 1962 to 1977.

== See also ==
- List of towns and villages in Ireland

== Sources ==
- Pearson, Peter (1998). Between the Mountains and the Sea. Dun Laoghaire-Rathdown County. Dublin: The O'Brien Press. ISBN 0-86278-582-0.
- Pearson, Peter (1981). Dun Laoghaire Kingstown. Dublin: The O'Brien Press. ISBN 0-86278-256-2.
