= CIÉ 8100 Class =

Electric multiple unit train used in Ireland

Córas Iompair Éireann 8100 Class
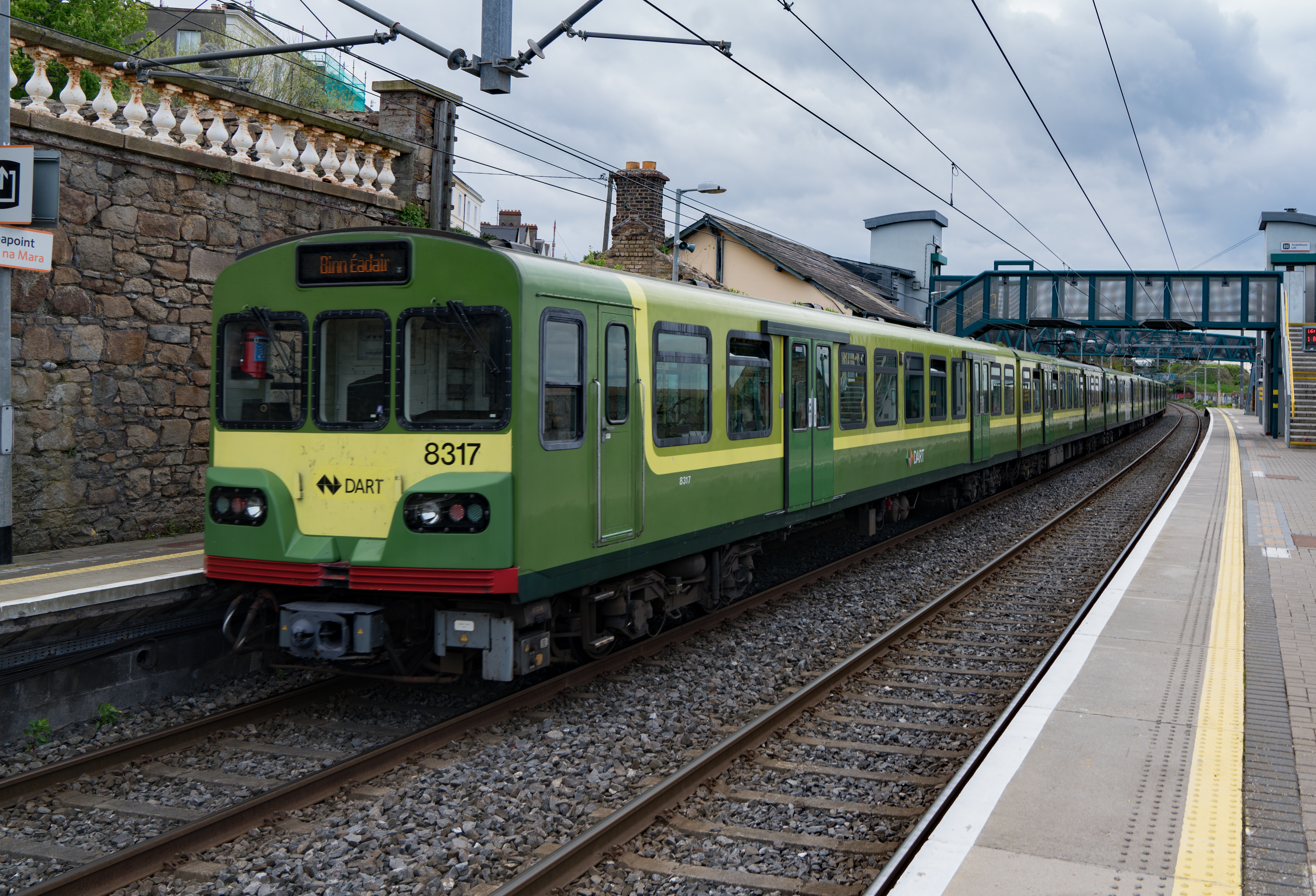
- Refurbished unit 8317 at Seapoint railway station in April 2017.

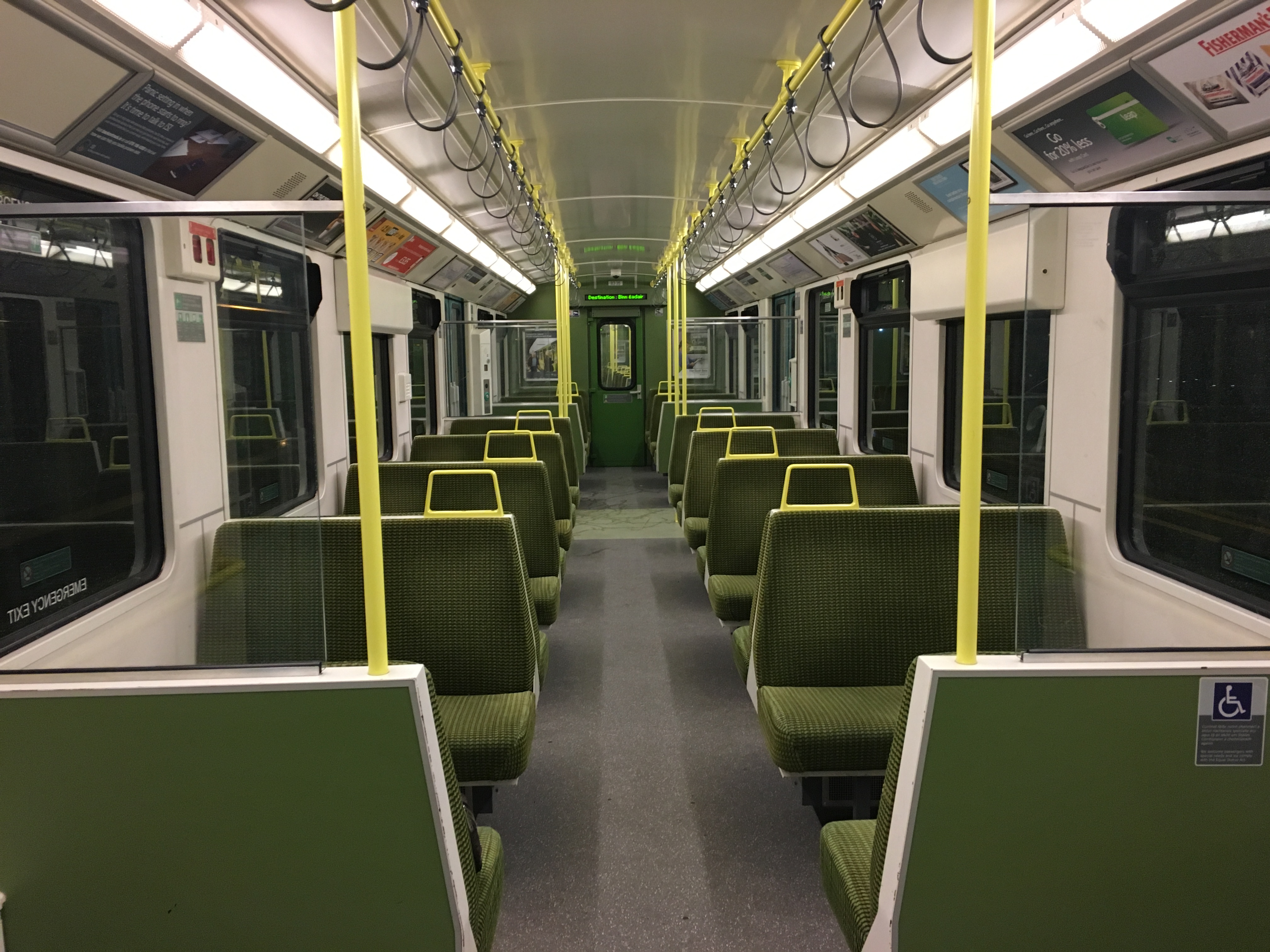
- Refurbished interior
- In service: 23 July 1984 – present
- Manufacturer: Linke-Hofmann-Busch
- Replaced: 2600 Class
- Constructed: 1983 – 1984
- Refurbished: 2005 – 2007 (at Siemens, Leipzig, Germany)
- Scrapped: 2001 (2)
- Number built: 40 sets (80 cars)
- Number in service: 38 sets
- Number scrapped: 2 sets
- Formation: 2 cars per trainset: DM-DT
- Fleet numbers: DM: 8101 – 8140; DT: 8301 – 8340
- Capacity: 128 seated
- Operator: DART
- Depot: Fairview DART depot
- Lines served: Howth – Bray; Malahide – Greystones

Specifications
- Car body construction: Steel
- Car length: 20.49 m (67.2 ft)
- Width: 2.9 m (9 ft 6 in)
- Maximum speed: 100 km/h (62 mph)
- Traction system: GEC Traction Thyristor Control
- Traction motors: GEC Traction G314BY DC Motor
- Power output: 130 kW (continuous)
- Acceleration: 0.92 m/s^2
- Deceleration: 0.78 m/s^2
- Electric system: 1,500 V DC Overhead lines
- Current collection: Pantograph
- Bogies: LHB
- Coupling system: Scharfenberg
- Multiple working: 3 sets (2 sets or 4 sets (at peak times))
- Track gauge: 5 ft 3 in (1,600 mm)

The CIÉ 8100 class (also known as the 8300 class) were the first electric multiple units used on the Dublin Area Rapid Transit (DART) system. Built by GEC and Linke-Hofmann-Busch in 1983, they are two-car units, and were the only units used on the DART before the arrival of the 8200 Class. 40 two-car sets were delivered, numbered 8101/8301 to 8140/8340. 81XX units are power cars while 83XX units are unpowered driving trailers. The driving cabs are full width, with the inner ends of the cars connected by gangways. The power cars are always at the northern end of the train, while the driving trailers are always at the southern end.

== History ==
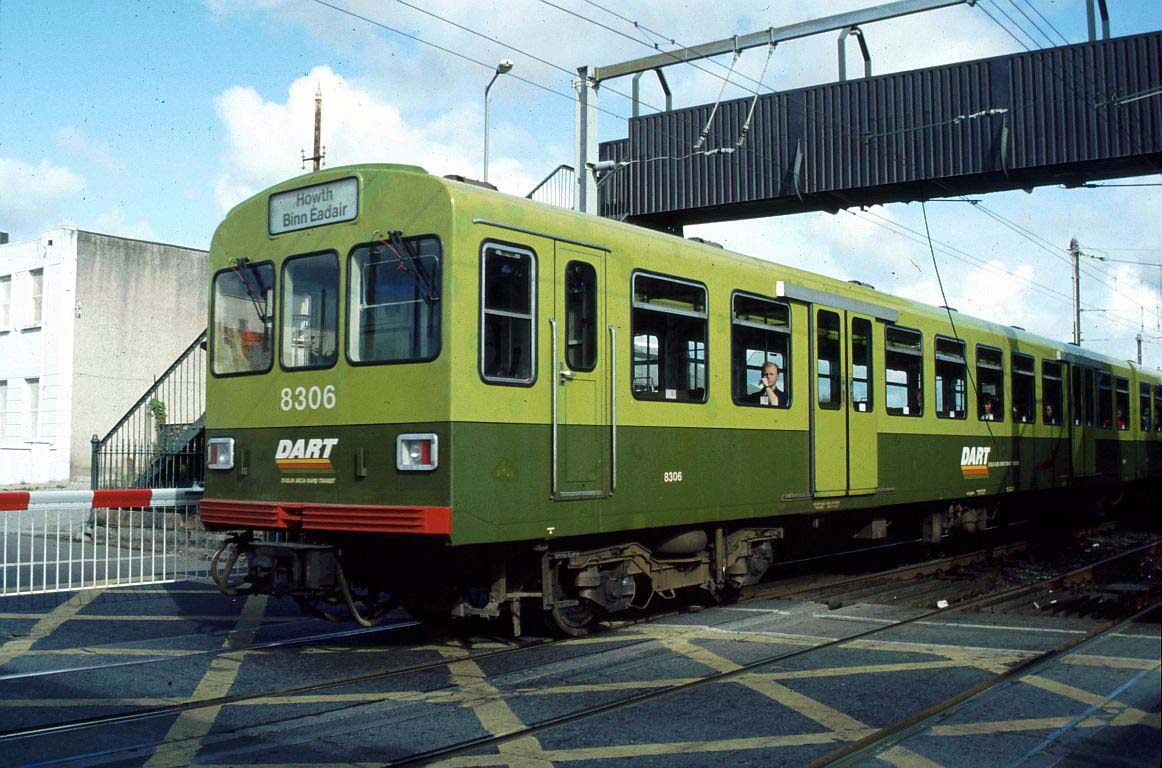
Unrefurbished DART EMU (8306) at Bray Daly railway station

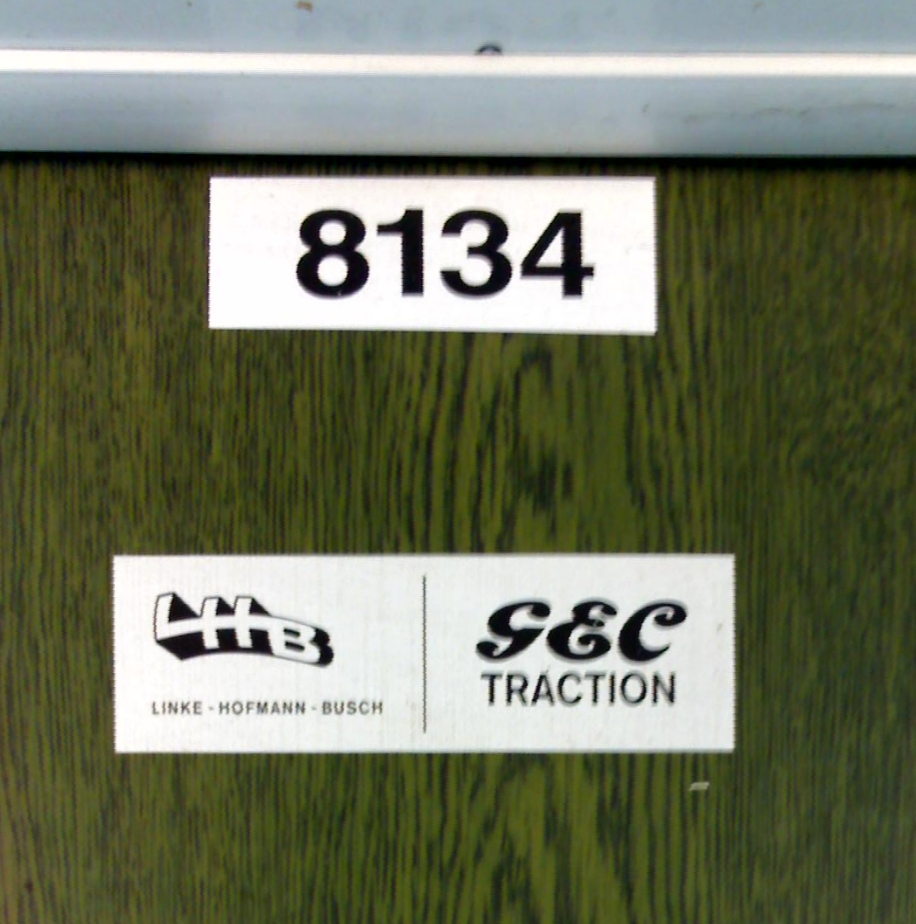
LHB & GEC logos in 8100 class units

The original seating layout consisted of 72 seats per coach with 16 tip up seats at the doors, giving 176 seats in total. With increasing passenger numbers and the heavy spring in the tip up seats becoming a possible source of injury, the tip seats were removed in the late 1980s. As a result of ever continuing passenger demand in the late 1990s extra standing room was provided through the removal of 16 seats from the 83XX unpowered driving trailers, reducing seating capacity to 56 giving a 2 car unit a total of 128 seats.

When the 8600 Class units entered service from 2001, a number of 8100 Class units were modified to make up six car sets with them. Since the refurbishment detailed below this is no longer possible. The units concerned were 8101, 8102, 8108, 8114 to 8118, 8120, 8122, 8123, 8126, 8135 and 8137.

All of the remaining units returned to service in 2007 and 2008 following refurbishment by Siemens. This included the installation of modified marker lights, removal of some seats to add more standing space giving all coaches 64 seats and space for a wheelchair, installation of an electronic passenger information system, new wheel slide protection equipment and digital traction control to replace the outdated analogue system and installation of a door closing warning beeper. The units were originally limited to running in sets of up to six cars and the refurbishment was also supposedly intended to allow the units to operate in 8-car sets, although some unmodified LHB sets had operated in 8-car formations during 2007.

As with other DART units, they are maintained at Fairview depot, as well as being stabled at Bray. By January 2013, as reported in the ITG Magazine "Irish Mail" sets 8103, 8105, 8113 and 8138 were temporarily stored out of service. All these units were returned to revenue service except 8103–8303, which remained in storage not having run since 18 August 2010, however this unit returned to revenue service on 20 September 2018.

In 2023, Irish Rail issued a tender to investigate the option of extending the service life of the class until 2034, 50 years since their introduction in to service, however the costs of keeping the trains in service was judged to be prohibitive and in 2024 Irish Rail sought approval to purchase 100 carriages of new 90000 class trains to replace the 8100 class.

== Accidents and incidents ==
Four cars (8110-8310 and 8136-8336 were scrapped after suffering serious damage in a fire at Fairview depot on 14 July 2001.

On 13 September 2017 the 16:45 service from Howth to Bray, formed of a six-car 8100 Class unit was derailed on a set of points at Dún Laoghaire station. The leading bogie of the first car, 8308, derailed. Two passengers received medical attention but there were no injuries. There was widespread criticism on social media over Irish Rail's response to the incident both from passengers delayed on other services and the derailed train itself due to the lack of information and the time it took to evacuate the derailed train.

== Fleet details ==
Class	Operator	Number	Year built	Cars per Set	Unit nos.	Notes
8100 Class	DART	38 (formerly 40)	1983-1984	2	8101 – 8109; 8111 – 8135; 8137 – 8140	8110 and 8136 scrapped

== See also ==
- Multiple Units of Ireland
- Dublin Area Rapid Transit
