= Hillcourt =

Irish historic house

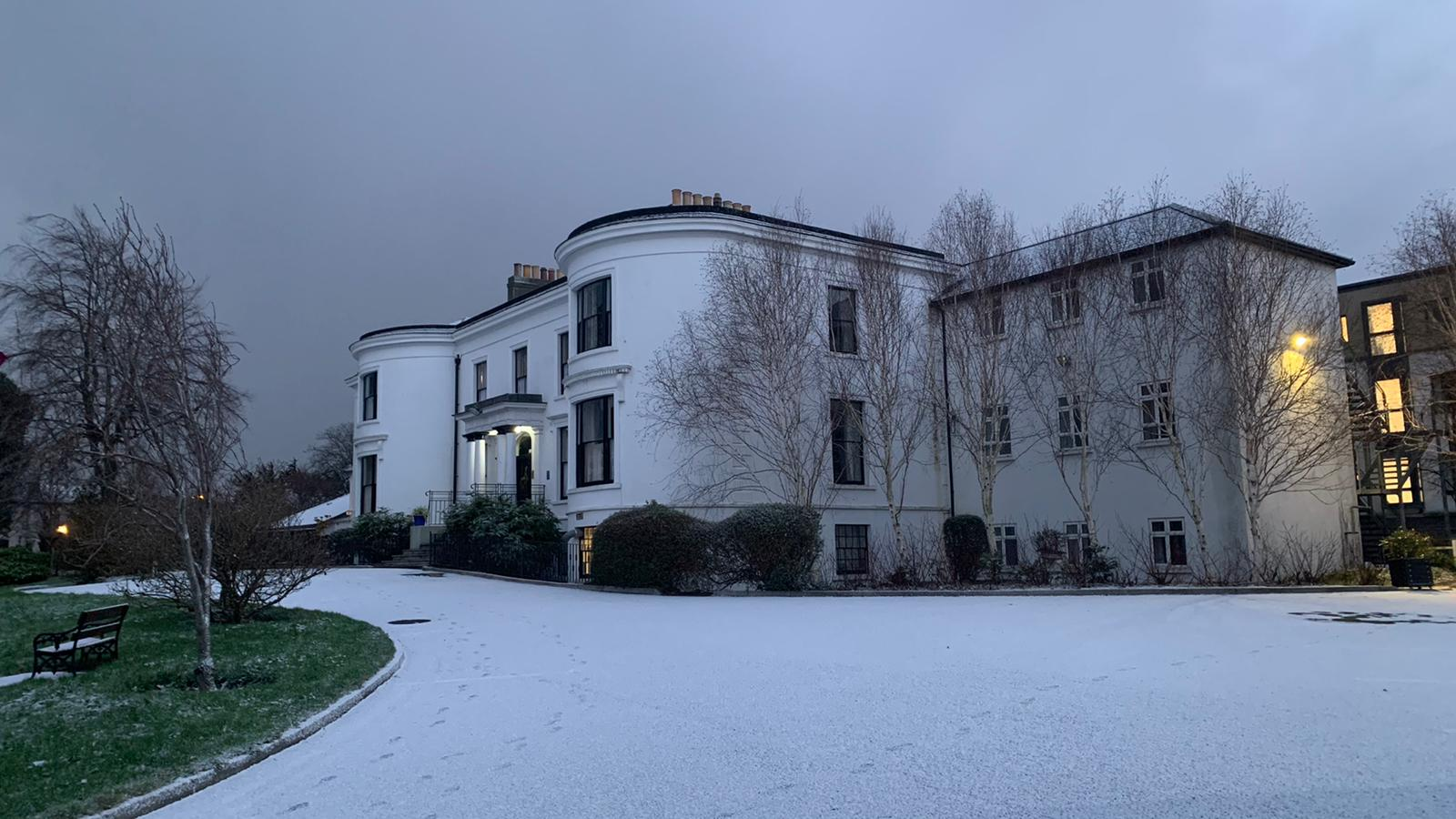
Hillcourt House in the snow, January 2021

Hillcourt is a Regency house situated in Glenageary, approximately 12km from Dublin city centre, in Ireland. Hillcourt was originally a private home named Innismore and in 1919 it became Hillcourt, a Church of Ireland boarding school for girls. The school merged with two other schools in 1973 to form the present-day Rathdown School.

== Origins and history ==
Innismore was built around 1830, and has been described by Peter Pearson as "one of the most impressive remaining houses in Glenageary". The striking features of the house's white stucco exterior are its Doric portico, with four columns; its Wyatt bow windows; and details including stucco lyres over the hall-floor windows. Internal features include a hall richly ornamented with a monochrome painted frieze showing Arcadian landscapes, and a Greek key pattern. The newel posts on the staircase are decorated with a monogram S, representing the Synnott family who lived in the house from 1869 to 1919. The Synnotts also added the Edwardian billiard room in the 1890s, with its beautiful pitch pine roof, carved fireplace, coloured glass windows and window seat. The billiard room was used as the Big School Room by Hillcourt (as it was later by Rathdown School), and is still known as the BSR even though it is now used as a dormitory.

WP Toone invited Gladys and Phyllis Palmer, two sisters then teaching science and English at Cheltenham Ladies College, to come to Ireland to take charge of academic and pastoral matters at the new school. The Palmers (and a third sister, Eileen, who later joined them to teach elocution) were sisters of Geoffrey Molyneux Palmer, a composer who set some of Joyce's poems to music. Once some necessary alterations had been made to the building to accommodate the incoming girls, Hillcourt opened in May 1919, with 32 pupils, learning, along with their core academic subjects, gymnastics, dancing, art, piano, French and German, and playing tennis, lacrosse, and hockey.

In 1928 Hillcourt was one of the first two girls' schools in Ireland to introduce lacrosse (the other being the French School in Bray), and, as well as school training and matches against other schools, the Hillcourt lacrosse field was used for trials for the Irish women's lacrosse teams, and for hosting international matches. The pupils themselves competed annually against other schools for the Lacrosse Shield, now on permanent display at Rathdown School. The East Wing was built in 1925, including the Lower Schoolroom, staff sitting room, and two sick rooms. Three gardeners cultivated vegetables, fruit and flowers, and kept hens, to supply the school kitchens with eggs.

Eileen Palmer, who had been looking after Geoffrey as multiple sclerosis kept him increasingly unable to walk, died suddenly in 1949, and Gladys had to retire to take her place in their house in Sandycove. Phyllis ("Miss Phyllis") continued as headmistress until a replacement could be found, and then she, too, retired, in 1950. The Palmers were succeeded by Helen Tobias, then AE Richards, Heather Lowry, and, in 1972, Stella G. Mew.

Hillcourt celebrated its golden jubilee year in 1969. Four years later, in 1973, it merged with two other schools, the Hall School, Monkstown, and Park House School, Donnybrook, to form Rathdown School, which still operates from the original Hillcourt site, including using the original Hillcourt House as a boarding house, and a newly-built boarding and music block called Innismore. The merger was overseen by Stella Mew, as was a further amalgamation with Glengara Park in 1987. Stella Mew continued as principal of Rathdown School for the next thirty years.

The celebration of Hillcourt Day, which Hillcourt marked every year on 15 March to remember the founding of the school, was revived by Rathdown School in 2019, to mark the 100th anniversary of the foundation of Hillcourt, and 100 years of education on the school campus.

== Present day ==
Rathdown School still operates on the Hillcourt campus. Rathdown's current head of school is Alan Cox. In August 2022, boys were admitted throughout the Junior School, and in August 2023, at the start of Rathdown's 50th anniversary year, boys were admitted throughout the Senior School, so that the whole school is now co-educational.

== Notable alumnae ==
- Anne Yeats, painter, costume and stage designer, daughter of William Butler Yeats and Georgie Hyde-Lees.
- Noelle Middleton, actress.
- Dr Stephanie Saville, anaesthetist and pioneer in palliative pain relief.

== Notable teachers ==
- Stella G. Mew
