= Fairview DART depot =

Railway depot in Dublin

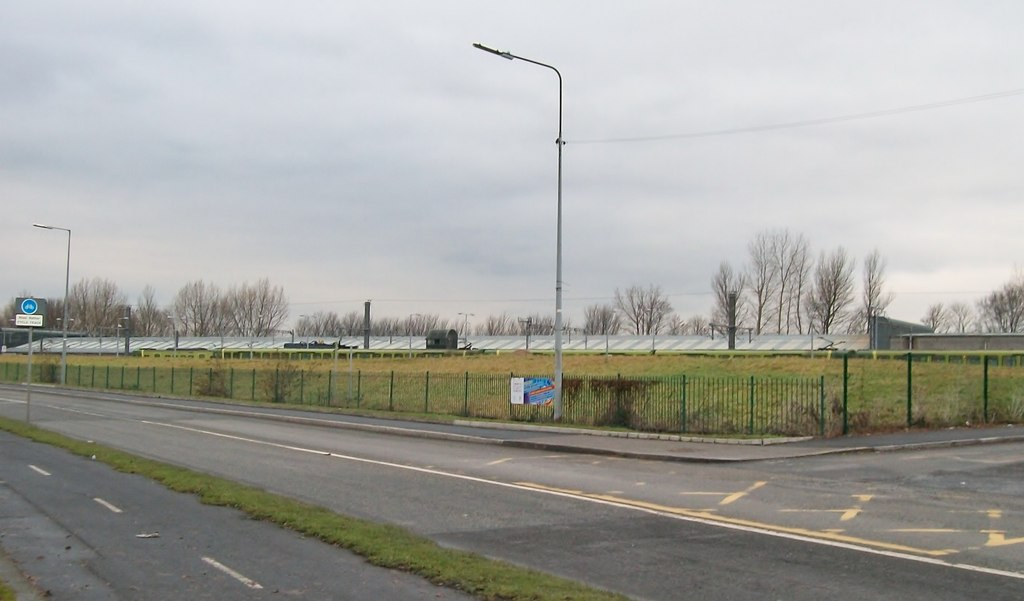
- Fairview DART depot seen from Alfie Byrne Road
- Interactive map of Fairview DART depot

Location
- Location: Clontarf Road, Dublin 3, D03 K6E8, Ireland

Characteristics
- Owner: Iarnród Éireann
- Type: EMU
- Rolling stock: CIÉ 8100 Class; IE 8500, 8510 and 8520 Classes

History
- Opened: 1958
- Original: Great Northern Railway

Fairview DART depot is a railway depot used for servicing electrical multiple units on the Dublin Area Rapid Transit system.

== History ==
The depot and its associated sidings were originally part of the Great Northern Railway's (GNR) Diesel Railcar depot. This opened in 1958 to service the GNR's AEC railcars and was Ireland's first purpose-built diesel traction depot. When the GNR was nationalised in 1958 the railcar depot was taken over by CIÉ. It was later used for CIÉ's push-pull trains before being converted for the new DART EMUs in the early 1980s.

In 2001, a fire caused severe damage to the depot, which put 30 DART carriages out of service. Four carriages were damaged beyond repair.

The depot was expanded with additional sidings in 2005. As part of the DART+ project the depot will be modified to service the new 90000 Class trains.

== Facilities ==
The depot is located just south of Clontarf Road DART station on the Dublin-Belfast railway line. It has a three-road shed, train wash and sidings. Heavy maintenance on DART units is carried out at Inchicore Works. There is no wheel lathe at Fairview so 29000 Class commuter DMUs tow DART trains to the Drogheda Commuter depot for wheel turning.

== See also ==
- Multiple Units of Ireland
