= Vivienne McKechnie =

Irish writer and poet

- Born: Vivienne Darling; Dublin
- Known for: Poetry

Vivienne McKechnie is an Irish writer and poet based in Limerick. She has also been an organiser of the Limerick Literary Festival.

== Biography ==
Born Vivienne Darling in Dublin to Dr. Desmond Darling and Audrey Darling (née Butler), she had three sisters. McKechnie attended The Hall School, Monkstown, and got her degree in Trinity College Dublin. Later McKechnie completed her Creative Writing MA in the University of Limerick. She went on to become a teacher and spent four years in Kenya before moving to Limerick. McKechnie wrote and began to have her poems published. Her debut collection was published in 2013. At least one of her works has been the poem on the Irish Leaving Certificate exams. McKechnie was also selected for inclusion in the Windharp Poetry Anthology for the centenary of 1916.

McKechnie teaches Creative Writing in Limerick and has been a member of the Kate O’Brien Committee, lately the Limerick Literary Festival though previously called the Kate O’Brien Weekend as well as a judge in the Kate O’Brien award. McKechnie was also on the Limerick City Of Culture Committee. McKechnie was the editor of Dream of a City, An Anthology of Contemporary Poetry from Limerick.

== Personal life ==
McKechnie married her husband after meeting him while in University. The couple had three children, Hannah, Scott and Jessica.

== Bibliography ==
- A Butterfly's Wing 2013
- Dream of a City, An Anthology of Contemporary Poetry from Limerick City of Culture 2014, ed.
