= R827 road (Ireland) =

Road in Ireland

R827 road
- Bóthar R827
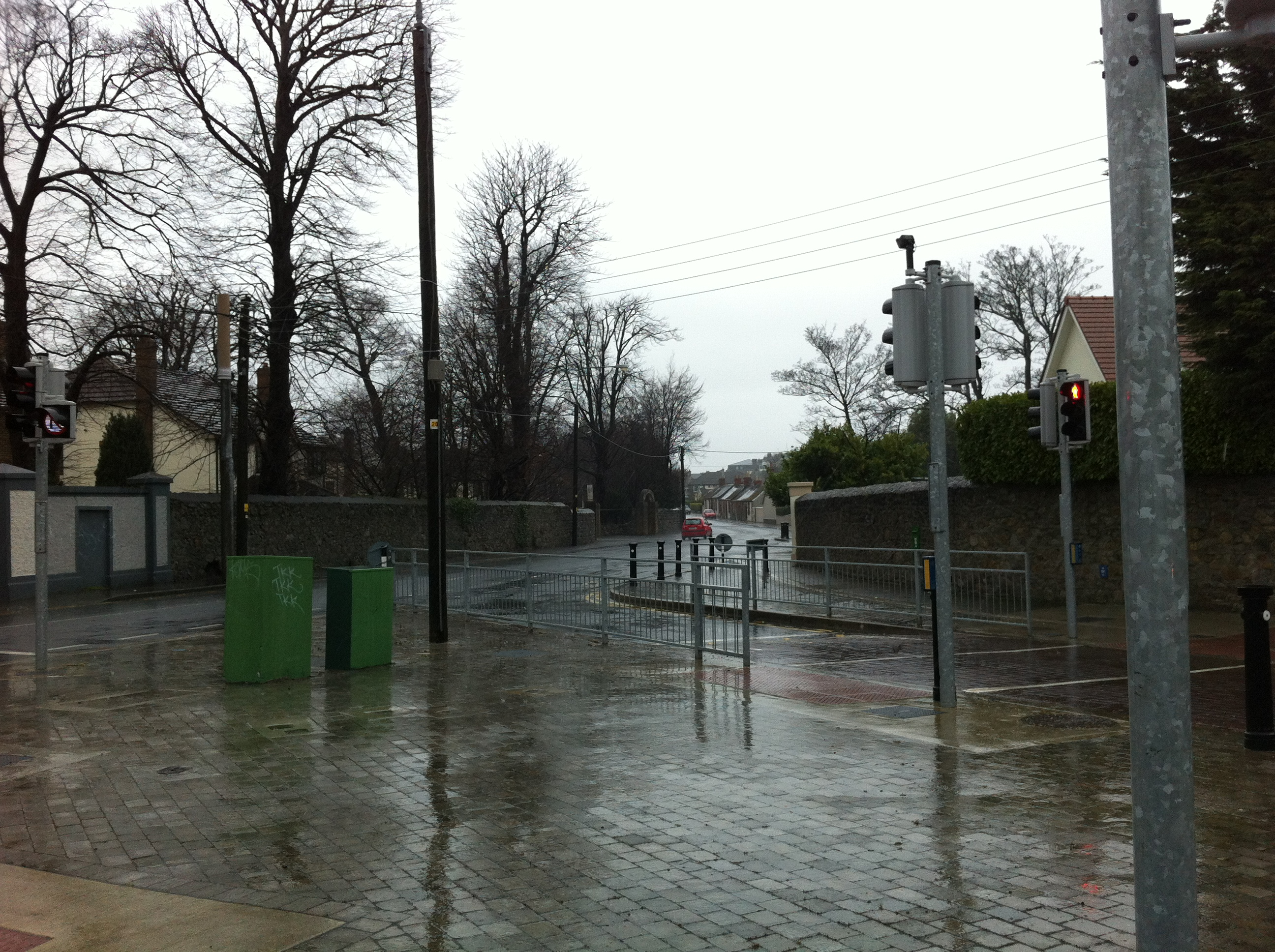
- Stradbrook Road, at the junction of the R827 and R828

Route information
- Length: 3.3 km (2.1 mi)

Location
- Country: Ireland
- Primary destinations: Dún Laoghaire–Rathdown; R113 (Newtownpark Avenue); R828 (Stradbrook Road); Deansgrange Road; R830 (Kill Lane); Clonkeen Road; N11 (Stillorgan Road)

Highway system
- Roads in Ireland; Motorways; Primary; Secondary; Regional

The R827 road is a regional road in Dún Laoghaire–Rathdown, Dublin, Ireland connecting Blackrock and Monkstown with the N11 (Stillorgan Road).

The official definition of the R827 from the Roads Act 1993 (Classification of Regional Roads) Order 2012 states:

R827: Blackrock - Cornelscourt, County Dublin

Between its junction with R113 at Newtownpark Avenue and its junction with N11 at Cabinteely Bypass via Stradbrook Road, Deansgrange Road and Clonkeen Road all in the county of Dún Laoghaire–Rathdown.

The road is 3.3 kilometres (2.1 mi) long.

== See also ==
- Roads in Ireland
- National primary road
- Regional road
