= Glenageary =

Suburb in Dublin, Ireland

Glenageary Gleann na gCaorach (Irish)
- Suburb
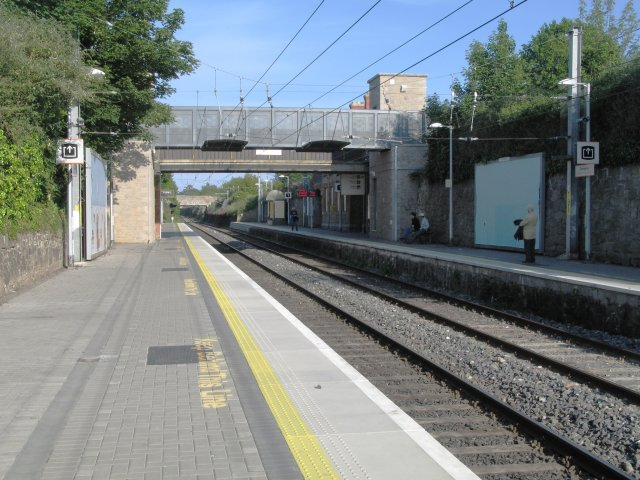
- Glenageary station

- Location in Dublin Glenageary (Ireland)
- Coordinates: 53°16′30″N 6°7′45″W
- Country: Ireland
- Province: Leinster
- County: County Dublin
- Local government area: Dún Laoghaire–Rathdown
- Time zone: UTC±0 (WET)
  - Summer (DST): UTC+1 (IST)
- Eircode routing key: A96
- Telephone area code: +353(0)1

Glenageary (Irish: Gleann na gCaorach, meaning 'Glen of the Sheep' [ˌɟlʲaːn̪ˠ n̪ˠə ˈɡeːɾˠə]) is an area on the Southside of Dublin, Ireland, within Dún Laoghaire–Rathdown. While it has no formal boundary, it is surrounded by the areas of Dalkey, Dún Laoghaire, Glasthule, Johnstown, Killiney and Sallynoggin.

On early 20th century maps, Glenageary and Sallynoggin are considered to be the same place and it was not until the building of local authority houses in the late 1940s and 1950s in the townlands of Honeypark and Thomastown by Dún Laoghaire Borough Corporation that a clear distinction between Sallynoggin and Glenageary was created.

The Roman Catholic Parish of Glasthule covers all of Glasthule and Sandycove together with Glenageary east of Upper Glenageary Road and south of Lower Glenageary Road. The Church of Ireland has a defined boundary for the Parish of Glenageary.

== History ==
Until the late 1940s, Glenageary, like much of the south County Dublin, consisted mostly of large manor estates - each comprising a large house, some woodland and cultivated or landscaped fields. Since then it has been extensively redeveloped. Most of the original manors have been demolished and low-density housing developments built.

Glenageary has one church, St Paul's at the junction of Adelaide and Silchester Roads, which is a (Church of Ireland) church. It was opened in 1868.

== Transport ==
The area is served by Dublin Bus, routes 7 (Every 30 minutes. 40 minutes on Sundays.) and 59 (every hour). Other routes nearby in Sallynoggin include the 7a, 45a and 111 although these vary in frequency and service periods. Glenageary has its own railway station which is served by Iarnród Éireann's DART that provides service between Greystones to the south, and Howth and Malahide to the north. Glenageary railway station opened on 1 November 1867.

== People ==
- Sinéad O'Connor and her novelist brother Joseph O'Connor spent some of their early lives in Glenageary
- Niall Connolly, one of the Colombia Three, spent his childhood in Glenageary
- Colm Ó Cíosóig, musician and drummer of My Bloody Valentine, is from Glenageary
- John Dowse was an Irish-born British Army medical officer in World Wars I and II.
- Raonaid Murray, a 17-year-old resident, was murdered on Silchester Road on 4 September 1999 near her home.

== See also ==
- List of towns and villages in Ireland
