= St Paul's Church, Glenageary =

St. Paul's Church
- St. Paul's Church, Glenageary
- St. Paul's Church
- 53.28188°N 6.12587°W
- Location: Silchester Road, Glenageary
- Country: Ireland
- Denomination: Anglicanism
- Website: glenageary.dublin.anglican.org

History
- Founded: 1821
- Consecrated: 8 July 1868

Architecture
- Architect: A.G Jones
- Architectural type: Church
- Style: Gothic Revival

Specifications
- Capacity: 500

Administration
- Diocese: Dublin and Glendalough
- Parish: St Paul's

Clergy
- Rector: Vacant

St Paul's Church in Glenageary, County Dublin, is a large parish of the Diocese of Dublin and Glendalough of the Church of Ireland. The building itself is a large one in the Gothic Revival style. The church has had a distinguished history of both rectors and curates, with many of them going on to senior posts in the Church of Ireland and further afield. The parish will be seeking a new Rector following the retirement of The Rev Gary Dowd on June 30th, 2026.

== History ==
The Church of St Paul Glenageary is one of seven churches that were built in the old Parish of Monkstown in County Dublin. The cost of its erection was provided out of a bequest by a Miss Shannon, a wealthy lady of Belfast, left by her to build a number of churches in or near Dublin. To this bequest are due Zion Church Rathgar, St Barnabas's, North Lotts Dublin and St Kevin's South Circular Road.

Construction of the main body of the church and rectangular chancel, along with the spire, was completed in 1868. On 3 January 1868, the Daily Express issued the following account:

"The new church at St Paul’s, Glenageary, was opened for public worship for the first time yesterday morning.

"The church of St Paul is of the gothic style of architecture and although not large, is extremely tasteful and imposing. The building measures 101 ft. 6 in. internally by 35 ft. 6 inches wide and 55 ft. 6 inches high to the ridge. It comprises a Nave and Chancel measuring 18 ft. 6 inches by 21 ft. It is in the Decorative style and has at the south west corner a tower and spire raising to a height of 120 ft. to the top of the iron Finial.

"The structure was erected by Mr. John Nolan of Dublin from the design of Mr. A Jones, Architect."

The consecration of the church was postponed until Sunday 8 July 1868 as the building had yet to be completed.

In 1869, the organ was installed, located at an unorthodox location at the eastern side of the rectangular chancel under the rose window (which has since been removed after the addition of the apse).

In 1872 the first bells were installed in the tower with the peal being completed some five years later. Construction of the transept and organ enclosure of the eastern side of the building was completed in 1898. Construction of the chancel apse was completed in 1913, resulting in the building form that currently exists.

The existing church building form expresses clearly the several alterations and extensions to the original, resulting in several volumes that are interconnected, but with each retaining their own identity. The original building was designed in an architectural style that was popular at that time, and reflects good design practice of the day. The steep pitched roofs, and the clear detailing and rough cut stonework tied together by strong horizontal banding creates a strong identity for the church.

Dry rot was discovered in the church in 1980/81 over the organ, which was then located in the chancel. At this time the plaster was removed from the walls in the nave and the previous lighting and heating system installed.

The organ was relocated to its present position in the side chapel in 1993. A number of changes were also made to the chancel, which was extended and made into a more flexible space. A robing room and parish office was created in the space vacated by the organ and a toilet installed at the back of the church. A universal access ramp was constructed in 2009.

== Parochial hall ==
The site for the parochial hall on Adelaide Road was obtained in 1910, with the building being opened in February 1912. The building remained in its original form until 1968 when an extension to its west side, to provide for a caretaker's apartment as well as additional meeting rooms and facilities, was added.

The sod was turned to begin construction work on a new parish centre within the grounds of the church on Sunday 19 March 2006. Obtaining planning permission was a torturous process which involved eight planning applications beginning in 2000. The new Parish Centre was officially opened by President Mary McAleese on Sunday 23 April 2007.

== Restoration work to church completed 2012-2013 ==
The cost of this major restoration work had amounted to €1.5 million. The bulk of this money came from reserves. There was money left following the sale of the old Parish Hall and the construction of the new parish centre. A house left to the parish by the late Odette Gatenby was sold and the proceeds added to the restoration fund. In the present economic climate the select vestry decided on a low-key approach to fund raising. An appeal was launched and to date this has raised just over €60,000. It was decided that it was important to ask parishioners to make a contribution if they were in a position to do so.

The church was closed for 41 weeks while the work was being carried out. During that time the congregation worshipped in the parish centre and over Christmas and New Year had a number of joint services with their neighbours in Christ Church, Dun Laoghaire. They returned to St Paul's on Mothering Sunday, 10 March 2013.

== The Restoration Project ==
In 2010, the Vestry, in consultation with its advisors, reduced the list of works to be carried out at the church to essential items – works necessary to protect and preserve the building fabric as well as the renewal of the heating and electrical installations, and ensuring compliance of the building with Safety and Building Regulations. Other works, which had been considered desirable but not essential, were omitted.

As with all maintenance work, it is difficult to prepare documentation that defines all necessary works, especially when the scope of works cannot be evaluated until areas of the building have been opened up for inspection. However, based on the reports from our consultants, and detailed inspections, our Design Team, led by fellow parishioner and conservation architect, Bryan Roe of Scott Tallon Walker, Architects, proceeded to obtain planning permission for the works and to prepare tender documentation which was then issued to several suitable building contractors for pricing.

With the appointment of Dave Stanley (who formerly assisted St Paul's in Kisiizi Hospital) as our Project Manager, work started in July 2012. We agreed the scope of the building contract and made some assessments on contingencies required to cover unforeseeable works. It was estimated that the project would take some six months and cost €1,280,000. When safe access was put in place at the commencement of the contract, an inspection of the listed risk items revealed the need for several significant additional tasks, including woodworm treatment of the attic timbers and the removal of three further stained glass windows. These items necessitated four Section 5 Planning Applications being submitted to the Local Authority, as the church is a Protected Structure.

Despite the time needed for these additional planning applications and extensive additional work, the project was completed in February 2013, with a final account of just over €1.5m.

The schedule of works below will give an idea of the extent of the works and enable us all to appreciate the width of the scope, as much of the works carried out are not readily visible.

Roof: Extensive repairs to slates and ridge tiles, including the replacement of the entire roof slates over the side transept; end gable steel straps had to be replaced. The lower 11 rows of slates were removed from both sides of the main roof to allow access to the lower rafter timbers for woodworm treatment and reinforcement, following which many of these broken natural slates had to be replaced; repaired cracks to the chimneys and added cowls; repaired extensive flashings in valleys and at parapet level; replaced and repaired guttering, hoppers and downpipes; removed, repaired and replaced crenulations on the east side.

Attic: Strengthened roof structure against cracking using bracing as cross ties; added splice plates to cracked rafters; cleaned out the ceiling rafters and applied woodworm treatment to the entire attic space in the main roof; insulated the main roof right down to the eaves level of the rafters; provided a new hatch access to the attic and access walkway for later inspections.

Spire: Replaced top stone and repaired/repainted the cross; removed the levelling shims and applied repair mortar in the damaged joint around the entire perimeter; undertook spot repairs to spire stone work, including pointing; replaced the lightning conductor.

External Stoneworks: Extensive repairs to the window traceries, including replacement and numerous patch repairs of the mullions, including older repairs to the stone around the windows; the Rose window needed special extra attention; repaired cracks in pinnacles, with many instances of pointing repairs; treated all mould, moss and algae growth; fixed three known leaks into the church.

Internal Stone Works: Removed old coating and conducted extensive repairs to stone traceries surrounding the glazing; removed efflorescence; sanded down all internal window surrounds; major repair to second door surrounds in the main foyer due to rusting hinges and cracks in stonework; plastered over areas in side chapel and re-fixed several of the memorial plaques.

Glazing: Removed eight full stained-glass windows for repair in the studio; repaired 13 other stained and plain glass windows in situ; repaired glazing bars and repaired window openings; provided fully ventilated external secondary glazing to all windows – this was a preferred choice to the proposed grills and was cost neutral.

Electrical works: Rewired all electrical cables and installed a new main circuit board; Installed new lighting throughout, including new pendant lights centred on the two aisles – lights are movement sensitive in ancillary rooms; installed new intruder alarms on all external doors and PIRs in selected locations; installed a new sound system, including speakers and a main control panel; Installed security lights at each external door and emergency lights throughout.

Heating works: Replaced all existing pipework and radiators with energy efficient three leaf radiators; installed extra boiler in Parish Centre dedicated to the church heating, with new 24 hour/7 day control, including thermostatic control in the church; provided independent hot water heaters for all hand basins, including new basins in the vestry and rear of church toilets; provided new ventilation to toilet at rear of church.

Bells: Replaced and repaired bolts, bushings, clappers and straps due to rust; applied anti-rust and intumescent paint to steel support beams; Treated end of timber supports.

Entrances: Provided two automatic universal access doors at ramp entrance.

Balcony: Strengthened floor joists and provided safety rails at edges.

Fire Compliance: Removed all combustible cupboards and stored materials in critical areas; removed former ladies robing room; installed new fire extinguishers and new fire notices and signage; Installed new smoke detection and fire alarm system, together with emergency lighting system in case of fire; provided new fire doors at entrances and to robing room; provided fire proof cupboard in northern entrance and for sound system in robing room; fire-proofed balcony and upper robing room stairs; installed fire control panel in Vestry; reversed hinges on some firedoors.

Vestry: Installed new shelves and cupboards and new wash hand basin and fittings.

Main Robing Room: Added new tea station to replace that in now demolished ladies robing room; outside of contract, Roy Watchorn kindly installed comprehensive new cupboards for storage of electric piano, choir music, robes and archive material over two floors; provided new storage space for other church material.

Decoration: Painted all surfaces except exposed stone and the organ, including ceilings, timber arches, pews, cupboards, sanctuary timber panels, new plastered areas; painted external louvres in tower and dormer vents and all ironware, including downpipes and main gates; laid new carpets only in essential areas – back and front of church, side chapel, Vestry, stairs to balcony, main corridor on balcony; laid new floor covering in toilets.

== Music ==
There has probably been a choir at St Paul's since it was consecrated in 1868. The current choir under the Director of Music, are an SATB choir with around 16 members. They sing Choral Eucharist twice a month, and are regularly invited to sing in neighbouring parishes and diocesan cathedrals. In 2015, 2016 and 2017 the choir undertook a tour to the Diocese of Derry and Raphoe and sing every summer in St Patrick's Cathedral, Dublin. There is an esteemed history of Directors of Music, with the current one being Caroline Barnes.

== Organ ==
This organ was originally a Forster & Andrews built onto the back wall of the church. However, when the present sanctuary was added, the instrument was moved into a newly built chamber. At that stage was almost identical in specification to the organ of St Philip & St James' Church, Booterstown. However, in 1993 Derek Verso carried out a major rebuild. The organ was taken out of the chamber and placed in the south transept of the church. New casework was carefully constructed, modeled on the original front paneling. Old dummy pipes (stored away after the moving of the old organ to the chamber) were added to make a new side-facade. A great number of new stops were added (mostly to the Pedal, which is now very developed) and a new console was built retaining the original keyboards. It features a combination system, rare for a parish organ and very useful for repertoire and liturgy. The finished instrument is a powerful, free-standing organ, unique and one of the finest two-manuals in Dublin, at least. In 2017/18 the organ went under major refurbishment carried out by the Wells Kennedy Partnership. It is now being maintained and enhanced by Trevor Crowe.
