= R828 road (Ireland) =

Road in Ireland

R828 road
- Bóthar R828
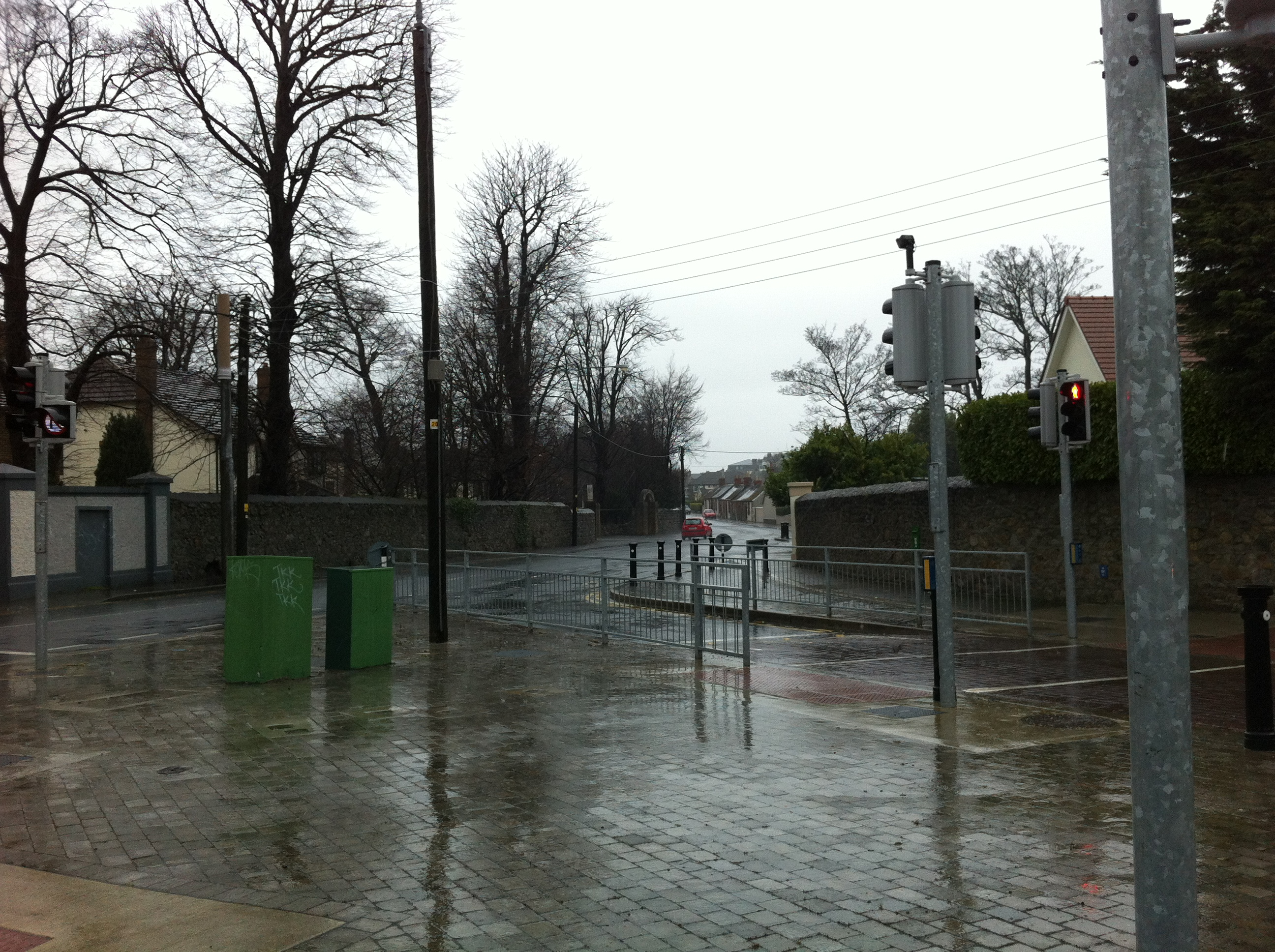
- Stradbrook Road, at the junction of the R828 and R827

Route information
- Length: 3.5 km (2.2 mi)

Location
- Country: Ireland
- Primary destinations: Dún Laoghaire–Rathdown; R827 (Deansgrange Road); Stradbrook Road; Abbey Road; Rochestown Avenue; R118 (Church Road, Killiney)

Highway system
- Roads in Ireland; Motorways; Primary; Secondary; Regional

The R828 road is a regional road in Dún Laoghaire–Rathdown, Ireland.

The official definition of the R828 from the Roads Act 1993 (Classification of Regional Roads) Order 2012 states:

R828: Stradbrook Road - Killiney, County Dublin

Between its junction with R827 at Deansgrange Road and its junction with R118 at Church Road Killiney via Stradbrook Road, Abbey Road and Rochestown Avenue all in the county of Dún Laoghaire–Rathdown.

The road is 3.5 kilometres (2.2 mi) long.

== See also ==
- Roads in Ireland
- Regional road
