= IÉ 90000 Class =

Irish electric multiple unit train class

- DART 90000 class unit at Drogheda
- Stock type: Electric multiple unit
- In service: 2027 (projected)
- Manufacturer: Alstom
- Assembly: Katowice, Poland
- Family name: X'Trapolis
- Constructed: 2024-present
- Entered service: 2027 (projected)
- Number built: 57
- Capacity: 504 passengers
- Operator: Iarnród Éireann
- Lines served: DART+ West; DART+ South West; DART+ Coastal North

Specifications
- Train length: 82 m (269 ft 0 in)
- Maximum speed: 145 km/h (90 mph)
- Electric systems: 1,500 V DC (nominal) from overhead catenary
- Current collection: Pantograph
- Track gauge: 1,600 mm (5 ft 3 in)

The Iarnród Éireann 90000 Class is a type of electric multiple unit (EMU) which will be deployed on the DART network in Dublin, Ireland. In December 2021 Iarnród Éireann chose Alstom as supplier of up to 750 carriages, in five- or ten-carriage trains, and made an initial order of 19 five-carriage trains, 13 of which will be battery electric multiple units (BEMUs). A second order was placed in December 2022 for 18 five-car BEMUs. A third order of 20 units was made in December 2025.

== Background ==
Iarnród Éireann were in talks with the NTA by 2017 about acquiring a new fleet of bi-mode DART trains to replace the current fleet. Plans to order new DART trains had previously been announced in 2008, but had been cancelled as a result of the Great Recession. A tender for the 600 new DART carriages was published in March 2019, attracting bids from Bombardier Transportation (Alstom after Bombardier's buyout), Siemens Mobility and Stadler Rail.

The class is part of the DART+ project, which will expand DART services to lines which are currently served by diesel multiple units (DMUs) such as the 29000 class and 22000 class. The BEMUs will be used for services on the non-electrified lines to Maynooth, Hazelhatch and Drogheda. The class is being constructed by Alstom at their facility in Katowice, Poland. The first unit arrived in Ireland in late 2024 and the first trains were expected to enter service in 2026.

The first unit, 90001, started testing between Inchicore and Hazelhatch in February 2025.

In October 2025, it was revealed that the class would not enter service until "the second quarter of 2027" due to battery issues.

== Design ==
The five-car articulated trains are 82 metres (269 ft 0 in) long, the same as the current four-car 8500 Class trains, and have a capacity of 551 passengers, including 204 seats. The maximum speed is 145 kilometres per hour (90 mph). To improve accessibility the trains will have lower floors for level access from platforms and a sliding ramp at each door.

The BEMUs will be fitted with lithium-ion batteries with a capacity of 840 kWh and an expected range of 80 kilometres (50 mi) even at the end of the operational life of the batteries. The trains will not charge from the existing 1500 V DC overhead lines, but will need special charging points, the first of which will be at Drogheda. A charging station is also proposed at Wicklow railway station from 2029 onwards.

The 5-car BEMU sets will be classified as the 90000 Class, while the purely EMU sets will be classed as the 80000 Class.
