= IÉ 8500, 8510 and 8520 Classes =

2000s related Irish electric multiple units

Iarnród Éireann 8500, 8510 and 8520 Classes
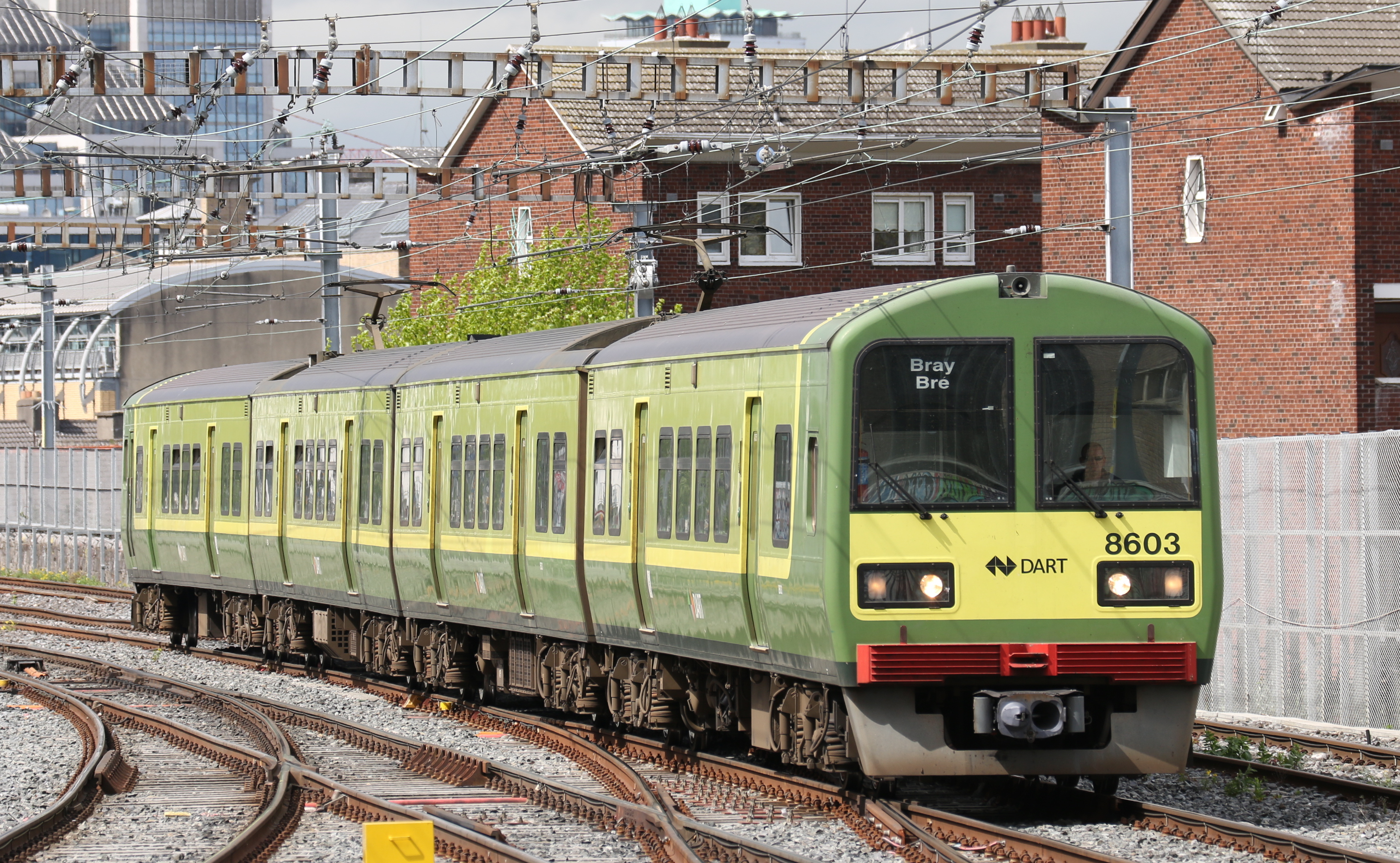
- 8603 approaches Grand Canal Dock Station

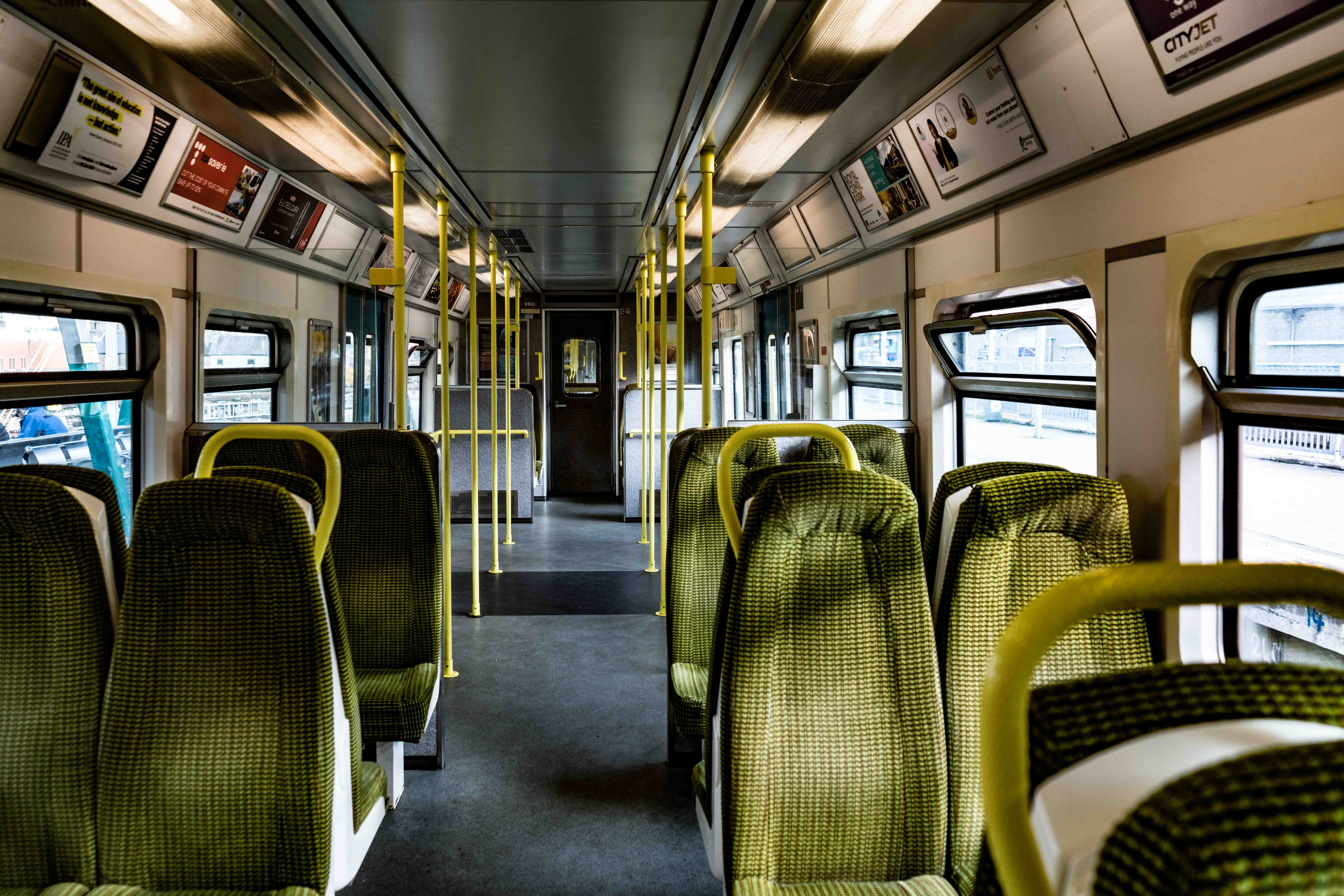
- Refurbished interior
- Stock type: electric multiple unit
- In service: 2001–present
- Manufacturer: Tokyu Car Corporation
- Family name: Commuter
- Constructed: 2000–2004
- Entered service: 6 July 2001 (8500 class); 2 April 2002 (8510 class); 17 September 2004 (8520 class)
- Number built: 4 sets (8500 class); 3 sets (8510 class); 10 sets (8520 class)
- Formation: 4-car sets: DT–DM–DM–DT
- Fleet numbers: 8501–8508, 8511–8516, 8521–8540 (DM); 8601–8608, 8611–8616, 8621–8640 (DT)
- Capacity: 160 seated, 726 standing
- Operator: DART

Specifications
- Car body construction: Austenitic stainless steel
- Train length: 82.64 m (271 ft 2 in)
- Car length: 20.76 m (68 ft 1 in) (DM); 20.56 m (67 ft 5 in) (DT)
- Width: 2.9 m (9 ft 6 in)
- Height: 3,945 mm (12 ft 11.3 in)
- Floor height: 1,067 mm (3 ft 6.0 in)
- Wheel diameter: 840 mm (33 in) (new)
- Wheelbase: 2.2 m (7 ft 3 in)
- Maximum speed: 110 km/h (68 mph) (design); 100 km/h (62 mph) (service)
- Weight: 148.07 t (145.73 long tons; 163.22 short tons)
- Traction system: Toshiba IGBT–VVVF; 8500 Class: SVF045-A0; 8510 Class: SVF045-B0; 8520 Class: SVF045-C0
- Traction motors: 8 × Toshiba SEA-384 140 kW (190 hp) asynchronous 3-phase AC
- Power output: 1,120 kW (1,500 hp)
- Gear ratio: 7.345 : 1 (2-stage reduction)
- Electric systems: 1,500 V DC (nominal) from overhead catenary
- Current collection: Type MU20A single-arm pantograph
- UIC classification: 2′2′+Bo′Bo′+Bo′Bo′+2′2′
- Wheels driven: 16 out of 32
- Bogies: Type TS-1024B
- Coupling system: Scharfenberg/Dellner
- Track gauge: 1,600 mm (5 ft 3 in)

The Iarnród Éireann 8500, 8510 and 8520 Classes are three related types of EMU used on the DART network in Dublin, Ireland. The total fleet numbers a total of 17 four-car trains, all of which were constructed by the Tokyu Car Corporation.

== 8500 Class ==
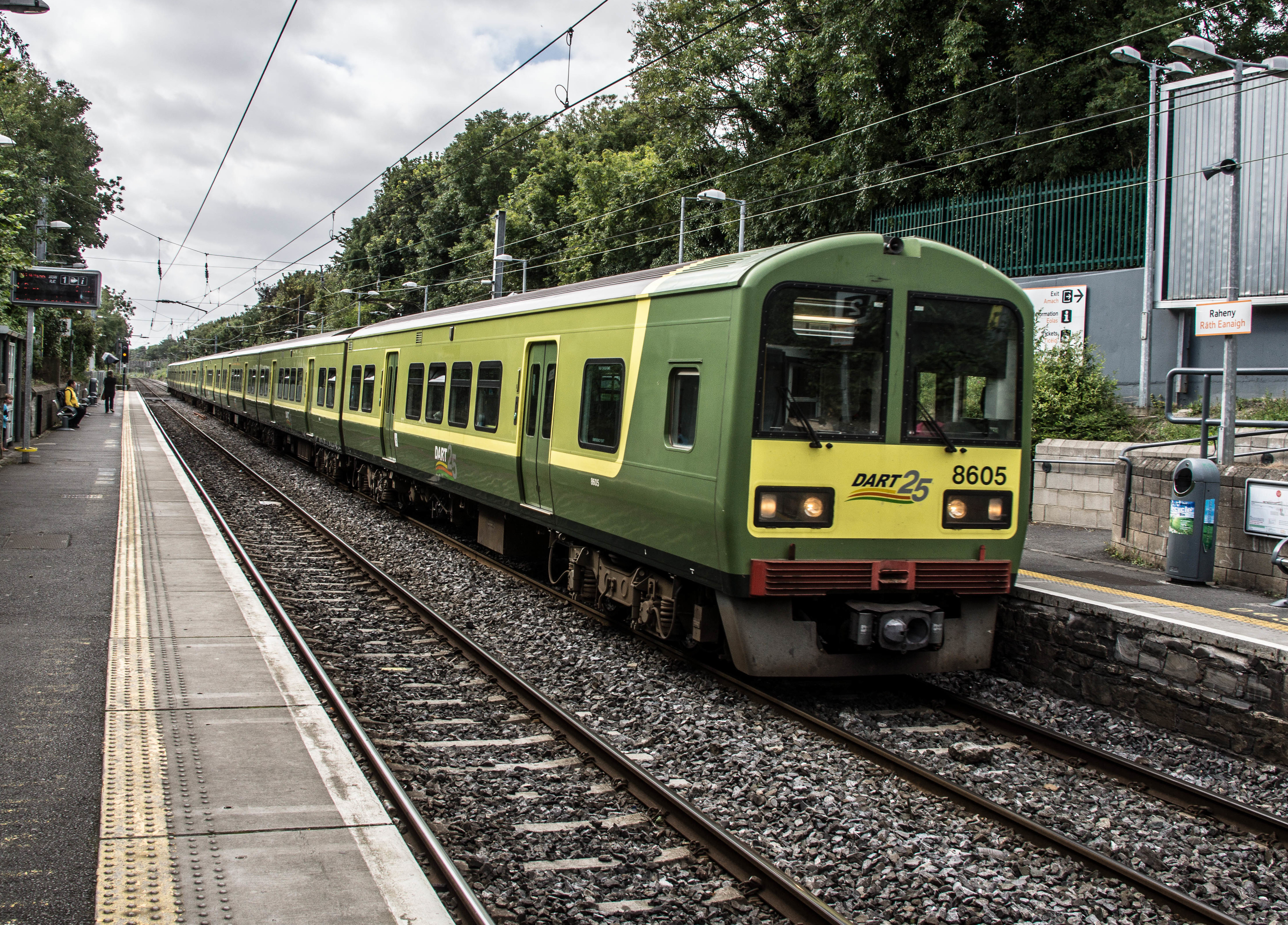
8605 at Raheny railway station

The 8500 Class were delivered in 2000 and were the first four car units to be used on the DART network. They are numbered in the sequence 860X+850X+850Y+860Y. 850X/850Y units are power cars while 860X/860Y units are unpowered driving trailers. Their interior destination displays and public announcement system has been long turned off. Like all DART units, the 8500 Class are maintained at Fairview depot, and are also stabled at Bray Station.

== 8510 Class ==
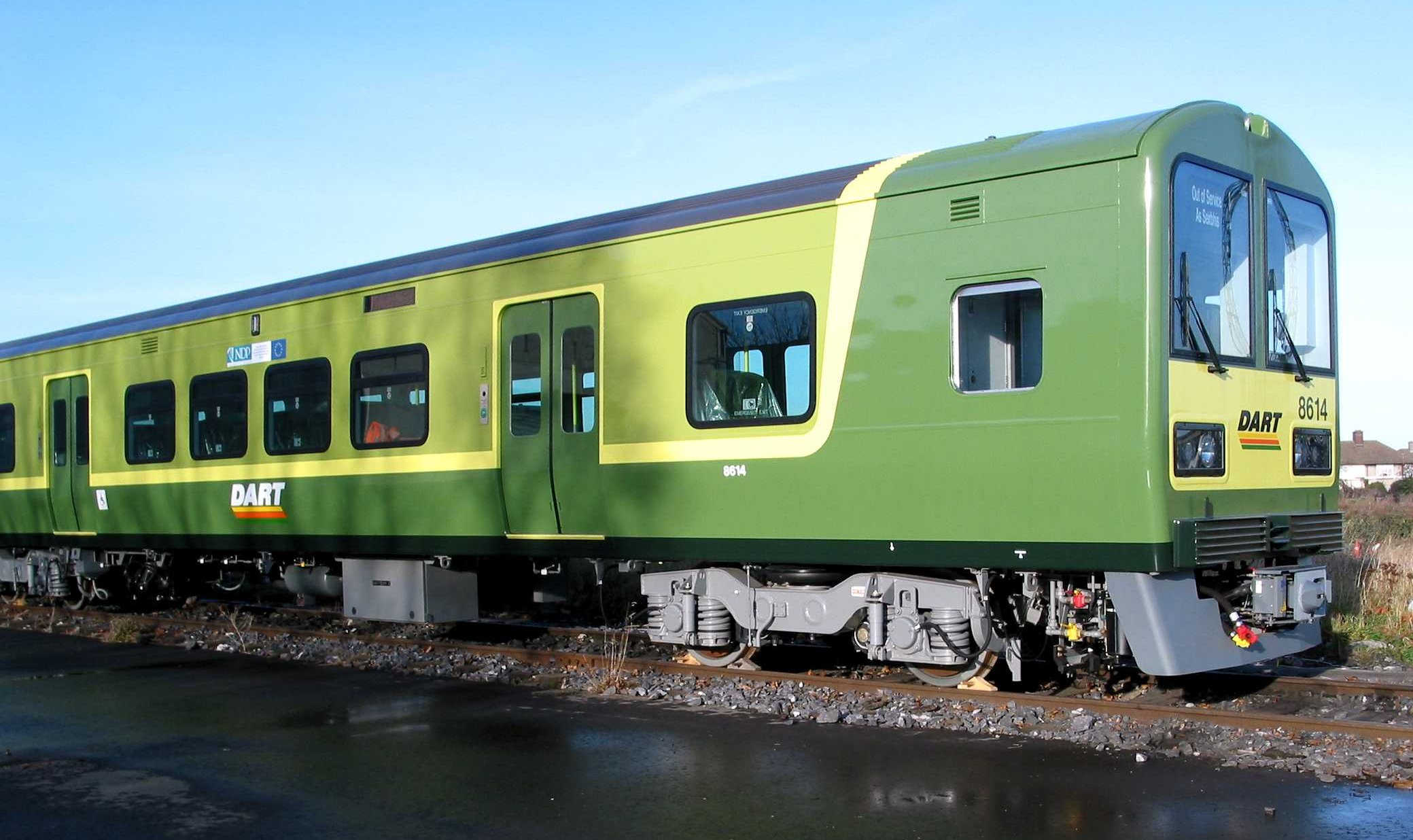
8614 shortly after delivery

The 8510 Class were delivered in 2001 as three 4-car trains supplementing the original 8500 Class. Vehicles are numbered in the sequence 861X+851X+851Y+861Y. 851X/851Y units are power cars while 861X/861Y units are unpowered driving trailers. The most visible difference between the 8510 Class and the 8500 Class is the now obsolete passenger information system which is installed in the 8510s. Other differences include the presence of destination/next station displays above the windows of 8510s and the use of LED tail lights and headlights on 8510s in contrast with ordinary ones on the 8500s. They are capable of operating in multiple with the 8500 and 8520 Classes. The units are maintained at Fairview depot.

== 8520 Class ==
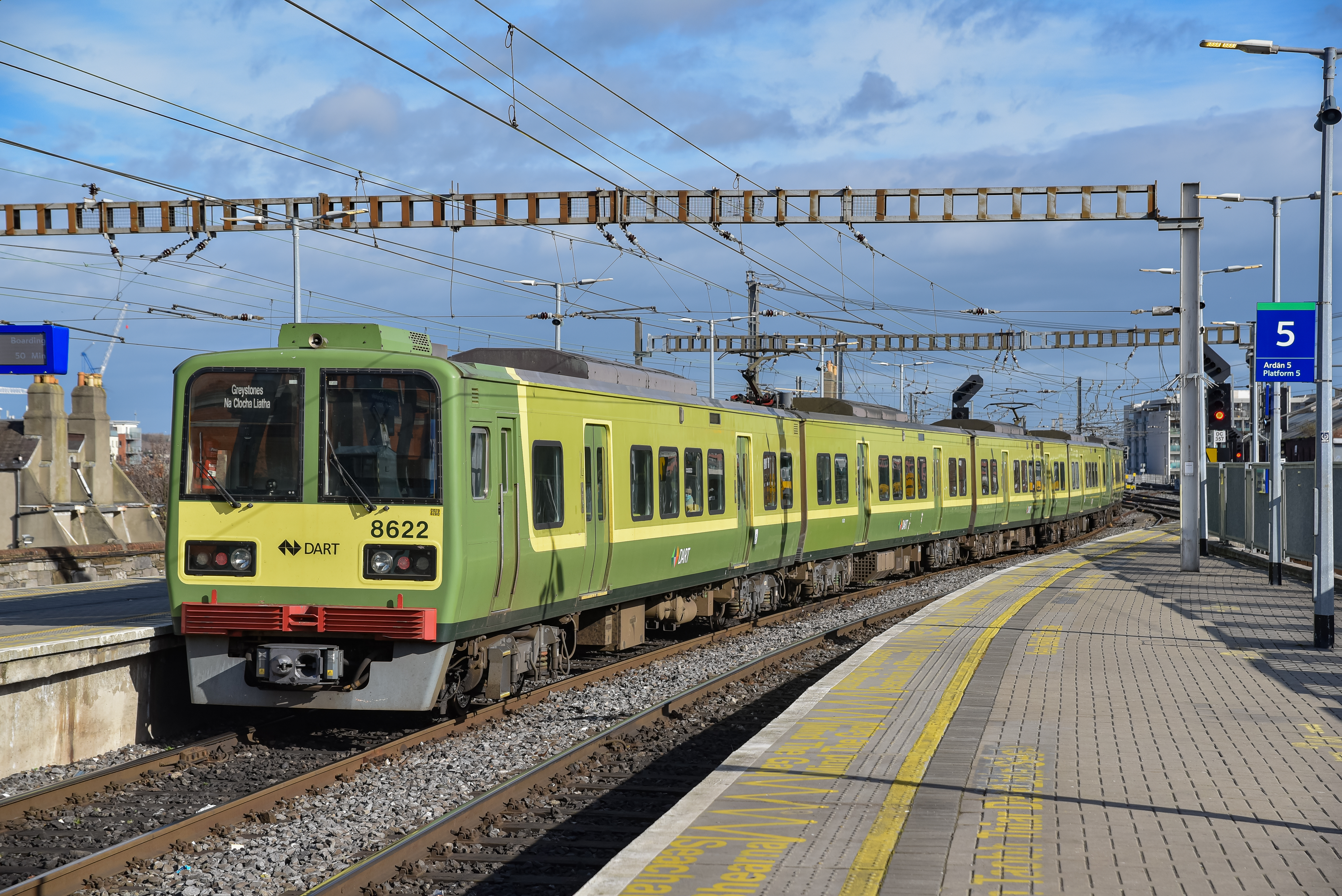
8622 at Dublin Connolly

The 8520 Class was introduced in 2004; there are ten of these sets. The units can be seen working in multiple with an 8500 or 8510 though usually with another 8520 unit. Vehicles are numbered in the sequence 86XX+85XX+85YY+86YY. 85XX/85YY units are power cars while 862X/862Y units are unpowered driving trailers. They were the first units to carry the revised DART logo and also the first to be fully air conditioned. They can be distinguished from the previous 8500s and 8510s by the profile of the bodyshell, which is more rectangular, by the lack of opening windows in the passenger seating area and that the 8520s have flatter seats than the 8500s and 8510s. During 2022, the entire fleet was refurbished. This refurbishment included new exterior LED destination displays on the front and side, new interior displays showing information such as the destination, next stop and time & a new PA system.

== Fleet details ==
Class	Operator	Number of Trains built	Year built	Cars per Set	Unit nos.
8500 Class	DART	4	2000-2001	4	8601/8602 – 8607/8608
8510 Class	DART	3	2001-2002	4	8611/8612 – 8615/8616
8520 Class	DART	10	2003–2004	4	8621/8622 – 8639/8640

== Gallery ==
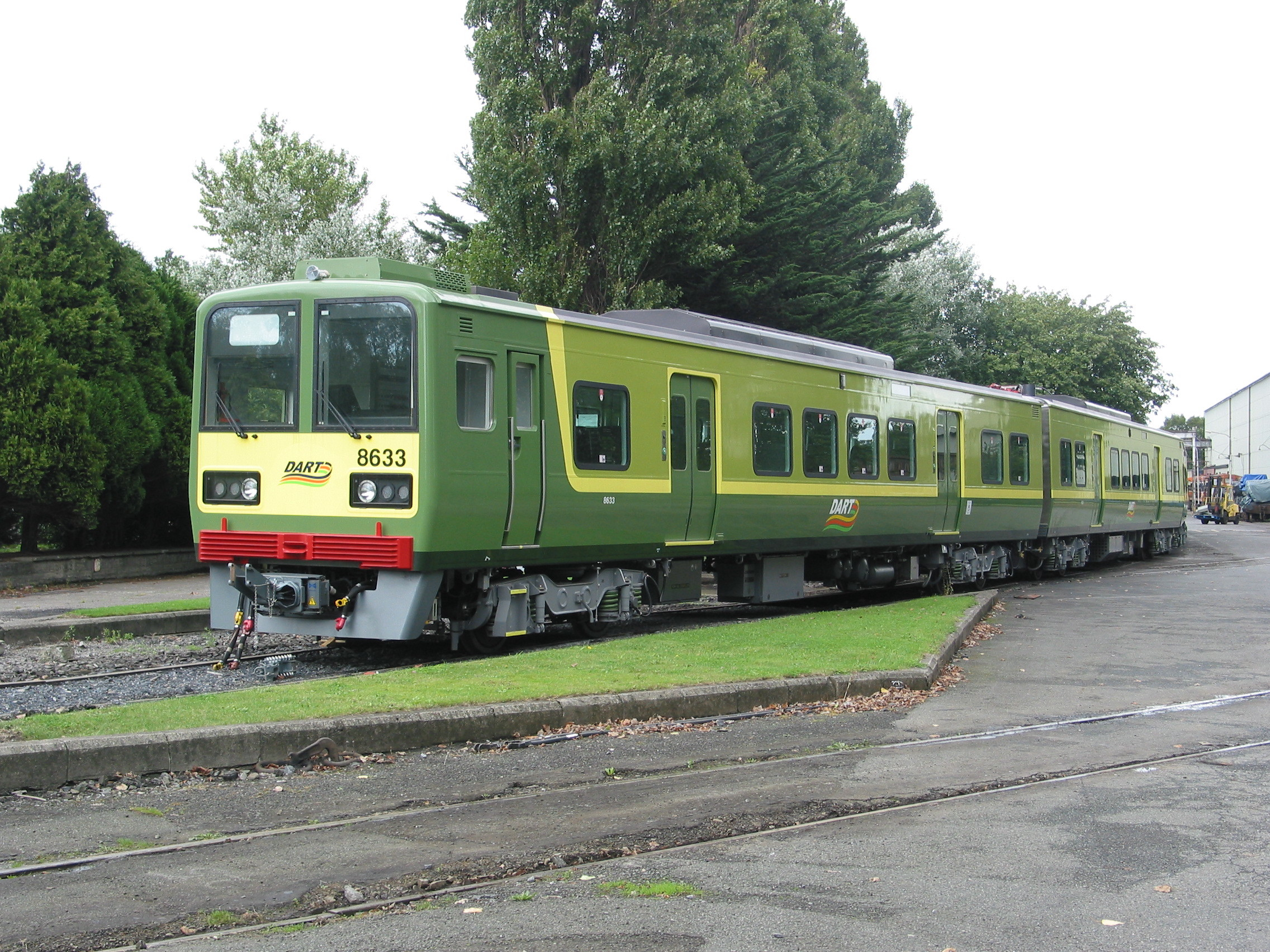
Unit 8633 at Inchicore Works shortly after delivery in 2004.

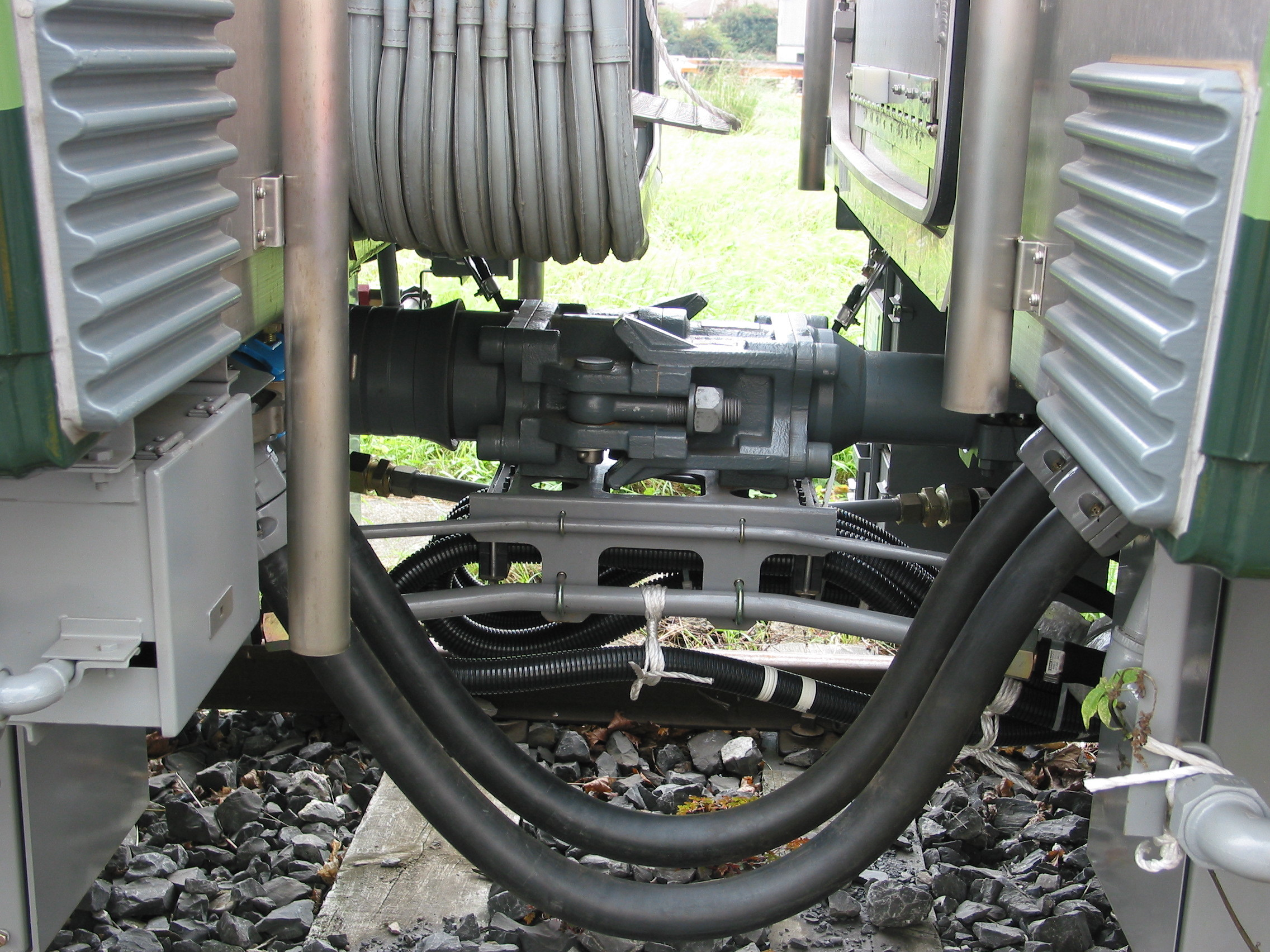
Connection between vehicles of unit 8633.

== See also ==
- Multiple Units of Ireland
- Dublin Area Rapid Transit
- IE 8200 Class
