= Dublin Area Rapid Transit =

Commuter rail network in Dublin, Ireland

Dublin Area Rapid Transit (DART)

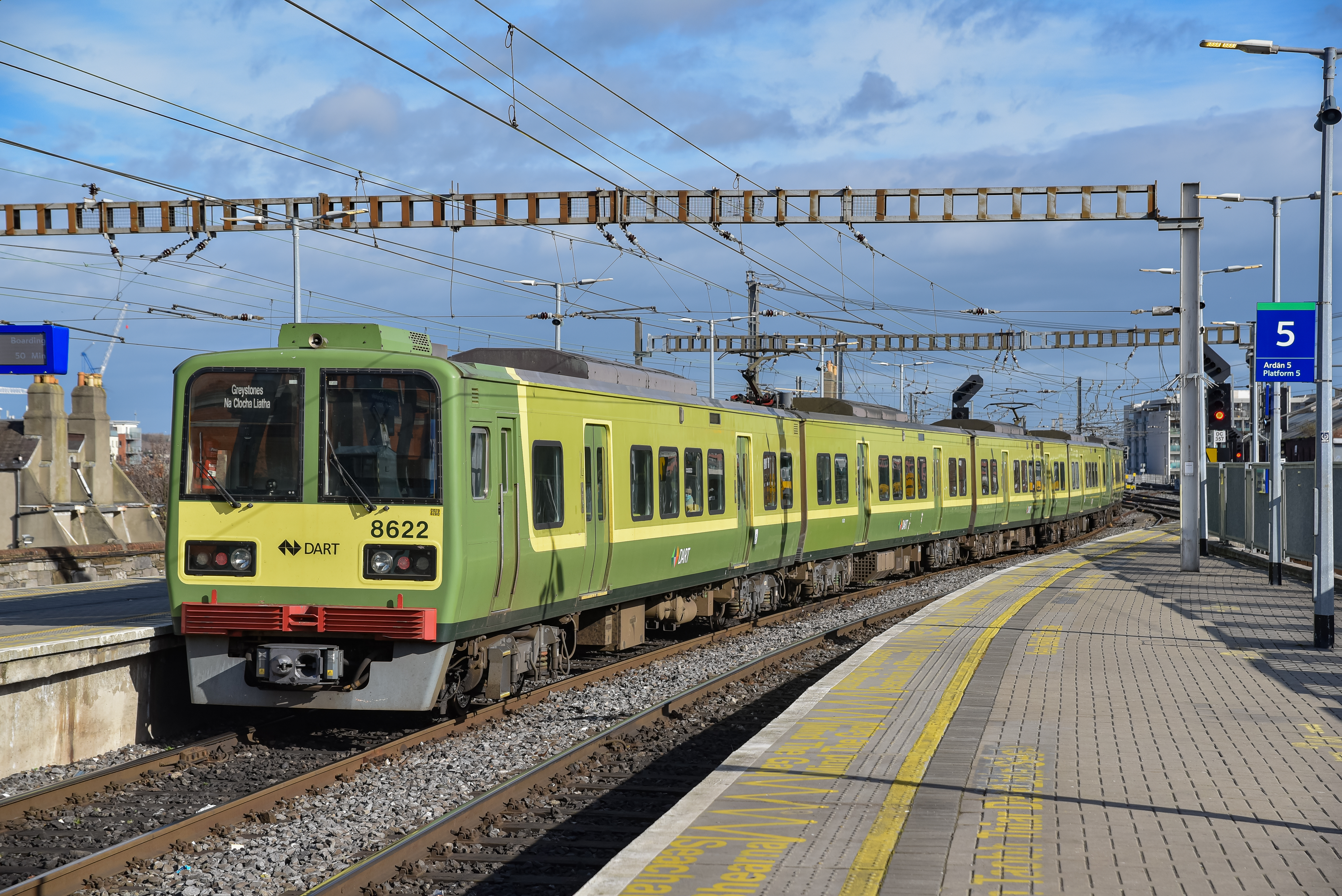
- An 8520 Class DART train (8622) at Connolly station

Overview
- Other name: DART
- Native name: Mearlíne Átha Cliath
- Status: Active
- Owner: Iarnród Éireann
- Locale: Dublin, Ireland
- Termini: Malahide/Howth; Greystones
- Stations: 32
- Website: http://www.irishrail.ie/

Service
- Type: Commuter rail
- Services: 2
- Operator: Iarnród Éireann
- Depot: Fairview DART depot
- Rolling stock: 8100 Class; 8500, 8510 and 8520 Classes
- Ridership: 23 million (2025)

History
- Opened: 23 July 1984
- Last extension: 9 October 2000
- Last station opening: 10 August 2025

Technical
- Line length: 53 km (33 mi)
- Num of tracks: 1–2
- Track gauge: 1,600 mm (5 ft 3 in)
- Electrification: 1,500 V DC overhead catenary
- Operating speed: 100 km/h (62 mph)

Dublin Area Rapid Transit (DART) is an electrified commuter rail railway network serving the coastline and city of Dublin, Ireland. The service makes up the core of Dublin's suburban railway network, stretching from Greystones, County Wicklow, in the south to Howth and Malahide in north County Dublin. The DART serves 32 stations and consists of 53 route kilometres of electrified railway (46 km (29 mi) double track, 7 km (4.3 mi) single), and carries to up 23 million passengers per year. In a similar manner to the Berlin S-Bahn, the DART blends elements of a commuter rail service and a rapid transit system.

The DART system was established by Córas Iompair Éireann in 1984 to replace an ageing fleet of diesel-powered locomotives. It was, and still is, the only electric mainline railway in Ireland, and one of two currently operating electric railways, the other being the Luas tram which opened in 2004. Since 1987, the service is operated by Iarnród Éireann, Ireland's national rail operator. Contemporary rolling stock on the DART network is powered by 1,500 V DC overhead lines and uses the 1,600 mm (5 ft 3 in) Irish gauge.

The network is being significantly expanded in the 2020s as part of the DART+ project, with future services to run to Drogheda, County Louth, Celbridge and Maynooth in County Kildare and Dunboyne, County Meath.

== History ==
=== Initial development ===
The section of trackbed between Dún Laoghaire and Dublin City was originally laid out as part of the Dublin and Kingstown Railway, Ireland's first railway. This line was later connected with the Belfast mainline to the north and Wexford mainline to the south and joined the Harcourt Street line at Shanganagh Junction. The scenic views from the railway over Dublin Bay at this point have been compared to those on the Gulf of Naples and have resulted in trips to Killiney Hill and Greystones along the line becoming tourist attractions.

Prior to electrification in 1984, the line was operated using 1950s-era CIÉ 2600 Class rail cars which had been converted in the early 1970s to push-pull operation. These diesel-powered trains were powered by a CIE 201 Class locomotive, with a driving trailer carriage on the other end. This service was notoriously uncomfortable, unreliable, and overcrowded. By the late 1970s, the need for an urgent upgrade to the system had become apparent, as the 2600 Class railcars were in poor condition. Replacement parts had become difficult to obtain due to the age of the rolling stock and its conversion to push-pull operation, which had been intended as a temporary measure until a more permanent solution could be established, had come to the end of its serviceable life.

After studies in the early 1970s, the Dublin Rapid Rail Transit Study, published in 1975, recommended the construction of a rapid transit system with 2 lines: the first one between Howth and 'Ronanstown Centre', a station to be located roughly where Clondalkin/Fonthill is today, and navigating the city centre via a cross-city tunnel; and the second line between Bray and 'Blanchardstown Centre'. The two lines would intersect at an interchange known as 'Dublin Central'. Additionally, branches were to be constructed to serve the suburbs of Ballymun and Tallaght.

The first phase of the project (Howth–Bray) would receive CIÉ approval in 1977, and government approval on 31 May 1979 amidst the 1979 European elections. Linke-Hofmann-Busch would win the contract and supply 40 EMUs, beginning trials in March 1983. Public services began on 23 July 1984 and be inaugurated by Taoiseach Garret FitzGerald on 22 October of that year. The rest of the study would not be implemented reportedly due to a lack of funds.

In conjunction with electrification, three disused stations at Sandymount, Booterstown and Salthill and Monkstown were reopened for the DART in 1984. Sandymount and Booterstown were each built at the sites of a previous station while Salthill and Monkstown was built near the site of the original Kingstown railway terminus, between Seapoint and Dún Laoghaire. As electrification work was undertaken from 1981 to 1982, a spur which had served the ferry port at Dún Laoghaire was disconnected from the mainline as the installation of overhead power lines to service the harbour would have necessitated the lowering of the track which travelled through a portal south of Dún Laoghaire station.

Early DART services ran from the north-eastern suburb of Howth, through Connolly, Tara Street, and Pearse stations in the city centre and on to Bray, which lies on the border between Dublin and Wicklow. This route remained unchanged for almost sixteen years until the line between Bray and Greystones was electrified. Further electrification of the line took place between Howth Junction & Donaghmede and Malahide, the northernmost DART station, on the Belfast mainline. The service to Portmarnock and Malahide began in October 2000.

In March 2017, the government announced plans for a proposed new DART station, Woodbrook, to be built between Shankill and Bray on the southern section of the DART line. In 2020, Iarnród Éireann submitted a planning application for the station, and planning permission was granted in July 2021. Work on the station commenced by late 2023. The station opened in August 2025, as the 32nd station on the line.

== Operation ==
The DART service is operated by a mixed fleet of electric multiple unit trains. As of 2026, the trains run every ten minutes on weekdays with a reduced service on weekends. Trains north of Howth Junction are split between Howth and Malahide while the Malahide service is supplemented by Northern Commuter trains.

Trains are typically run as four-car, six-car or eight-car sets during the 07.00–09.30 and 17.00–19.00 weekday peak periods. Capacity is reduced during off-peak periods and at weekends, with up to four eight-car sets running. Four-car sets typically consist of a single 8500 Class unit while six-car sets are made up of three 8100 Class units. Eight-car sets can be made up of either two 8500 Class or four 8100 Class units. Both classes had worked in tandem prior to the refurbishment of the aging 8100 Class in 2007, after which both have been run separately.

Forty two-car 8100 Class units were purchased to run the initial network. Two of these were damaged beyond repair in a depot fire in 2001. Expanding passenger numbers and the need to refurbish the aging 8100 Class units saw the purchase of four 8500 Class train sets in 2000. These were complemented with three 8510 Class sets in 2001 and ten 8520 Class sets in 2003 and 2004. The now-withdrawn 8200 Class sets which were first run in 2000 operated until 2009 at which point they were retired from revenue service and decommissioned due to longstanding technical issues. A redevelopment of the network's stations was undertaken between 2003 and 2005 to lengthen platforms to accommodate eight-car sets, upgrade the power grid, and improve accessibility for disabled passengers.

=== Service ===
All trains in the Dublin suburban area, including DART services, are monitored and regulated by a Central Traffic Control (CTC) facility located in Connolly Station, known as Suburban CTC. This facility has been extensively automated and requires a staff of five; two signallers, one with responsibility for level crossings, an electrical control officer, who supervises the electrical power supply equipment and an overall supervisor. The main CTC is staffed at all times however, there are also backup local control rooms which allow services to continue in the event of serious technical problems.

A single driver is responsible for the management of each train from the cab in the leading carriage. Automatic doors are controlled by the driver and are armed upon arrival at stations. Real-time passenger information displays on station platforms offer passengers updates on the next train arrival times, service updates and outages. Automatic PA announcements are made in case of service disruptions and are tailored to each station.

The majority of stations on the network have been renovated to include automatic barriers which require passengers to submit their tickets for verification before they can set foot on the platform. A ticket is required in advance of boarding DART services and can be purchased at stations from staffed kiosks and automated machines. Passengers can also avail of the option of using a Leap Card, Ireland's integrated ticketing scheme. Leap Cards are contactless cards onto which passengers can load set ticket options or a cash balance, and Leap fares are typically cheaper than paying in cash for a journey. On the DART network, users tag on at their point of entry and tag off at their exit point. Fares are calculated based of the number of zones traveled through, with zone 1 being within Dublin City and zone 2-4 corresponding to the wider commuter area. Irish Rail, along with Dublin's other public transport operators operated its own smart card system which was phased out to coincide with the Leap Card's introduction. Revenue protection officers check passengers' tickets to ensure validity both onboard trains and on station platforms at random intervals.

== Future ==
A map of the Dublin area showing the existing DART and LUAS lines (2023), the proposed DART+ programme, and the proposed MetroLink line.

=== DART+ ===
In February 2018, the Irish government and National Transport Authority announced a 10-year plan to electrify the lines to Drogheda, Maynooth, Hazelhatch, M3 Parkway and Docklands. The proposed project, which had previously been referred to as "DART Expansion", was renamed "DART+" in 2020. The project was split into five sub-projects:

- DART+ Coastal North: Drogheda to Connolly Station.
- DART+ Coastal South: Greystones to Connolly Station.
- DART+ West: Maynooth and the M3 Parkway (merging at Clonsilla Station) to Connolly Station and Spencer Dock Station.
- DART+ South West: Hazelhatch & Celbridge to Heuston Station and a proposed station at Glasnevin.
- DART+ Fleet : The purchasing of a new fleet to serve these routes.

In 2019, a tender for up to 600 bi-mode battery-electric units was issued to provide fleet capacity for the proposed expansion, and a tender was also issued for initial design work on the additional electrification requirements.

==== Extension to Maynooth (DART+ West) ====
The initial phase of the DART+ plan, DART+ West, proposes to provide 40 km (25 mi) of electrification to Maynooth and M3 Parkway, a new terminus at Spencer Dock to replace Docklands station, a new maintenance depot at Maynooth and additional works in relation to signalling and level crossing closures. The project was at the design stage as of April 2019, and the planning stage in December 2021. Public consultation closed in October 2022.

An Bord Pleanála was initially due to issue a decision by March 2023 with Iarnród Éireann hoping to begin construction in early 2024, but later postponed the deadline to December 2023. Permission for DART+ West was granted in July 2024, though permission for the Maynooth depot was refused due to flood risks. As of July 2024, Iarnród Éireann stated that it aimed for services on the lines to "start by 2029". The company stated a revised proposal for a new depot would be submitted separately and would "not cause delays to the completion date". Revised plans for the depot, now situated west of Kilcock, were submitted in March 2026.

==== Extension to Hazelhatch and Celbridge (DART+ South West) ====
The second phase, DART+ South West, was approved by the government in March 2023. A railway order application was submitted by Iarnród Éireann the same month. The proposal included the electrification of 20 kilometres of track from Connolly to Hazelhatch and Celbridge via the Phoenix Park Tunnel, a new Heuston West station in place of platform 10 at Heuston and an expansion of track capacity along the Dublin–Cork line between Heuston and Park West and Cherry Orchard. If built as planned, the upgraded line would connect at Connolly to the existing DART lines on the east coast to allow for through services. The application was approved by An Bord Pleanála in November 2024.

==== Extension to Drogheda (DART+ Coastal North) ====
The DART+ project proposes an extension to Drogheda through the introduction of new bi-mode rolling stock. The trains would be powered by batteries on the currently unelectrified tracks between Drogheda MacBride station and the current terminus at Malahide, and use the existing overhead wires on the remainder of the route. Iarnród Éireann stated, in 2024, that the trains would enter service on the route in early 2026. Charging facilities are currently under construction at Drogheda MacBride station.

Further infrastructure works to increase capacity on the route are planned as part of the DART+ Coastal North project, which is currently in its planning stage. It proposes the extension of overhead wires on the Belfast–Dublin line by 37 kilometres to Drogheda, a new platform at MacBride station, several modifications to bridges and track configurations as well as upgrades to signalling and power infrastructure. DART+ Coastal North was approved by the government in May 2024 and the railway order application was submitted by Iarnród Éireann in July 2024; it was approved in August 2025.

=== Airport link ===
In 2011, plans were submitted by Irish Rail for a 7 kilometres (4.3 mi) rail line from Clongriffin to Dublin Airport, which it stated at the time could be completed at a "relatively moderate" cost of €200 million. The National Transport Authority's 2016-2035 Dublin Transport Strategy omitted the plans, stating in 2017 it had no intention to revive them. In response to MetroLink delays, Irish Rail said that the link could be completed by 2030, and would come in line with the All-Island Strategic Rail Review.

=== Proposed stations ===
A station was proposed near the site of the former Glasnevin station as part of the MetroLink project. If built as planned, it would see platforms for mainline trains constructed along the overground Western and Southern Commuter lines, which could become part of the DART network if the DART+ West and South West projects are completed as proposed.

A new station named Kylemore was proposed in September 2025, for the Dart+ South West line between Heuston and Park West and Cherry Orchard stations with a public consultation running until October 2025 and planning to be submitted in early 2026.

=== Former/suspended proposals ===
Several proposals have been made to expand the DART network beyond the coastal mainline and provide service to the north and west of the city. These expansion plans included a proposed tunnel linking the Docklands Station at Spencer Dock in the city's quays and Heuston Station. This proposed DART Underground project, first posited in 1972, included plans for services from Celbridge/Hazelhatch to the Docklands via St. Stephen's Green. The DART Underground project was put on hold in September 2015. While included in the Greater Dublin Transport Strategy 2016-2035 (published in 2016), the DART Underground proposal was not included in the Greater Dublin Area Strategy 2022-2042 (published in 2021).

Plans were unveiled under Transport 21 to expand the DART to consist of two lines. DART Line 1 would go from Maynooth to Greystones, with a branch to M3 Parkway. DART Line 2 would utilise the Interconnector to make a line between Balbriggan and Hazelhatch and retain the Howth branch line. The project was due to be completed in 2009. In April 2009, the government announced plans to extend the planned terminus for DART Line 1 from Balbriggan to Drogheda.

== Rolling stock ==
=== Current fleet ===
Class	Image	Top speed		Number	Year Built	Notes
Class	Image	km/h	mph	Number	Year Built	Notes
8100 Class		100	60	38 (formerly 40)	1983–1984	8110 and 8136 scrapped, due to the fire at Fairview Dart Depot (2001)
8500 Class		110	70	4	2000	
8510 Class		110	70	3	2001	
8520 Class		110	70	10	2003–2004	

=== Former fleet ===
Class	Image	Top speed		Number	Year Built	In service	Notes
Class	Image	km/h	mph	Number	Year Built	In service	Notes
8200 Class		100	62	5	1999–2000	2000–2009	All but 8405 and the front half of 8401 scrapped in 2023 - 2025

=== Future fleet changes ===
==== Dart+ Fleet ====
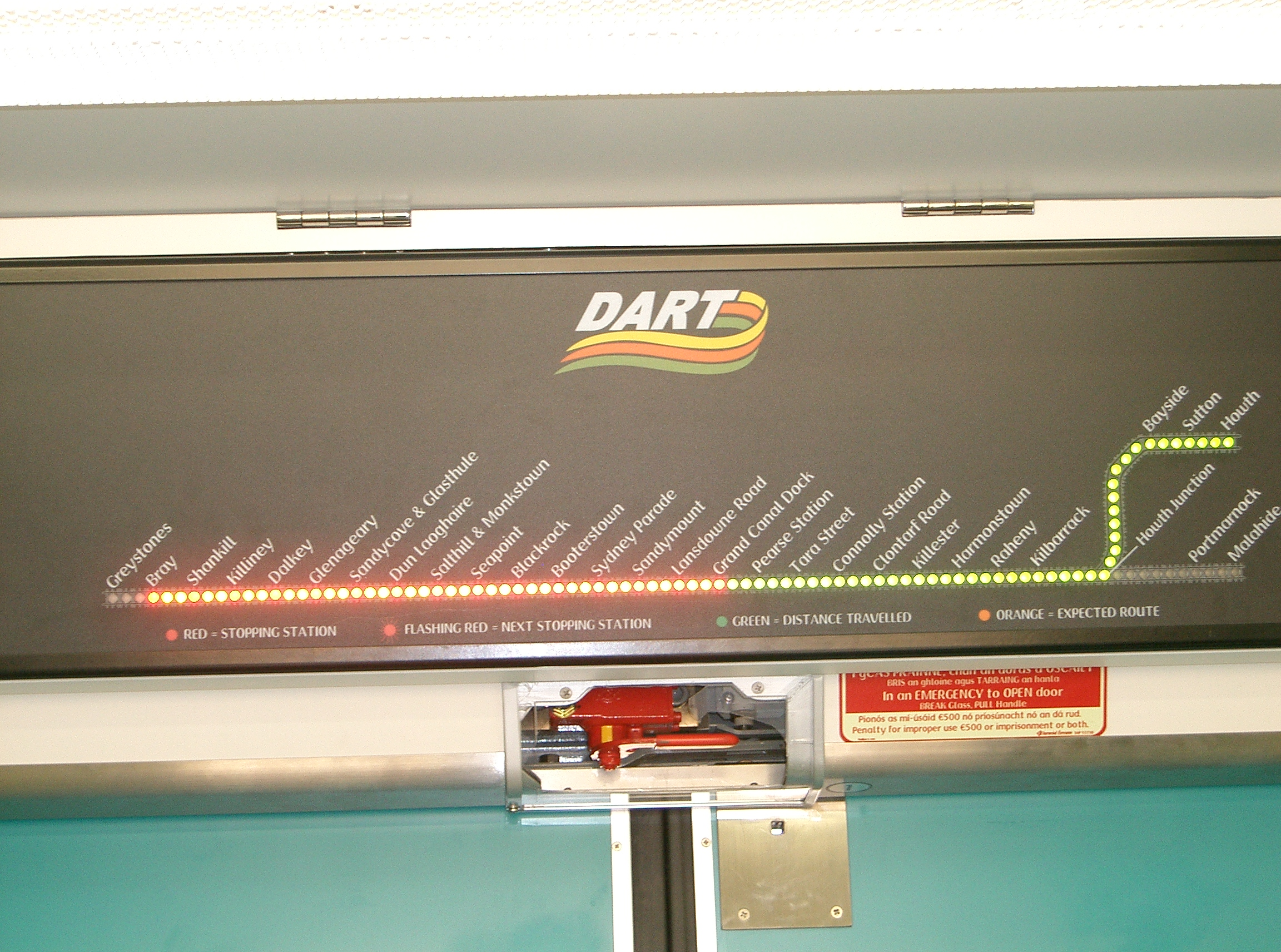
Some 8510 and 8520 class DART trains feature LED route displays, upon which green indicates the route already travelled, orange the remaining route, and flashing red indicates the next stopping station. These displays do not include Clongriffin station and have been out of use since 2010.

In 2017, IÉ announced plans to procure a new fleet of trains with the intention of extending DART services from 2023 onwards. An initial purchase of 100 vehicles was proposed to allow replacement of the existing fleet; this proposed purchase would include bi-mode units to allow services to run beyond the existing electrified network.

In December 2021, IÉ announced that Alstom had been selected as the provider of up to 750 new vehicles, with 325 planned as part of the DART+ plan. The 90000 Class are part of Alstom's X'Trapolis family. An initial order of 95 vehicles was made, formed into 19 5-car units. A total of 13 of these are due to be fitted both with pantographs to operate using the 1,500 V DC OHLE on the main DART network, and batteries to allow operation on non-electrified routes. The battery operation is planned to allow the extension of DART services as far as Drogheda. The remaining units in the initial batch are expected to also be 5-car, fitted with pantograph only.

In 2023, Alstom revealed prototypes of the new DART trains. The prototype plans include 4 bike spaces per car, dedicated wheelchair areas, and automatic ramps for passenger accessibility. In April 2023, TD Fergus O'Dowd suggested that the first set of trains was due to be delivered by 2025, enabling expansion of DART services to Drogheda along the DART+ Coastal North route. The first train was delivered in November 2024.

== Competitors ==
Iarnród Éireann, the operator of DART services, operates a rail monopoly. They also operate faster Commuter and InterCity services, which also serve Greystones, Bray, Dún Laoghaire, Blackrock, Sydney Parade, Lansdowne Road, Grand Canal Dock, Dublin Pearse, Tara Street, Dublin Connolly, Howth Junction & Donaghmede, Clongriffin, Portmarnock and Malahide. The only other company to operate on lines in the Republic of Ireland is Northern Ireland Railways, which jointly operates the cross-border Enterprise service between Dublin and Belfast.

A number of other public transport modes are available in Dublin. The CIÉ-owned Dublin Bus and the private Go-Ahead Ireland (owned by Go-Ahead Group) operate throughout the city and have many routes that run parallel to DART for stretches. However, they do not have any scheduled routes that traverse the entire length of the DART line. As in the rest of Ireland, integration of bus and rail services is limited, though there are some "feeder bus" routes for which it is possible to buy a through ticket valid for both the rail and bus section of the journey. Travel passes and integrated ticketing (Leap Cards) for DART, Luas and Dublin Bus services were introduced in 2011.

== Gallery ==
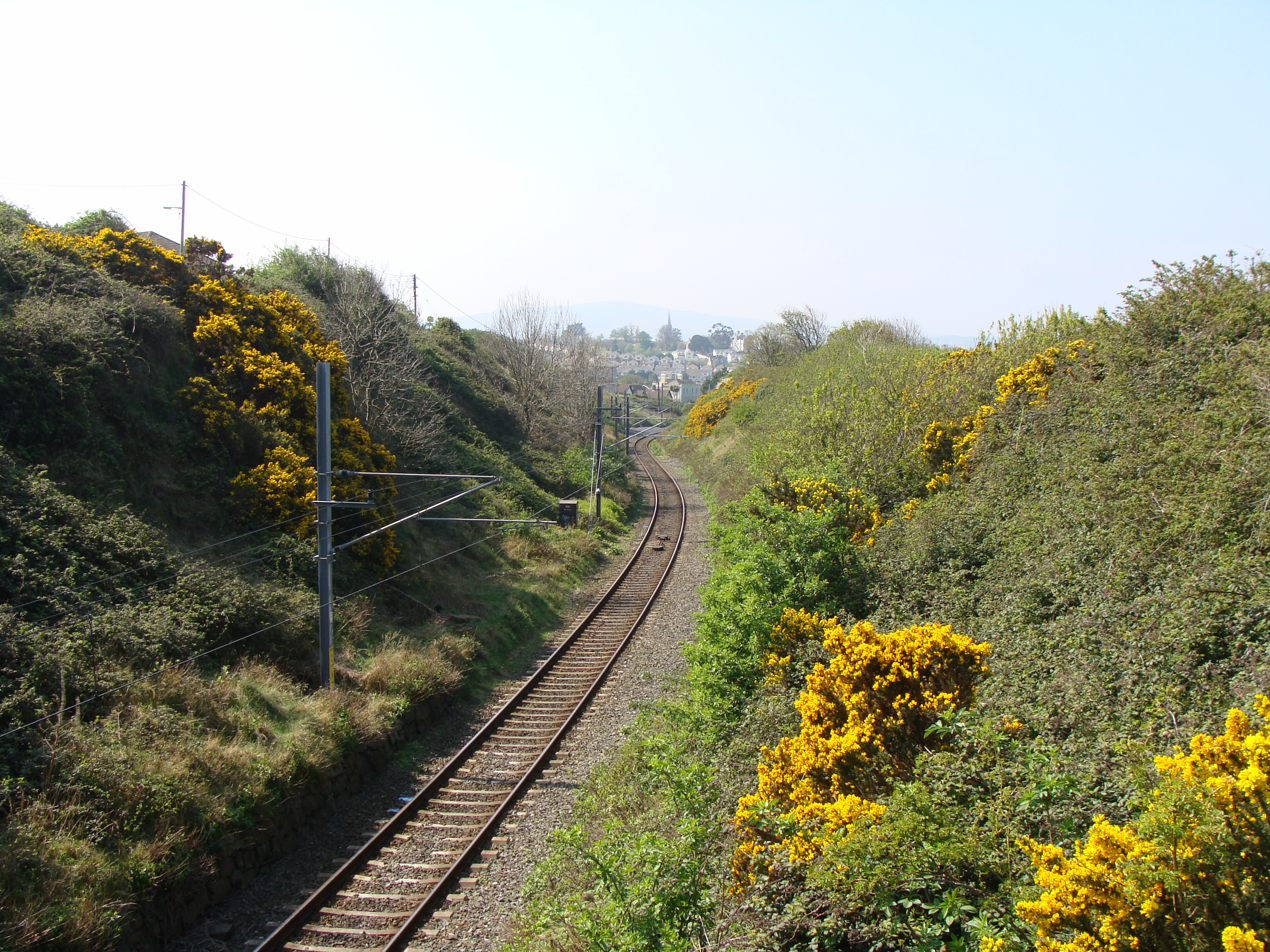
DART line in Bray, County Wicklow.

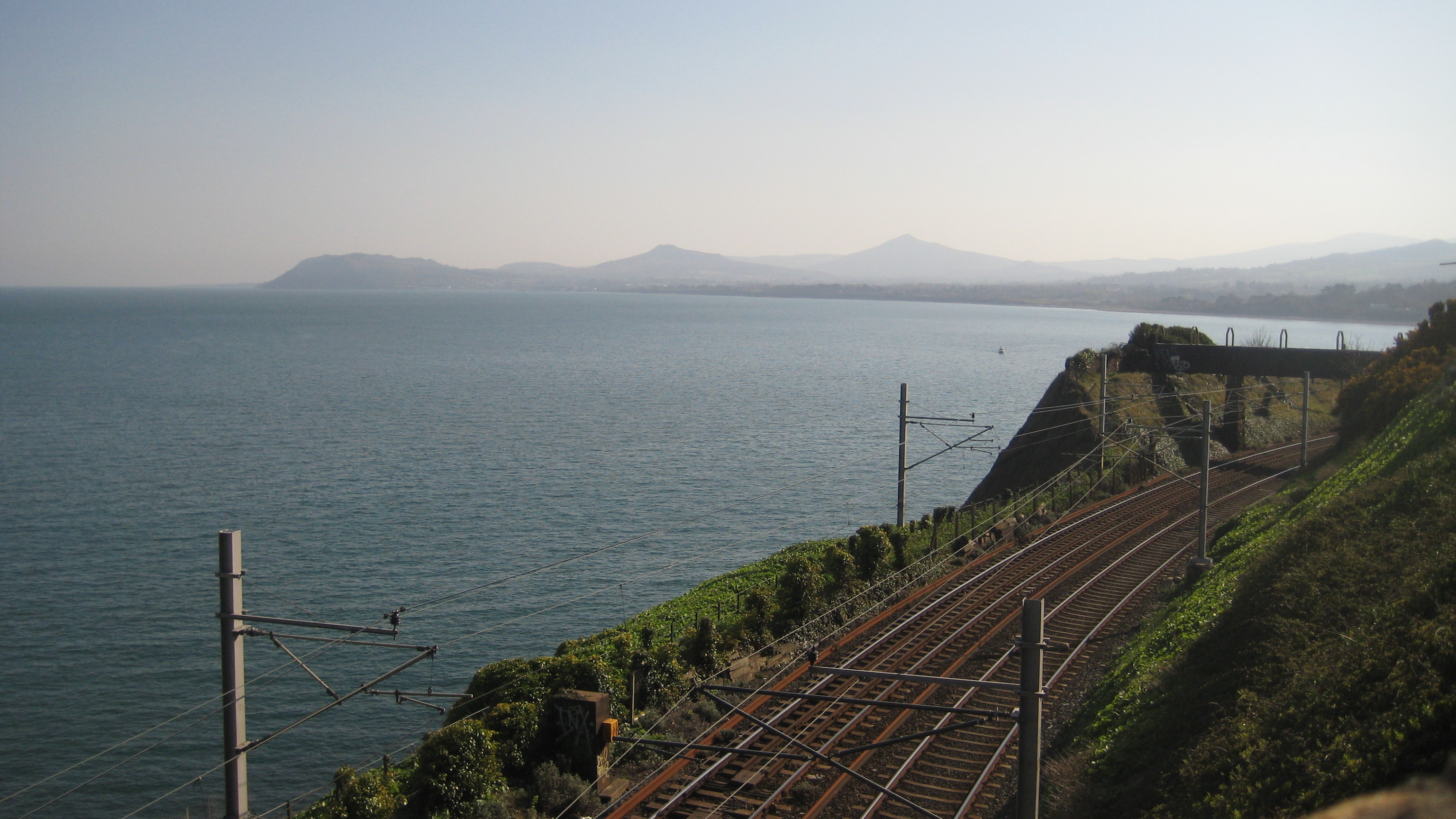
DART line in Dalkey, County Dublin.

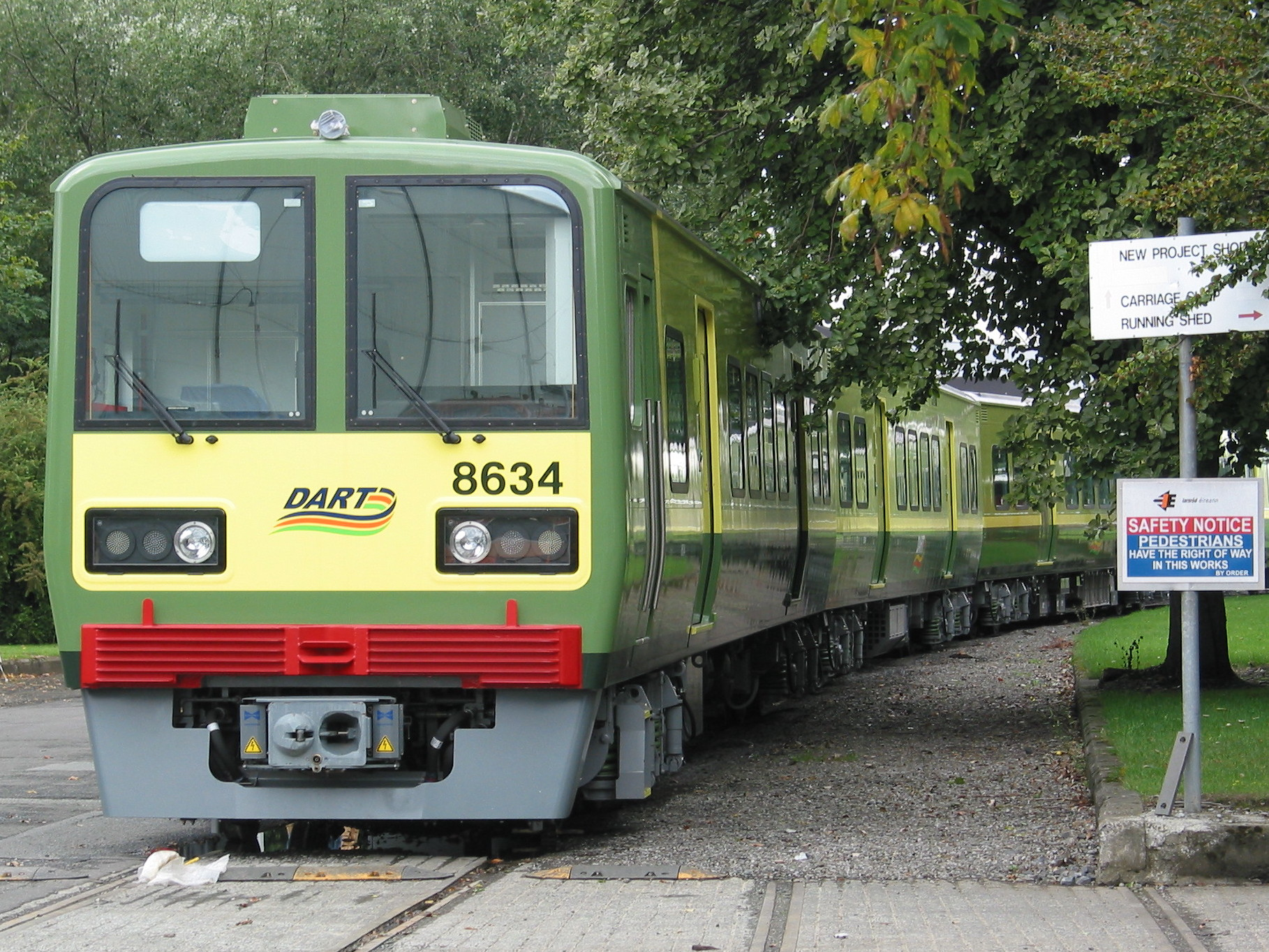
Unit 8634 at Inchicore Works shortly after delivery in 2004.

== See also ==
- Rail transport in Ireland
- Multiple units of Ireland
