= Dublin and Drogheda Railway =

Railway company in the Republic of Ireland

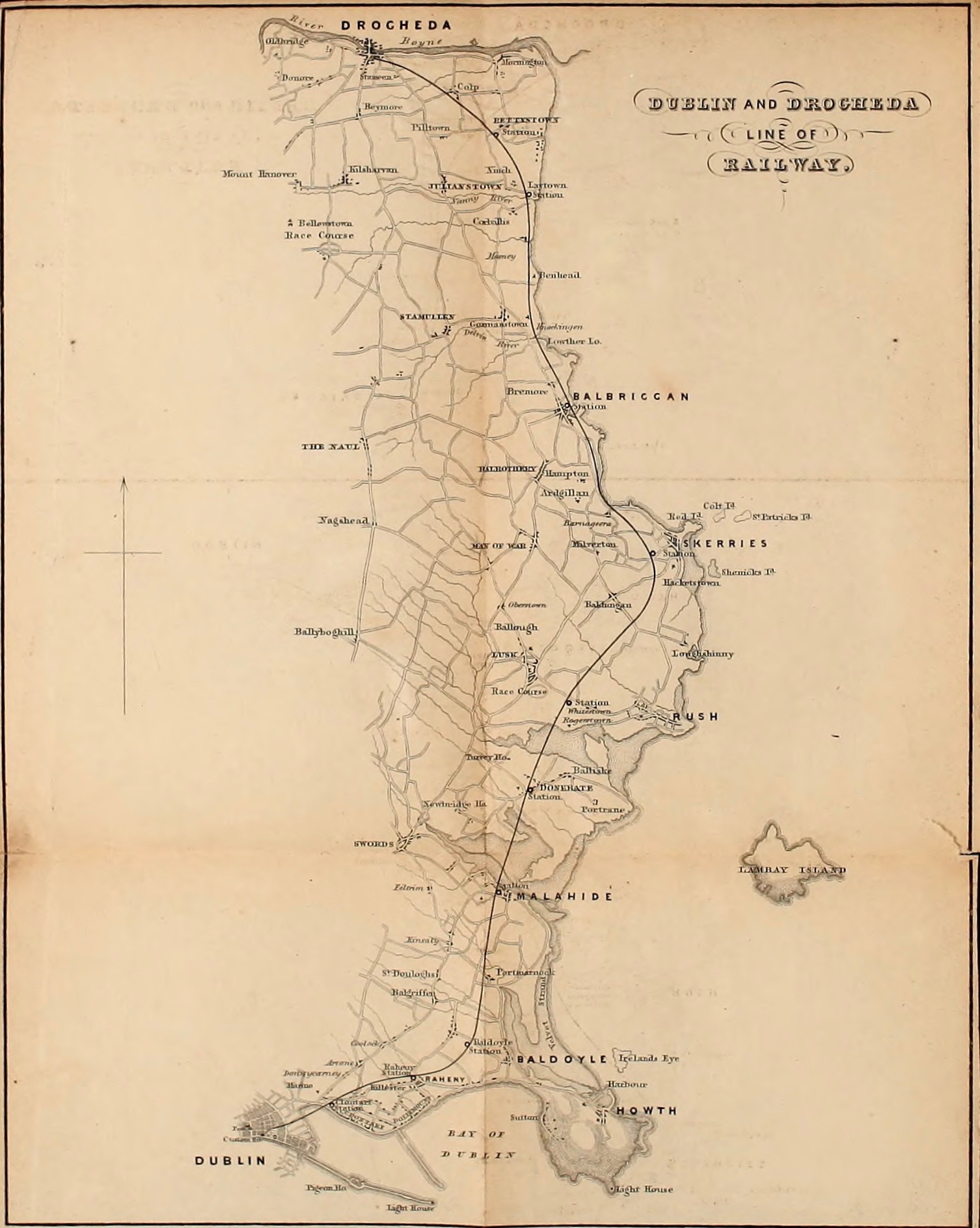
- Map of 1844 main line

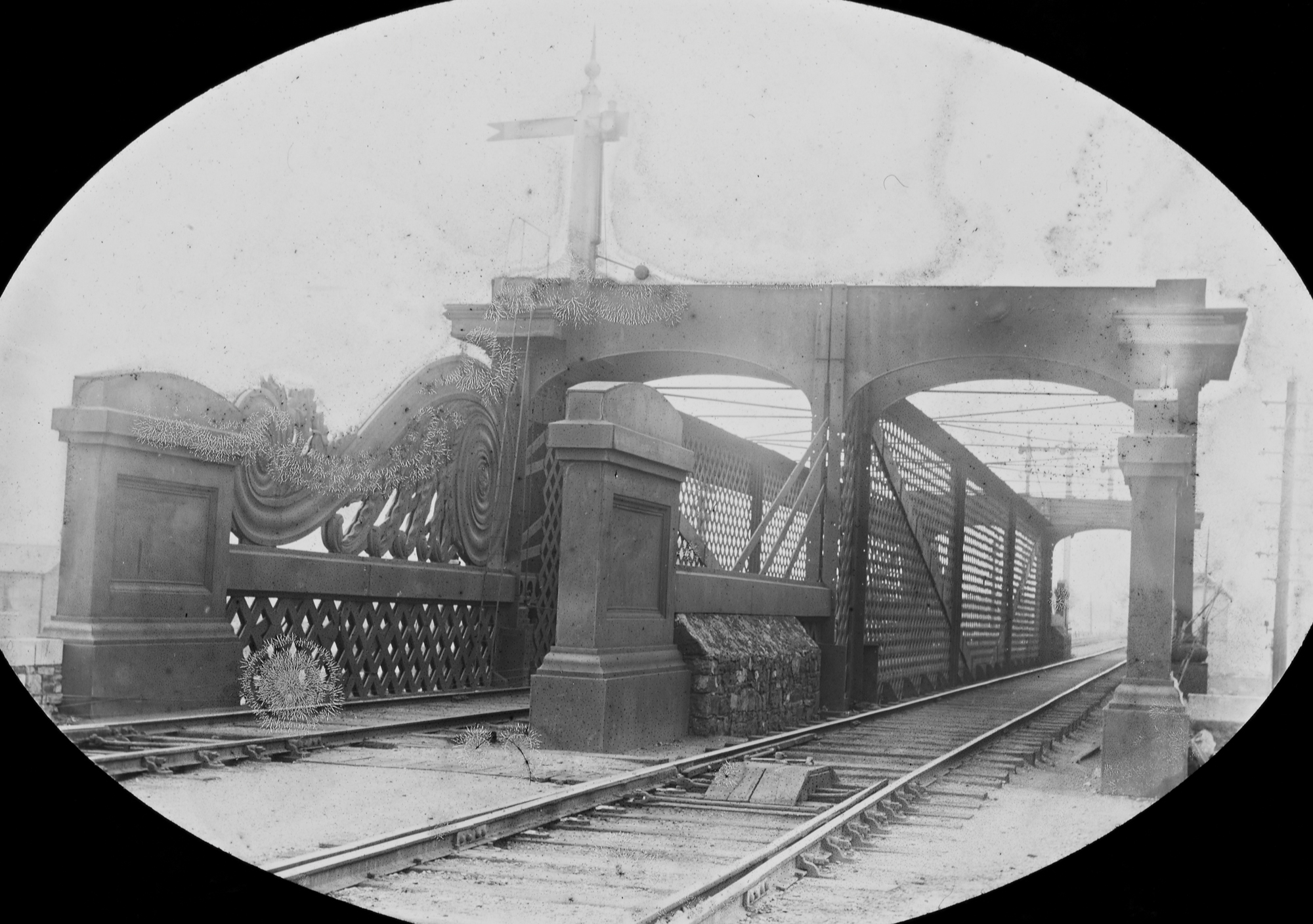
- Iron Latticework bridge over Royal Canal built 1844 taken c1890

Overview
- Headquarters: Dublin
- Locale: Ireland
- Dates of operation: 24 May 1844–1875
- Successor: Northern Railway of Ireland

Technical
- Track gauge: 5 ft 3 in (1,600 mm)
- Previous gauge: 5 ft 2 in (1,575 mm) (Note: While planned no rails of this width were laid)
- Length: 31.75 miles (51.10 km)(main line)

Other
Dublin to Drogheda
Overview
- Termini: Dublin; Drogheda
History
- Opened: 24 May 1844
Technical
- Line length: 31.75 mi (51.10 km)
Howth Branch
Overview
- Termini: Donaghmede (Howth junction); Howth
History
- Opened: 30 May 1847
Oldcastle Branch
Overview
- Termini: Drogheda; Oldcastle
History
- Opened: 17 May 1847

Dublin and Drogheda Railway (D&D) was a railway company in Ireland which publicly opened its 31¾ mile main line between Dublin and Drogheda in May 1844. It was the third railway company in Ireland to operate passenger trains and the first to use the Irish standard 5 ft 3 in (1,600 mm) gauge. It later opened branches to Howth and Oldcastle. The opening of the Dublin and Belfast Junction Railway (D&BJct) between the D&D at Drogheda and the Ulster Railway (UR) at Portadown in 1852 saw an almost continuous main line connection between Dublin and Belfast, which was resolved by the official opening of the Boyne Viaduct in April 1855. Amalgamations between these and other companies in 1875 and 1876 saw the creation of the Great Northern Railway of Ireland GNR(I).

== Origins ==
Dublin and Drogheda Railway Act 1836
- Act of Parliament
- Parliament of the United Kingdom
- Long title: An Act for making a Railway from Dublin to Drogheda.
- Citation: 6 & 7 Will. 4. c. cxxxii

Dates
- Royal assent: 13 August 1836

Text of statute as originally enacted

Dublin and Drogheda Railway Act 1837
- Act of Parliament
- Parliament of the United Kingdom
- Long title: An Act to alter the Line of the Dublin and Drogheda Railway, and to amend the Act relating thereto.
- Citation: 7 Will. 4 & 1 Vict. c. cvi

Dates
- Royal assent: 12 July 1837

Text of statute as originally enacted

Dublin and Drogheda Railway Act 1840
- Act of Parliament
- Parliament of the United Kingdom
- Long title: An Act to alter and amend the Acts passed for making a Railway from Dublin to Drogheda.
- Citation: 3 & 4 Vict. c. cvi

Dates
- Royal assent: 23 July 1840

Text of statute as originally enacted

Dublin and Drogheda Railway Act 1845
- Act of Parliament
- Parliament of the United Kingdom
- Long title: An Act to enable the Dublin and Drogheda Railway Company to make a Branch Railway to Howth; and to amend the Acts relating to such Company.
- Citation: 8 & 9 Vict. c. cxxviii

Dates
- Royal assent: 21 July 1845

Dublin and Drogheda Railway (Navan to Kells Branch) Act 1847
- Act of Parliament
- Parliament of the United Kingdom
- Long title: An Act to enable the Dublin and Drogheda Railway Company to make a Railway from the Navan Branch of the Dublin and Belfast Junction Railway in the County of Meath to the Town of Kells in the same County.
- Citation: 10 & 11 Vict. c. c

Dates
- Royal assent: 2 July 1847

Text of statute as originally enacted

Dublin and Drogheda Railway Act 1850
- Act of Parliament
- Parliament of the United Kingdom
- Long title: An Act to grant further Powers to the Dublin and Drogheda Railway Company for raising Money by the Creation of Shares, in lieu of borrowing on Mortgage; and to amend the Acts relating to the Dublin and Drogheda Railway.
- Citation: 13 & 14 Vict. c. xlv

Dates
- Royal assent: 15 July 1850

Text of statute as originally enacted

Dublin and Drogheda Railway Act 1859
- Act of Parliament
- Parliament of the United Kingdom
- Long title: An Act to enable the Dublin and Drogheda Railway Company to create Debenture Stock, and to issue new Shares for redeeming existing Preference Shares subject to Redemption, and to enlarge their Station at Dublin; and for other Purposes.
- Citation: 22 & 23 Vict. c. xxxvii

Dates
- Royal assent: 1 August 1859

Dublin and Drogheda Railway Act 1860
- Act of Parliament
- Parliament of the United Kingdom
- Long title: An Act to enable the Dublin and Drogheda Railway Company to extend their Railway from Kells to Oldcastle; and for other Purposes.
- Citation: 23 & 24 Vict. c. cxiv

Dates
- Royal assent: 3 July 1860

Dublin and Drogheda Railway (North Wall Extension) Act 1869
- Act of Parliament
- Parliament of the United Kingdom
- Long title: An Act for enabling the Dublin and Drogheda Railway Company to effect a communication between their railway and the works of the London and North-western Railway Company at the North Wall, Dublin; and for other purposes.
- Citation: 32 & 33 Vict. c. cviii

Dates
- Royal assent: 12 July 1869

Text of statute as originally enacted

Dublin and Drogheda Railway Act 1873
- Act of Parliament
- Parliament of the United Kingdom
- Long title: An Act for enabling the Dublin and Drogheda Railway Company to acquire additional Lands, and to widen Bridges; and for other purposes.
- Citation: 36 & 37 Vict. c. cxxx

Dates
- Royal assent: 7 July 1873

Text of statute as originally enacted

In 1836 the D&D presented the scheme to Parliament to construct the railway line between Dublin and Drogheda and the Dublin and Drogheda Railway Act 1836 (6 & 7 Will. 4. c. cxxxii) successfully received royal assent on 13 August 1836. Despite support of eminent engineers for the coastal route some opposing factions pressed for an inland route via Navan and some other speculative schemes resulted in litigations, delays and expense. Some savings in the project were possible when Rev Taylor of Ardgillan Castle near Balbriggan permitted the railway to pass through the demesne allowing the railway to take a more favourable and less expensive course. An amended bill presented to Parliament in February 1840 and assisted by the services of Daniel O'Connell and eventually passed as the Dublin and Drogheda Railway Act 1840 (3 & 4 Vict. c. cvi).

John MacNeill in late 1839 as the line's engineer was ratified in May 1840. By October 1840 construction was underway.

The line was proposed to be built to 5 ft 2 in (1,575 mm) gauge on the grounds of lower costs. The two broader gauges were used nowhere else. Following complaints from the UR the Board of Trade investigated the matter, and in 1843 decreed the use of 5 ft 3 in (1,600 mm).

On 20 May 1844 Major General C. W. Pasley, the Inspector General of Railways inspected the D&D slowly in one direction and with a reverse run at speed highly commended the works and recommended to the Board of Trade they permit the line to be opened on 24 May 1844. At this point only one track was open but the second was expected within a month or so.

The opening of the line occurred on 24 May 1844. (Note: Some other sources mention 25 May 1844. If may be scheduled service only started on 25 May 1845 or the discrepancy is for some other reason, for instance difference between scheduled and actual date or the first day being for a special train only)

Initially trains ran from Drogheda (the Drogheda terminus of the D&D being 1/4 mile southeast of the current Drogheda railway station) to a temporary Dublin terminus at the Royal Canal.

== Route ==
The following stations were served by the line when it opened: Royal Canal (Temporary Dublin terminus - replaced by Amiens Street Station on 29 November 1844); Clontarf; Raheny; Baldoyle; Portmarnock; Malahide; Donabate; Rush and Lusk; Skerries; Balbriggan; Gormanston; Laytown; Bettystown; Drogheda.

=== Howth branch ===
The branch line to Howth from Howth Junction and Donaghmede was inspected by Captain Simmons and opened on 30 May 1847, though the junction station from the main line was only opened on 1 October 1848. The branch had been partially opened to Sutton earlier on 30 July 1846.

=== Oldcastle branch ===
A branch from just prior to Drogheda opened to Navan on 15 February 1850; Kells on 11 June 1853; and finally opened on its full length to Oldcastle on 17 May 1863.

=== Dublin—Belfast main line ===
The Dublin to Drogheda route was to form part of the Dublin to Belfast main line. In 1845 a new railway company, Dublin and Belfast Junction Railway (D&BJct), received royal assent for the Dublin and Belfast Junction and Navan Branch Railway Act 1845 (8 & 9 Vict. c. cxxx) giving authorisation for a railway to connect the D&D at Drogheda to the Ulster Railway at Portadown, therefore creating a rail link between Dublin and Belfast. The line was completed in 1852 apart from the crossing of the Boyne. The line became operationally complete when the first train crossed the Boyne Viaduct on 5 April 1855.

== Rolling stock ==
Unlike the D&KR which used a single central buffer the D&D used twin buffers mounted above the wheels.

=== Locomotives ===
By the time of the amalgamation into the GNR(I) in 1876 the D&D had locomotives numbered up to 23 which were inherited by the new company. At that time the main line fast trains were allocated to 2-2-2 Nos. 13 to 16, built in 1859 to 1861 by Beyer-Peacock, with 6 feet 0 inches (1.83 m) driving wheels and 15x20in cylinders. There was also No. 12, a 2-4-0 express engine from the same manufacturer in 1870 with 16x21in driving wheels, this had some likeness to three similar engines build for the D&BJct between 1866 and 1868.

Other locomotives used are noted. There is note of a 2-2-2 with 5 feet 3 inches (1.60 m) driving wheels from Sharps. Grendons had built some small 2-2-2 locomotives that were later to converted to tank engines notably without brakes. Goods work was mainly handled by 0-4-2 engines, two of which were from Beyer Peacock.

The 1862 Neilson 0-6-0ST locomotive with 5 ft 6 in (1.68 m) driving wheels and 12 by 18 inches (300 mm × 460 mm) cylinders is described by Ahrons as being notable for having both side and saddle tanks and also for having the footplate fully enclosed.

== Aftermath ==
The Northern Railway of Ireland was formed by a merger of the D&D with the D&BJct in 1875; which in turn was part of the merger that formed the Great Northern Railway of Ireland in 1876.

== Model ==
The Fry Model Collection contains a model of the D&D locomotive 2-2-2T No. 8 and train. This one-off locomotive was built for and used on the Howth branch together with 2-2-2WT No. 3 built in 1844.

== Sources ==
- Ahrons, E.L. (1927). The British Steam Railway Locomotive 1825-1925. Amen Corner, London: Locomotive Publishing Co.
- — (1954). L. L. Asher (ed.). Locomotive and train working in the latter part of the nineteenth century. Vol. six. W Heffer & Sons Ltd.
- Ayres, Bob (2003). "Irish Railway Station Dates" (PDF). Irish Railway Record Society.
- Fullerton, A. (1846). The Parliamentary Gazetter of Ireland, 1844-45. Vol. 2. Dublin, London and Edinburgh: A. Fullerton & Co.
- Geraghty, P. J. (2013). "The Dublin and Drogheda Railway: the First Great Irish Speculation". Dublin Historical Record. 66 (1/2). Old Dublin Society: 83–132. JSTOR 24616055.
- Hamond, Fred; Friel, Charles (December 2007). "13 Drogheda–Oldcastle Line" (PDF). An Industrial Heritage Survey of Railways in Counties Monaghan and Louth. Monaghan CC & Louth CC (Report). Archived (PDF) from the original on 24 May 2019.
- Hunt, Freeman (1848). "From July to December, 1848". The Merchant's Magazine and Commercial Review. Vol. 19. New York.
- Jenkinson, David (August 1991). "The Fry Model Railway". Modellers' Back Track. Vol. 1, no. 3. Atlantic Transport Publishers.
- Johnston, Norman (1999). Locomotives of the GNRI. Newtownards: Colourprint Books. ISBN 1-898392-48-X. OCLC 43340833. OL 12248170M.
- McQuillan, Jack (26 August 2005). "Building the Boyne Viaduct". The Argus. Independent News and Media.
- Officers, The (1846). "Report of the Officers of the Railway Department to the Lords of the Committee of Privvy Council for Trade - For the years 1844–1845". Parliamentary Papers (Report). Vol. 39. HMSO.
- Railway, Dublin & Drogheda (1844). Handbook to the Dublin and Drogheda Railway. Dublin: N Walsh. OCLC 949843787.
