= Gormanston =

Gormanston or Gormanstown could refer to:

== County Meath, Ireland ==
- Gormanston, County Meath, a village
- Gormanston railway station
- Gormanston Camp, a military installation
- Gormanston College, a secondary school

== Other places ==
- Gormanston, Tasmania, town in Tasmania, Australia

== See also ==
- Viscount Gormanston, a title in the Peerage of Ireland
