= Star Trek: The Exhibition =

Traveling museum exhibit of Star Trek items

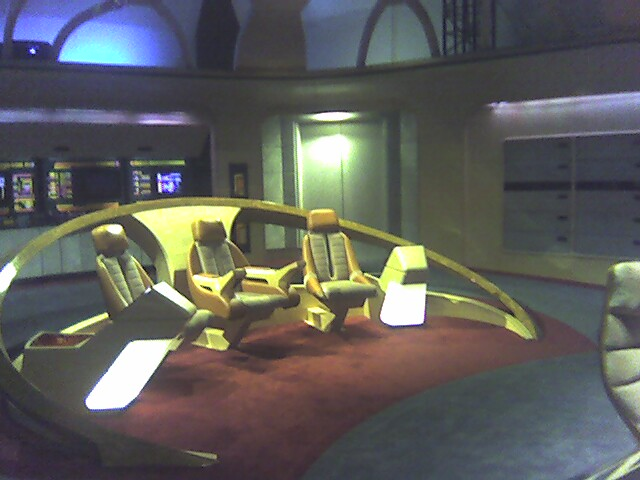
USS Enterprise D bridge replica in Star Trek: The Exhibition.

Star Trek: The Exhibition is a traveling museum display of Star Trek items and memorabilia. The exhibit includes items used in the films and television series, such as props, costumes, set components and full-scale replicas of the Enterprise bridge. Other comprehensive features of the exhibit include a complete timeline showing major events in the Star Trek Universe and how all of the various series and movies relate to each other chronologically, as well as a motion simulator ride.

Originally premiering as a single large exhibition Star Trek: The Tour under the management of SEE Touring, financial complications arose when the show was packed up on the Queen Mary in Long Beach and the venue held on to the exhibits, until it was settled by Plainfield Asset Management acquiring the entire exhibition under undisclosed terms.

The exhibition has been split into two separate smaller exhibitions which would display simultaneously in two locations. They both feature a bridge recreation. One version of the exhibit includes the bridge from Star Trek: The Original Series and replicates the Enterprise bridge from Star Trek: The Next Generation.

== Locations ==
- Museum of Science. Boston, Massachusetts. November 1992 - May 1993.
- Mosney Holiday Centre, Mosney, Ireland. Summer 1994
- City Art Centre, Edinburgh, Scotland. February to May 1995
- The Science Museum, South Kensington, London, United Kingdom. Summer 1995
- Josef Haubrich-Kunsthalle, Cologne, Germany. September 1996 – January 1997
- The Powerhouse Museum, Sydney, New South Wales, Australia. November 1997
- Queen Mary Dome, Long Beach, California. January – March 2008, as "Star Trek the Tour"
- San Diego Air and Space Museum, San Diego, California. June 2008
- Arizona Science Center, Phoenix, Arizona. November 2008 – May 2009
- Detroit Science Center, Detroit, Michigan. February – September 2009
- Franklin Institute, Philadelphia, Pennsyslvania. May – September 2009
- The Tech Museum of Innovation, San Jose, California. 2009
- Hollywood & Highland, Los Angeles, California. Fall – December 27, 2009
- Riverside Metropolitan Museum Showcase facility, Riverside, California. June 19, 2010 – February 28, 2011
- Aerospace Museum of California, North Highlands, California. May 28, 2010 – January 5, 2011
- Museo de las Ciencias Principe Felipe, Valencia, Spain. July 22, 2010 – February 22, 2011
- Louisville Science Center, Louisville, Kentucky. January 23 – May 22, 2011
- Filmpark Babelsberg, Potsdam, Germany. May – October 2011
- Kennedy Space Center, Merritt Island, Florida. June – October 2011
- Saint Louis Science Center, St. Louis, Missouri. October 2011 – May 2012
- International Drive, Orlando, Florida. May – August 2012
- Pacific National Exhibition, Vancouver, British Columbia, Canada. August 18 – September 3, 2012date=December 2021
- Pusat Sains Negara, Kuala Lumpur, Malaysia. December 13, 2012 – March 31, 2013
- Gandaria City Mall, Jakarta, Indonesia. June 1 – July 13, 2014
- Mall of America, Bloomington, Minnesota. May 16, 2014 – summer 2015
- Washington State Fair, Puyallup, Washington. September 11–27, 2015
- THE HUB Performance Center, Shanghai, China, September 1 – October 25, 2016
- Golden Mile, Blackpool, England, March 12-November 4, 2017
