= William Dargan =

Irish railway engineer (1799–1867)

William Dargan MRDS
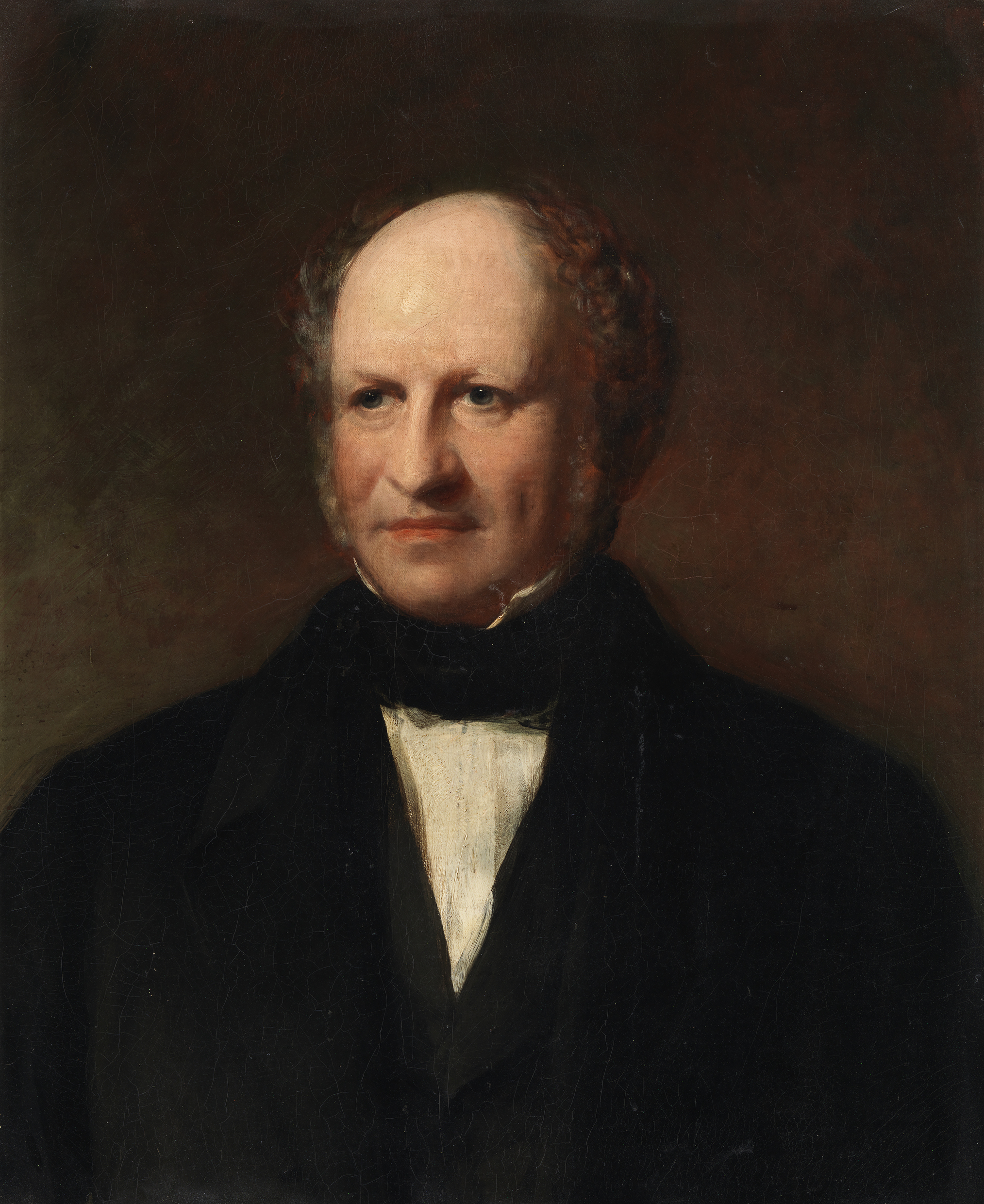
- Born: 28 February 1799; Killeshin, County Laois, Ireland
- Died: 7 February 1867 (aged 67); Dublin, Ireland
- Other name: The Father of Irish Railways

William Dargan MRDS (28 February 1799 – 7 February 1867) was arguably the most important Irish engineer of the 19th century and certainly the most important figure in railway construction. Dargan designed and built Ireland's first railway line from Dublin to Dún Laoghaire in 1833. In total he constructed over 1,300 km (800 miles) of railway to important urban centres of Ireland. He was a member of the Royal Dublin Society (RDS) and also helped establish the National Gallery of Ireland. He was also responsible for the Great Dublin Exhibition held at Leinster Lawn in 1853. His achievements were honoured in 1995, when the Dargan Railway Bridge in Belfast was opened, and again in 2004 when the Dargan Bridge in Dublin, a new cable stayed bridge for the Luas light railway, were both named after him.

== Biography ==
Dargan was born on 28 February 1799, in Killeshin in rural Queen's County (present-day County Laois), not far from Carlow town. He was the eldest in a large family of tenant farmers on the Earl of Portarlington's estate. His father, possibly also called William, was a tenant farmer, and there is nothing known about his mother. It is thought that he attended a local hedge school in Graiguecullen, Queen's County, where he excelled in mathematics and accounting. He subsequently worked on his father's 101-acre farm before securing a position in a surveyor's office in Carlow. With the assistance of prominent local people, particularly John Alexander, a prominent Carlow miller, and Henry Parnell MP for Queen's County, Dargan began working with the Scottish engineer Thomas Telford on the Holyhead side of the London–Holyhead road. He worked there between 1819 and 1824. In 1824 Telford asked Dargan to begin work on Howth Road, from Raheny to Sutton in Dublin. The young Dargan earned the relatively large sum of £300 for his work on this road and this provided the capital for future public works investments. Henry Parnell MP described this road as "a model for other roads in the vicinity of Dublin". Around the same time Dargan contributed roads in Dublin and in counties Carlow and Louth as a surveyor. Dargan also served as assistant manager for about three years on the Birmingham and Liverpool Junction Canal and the Middlewich Branch, two canals in the English midlands.

On 13 October 1828, William Dargan married Jane Arkinstall at the Anglican Church of St Michael and All Angels in Adbaston, Staffordshire. He and Jane did not produce any offspring.

When Dargan came back to Ireland, he was occupied by minor construction projects, including rebuilding the main street of Banbridge and the 13 kilometers long Kilbeggan branch of the Grand Canal. After Irish parliament decided to launch a plan for the very first railway, the Dublin and Kingstown Railway in 1825, Dargan had become increasingly invested in this project. To fight against the skepticism of any railway program in Ireland, Dargan spent a considerable amount of unpaid time promoting this first railway of Ireland, working along with engineer Charles Vignoles to plan the route. After a persistent effort of Dargan, the Dublin and Kingstown Railway was able to be opened on 17 December 1834, with eight trains in each direction, at full capacity. He next constructed the water communication between Lough Erne and Belfast, afterwards known as the Ulster Canal, a signal triumph of engineering and constructive ability. He was also the engineer for the Belfast waterworks, two reservoirs located in the Old Park district of north Belfast, completed in 1842.

Other great works followed – the Dublin and Drogheda Railway, the Great Southern and Western Railway and the Midland Great Western Railway. By 1853 he had constructed over six hundred miles of railway, and he had then contracts for two hundred more. He paid the highest wages with the greatest punctuality, and his credit was unbounded. At one time he was the largest railway projector in Ireland and one of its greatest capitalists.

Dargan had a strong sense of patriotism to Ireland. He was offered a knighthood by the British Viceroy in Ireland, but declined. Following this, Queen Victoria visited Dargan at his residence, Dargan Villa, Mount Annville on 29 August 1853. She offered him a baronetcy, but he declined this also. Wishing to encourage the growth of flax, he then took a tract of land whose culture he devoted himself to, but owing to some mismanagement the enterprise entailed a heavy loss. He also became a manufacturer, and set some mills working in Chapelizod, near Dublin, but that business did not prosper.

In 1860, continuing his branching out into different business ventures, Dargan brought the International Hotel in Bray from John Quin. Another hotel named Hayes Royal Hotel in Kingstown was also subsequently bought in 1863 by Dargan with elaborate plans for extension. Financial issues meant that these plans were abandoned, and the original hotel was simply remodelled to fit Dargan's original purpose. From the original design envisioned, the only pieces realised were the centrepiece and south wing. Architect John McCurdy had originally intended to add a right-hand wing to the hotel but none of this came to be. The hotel was rechristened as the Royal Marine Hotel and opened in September 1865. It is understood that the financial difficulties encountered during the purchasing and building of the hotel exacerbated Dargan's financial issues, eventually leading to economic ruin.

Latterly he devoted himself chiefly to the working and extension of the Dublin, Wicklow and Wexford Railway, of which he was chairman. In 1866 he was seriously injured by a fall from his horse. He died at 2 Fitzwilliam Square East, Dublin, on 7 February 1867, and was buried in Glasnevin cemetery. His widow, Jane, was granted a civil list pension of £100 on 18 June 1870.

== Dargan and the 1853 Dublin Exhibition ==
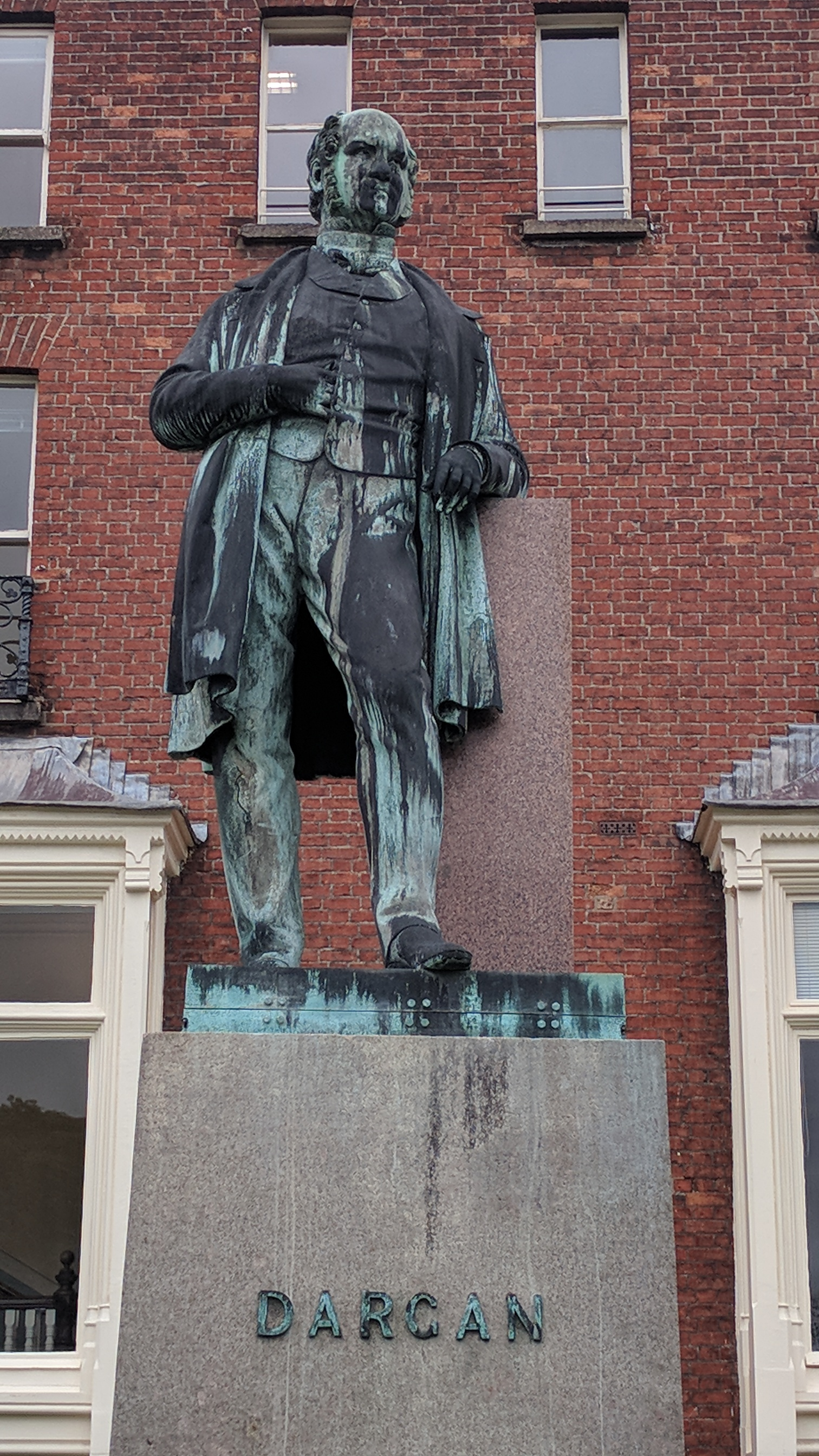
Statue of William Dargan in Dublin

The Royal Dublin Society elected Dargan as a life member in November 1851. After attending the Crystal Palace Exhibition of 1851, William Dargan proposed to the society with an extended exhibition, with an offer of £20,000 of funding.

As the committee of the 1853 Exhibition believed that this event would be self-financing, mainly relying on Dargan's contribution of £20,000, it was announced that there would be no cash donations taken. After the building costs had risen by the autumn of 1852, the committee was forced to make a public subscription, but Dargan offered another £6,000 as patronage. It eventually reached to the point that Dargan personally funded this exhibition with a considerable amount of £88,000. Dublin Exhibition received many visitors. Although there were only 400 people on the first two days, this number rose to 4,000 a week later, and to 5,000 on the following day. The British royal party arrived at Dun Laoghaire on 29 August 1853 at the purpose to attend the exhibition, and Queen Victoria personally met William Dargan.

Prince Albert commented both on Dargan and the Dublin Exhibition, "Mr Dargan is the man of the people. He is a simple, unobtrusive, retiring man, a thorough Irishman, not always quite sober of an evening, industrious, kind to his workmen, but the only man who has by his own determination & courage put a stop to every strike or combination of workmen, of which the Irish are so fond. All he has done has been done on the field of Industry & not of politics or Religion, without the Priest or factious conspiracy, without the promise of distant extraordinary advantages but with immediate apparent benefit. The Exhibition, which must be pronounced to be very successful, has done wonders in this respect. A private undertaking, unaided by Govt, or any Commission with Royal Authority, made and erected at the sole expense of a single Individual, & this an Irish Road contractor, not long ago a common labourer himself, who had raised himself solely by his own industry & energy, - it deserves the greatest credit & is looked upon by the Irish with infinite self-satisfaction as an emblem of national hope".

William Dargan ultimately lost £20,000 on the venture. At the close of the exhibition, the Irish National Gallery was built on Leinster Lawn, as a monument to Dargan, with a fine bronze statue of him in front of it, looking out upon Merrion Square.

== Works ==
- MacNeill's Egyptian Arch
- Ulster Canal
- The Cut, Banbridge
- Kilnap Viaduct
- Cork railway tunnel

== See also ==
- History of rail transport in Ireland
