= Cork railway tunnel =

Railway tunnel in Cork, Ireland

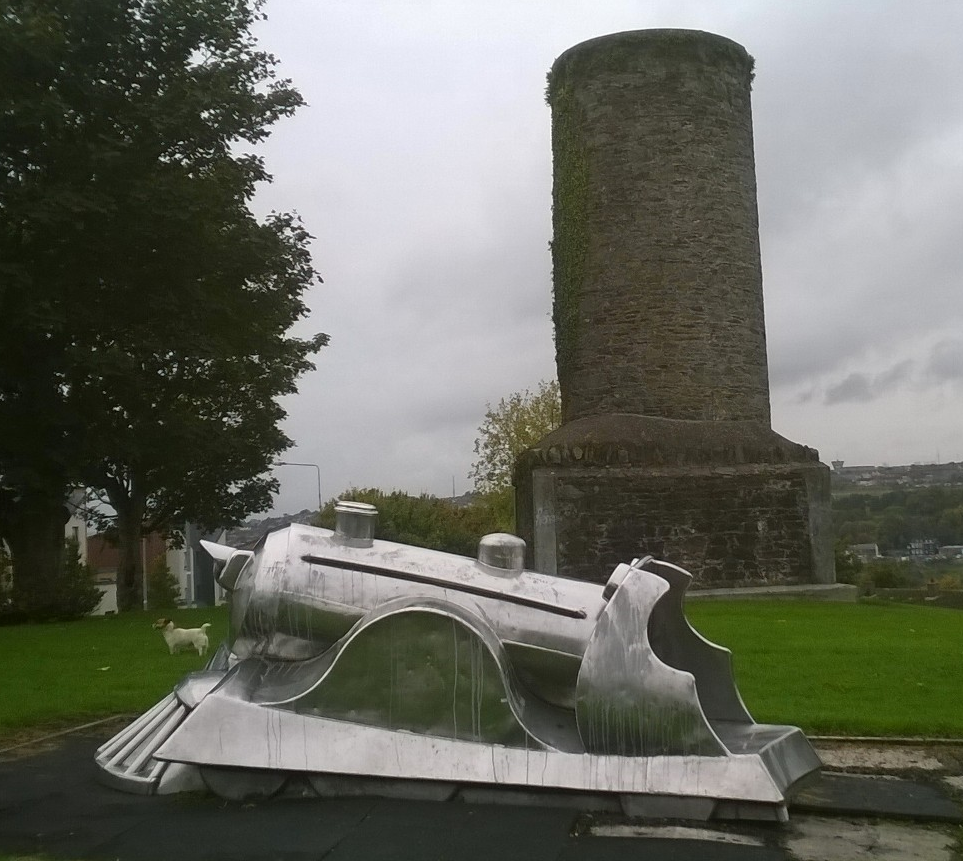
- One of four ventilation shafts constructed for the tunnel
- Interactive map of Cork railway tunnel

Overview
- Location: Cork, Ireland
- Coordinates: 51.9126°N 8.4694°W
- Route: Kent Station to Dublin–Cork railway line
- Start: Cork Kent railway station
- End: Dublin–Cork railway line

Operation
- Work began: 1847
- Opened: 1855
- Owner: Iarnród Éireann
- Operator: Iarnród Éireann
- Character: Through-rail passenger and freight

Technical
- Line length: 1,355 yards (1,200 m)
- No. of tracks: Double track
- Track gauge: Irish gauge

The Cork railway tunnel is a railway tunnel in Cork, Ireland. The 1.2-kilometre (0.75 mi) tunnel was built between 1847 and 1855 and runs from Blackpool to Kent Station on the Lower Glanmire Road. It is the longest operational rail tunnel in Ireland, and is included on the Record of Protected Structures maintained by Cork City Council.

== Development ==
The tunnel was designed by architect John Benjamin Macneill for Great Southern and Western Railway (GSWR) and built by contractor William Dargan. The initial route was proposed to follow the Blackpool valley and the Kiln River. This was discounted because of the cost of property acquisition. A second route was considered along the Glen River Valley. However, the topography was found to be too steep. The third, and ultimately selected, route was for the tunnel to be bored through a sandstone ridge.

Work began on the selected route in August 1847 with the sinking of ventilation shafts, the external structures of which remain visible over the route of the tunnel. Tunneling works were undertaken simultaneously from both ends of the tunnel in 1847, and the construction headings met under Victoria (now Collins) Barracks on 29 July 1854. A few days later, the chairman, some directors, a secretary, and an engineer of GSWR walked the full length of the tunnel.

Two men died during construction of the tunnel, and many more were injured, when a mistimed explosives blast occurred on 13 March 1850. A commemorative plaque to the two men, Michael Driscoll (24) and John McDonnell (30), was dedicated where the modern road bridge passes over the northern mouth of the tunnel at The Glen.

The tunnel, which averages at 24 feet (7.3 m) in height and 28 feet (8.5 m) in width, is supported by a three-ring brick arch which, reputedly, required several million bricks from Youghal brickworks. The tunnel construction was difficult, with progress at one point falling "as low as three feet per week". Construction took seven years and completed in 1855.

Many tonnes of red sandstone, extracted during the tunneling, was used in a number of subsequent construction projects in the city.

== Operation ==
First opened to traffic on 3 December 1855, the tunnel remains in use and described, as of the early 21st century, as "the longest operational tunnel in Ireland".

The tunnel serves several routes from Kent station, including the main Dublin–Cork railway line. Track works, which involved closing the tunnel for 10 days, were undertaken during October 2021.

== See also ==
- Kilnap Viaduct
