= Skerries railway station =

Railway station in County Dublin, Ireland

Skerries Na Sceirí
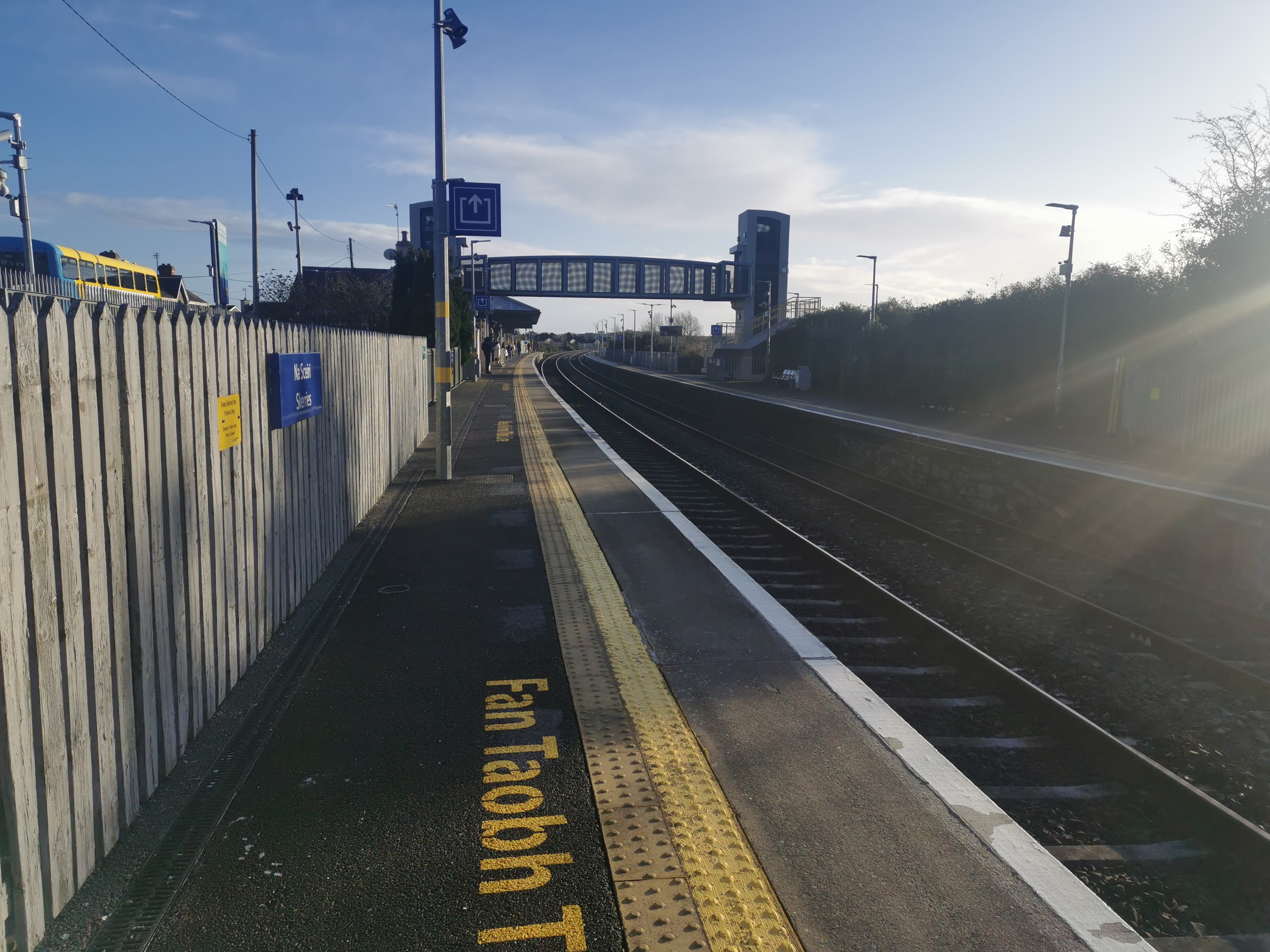
- View of the station from the north end of platform 1.

General information
- Location: Station Road, Skerries; County Dublin; Ireland
- Coordinates: 53°34′27″N 6°07′10″W
- Owner: Iarnród Éireann
- Line: Belfast–Dublin line
- Platforms: 2
- Tracks: 2
- Bus operators: Dublin Bus; Go-Ahead Ireland
- Connections: 33; 33A; 33E; 33N; 33X

Construction
- Structure type: At-grade

Other information
- Station code: SKRES
- Fare zone: Suburban 4

History
- Opened: 25 May 1844

Services
Preceding station	Iarnród Éireann	Following station
Rush and Lusk towards Dublin Connolly or Grand Canal Dock	Commuter Northern Commuter	Balbriggan towards Dundalk Clarke
Former services
Preceding station	Disused railways	Following station
Rush and Lusk; Line and station open	Dublin and Drogheda Railway	Aardgillan; Line open, station closed
Skerries Golf Club Halt; Line open, station closed	Great Northern Railway; Dublin–Belfast main line	Balbriggan; Line and station open
Future services
Preceding station	Future services	Following station
Rush and Lusk	DART; Line 2	Balbriggan
Route map
Location

Skerries railway station (Irish: Stáisiún na Sceirí) serves Skerries in County Dublin, Ireland.

== History ==
The station opened on 25 May 1844 with the opening of the Dublin and Drogheda Railway and has continuously served passengers since, but has been closed for freight purposes since 2 December 1974.

== Description ==
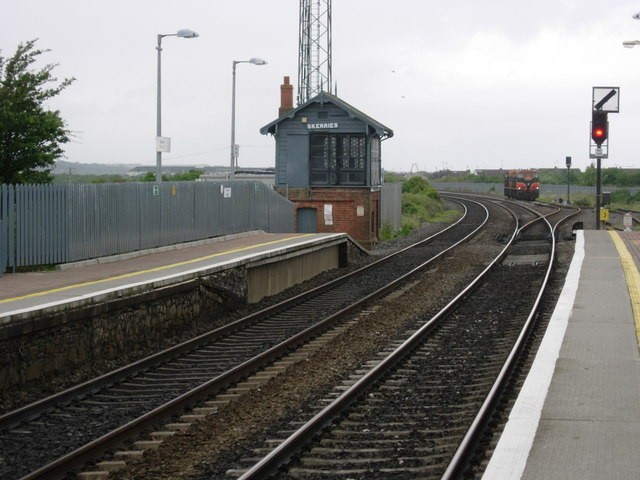
View north from Platform 1 depicting the brake house on Platform 2.

The station has two platforms for the lines that run through the station, with a footbridge connecting the platforms. An underpass was open for passenger use, but was permanently closed on Wednesday, 31 August 2016. Platform 1 runs mostly to the south, while platform 2 runs mostly to the north. The station is 1.6 kilometres from the Martello tower on Red Island, and 8 kilometres from Rockabill lighthouse.

== Services ==
Irish Rail's Commuter service, operated by the 29000 and 22000 Class DMU fleets, is the only service that stops at the station. Other trains that pass through include the Dublin to Belfast Enterprise service, the Tara Mine zinc ore freight train led by 071 class trains, and out of service transfer intercity trains, which primarily use IE 22000 DMU class trains.

== Proposed expansion ==
As part of Project Ireland 2040, the DART is proposed to be extended to Drogheda on the Northern Line serving Donabate, Rush and Lusk, Skerries, Balbriggan and on to Drogheda.

== See also ==
- List of railway stations in Ireland

== Bibliography ==
- Ayres, Bob (2003). "Irish Railway Station Dates" (PDF). Irish Railway Record Society.
