= Mosney railway station =

Railway station in Mosney, Ireland

Mosney Maigh Muirí

General information
- Location: Mosney; County Meath; Ireland
- Coordinates: 53.66161°N 6.23169°W
- Line: Dublin–Belfast railway line
- Platforms: 1
- Tracks: 2

Construction
- Structure type: At-grade
- Parking: No

History
- Original company: Great Northern Railway (Ireland)

Key dates
- 1948: Opened as private holiday-camp station
- 2 June 1958: Opened to public traffic
- 29 August 2000: Last seasonal holiday services
- 15 January 2001: Passenger services resumed
- 31 December 2001: Passenger services withdrawn

Former services
Preceding station	Former services	Following station
Gormanston; Line and station open	Arrow; Northern Arrow	Laytown; Line and station open
Gormanston; Line and station open	Iarnród Éireann; Northern Commuter (2001)	Laytown; Line and station open

Historical railways
Preceding station	Historical railways	Following station
Gormanston; Line and station open	Great Northern Railway (Ireland); Dublin–Belfast (1948–1958)	Laytown; Line and station open
Gormanston; Line and station open	Córas Iompair Éireann; Dublin–Drogheda	Laytown; Line and station open
Route map
Location
- Location within Ireland Location within island of Ireland

Mosney railway station (Irish: Maigh Muirí) was a railway station on the Dublin–Belfast railway line at Mosney, County Meath, Ireland. It opened in 1948 to serve the nearby Butlin's holiday camp, and later served regular passengers until the withdrawal of its final services in December 2001.

== History ==
The station opened in 1948 under the Great Northern Railway (Ireland) as a private station serving Butlin's Mosney holiday camp. Holidaymakers arriving by train could access the camp directly from the railway station.

On 2 June 1958, the station was opened to public passenger traffic. It subsequently came under the operation of Córas Iompair Éireann following the dissolution of the Great Northern Railway Board, and later Iarnród Éireann.

During the late twentieth century, Mosney was served by seasonal trains associated with the holiday camp, including services forming part of the Northern suburban railway network.

The last seasonal holiday services operated on 29 August 2000, and the station ceased its seasonal passenger operation. However, passenger services resumed on 15 January 2001 to serve residents of the former holiday camp, which had been converted into an accommodation centre for asylum seekers. These services continued until 31 December 2001, when the final passenger service was withdrawn.

The station is situated between Gormanston and Laytown. Although the station is closed, trains on the Dublin–Belfast main line continue to pass the former station site.

== See also ==
- List of railway stations in Ireland
