= MacNeill's Egyptian Arch =

Railway bridge in Northern Ireland

Coordinates: 54.18559°N 6.36203°W

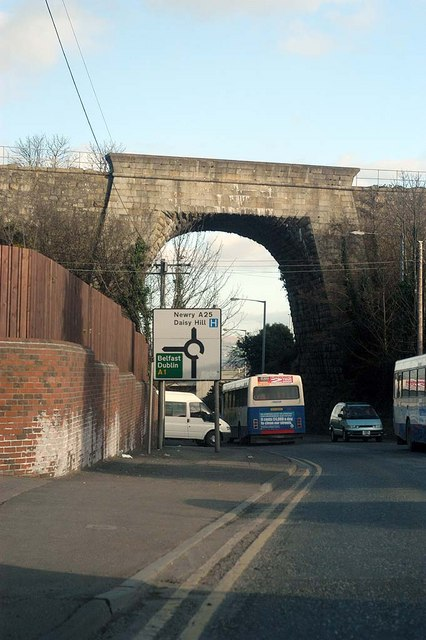
Macneill's Egyptian Arch

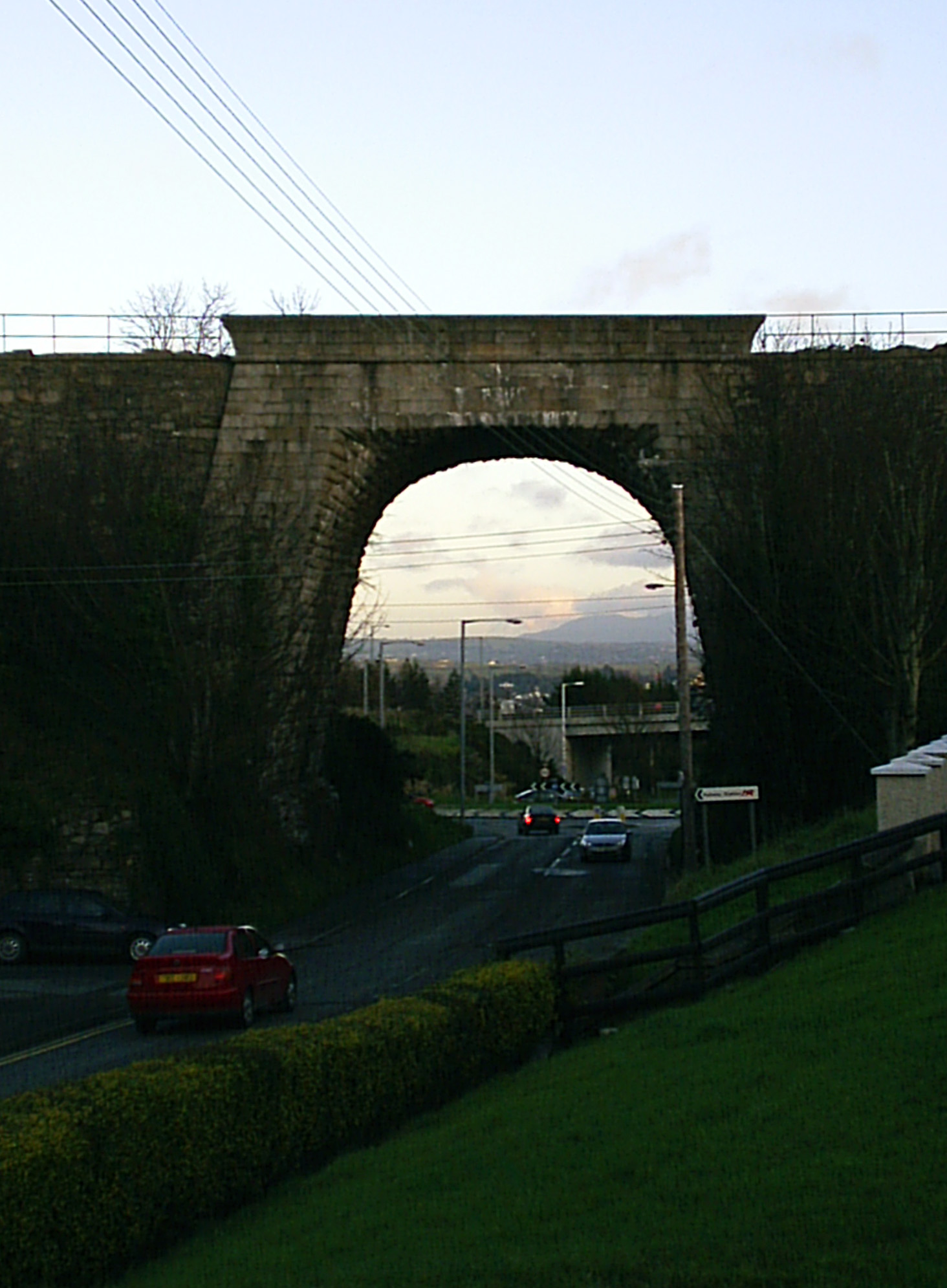
Macneill's Egyptian Arch, from the West side

Macneill's Egyptian Arch is a railway bridge in Newry, Northern Ireland. Construction was completed in 1851 for the Dublin and Belfast Junction Railway Company and was the result of collaboration between engineer Sir John Macneill and constructor William Dargan. Locally known as the Egyptian Arch, the rail bridge passes over the Newry–Camlough Road, in the County Armagh half of Newry.

It is located approximately 5 miles from the border between Northern Ireland and the Republic of Ireland on the Dublin–Belfast railway line. It is located less than 1 mile along the line from the 18 Arches viaduct, also known as the Craigmore Viaduct.

The Egyptian Arch gained its name from its resemblance to the nemes headdress worn by Ancient Egyptian pharaohs. The bridge was selected for the design of the £1 coin to represent Northern Ireland for 2006. All four of the bridge design pound coins for each constituent part of the UK were designed by wood engraver Edwina Ellis in a Royal Mint design competition.

The bridge was also the location of the Egyptian Arch Ambush of 13 December 1920.
