= Butlin's Mosney =

Former holiday camp in County Meath, Ireland

Mosney Accommodation Centre
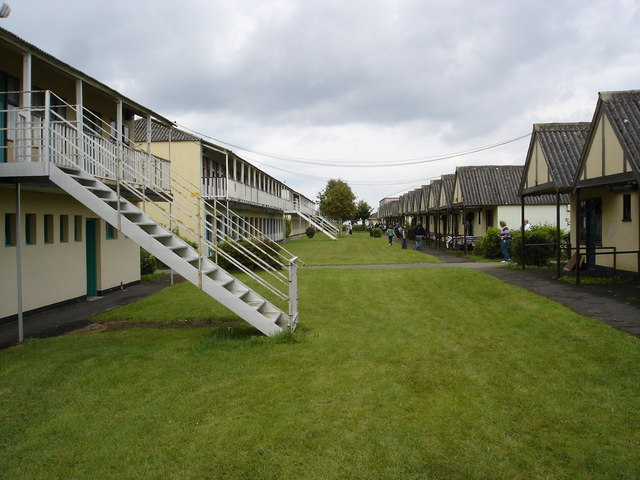

- Location within Ireland
- Location: Mosney
- Coordinates: 53°39′40″N 6°14′35″W
- Subsequent names: Butlin's Mosney (1948-1982); Mosney Holiday Centre (1982-2000); Mosney Accommodation Centre (2000 onwards) [Run under contract on behalf of the International Protection Accommodation Services within the Department of Children, Equality, Disability, Integration and Youth]
- Operated by: Mosney plc
- Established: 17 May 1947; 79 years ago
- Website: http://www.mosney.ie/

Mosney Accommodation Centre (formerly Butlin's Mosney and Mosney Holiday Centre) is located in Mosney, County Meath, Ireland and is situated approximately 48 km (30 mi) from Dublin. It is probably best known as the site of a Butlin's holiday camp in the second half of the 20th century and as the site for the national finals of the Community Games. By the early 21st-century, this had been converted into an accommodation centre for asylum-seekers. The centre was served by Mosney railway station, which closed down in 2000. Currently, it ranks as the biggest earning direct provision Centre in Ireland.

== History ==
=== Butlin's Mosney ===
Mosney was the first Butlin's camp outside the UK. In most ways Mosney was identical to Butlin's existing camps. Multiple complaints appeared in the Catholic Standard, warning that holiday camps were an English idea that was not desirable in Ireland. Like the other camps, Mosney was designed to have a church and reassurances were given that it would be a Catholic chapel with a resident priest. Reassurances were also given that Irish nationals would have priority over British tourists in booking holidays. It was registered on 17 May 1947, and in July 1948, the camp was finally opened by William Norton, who was the Minister for Social Welfare, and it operated successfully as a Butlin's camp until the early 1980s.

=== Mosney Holiday Centre ===
In 1982, Butlin's sold the camp, which was renamed Mosney Holiday Centre. The camp continued without substantive changes. Every year more than 6,000 children from around the country travelled to Mosney to take part in the Community Games, held in Mosney for 25 years. Mosney was the only location in Ireland that had the required 2,500 beds. Each June, the Lions Club took over the centre and provided holidays for 1,200 local people. The last season for Mosney was 2000. Dwindling visitor numbers and problems finding staff for the short 12-week season eventually led to the camp's closure.

=== Mosney Accommodation Centre ===
In December 2000, a five-year deal was signed with the government to turn Mosney into an asylum seeker accommodation centre. Mosney is now home to around 600 asylum seekers from over 20 different countries. Most of the old attractions have been mothballed, but recreation facilities still included a football arena, table tennis and a supervised play area. There is a 2007 documentary called "Seaview" featuring interviews with asylum seekers and staff from the camp.

The deal to use the camp has been renewed periodically since 2005, with a fluctuating contracted capacity.

== Related ==
- Trabolgan Holiday Village, County Cork
- Red Island Holiday Camp, County Dublin
