= Gormanston Camp =

Military camp in Ireland

- Campa Rinn Mhic Ghormáin
- Gormanston, County Meath
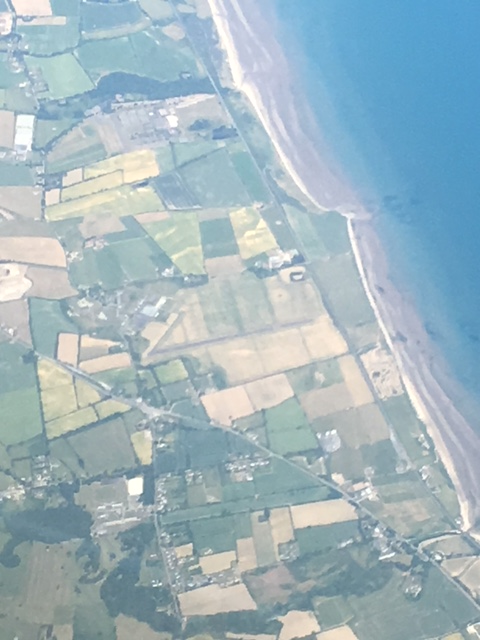
- Disused airfield at Gormanston Camp

Site information
- Type: Barracks
- Operator: (Republic of Ireland) Irish Army

Location
- Location within Ireland
- Coordinates: 53.64410°N 6.23500°W

Site history
- Built: 1917
- Built for: War Office
- In use: 1917 – present

Gormanston Camp (Irish: Campa Rinn Mhic Ghormáin) is a military camp in Ireland and consists of approximately 260 acres. It is used for air-ground and air-defence training. It is located between Balbriggan and Drogheda along the east coastline of Ireland in County Meath in close proximity to the M1 Motorway and Gormanston railway station.

== Early years ==
The camp started life as a Royal Flying Corps training depot as RFC Gormanston during the First World War in 1917. On 1 April 1918 the RFC was amalgamated with the Royal Naval Air Service to form the Royal Air Force and the airfield became RAF Station Gormanston. After the end of the War the aerodrome there started to be wound down, so by the end of January 1920. The remaining aircraft were transferred to RAF Baldonnel Aerodrome and the station was placed under care and maintenance by a team of 37 officers and airmen.

=== War of Independence ===
The Irish War of Independence did not have any effect on the winding down of Gormanston, as aircraft were not deemed to be of any use to the guerrilla type of war that was taking place. From August 1920 to August 1922 Gormanston was used by the Royal Irish Constabulary Black and Tans as a sub-depot for the training of new recruits, and as well as a despatch centre to send Black and Tans all over the country. The officers were responsible for a policy of drunken violence beating up local communities. Andy Cope, deputy of the British commander-in-chief in Ireland, General Sir Nevil Macready, visited Gormanston and Balbriggan after the outrages; he and Sir Mark Sturgis concluded that the RIC was not out of control, but the reprisals were the fault of poor leadership from the officers, as well as lack of training and drill.

The evacuation of the force was meant to be completed by 31 March 1922, but due to delays it was August before the last Black and Tans left Gormanstown and the camp was handed over to the National Army. This was during the Irish Civil War which started on 28 June 1922. Gormanstown then became the Headquarters of the Transport Section of the National Army with the ceremonial opening of the base as an Irish army facility taking place on 8 October 1922.

== Internment camp ==
An Internment camp was then built in Gormanston to house the vast numbers of Republican prisoners that were captured by the Irish Free State. The Internment camp was under the command of Commandant Morken. The first prisoners to be interned in the camp arrived on 9 September 1922 and there were about 1,000 Republican prisoners interned there, the internees included Oscar Traynor who was made OC by the prisoners, and famous names like Tom Barry who escaped on 28 September 1922, Seán T. O'Kelly, Connie McNamara and author Frank O'Connor.

Although the Civil War ended on 24 May 1923, the Free State continued to hold over 12,000 Republican prisoners as hostages throughout Ireland to ensure hostilities did not break out again. A hunger strike was organised by Republican commandant Oscar Traynor in October 1923 to protest at conditions in the camp as well as continued internment. The last prisoners left the camp in December 1923.

== World War II ==
During World War II (known colloquially in Ireland as "The Emergency"), the camp was used as accommodation for up to 2,000 men who were billeted in forty Nissen huts and the camp was used for a time as an internment camp for the detention of up to 40 RAF aircrews who had crashed landed or made emergency landings in the state. The RAF prisoners were repatriated in two groups one in 1943 and the remainder in May 1944. The airfield had been used on an annual basis since 1935, it was not until 1945 that the Air Corps occupied the camp on a permanent basis. No 1 Fighter Squadron was stationed there in 1944 and were equipped with Hawker Hurricanes.

=== Post-war years ===
After the war the Hurricanes were replaced with Spitfires in 1947, and in 1956 the Fighter Squadron was transferred to Baldonnel Aerodrome (also known as Casement Aerodrome), whilst an Air Corps training faculty remained at the station.

Due to the escalation in civil strife in Northern Ireland in the summer of 1969, Gormanston was designated as a refugee centre in August 1969. Large numbers of people mainly from Belfast moved southwards to escape the violence and were housed in the refugee camp. By the end of October 1971 up to 12,000 persons had passed through the camp.

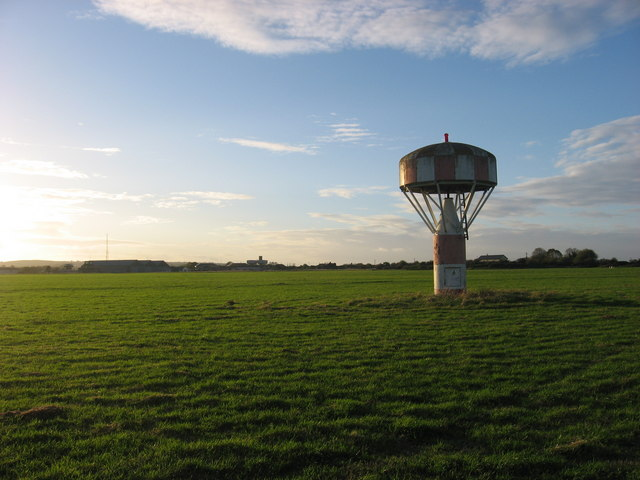
Disused aerodrome, Gormanston.

The airfield was closed officially from 2002 but it is still used extensively for Air to Ground Firing and local army activities. Both runways at the airfield are unserviceable (originally three runways), however, it is believed since Gormanston tower and approach is still active, the tarmac runway is still in a good enough condition to be used in an emergency.

== See also ==
- List of Irish military installations

== References and sources ==
Notes

Sources

- Townshend, C, The Republic: The Fight For Irish Independence (Penguin 2014)
- Bennet, R, The Black and Tans (London 1959)
- Dolan, Anne, 'Killing, and Bloody Sunday, November 1920', Historical Journal 49 (2006)
- Fitzpatrick, D, 'Militarism in Ireland 1900-1922' in T Bartlett & K Jeffrey (eds.), A Military History of Ireland (Cambridge 1996)
- Hart, P, British Intelligence in Ireland, 1920-1921: The Final Report (Cork 2002)
- Hopkinson, M, The Last Days of Dublin Castle: The Diaries of Mark Sturgis (Dublin 1999)
- L.O., [C.J.C Street], The Administration of Ireland 1920 (London 1921)
- Leeson, D.M., The Black and Tans: British Police and Auxiliaries in the Irish War of Independence, 1920-1923 (Oxford 2011)
- McBride, L.W., The Greening of Dublin Castle: The Transformation of Bureaucratic and Judicial Personnel in Ireland 1892-1922 (Washington, DC 1991)

- Department For Defence Notice
- Government Transcript About Tuskar Rock/AAIU At Gormanston
- DOD White Paper For Gormanston Closure Discussed
