= Kilnap Viaduct =

Railway viaduct in Cork, Ireland

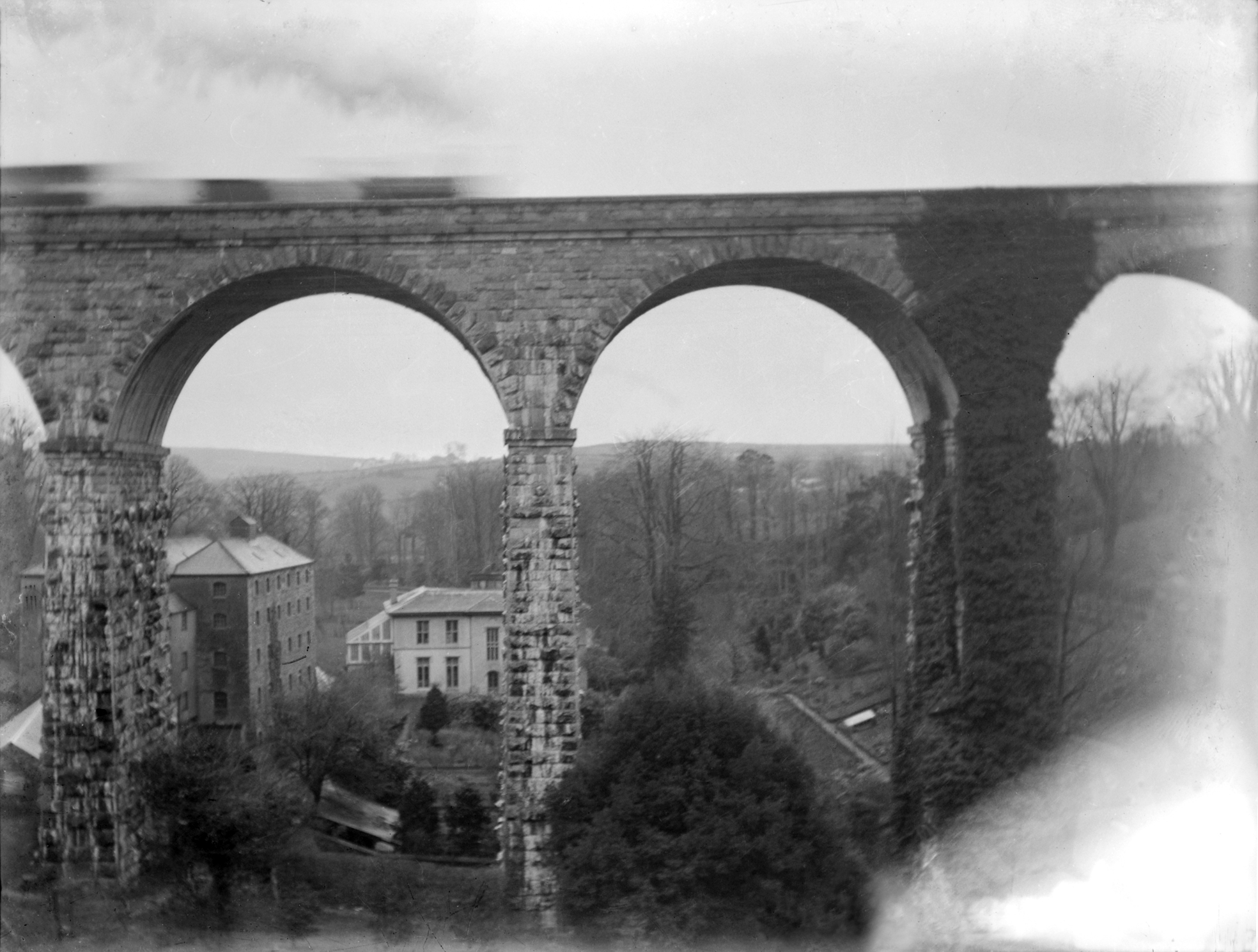
- Kilnap Viaduct c. 1910
- Coordinates: 51.9268°N 8.4875°W
- Carries: Dublin–Cork railway line
- Crosses: Glennamought River
- Locale: Cork, Ireland
- Maintained by: Transport Infrastructure Ireland

Characteristics
- Material: Limestone
- No. of spans: 8

History
- Construction end: 1845
- Opened: 28 September 1848

Location
- Interactive map of Kilnap Viaduct

The Kilnap Viaduct (known colloquially as the Eight-Arch Bridge) is an eight-arch railway viaduct located in Cork, Ireland. Built in 1845, it carried the Great Southern & Western Railway line to Cork over the valley of Glennamought River and Mallow Road, and is still in use today as part of the main Dublin to Cork line. The viaduct is listed as a protected structure by Cork City Council.

== Technical details ==
The eight-arch railway viaduct features rock-faced ashlar limestone piers with a cut stone impost supporting squared coursed limestone spandrels with dressed limestone string course. It has rock-faced limestone voussoirs leading to round-headed arches, ashlar limestone vaults to barrels and a squared coursed limestone parapet with cut stone coping. The viaduct was built by William Dargan.

As built, it was 420 ft long and 90 ft high.

== See also ==
- Cork railway tunnel
