= Balbriggan railway station =

Railway station in Balbriggan, Ireland

Balbriggan Baile Brigín
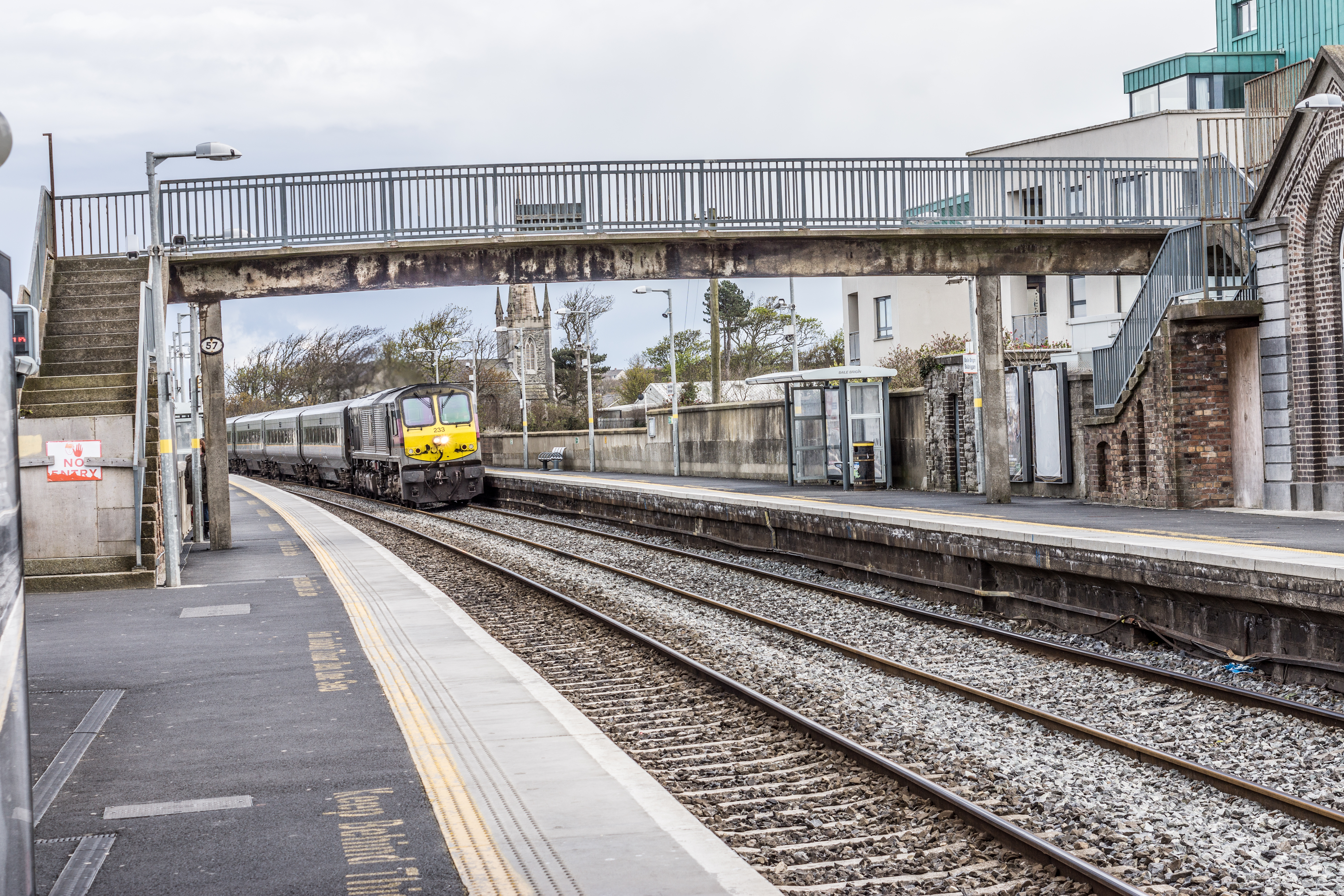

General information
- Location: Railway Street, Balbriggan, County Dublin; Ireland
- Coordinates: 53°36′43″N 6°10′57″W
- Owner: Iarnród Éireann
- Line: Belfast–Dublin line
- Platforms: 2
- Tracks: 2
- Bus operators: Balbriggan Express; Bus Eireann; TFI Local Link
- Connections: 191; 192; 195; B1

Construction
- Structure type: At-grade

Other information
- Station code: BBRGN
- Fare zone: Suburban 5

History
- Opened: 1844

Services
Preceding station	Iarnród Éireann	Following station
Skerries towards Dublin Connolly or Grand Canal Dock	Commuter Northern Commuter	Gormanston or Drogheda MacBride towards Dundalk Clarke
Future services
Preceding station	Future services	Following station
Skerries	DART; Line 2 (phase 2)	Gormanston
Route map
Location
- Location within Ireland

Balbriggan railway station (Irish: Stáisiún Bhaile Brigín) serves Balbriggan in County Dublin.

The station is located on the Dublin to Belfast railway line. It is the northern limit of Dublin's Short Hop Zone, meaning it is the last station Leap cards are valid at. Due to a growing population, planning permission has been submitted to increase the capacity of the station.

== History ==
The station opened on 25 May 1844. It was opened by the Dublin and Drogheda Railway, then run by the Great Northern Railway (Ireland) until 1950. The GNR(I) was then taken over by the Irish and Northern Irish Governments and was run through the Railway Board until 1958. Upon the dissolution of the GNRB those portions of the former GNR(I) within the Irish Republic passed to the Córas Iompair Éireann. The station closed for goods traffic on Monday 2 December 1974.

== Description ==
The station has two lines which run through Balbriggan. A viaduct is to the south of the station and can be viewed by walkways on both sides. The right side of the walkway can be entered via stairs at Balbriggan Beach. The left side can be entered via a path on Quay Street. The station currently has 2 platforms. Platform 2 contains the main entrance via the station building. Inside, there are ticket machines, a ticket office and ticket barriers. Platform 1 has to be entered via a footbridge over the tracks. Each platform has real time information screens. The platforms have loudspeakers for announcements. All Northern Commuter services stop and one train per day terminates/originates at the station. Enterprise and Tara Mines zinc trains pass through the station without stopping.

== See also ==
- List of railway stations in Ireland
