= Bettystown railway station =

Railway station in County Meath, Ireland

Bettystown railway station (Irish: Baile an Bhiataigh) was a railway station in County Meath, Ireland, on the Dublin and Drogheda Railway line, serving the village of Bettystown.

The station was opened on 25 May 1844 and closed on 1 November 1847.

In November 2025, the NTA announced a feasibility study for a new station at Bettystown would be undertaken.
