= John Benjamin Macneill =

Irish civil engineer

Sir John Benjamin Macneill FRS
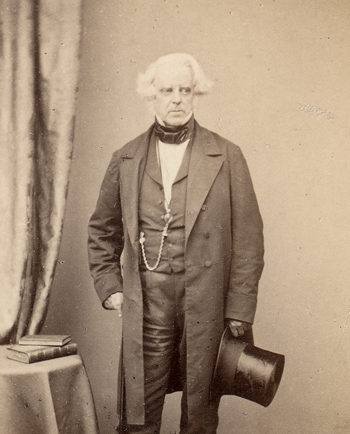
- Born: 1793; Dundalk, Ireland
- Died: 2 March 1880 (aged 86–87)
- Occupation: Civil engineer

Sir John Benjamin Macneill FRS (1793 – 2 March 1880) was an Irish civil engineer of the 19th century, closely associated with Thomas Telford. His most notable projects were railway schemes in Ireland.

== Life ==
He was born in Mountpleasant near the town of Dundalk, County Louth, Ireland.

Macneill started initially as a surveyor and was employed practically in laying out roads and other engineering works since 1816. His survey of the Boyne estuary became the basis of a report by Alexander Nimmo in 1826. During a trip to England in the 1820s he met engineer Thomas Telford who inspired him to become a civil engineer. Indeed, he became Telford's chief assistant for 10 years, eventually succeeding Telford as chief engineer on the massive London–Holyhead road project. He developed Macneill's road indicator in the late 1820s, an instrument for ascertaining the force necessary to draw a carriage over different kinds of roads and pavements, and consequently, the actual condition of the road.

In 1831, Macneill gave evidence to a Parliamentary select committee on the effect of steam carriages on road surfaces.

After Telford's death in 1834 Macneill established his own consultancy, based in London and Glasgow, and turned his attention towards railways—his first projects were freight schemes in the Scottish coal and ironfields near Wishaw and Motherwell. He was also consulting engineer at Grangemouth Docks and for various Scottish canal projects.

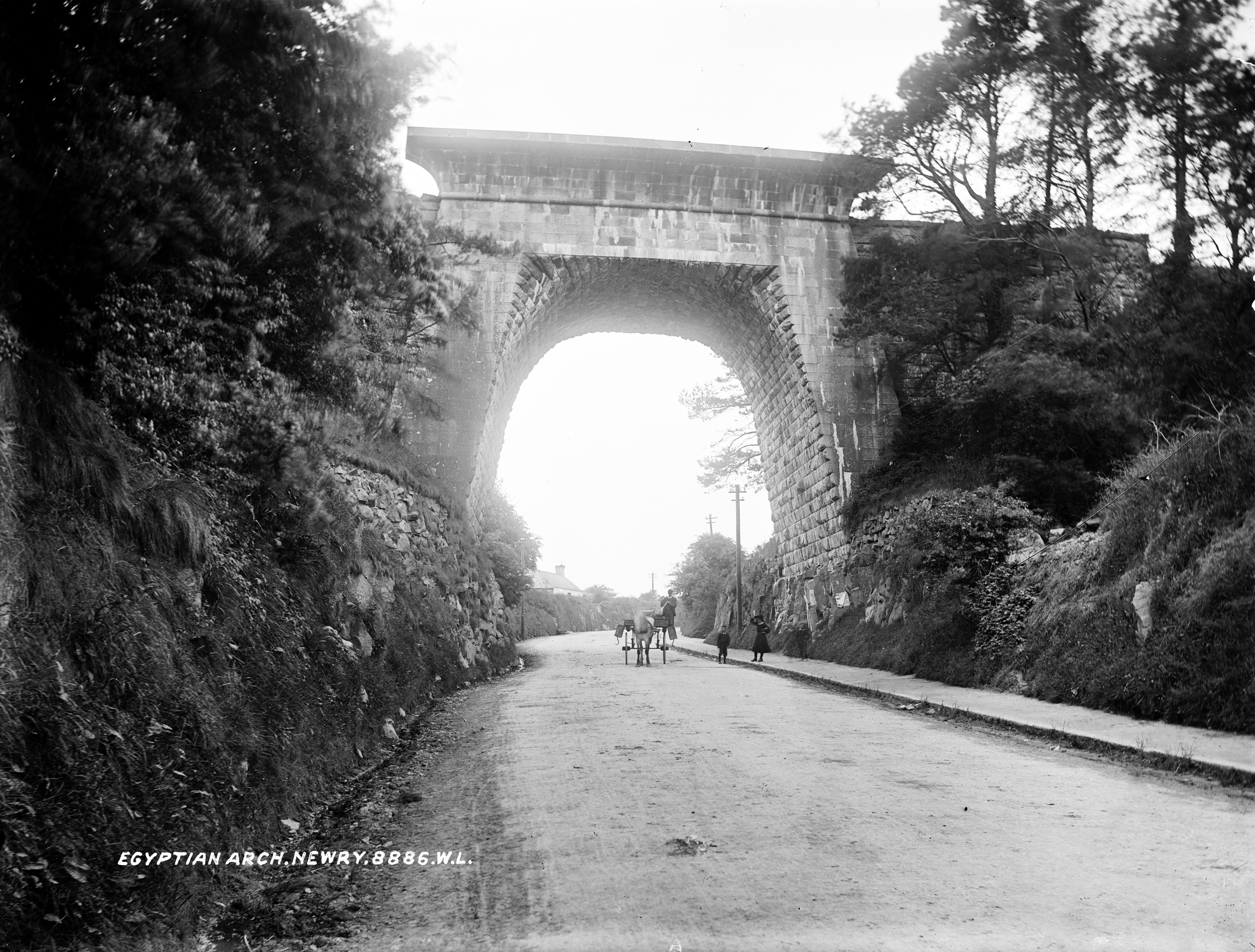
MacNeill's Egyptian Arch, Newry, ca. 1905

During the late 1830s and early 1840s, Macneill focused on his native Ireland. He worked on various railway projects, including the Dublin and Drogheda Railway, including plans to extend the railway beyond Drogheda towards Portadown. Much of Ireland's modern railway network still follows routes he proposed. For example, the Dublin-Belfast railway line follows the line of the Dublin and Drogheda Railway along the coast (Macneill was knighted in 1844 following its completion) and many of its impressive original structures remain such as the 98-foot (30 m) high Boyne Viaduct near Drogheda, built 1851 to 1855, based on ideas developed by William Bindon Blood, the 18-arch, 126-foot (38 m) high Craigmore Viaduct near Bessbrook, built 1849 to 1852, and the nearby Egyptian Arch.

Macneill was also a noted teacher of civil engineering (his pupils included Sir Joseph Bazalgette and G. W. Hemans), and in 1842 he was appointed the first Professor of the Practice of Engineering at Trinity College Dublin, a post he held for 10 years.

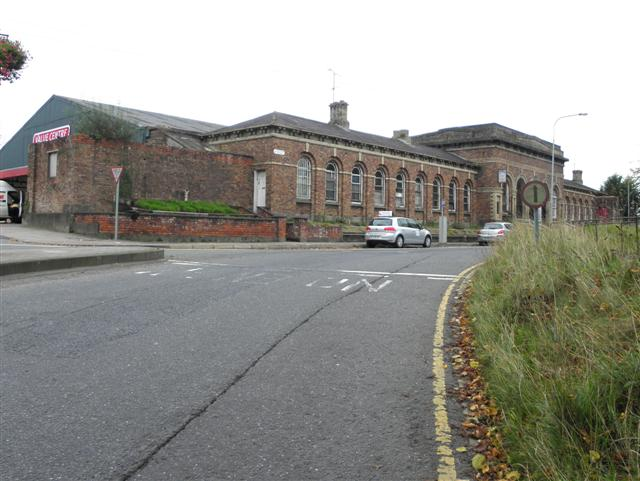
Monaghan railway station

He was involved with harbour improvements in his birthplace town of Dundalk in the early 1850s, but was not averse to the occasional overseas commission. In 1855, he helped survey part of a route for a railway line linking Europe to India, participating in an expedition to the valley of the River Euphrates.

Closer to home, however, as chief engineer of the Belfast and County Down Railway (founded in 1846), he was responsible for crossing the marshy estuary of the River Quoile (the first bridge was constructed of timber piles driven into the riverbed) to bring the line to Downpatrick in March 1859 (part of the line is still operational from the town's railway museum).

Soon after, in April 1860, Macneill was appointed engineer of the Londonderry and Lough Swilly Railway, intended to link Lough Foyle and Lough Swilly across the Inishowen peninsula in north Donegal. It was around this period that the Victorians' enthusiasm for railways began to wane, and the Lough Swilly company was one of many that rarely made a profit. This was disastrous for Macneill as many of his commissions were to be rewarded through share dividends on any profits. He had also unwisely made himself financially liable for calls on shares for unprofitable railway companies.

With his income dwindling, Macneill became utterly impoverished. A fire in 1857 destroyed the principal industrial enterprise on his estate, the linen-mill and factory employing over 300 men, and this had been uninsured. He was then forced in 1868 to sell Mountpleasant House, his home in north Louth, which he had designed and built, and he moved to Surbiton and then London. He later became blind, abandoned by his friends and pupils, reportedly surviving on a pittance earned from making matchboxes in the single room where he lodged. He died at his son Torquil's house in Cromwell Road, south-west London on 2 March 1880. Another son, Telford Macneill, later bought back Mountpleasant House in 1894 and lived there until 1934.

== Legacy ==
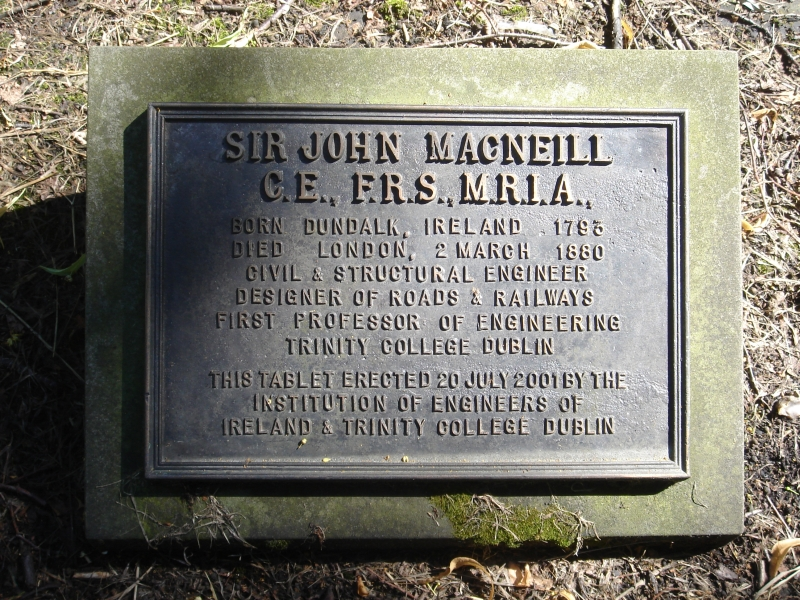
Funerary monument, Brompton Cemetery, London

A commemorative plaque was unveiled on 20 July 2001 at his (previously) unmarked grave in Brompton Cemetery in London. It lies towards the north-east corner of the cemetery.

== Sources ==
- Diarmaid Fleming (2001) "Macneill: remembering engineering's forgotten hero" New Civil Engineer magazine (London, UK), pp. 24–25, 19 July.
