= Clontarf railway station =

Former station in Dublin, Ireland

Clontarf railway station (Irish: Cluain Tarbh) was a railway station in Dublin, Ireland, on the Dublin and Drogheda Railway line.

== Location ==
The remnants of the station can still be seen at the rail bridge over Howth Road, halfway between the start of that road and Killester village centre, approximately one kilometre north of the present Clontarf Road railway station.

The station was opened on 25 May 1844 and finally closed on 3 September 1956.
