= Boyne Viaduct =

Boyne Viaduct Irish: Tarbhealach na Bóinne
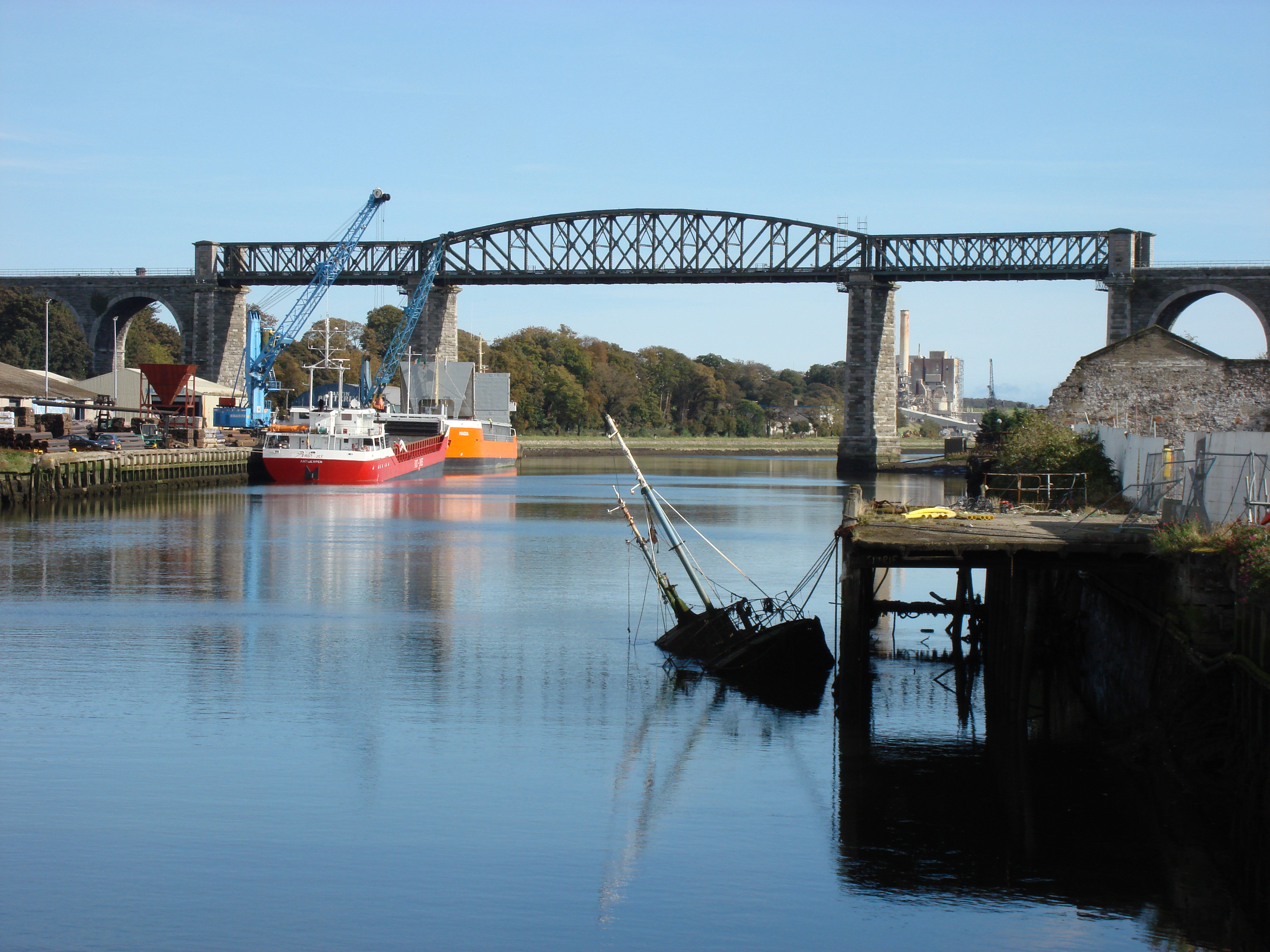
- Coordinates: 53°43′00″N 6°20′15″W
- Carries: Belfast-Dublin railway line
- Crosses: River Boyne
- Locale: Drogheda
- Maintained by: Iarnród Éireann

Characteristics
- Design: Stone arch & Iron truss

History
- Designer: John Benjamin Macneill
- Construction start: 1851
- Construction end: 1855

The Boyne Viaduct (Irish: Tarbhealach na Bóinne), a 30-metre-high (98-foot) railway bridge, or viaduct, that crosses the River Boyne in Drogheda, carrying the main Dublin–Belfast railway line.

== History ==
The viaduct was designed by the Irish civil engineer Sir John Benjamin Macneill using new mathematical stress analysis developed just a few years before by William Bindon Blood at Queen's College, Galway. Construction began on the bridge in 1853 and was completed in 1855. It was the seventh bridge of its kind in the world when built, and considered one of the wonders of the age.

Before its construction, railway passengers had to make their way through the town of Drogheda from the stations on either side of the River Boyne until the construction of a temporary wooden bridge, which allowed trains to cross the river from May 1853 until the completion of the viaduct.

During World War II, the viaduct was identified by the British as being of great strategic importance as part of the British plans for a counter-attack following a German invasion of Ireland.

2005 marked the 150th anniversary of the viaduct, and Iarnród Éireann and the Railway Preservation Society of Ireland ran a special service operated by a steam locomotive between Drogheda railway station and Dundalk.

== Description ==
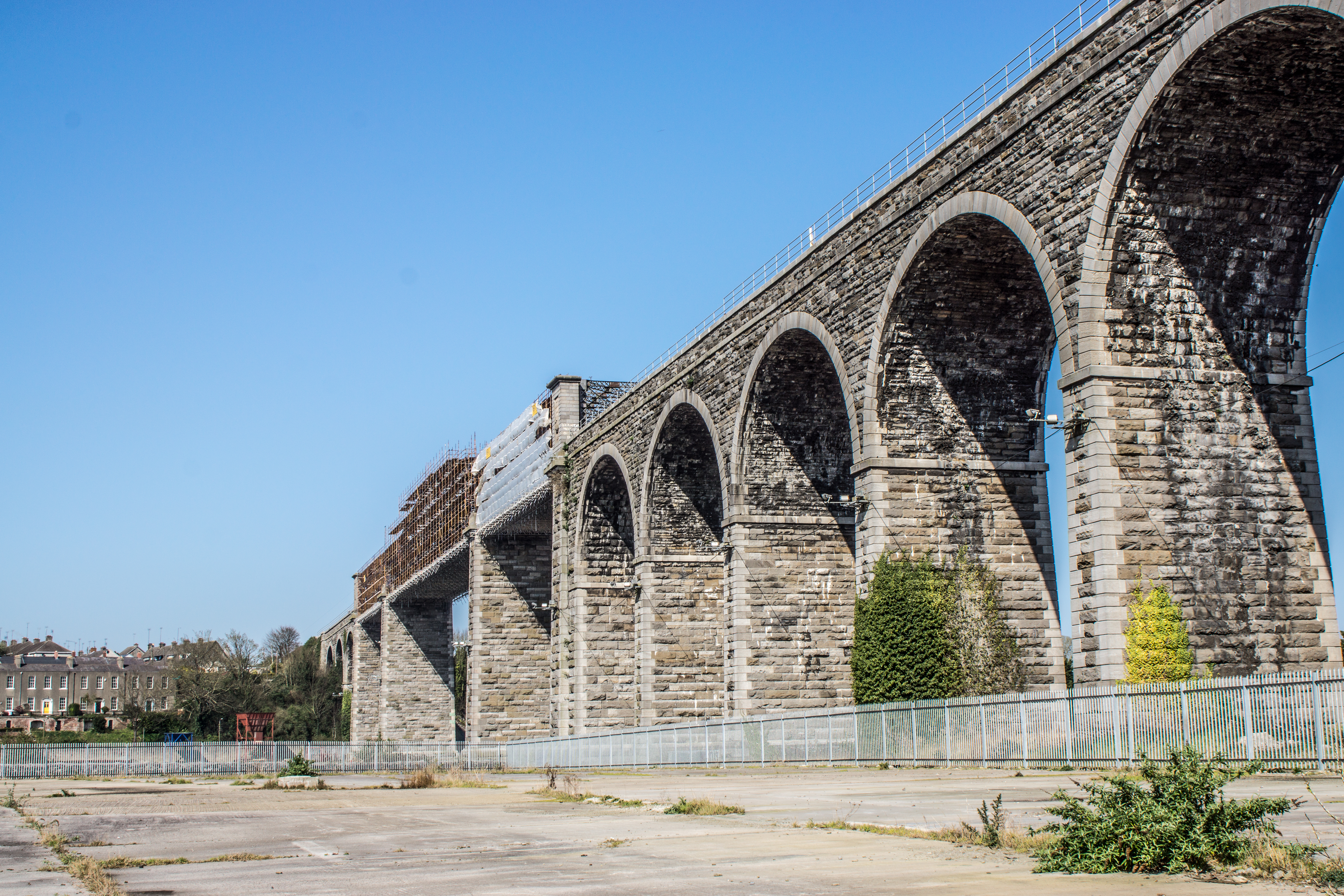
2012

The viaduct comprises twelve stone arches on the south side and a further three on the north. It is located near a tight curve, which necessitates the slowing of trains as they approach. The central Pratt truss bridge was originally made of three iron spans that originally carried two tracks.

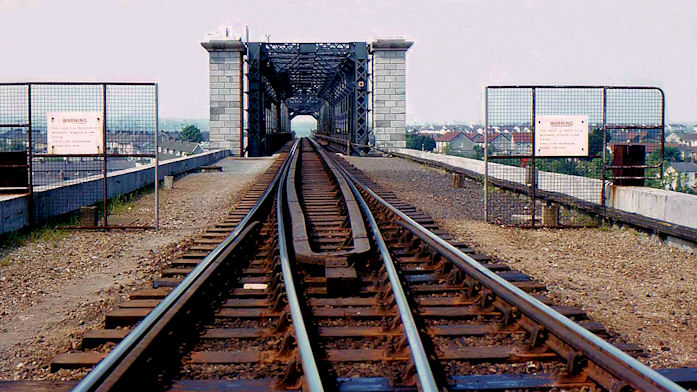
The interlaced tracks

When the bridge was refurbished in the 1930s, new steel girders replacing the ironworks were constructed inside the original bridge before the iron structure was removed. This allowed trains to continue running throughout the renewal process; however, the new bridge was no longer wide enough to carry two tracks. The northbound and southbound tracks were interlaced so that one rail lay between the tracks in the opposite direction, as points and a single track would have required a signal cabin on the north side of the viaduct.

In 1932, the three spans over the river were replaced with the current iron trusses. These were built by the "Motherwell Bridge Engineering Company" with G.B. Howden as the chief engineer.

When the tracks were relaid in the 1990s, singling was introduced, and the interlaced tracks were replaced with a single track over the viaduct and points at each side.

The structure has been listed by the National Inventory of Architectural Heritage as a heritage structure.

== Refurbishment ==
Over €6.1m was awarded for the refurbishment of the Boyne Viaduct financed through the European Union's INTERREG IVA Programme. The project involved several essential refurbishment activities, including steel repairs and full repainting, renewal of work over the viaduct, waterproofing of the deck, and installation of a new drainage system. The project was officially completed on 7 December 2015.
