= Rush and Lusk railway station =

Railway station in County Dublin, Ireland

Rush and Lusk An Ros agus Lusca
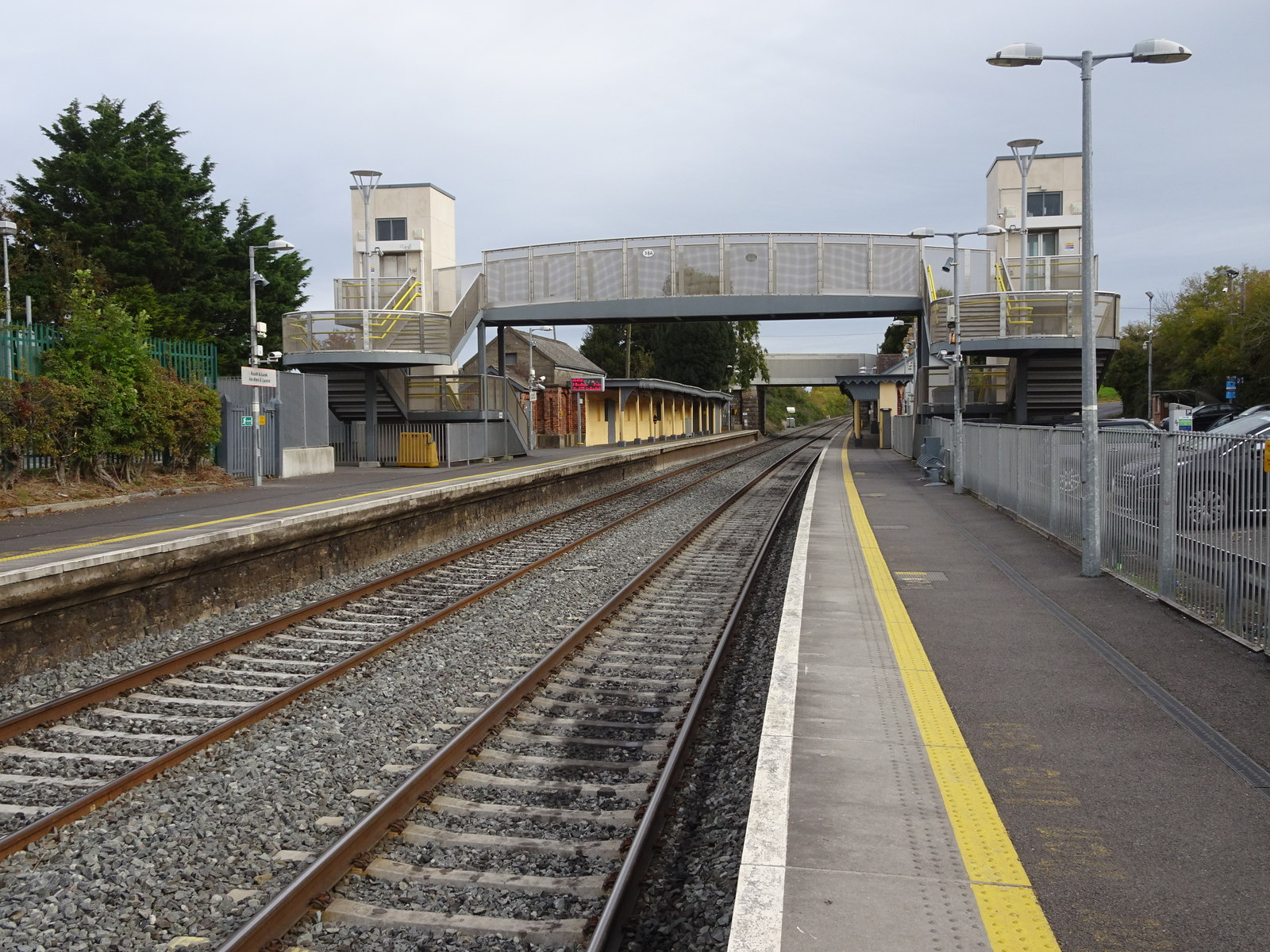
- Rush & Lusk railway station looking North in 2018.

General information
- Location: Station Lane, Lusk, County Dublin, K45 P825; Ireland
- Coordinates: 53°31′12″N 6°08′38″W
- Owner: Iarnród Éireann
- Line: Belfast–Dublin line
- Platforms: 2
- Tracks: 2
- Bus operators: Dublin Bus; Go-Ahead Ireland
- Connections: 33; 33A; 33X

Construction
- Structure type: At-grade

Other information
- Station code: 114
- Fare zone: Suburban 3

History
- Opened: 1844

Services
Preceding station	Iarnród Éireann	Following station
Donabate towards Dublin Connolly or Grand Canal Dock	Commuter Northern Commuter	Skerries towards Dundalk Clarke
Future services
Preceding station	Future services	Following station
Donabate	DART; Line 2	Skerries
Route map
Location

Rush and Lusk railway station (Irish: Stáisiún An Ros agus Lusca) serves the towns of Rush and Lusk in County Dublin, Ireland.

== History ==
The station opened on 25 May 1844. and it later featured in one scene in the biopic, Michael Collins.

The station was the scene of a crash in 1963 of the Enterprise, from which 200 people were able to walk away with only minor injuries. The crash was caused by a faulty tyre on the wheel of the second coach, which broke just north of the station. Although damage to the train and platforms was quite severe it remained upright, and the fact that the crash occurred where it did, and on a Saturday evening when traffic was relatively light, resulted in only walking wounded. The locomotive on the front of the train was undamaged.

The station has two platforms, platform 2 runs north to Drogheda/Dundalk, while platform 1 runs south to Connolly Station/Pearse Street Station in Dublin City Center. The station has yellow lines and is situated on the Dublin - Belfast railway line. It also has a 19th-century design.

== Upgrade works ==
In September 2007 a temporary car park was made available on the West side of the station to cater for the large volume of cars at the station. Before this, a farmer who owned a field to the East of the station allowed cars to park in his field free of charge. He eventually closed this though due to illegal dumping.

In 2010, upgrade work was carried out around the station. A large new car park was installed on the west side of the station. These upgrade works also saw the removal of the original wrought iron bridge over the tracks. It was replaced with a more accessible bridge incorporating lifts on both sides.

In 2015 the road bridge of the R128 over the rail line was removed and replaced with a new bridge with a wider footpath.

== Proposed expansion ==
As part of Project Ireland 2040 the DART is proposed to be extended to Drogheda on the Northern Line serving Donabate, Rush & Lusk, Skerries, Balbriggan and on to Drogheda.

As of August 2025, the Railway Order for this proposed expansion has been approved by An Coimisiún Pleanála, the national planning appeals body in the Republic of Ireland.

== See also ==
- List of railway stations in Ireland
