= Community Games =

The Community Games, known for sponsorship reasons as the Cairn Community Games, is an Irish independent voluntary organisation and national governing body which seeks to provide opportunities for children and young people to participate in a range of sporting and cultural activities. A number of 'National Festivals', undertaken as part of the Community Games, are held over several weekends during the year, usually from May onwards. Children first take part in their area, of which there are over 400, and then progress to county, provincial and ultimately the national finals.

== History ==
The Community Games was set up in 1967 by Joseph Connolly. Initially, the event was focused in the Walkinstown area of Dublin – as a way to deal with the problems of the lack of leisure-time activities for young people of the area. The Dublin Community Games finals took place, in Santry, in 1968 and 1969. The event expanded by 1970, and the finals of the inaugural National Community Games involved teams from counties Cork, Kilkenny, Limerick, Louth, Roscommon, Tipperary and Waterford.

For much of the game's history, from 1973 until 2008, the national finals were held in Mosney, County Meath. However, from 2009 onwards the games were held at the Athlone Institute of Technology in Athlone, County Westmeath and then in the grounds of the University of Limerick. They have since been in several different venues throughout Ireland such as SETU Carlow, Westport Golf Club, Kilkenny Watershed and Visual Carlow.

Previously known as the "HSE Community Games", as of 2018 the organisation was sponsored by Aldi. In early 2024, Cairn Homes was announced as the title sponsor for the Community Games.

== Events ==
Sports, games and activities that are undertaken as part of the Community Games include:

=== Sports ===
- Athletics
- Badminton
- Basketball
- Camogie
- Cycling
- Futsal
- Gaelic football
- Gymnastics
- Hurling
- Pitch and putt
- Rounders
- Rugby
- Skittles
- Indoor soccer
- Swimming
- Table tennis
- Tennis
- Spikeball

Other events

- Art
- Chess
- Choir
- Culture Corner
- Draughts
- Model making
- Quiz
- Handwriting
- Dance
- Singing
- Comedy sketch/Drama
- Music
- Recitation

=== National Festivals ===
Young people from all over Ireland aim to qualify for the Community Games "National Festivals" each year. These take place over several weekends in various locations throughout Ireland.

== Past participants ==
A number of notable Irish athletes and performers have previously participated in the games. These have included:

- Sonia O'Sullivan
- Eamonn Coghlan
- Mark English
- John Treacy
- James Nolan
- Sarah Lavin
- Colin Farrell
- Paul O'Connell
- Ronan O'Gara
- Saoirse Ronan
- Niall Quinn
- Karen Shinkins

== See also ==
- Sport in Ireland
