= Gormanston, County Meath =

Gormanston Irish: Baile Mhic Gormáin
- Village
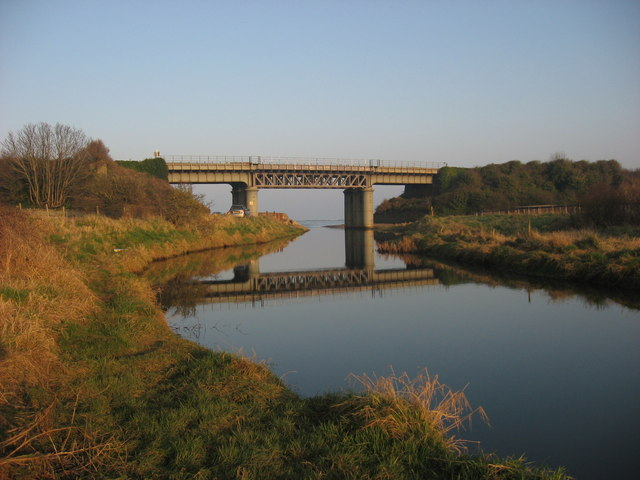
- Railway bridge over River Delvin at Gormanston

- Location in Ireland
- Coordinates: 53°38′13″N 6°14′03″W
- Country: Ireland
- Province: Leinster
- County: County Meath

Population (2016)
  - Total: 375

Gormanston (Irish: Baile Mhic Gormáin) is a village in County Meath, Ireland. It is near the mouth of the River Delvin and the northern border of County Dublin.

== History ==
=== Archaeology ===
A group of passage graves on either side of the mouth of river Delvin, known as the Bremore/Gormanston group, is believed to mark the arrival of that culture from the Iberian peninsula and to be the precursor of later developments such as the Newgrange cluster. Legend also associates the site with the first landings of both Saint Patrick and Oliver Cromwell.

During construction of a gas pipeline between Great Britain and Ireland, a 7-metre (20 foot) long prehistoric dugout was found just offshore at Gormanston Strand. Unlike other ancient Irish boats, the Gormanston boat seems to have been of outrigger construction.

=== Historic features ===
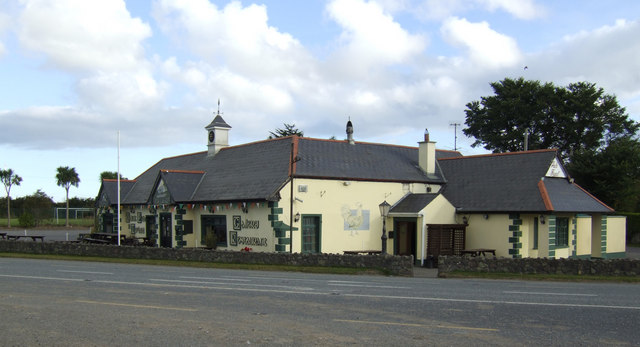
The Cock public house

Several ancient cob cottages still exist in the village under more modern surfaces. Gormanston Bridge dates to the 13th century and is believed to be one of the oldest structures on the Dublin-Dunleer turnpike.

St Brigid's Well in Tobersool is an ancient holy well reputedly associated with a cure for diseases of the eye.

In 1870, the first authentic game of polo in Ireland was played on Gormanston Strand involving the 9th Lancers, who were at the time quartered in the country.

=== Gormanston Castle and the Prestons ===
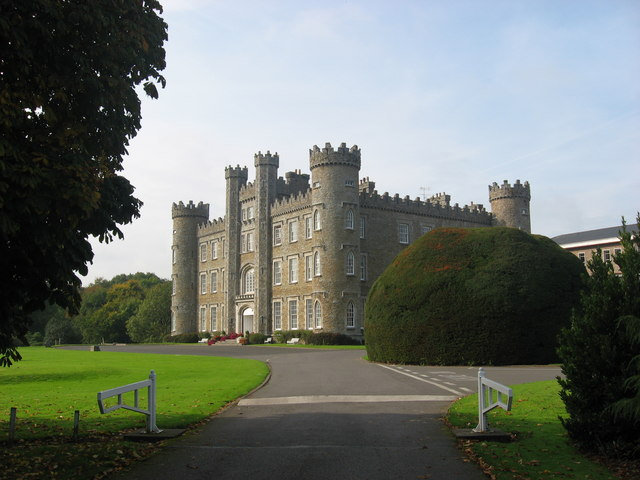
Gormanston Castle

Gormanston Castle was, from the 14th century to the 1950s, the seat of the Preston family, who managed to hold on to their estate lands through the centuries despite being staunch Catholics. The head of the family is known as Viscount Gormanston, premier Viscount of Ireland. The current holder of the title is the 17th Viscount Gormanston, who resides in London. Elizabeth Gorman, painter, lived here.

The family sold the castle in the 1950s, when it was acquired by the Franciscan Order of Friars who then established a boarding school for boys in the grounds, known as Gormanston College. Since 2015, the school has been managed by Meath VEC under Franciscan trusteeship and is now largely a day school although there are still 70 boarders. The sports facilities and vacation accommodation for groups are separately managed by a new company Gormanston Park.

According to The New Ireland Review, April 1908, legend holds that when the head of the family is in his final hours, the foxes of County Meath, except for nursing vixens, emerge from their earths and make their way to the door of Gormanston Castle to keep vigil until he has died, in thanksgiving for the deliverance and protection from marauding predators of a vixen and her young by a previous Lord Gormanston.

== Gormanston Camp ==
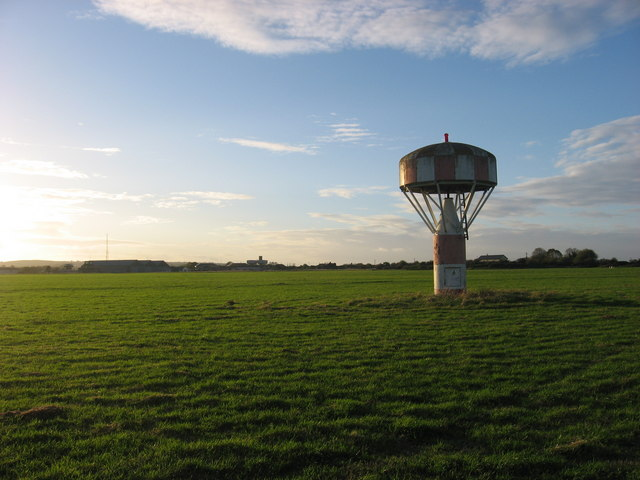
Former aerodrome

Gormanston Camp is currently home to B Company, 27 Infantry Battalion, of the Irish Army, and is a former aerodrome of the Irish Air Corps.

== Transport ==
Gormanston is near the M1 Dublin–Belfast motorway and on the R132 regional road. Gormanston railway station, opened in May 1845, is on the Dublin–Belfast line, and is served by Commuter services between Dublin and Drogheda. The Bus Éireann routes 101 and 101X also serve the area, operating between Drogheda and Dublin.

== Development ==
Gormanston underwent development in the first decade of the 21st century, including the opening of the CityNorth Business Park campus which is a mix of buildings, facilities, a hotel and services.

== See also ==
- List of towns and villages in Ireland
