= Mosney =

Village in County Meath, Ireland

Mosney Maigh Muirí
- Townland
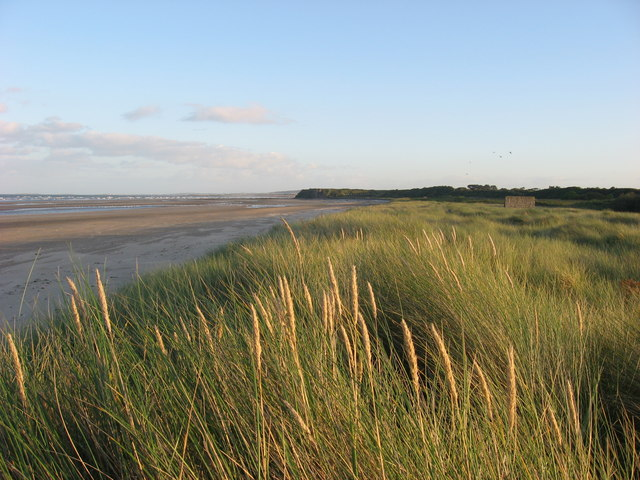
- Strand at Mosney

- Location in Ireland
- Coordinates: 53°39′29″N 6°14′46″W
- Country: Ireland
- Province: Leinster
- County: County Meath
- Time zone: UTC+0 (WET)
  - Summer (DST): UTC-1 (IST (WEST))

Mosney (Irish: Maigh Muirí, meaning 'plain of Mairid') is a townland and village in County Meath, Ireland. It is in the civil parish of Moorechurch 35 km (22 mi) north of Dublin city centre, and 10 km (6 mi) south-east of Drogheda.

It was best known as the site of a Butlin's holiday camp during the second half of the 20th century and as the site for the national finals of the Community Games. By the early 21st century, the holiday camp had been converted into an accommodation centre for asylum-seekers. The village was served by Mosney railway station until 2000.

Early in the 19th century, Mosney was a manor house and part of the estate of the Peppers of Ballygarth Castle. By the mid-20th century, the house was the home of the farm steward of Mosney and was lived in by Johnny Oram whose father had been the previous farm steward.
