= Laytown railway station =

Railway station in County Meath, Ireland

Laytown An Inse
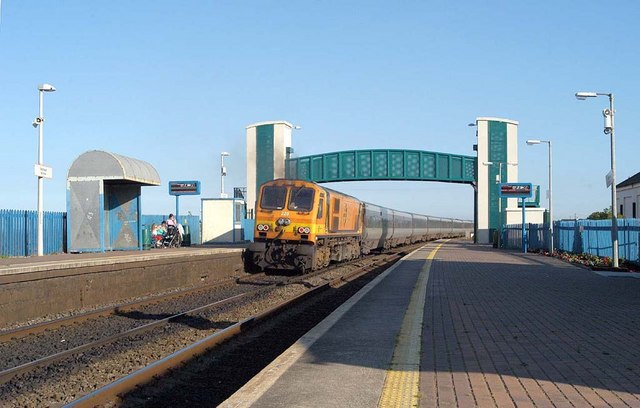

General information
- Location: Laytown, County Meath; Ireland
- Coordinates: 53.6790°N 6.2423°W
- Owner: Iarnród Éireann
- Line: Belfast–Dublin line
- Platforms: 2
- Tracks: 2

Construction
- Structure type: At-grade

Other information
- Station code: LTOWN
- Fare zone: C

History
- Opened: 1844

Services
Preceding station	Iarnród Éireann	Following station
Gormanston towards Dublin Connolly or Grand Canal Dock	Commuter Northern Commuter	Drogheda MacBride towards Dundalk Clarke
Former services
Preceding station	Disused railways	Following station
Mosney; Line open, station closed	Arrow; Northern Arrow	Drogheda MacBride; Line and station open
Future services
Preceding station	Future services	Following station
Gormanston	DART; Line 2 (phase 2)	Drogheda MacBride
Route map
Location

Laytown railway station (Irish: Stáisiún na hInse) serves Laytown and Bettystown in County Meath, Ireland.

It is about 20 minutes' walk from the venue of yearly Laytown races.

== History ==
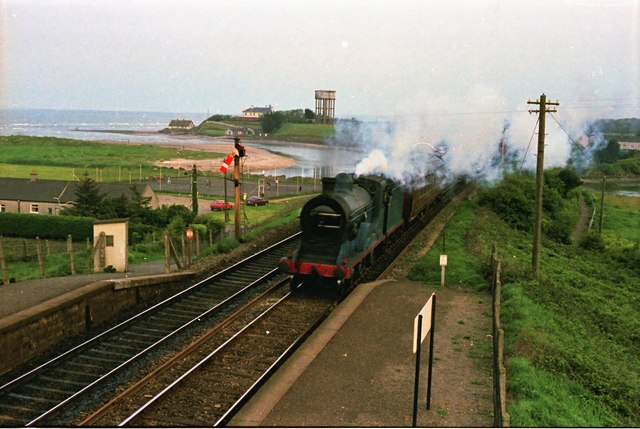
A Great Northern Railway (Ireland) locomotive Slieve Gullion, on a special run by the Railway Preservation Society of Ireland in May 1985, heading through the station.

The station opened on 25 May 1844 and was renamed by the Great Northern Railway as Laytown & Bettystown in 1913. It was since renamed back to Laytown.

== See also ==
- List of railway stations in Ireland
