= William Bindon Blood =

Irish civil engineer

William Bindon Blood (20 January 1817 – 31 January 1894) was an Irish civil engineer.

== Life ==
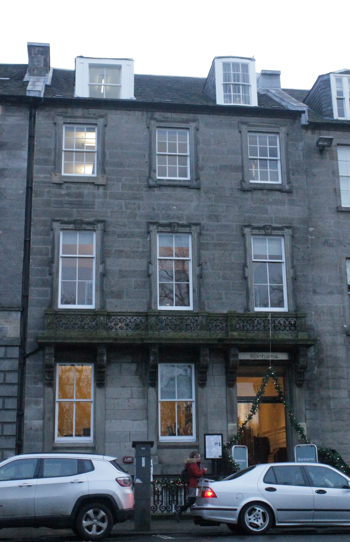
22 Queen Street, Edinburgh

He was born on the family estate in Cranagher, near Ennis in County Clare, to Bindon Blood (1775–1855) and his second wife Harriet Bagot (1780–1835).

His father moved to 22 Queen Street in central Edinburgh in 1829.

Bindon Blood went to secondary school in Edinburgh before returning to Ireland and earning a BA (and Gold Medal) in mathematics at Trinity College Dublin (TCD) in 1838. That degree had been introduced in 1835, and engineering wasn't introduced at TCD until a few years later.

His career was spent as an engineer, first on railways in the south of Scotland starting in 1840. Later, he was employed by Isambard Kingdom Brunel as a civil engineer during the construction of the Great Western Railway in England, ending the decade as resident engineer on the Birmingham & Oxford Railway Company.

From 1850 to 1860 he was the professor of civil engineering at Queen's College Galway, taking over from Thomas Drane, the inaugural professor who had only remained in the job for a few months. There he carried out innovative mathematical analyses of stresses in continuous girders with multiple beams, supported by scale models which confirmed his theories. This work was credited in the design of the Boyne Viaduct in Drogheda, whose central span alone was 269 feet long, the longest in the world when this railway bridge was completed in 1855 Queen's University, Ireland awarded him DSc (honoris causa) in 1882.

W. Bindon Blood was also a landlord and a Justice of the Peace. He died of acute bronchitis, at Cranagher, in 1894, having survived three assassination attempts a few years earlier.

== Family ==
In 1841 in Hobkirk, Scotland, he married Margaret Stewart (1820–1849), daughter of Robert Stewart of Hawthornside, Roxburgh. They had 4 children, the oldest being Sir Bindon Blood, who had a long and distinguished career in the British Army. Following Margaret's early death in 1849, and his return to Ireland and taking up of the Queen's College Galway professorship in 1850, W. Bindon Blood remarried, in 1855, this time in Dublin to Maria Augusta Persse (1830–1860), daughter of Robert Henry Persse and Katharine Isabella Seymour. The couple had 2 children, Maria also dying by age 30.

He was a pioneer in the early days of cycling, and patented a popular lightweight 'Dublin tricycle' in 1876.
