= Donabate railway station =

Station in County Dublin, Ireland

Donabate Domhnach Bat
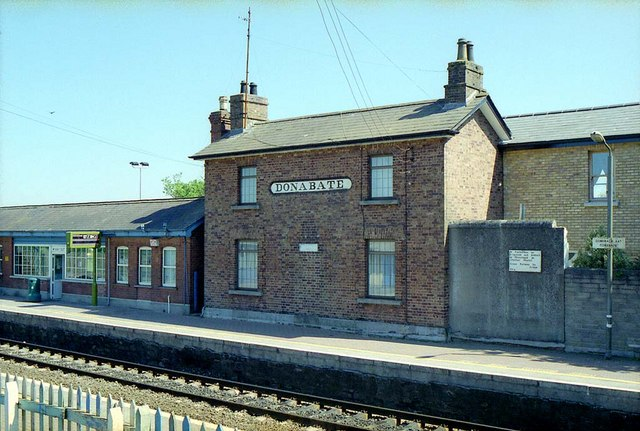
- The historic station building at Donabate, built in 1844

General information
- Location: Turvey Road, Donabate; County Dublin; Ireland
- Coordinates: 53°29′08″N 6°09′05″W
- Owner: Iarnród Éireann
- Line: Belfast–Dublin line
- Platforms: 2
- Tracks: 2
- Bus operators: Dublin Bus
- Connections: 33D; 33E; 33N

Construction
- Structure type: At-grade
- Parking: 24hr paid parking, 210 spaces
- Cycle facilities: Bicycle parking and lockers

Other information
- Station code: DBATE
- Fare zone: Suburban 3

History
- Opened: 1844

Services
| Preceding station | Iarnród Éireann | Following station |
|---|---|---|
| Malahide towards Dublin Connolly or Grand Canal Dock | Commuter Northern Commuter | Rush & Lusk towards Dundalk Clarke |
Route map
Location

Donabate railway station (Irish: Stáisiún Dhomhnach Bat) serves Donabate in Fingal. It is part of the Irish Rail network and is not yet served by DART services. The nearest DART station right now is the previous station, Malahide.

== Description ==
The station has two platforms, one for each of the two lines which run through the station. Built in the mid-19th century, the station has a traditional appearance. The booking office has a small waiting area. There are two ticket-issuing machines and one part-time staffed window for the purchase of tickets. The station is located in the centre of the town.

When the station was opened there was no footbridge built. When CIÉ closed Midleton station in Cork, the GS&WR iron footbridge was moved to Donabate. This footbridge was subsequently removed in 2011 and replaced by a new bridge with steps and lifts for increased accessibility. In 2013, a new building was built on the platform containing ticket barriers. Whilst Midleton has since been reopened.

Donabate is served by 22000 and 29000 Class diesel railcars. However 201 Class locomotives + DeDietrich rolling stock pass through on Enterprise services as do 071 Class locomotives + Tara Mines Wagons with mineral ore trains from Boliden Tara Mines near Navan.

The line speed in Donabate is 90 mph, the highest on the Dublin-Belfast railway line and the highest permittable speed of the DeDietrich coaches.

The station has two lifts and a footbridge connecting Platforms 1 and 2.

In 2015, Irish Rail closed the toilets at the station as part of a cost-cutting measure.

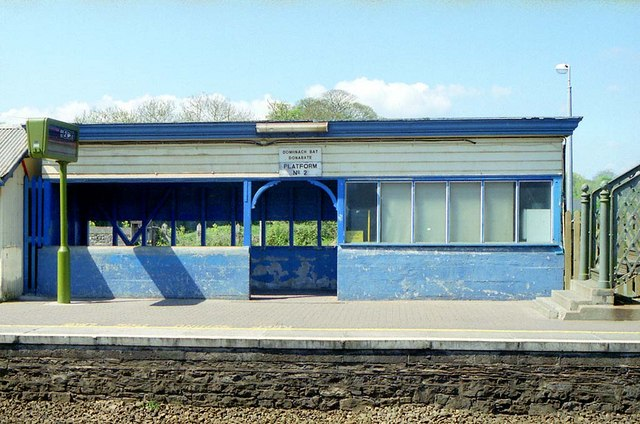
The platform 2 waiting area

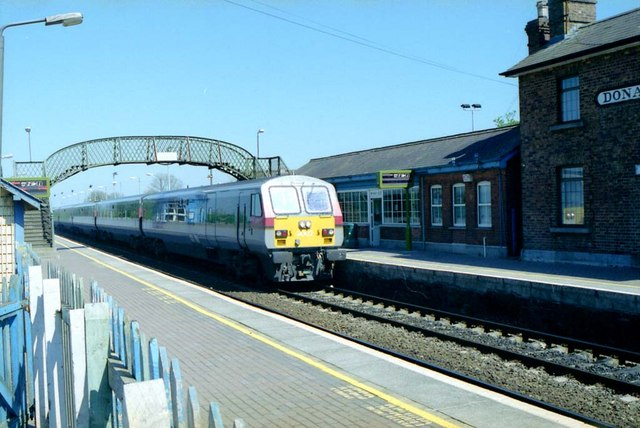
An Enterprise train passing Donabate. This train is going at 90 mph

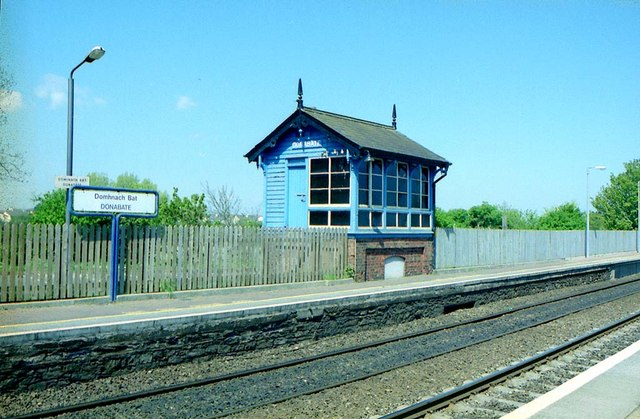
The signal cabin at Donabate. Like the station house, this is also historical

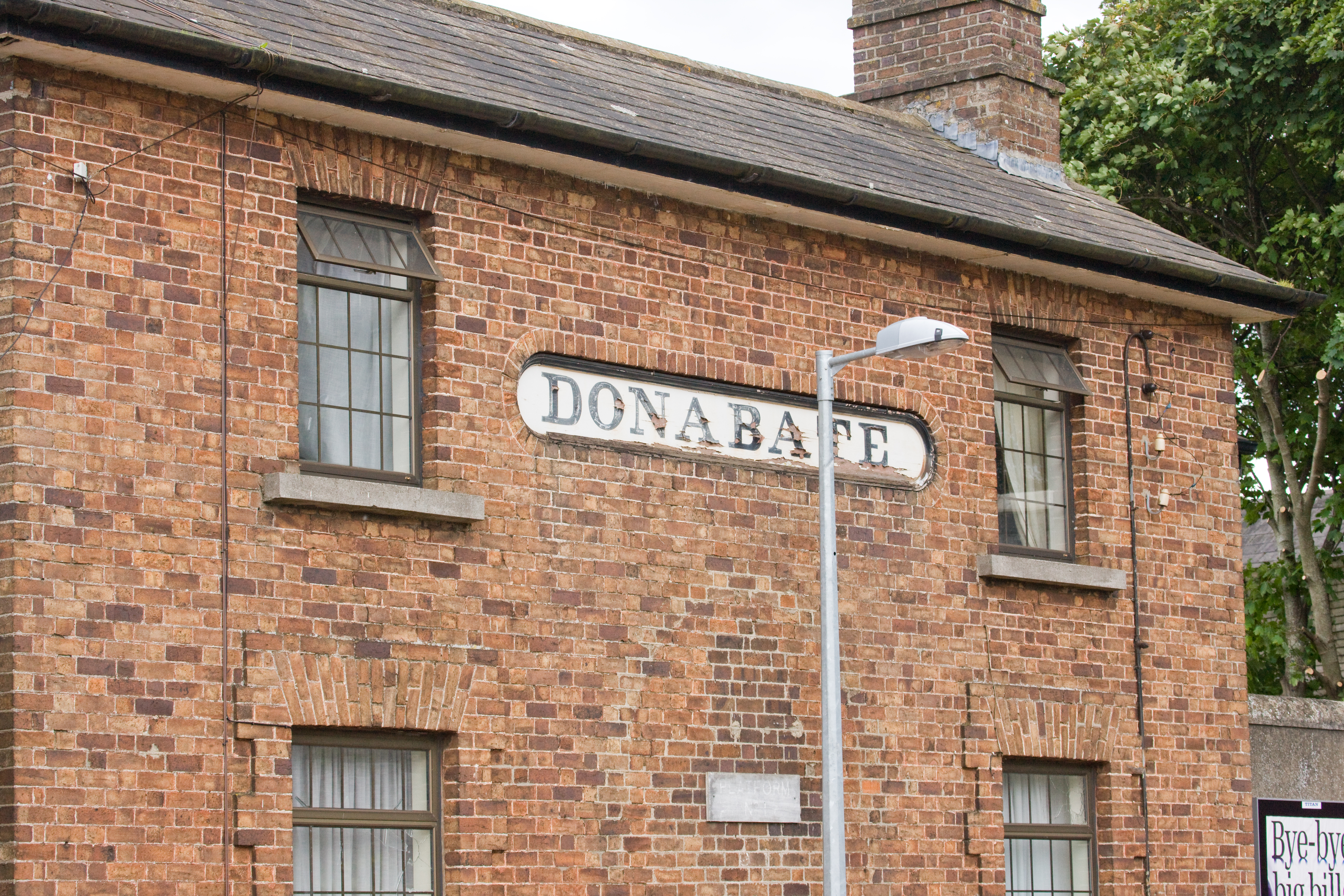
A close up of the historical train station house depicting the sign "Donabate"

== Future proposals ==
Under Transport 21, there were plans to continue the DART from Malahide railway station, through Donabate railway station and up to Drogheda railway station by 2015. However, this was delayed due to the Great Recession and was shelved in 2015.

== See also ==
- List of railway stations in Ireland
