= Gormanston railway station =

Railway station in County Meath, Ireland

Gormanston Baile Mhic Gormáin
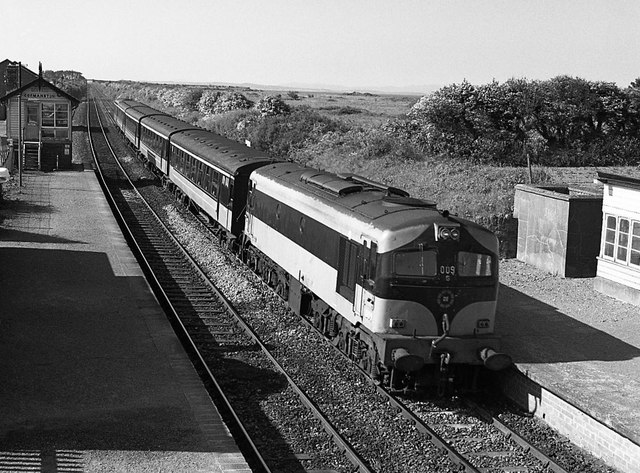
- Train in Gormanston station (1988)

General information
- Location: Station Road, Gormanston; County Meath; Ireland
- Coordinates: 53.6372°N 6.2168°W
- Owner: Iarnród Éireann
- Line: Belfast–Dublin line
- Platforms: 2
- Tracks: 2
- Bus operators: Bus Éireann
- Connections: 101; 101X

Construction
- Structure type: At-grade

Other information
- Station code: GSTON
- Fare zone: B

History
- Opened: 1845

Services
Preceding station	Iarnród Éireann	Following station
Balbriggan towards Dublin Connolly or Grand Canal Dock	Commuter Northern Commuter	Laytown towards Dundalk Clarke
Former services
Preceding station	Disused railways	Following station
Balbriggan; Line and station open	Arrow; Northern Arrow	Mosney; Line open, station closed
Future services
Preceding station	Future services	Following station
Balbriggan	DART; Line 2 (phase 2)	Laytown
Route map
Location

Gormanston railway station (Irish: Stáisiún Baile Mhic Gormáin) (often mistakenly written Gormanstown) serves Gormanston, County Meath, Ireland. It is located between Balbriggan and Laytown, north of a cast-iron bridge on which the line crosses the River Delvin.

== History ==
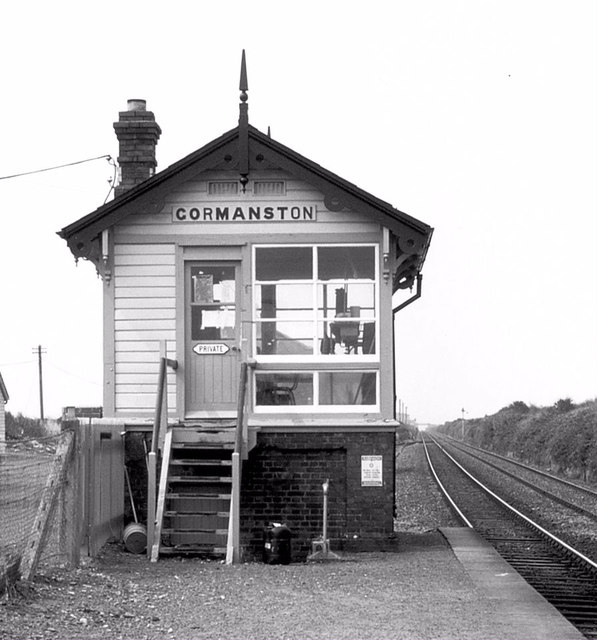
Signal box (1982), now moved to Dromod

The station opened in May 1845 as part of the Dublin and Drogheda Railway. In 1876 it was taken over by the Great Northern Railway (Ireland).

It was the scene of a shooting during the Irish Civil War. On Monday 29 May 1922, Staff Captain James Flanagan (Anti-Treaty IRA) was shot by members of the Royal Irish Constabulary. A Royal Irish Constabulary officer was also killed.

== Buildings and facilities ==
The station has a single-storey wooden station building on the up platform which was partially demolished to make way for a car park. A GNR style waiting room is located on the up platform. At the north end of the down platform was a signal cabin. This was moved to Dromod, County Leitrim, and is preserved there. A brick goods shed and the adjacent single storey station masters house stand the north end of the station.

== Accidents and incidents ==
- On Monday 21 October 1974, a three-train collision at Gormanston killed two people and injured 29.

== See also ==
- List of railway stations in Ireland
