= Howth Junction & Donaghmede railway station =

Station in Dublin, Ireland

Howth Junction & Donaghmede Gabhal Bhinn Éadair & Domhnach Míde
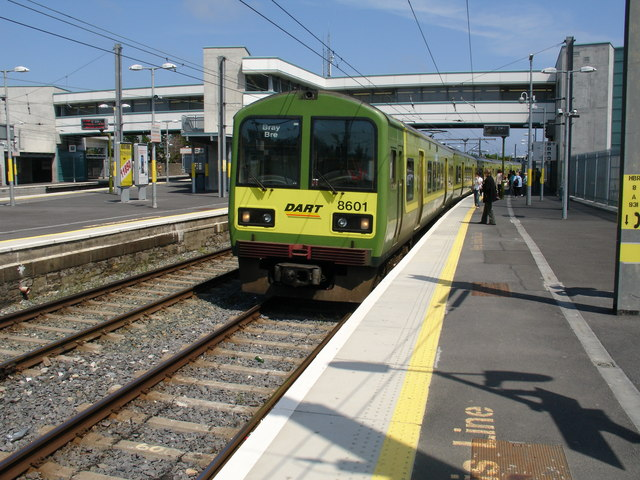
- DART train arriving at Howth Junction in 2007

General information
- Location: St Donagh's Road, Donaghmede and Kilbarrack Way, Kilbarrack; Ireland
- Coordinates: 53°23′29″N 6°09′21″W
- Owner: Iarnród Éireann
- Line: Belfast–Dublin line
- Platforms: 4
- Tracks: 4
- Bus operators: Dublin Bus; Go-Ahead Ireland
- Connections: 27A; N6

Construction
- Structure type: At-grade
- Cycle facilities: Yes

Other information
- Station code: HWTHJ
- Fare zone: Suburban 1

History
- Opened: 1 October 1848
- Original company: Dublin and Drogheda Railway
- Pre-grouping: Northern Railway of Ireland
- Post-grouping: GNRI
Services
Preceding station	Iarnród Éireann	Following station
Dublin Connolly towards Dublin Connolly or Grand Canal Dock	Commuter Northern Commuter	Clongriffin or Portmarnock towards Dundalk Clarke
Kilbarrack towards Greystones	DART (Main Line)	Clongriffin towards Malahide
Kilbarrack towards Greystones	DART (Howth Branch)	Bayside towards Howth
Route map
Location

Howth Junction & Donaghmede railway station (Irish: Stáisiún Ghabhal Bhinn Éadair agus Dhomhnach Míde) (also known as Howth Junction on automated Irish Rail station announcements and Howth Junction Donaghmede on onboard train announcements) serves the area of Donaghmede, and parts of Kilbarrack in Dublin, Ireland. One entrance is located in Donaghmede, the other in Kilbarrack, and it is where the line to Howth branches off the Belfast–Dublin line, making it the key exchange station on the northern section of the DART suburban railway system.

== History ==
Howth Junction station opened on 1 October 1848.

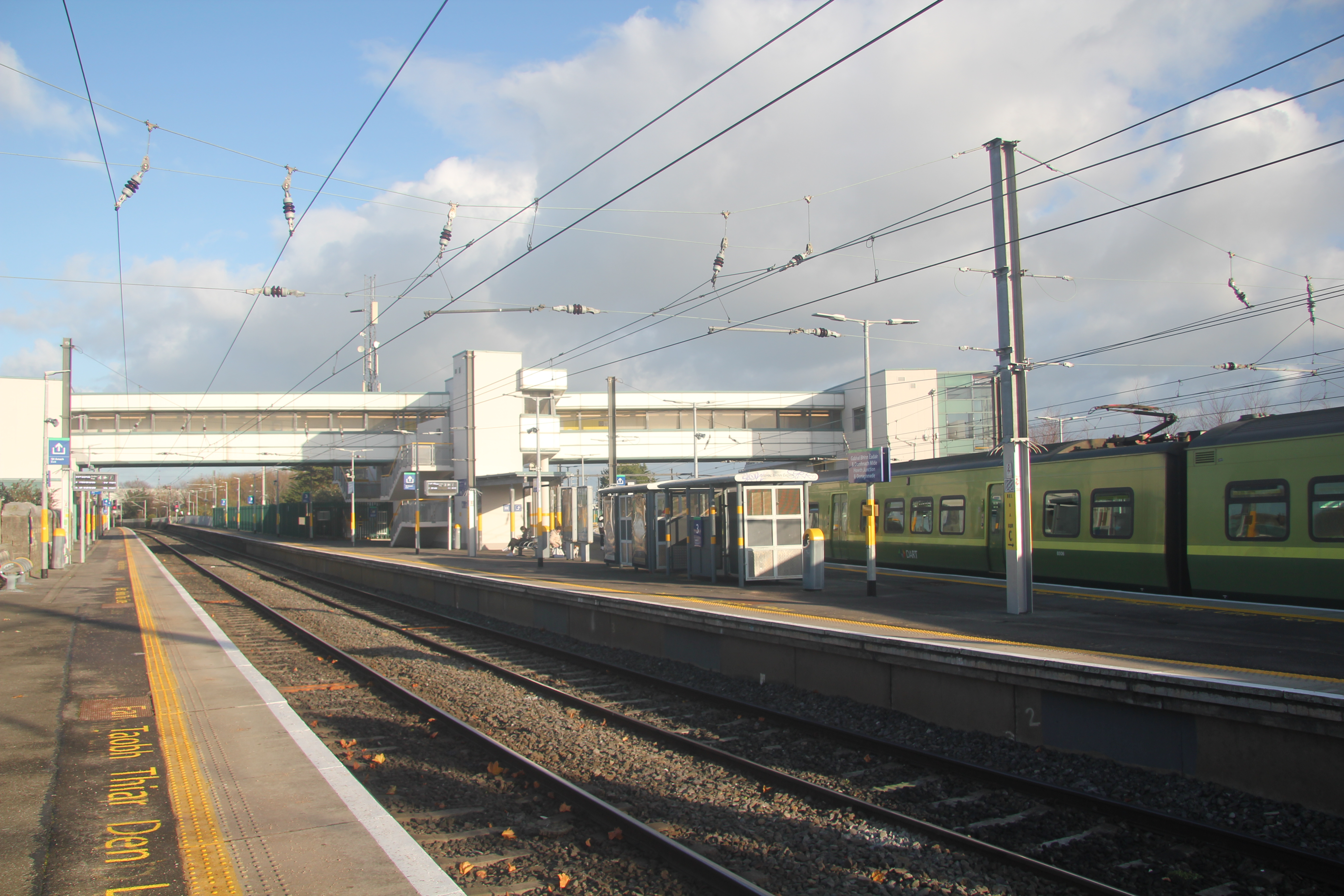
The main building on top of the platforms

=== 2021 assault ===
A woman was knocked onto a rail track at the station around 9pm on 1 April 2021. CCTV of the incident circulated on social media. It showed teens standing on the platform. When one woman ran by, two teens attempted to shove her, one of them moving his bike into her path. A second woman with a bag ran by, the bike was shoved in her direction and she fell under the DART. Onlookers tried to help her and a security guard helped her as onlookers urged the driver not to move off in case she was injured. Youths were seen on CCTV moving away from the incident. Gardaí are treating it as an assault.

On 13 May 2021 Gardaí announced they had arrested three teenagers, two aged 16 and one aged 13. Gardaí announced that they had started a search of five locations pursuant to section 10 of the Criminal Justice (Miscellaneous Provisions) Act, 1997. The teens were arrested under suspicion of violent disorder under the Public Order Act 1994. All three were detained under Section 4 of the Criminal Justice Act 1984. They were held at Garda stations in Coolock, Raheny and Clontarf.

== Operations ==
The ticket office is open from 5:45 AM to 8:00 PM, Monday to Sunday.

== In popular culture ==
The station is mentioned in Damien Dempsey's song "Factories".

== See also ==
- List of railway stations in Ireland
