= Clongriffin railway station =

Station in Dublin, Ireland

Clongriffin Cluain Ghrifín
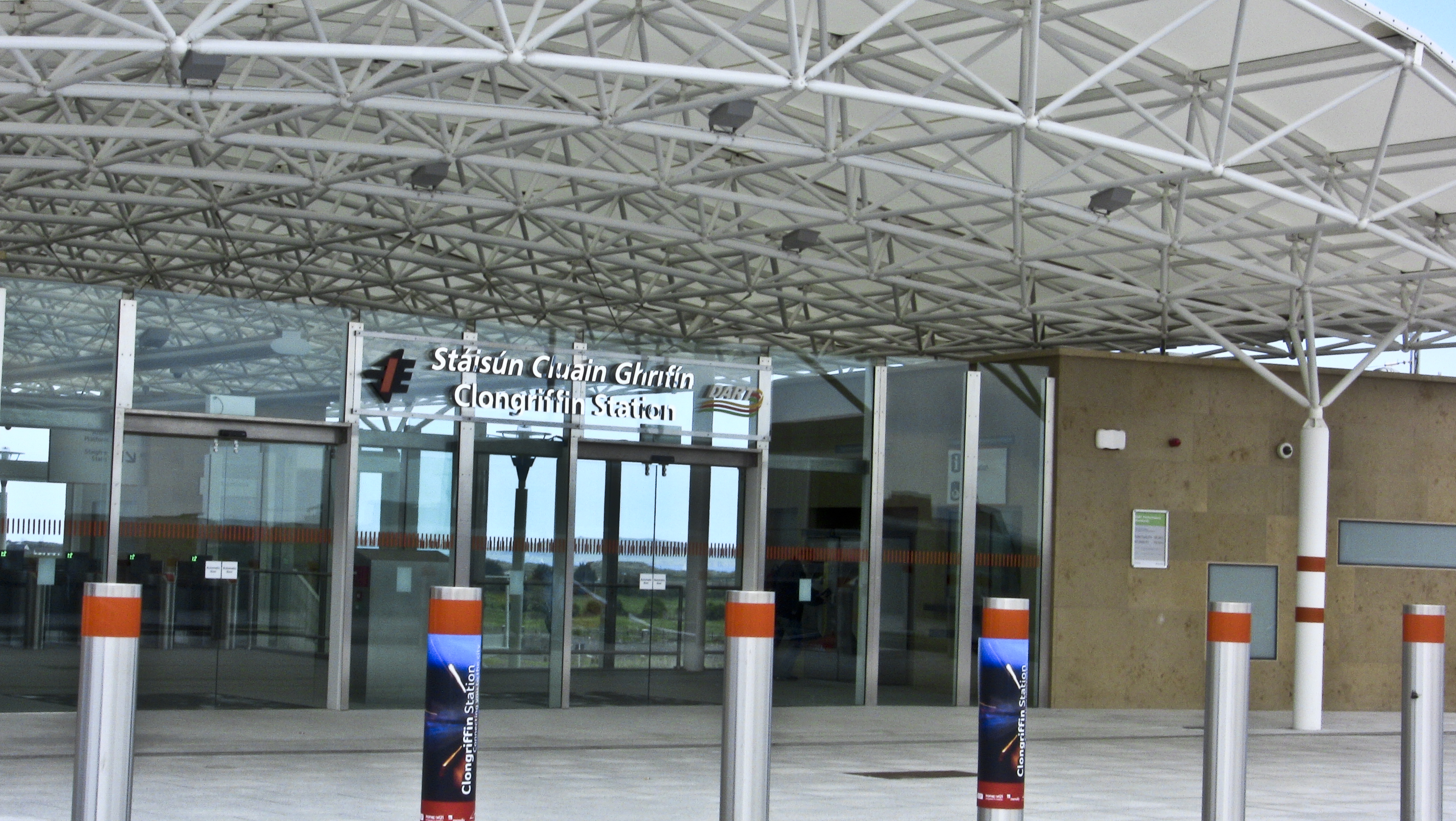

General information
- Location: Station Way, Clongriffin; Dublin; Ireland
- Coordinates: 53°24′10″N 6°08′56″W
- Owner: Iarnród Éireann
- Platforms: 3
- Tracks: 3
- Bus operators: Dublin Bus
- Connections: 15

Construction
- Structure type: At-grade

Other information
- Station code: GRGRD
- Fare zone: Suburban 2

History
- Opened: 19 April 2010

Services
Preceding station	Iarnród Éireann	Following station
Howth Junction towards Dublin Connolly or Grand Canal Dock	Commuter Northern Commuter	Portmarnock towards Dundalk Clarke
Howth Junction towards Greystones	DART (Main Line)	Portmarnock towards Malahide
Location

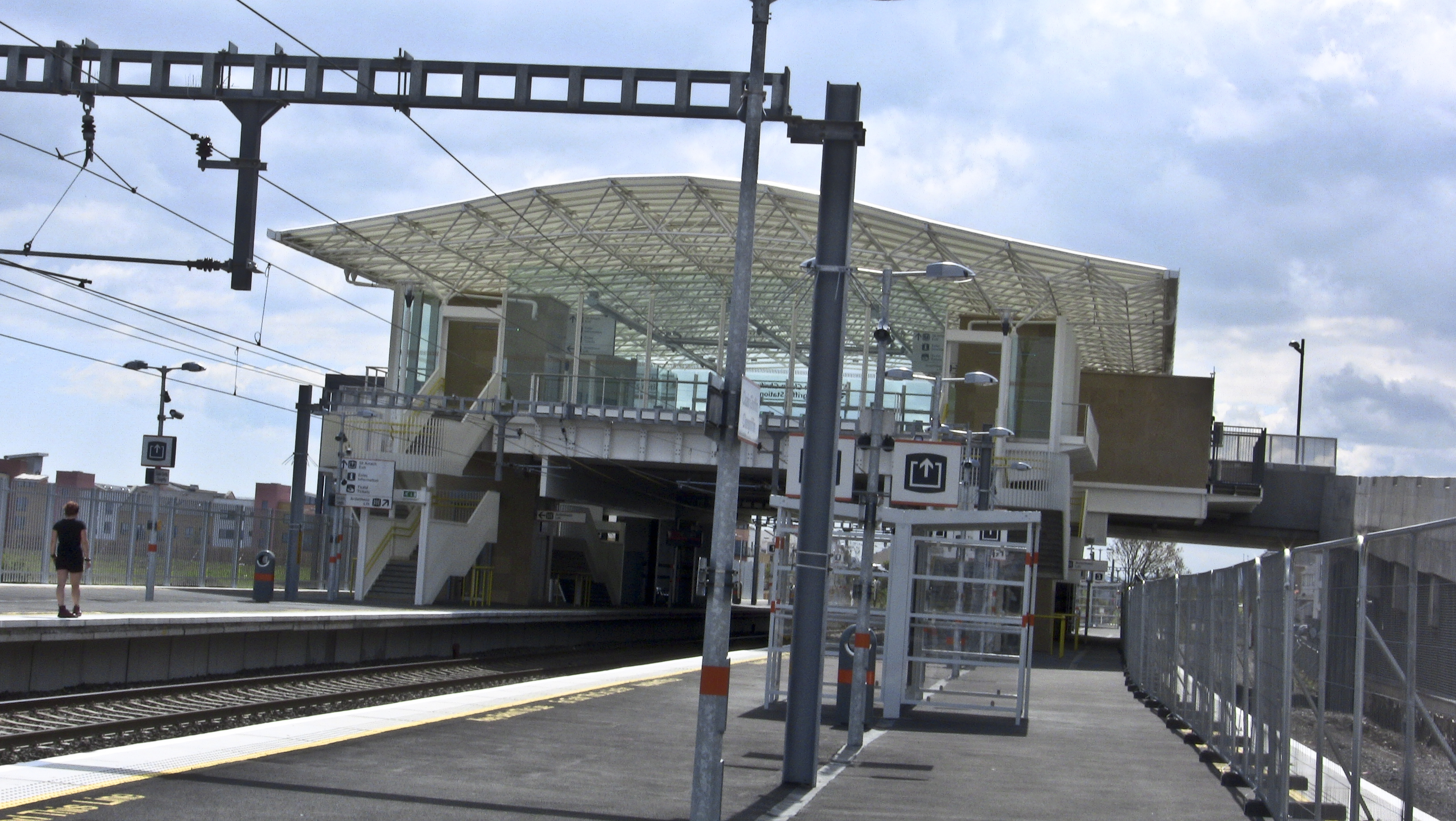
Platform 1 and 2. Behind the fence on the right is the now in use Platform 3.

Clongriffin railway station (Irish: Stáisiún Chluain Ghrifín) is a station at the western edge of Clongriffin on the northern section of the (DART), also accessible from Myrtle Avenue in Baldoyle and also serving other parts of northern Donaghmede, and Balgriffin.

== Location ==
Clongriffin railway station is situated along the Dublin–Belfast railway line between Portmarnock railway station and Howth Junction.

== History ==
The railway station was created as a part of the Northern Fringe Development plan and has been in operation since 19 April 2010.

== Facilities ==
There are three active platforms in Clongriffin DART Station.

A line splits off south of the station to provide access to a third platform, merging back just to the north. The information office is closed and the station remains permanently unstaffed. There is an underground park-and-ride car park with 400 spaces, open from 6 AM to 9 PM which is free of charge at present and bicycle parking. The northern terminus of the number 15 Dublin Bus route is also adjacent to the station which runs to Ballycullen in the south of the city via the city centre, while there are plans to extend the H1 bus route to the station in the future.

== Proposed Dublin Airport Link ==
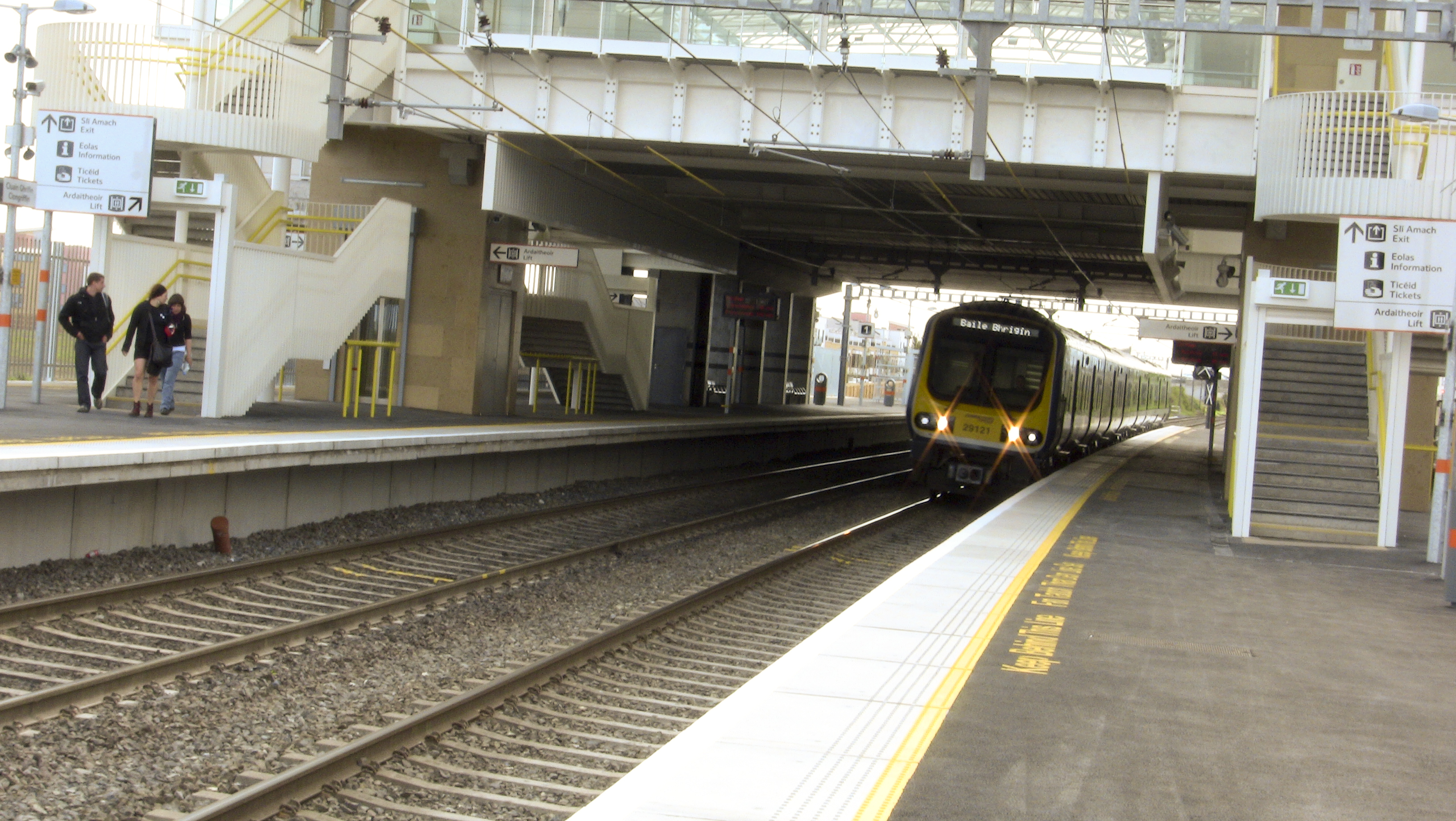
Commuter 29000 Class Passing Clongriffin

In 2011, it was suggested by Iarnród Éireann that Clongriffin station become a new junction station on the proposed Dublin Airport railway line extension. In the 'Rail Vision 2030' strategic network review document this proposed line extension was recommended as a long-term goal; the new line would carry DART commuter services.

As part of BusConnects, there are also plans to introduce the N8 bus route, that would link the airport and Blanchardstown SC to Clongriffin railway station.

== See also ==
- List of railway stations in Ireland
