= Malahide =

Suburban settlement north of Dublin, Ireland

Malahide Mullach Íde (Irish)
- Suburb (village core)
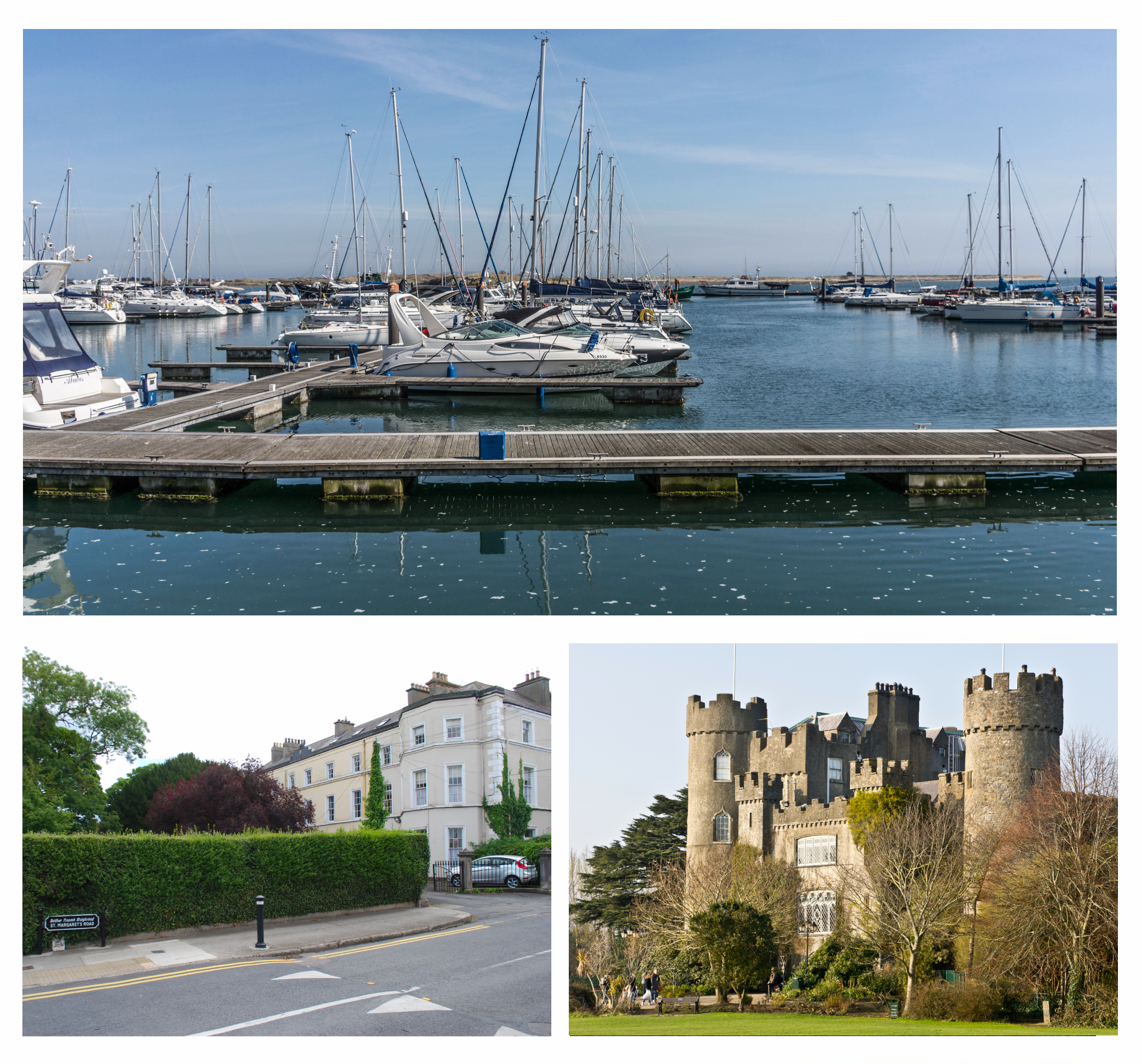
- Clockwise from top: Malahide marina; Malahide Castle; period terraced houses in central Malahide

- Location in Dublin
- Coordinates: 53.4508°N 6.1544°W
- Country: Ireland
- Province: Leinster
- County: Dublin
- Administrative County: Fingal
- Dáil Éireann: Dublin Fingal East
- European Parliament: Dublin
- Elevation: 3 m (9.8 ft)

Population (2022)
  - Urban: 18,608
- Time zone: UTC±0 (WET)
  - Summer (DST): UTC+1 (IST)
- Eircode routing key: K36
- Telephone area code: +353(0)1

Malahide (/ˈmæləhaɪd/ MAL-ə-hyde; Irish: Mullach Íde, meaning 'possibly "the [sand]hill of Íde"') is an affluent coastal settlement in Fingal, County Dublin, Ireland, situated 14 kilometres (9 miles) north of Dublin city. It has a village centre surrounded by suburban housing estates, with a population of 18,608 as per the 2022 census.

Malahide Castle dates from the 12th century and is surrounded by a large park, part of which incorporates an international cricket ground. The area also features a sandy beach, a marina, a parkrun and a number of sporting clubs.

== Etymology ==
The modern name Malahide comes from "Mullach Íde", possibly meaning "the hill of Íde" or "Íde's sand-hill"; it could also mean "Sand-hills of the Hydes" (from Mullac h-Íde), in turn probably referring to a Norman family from the Donabate area. According to the Placenames Database of Ireland the name Malahide is possibly derived from the Irish "Baile Átha Thíd" meaning "the town of the ford of Thíd", which may have been a ford at the mouth of the Gaybrook Stream, on the road to Swords. Malahide Bay was anciently called Inber Domnann, the "river-mouth of the Fir Domnann".

== Location ==
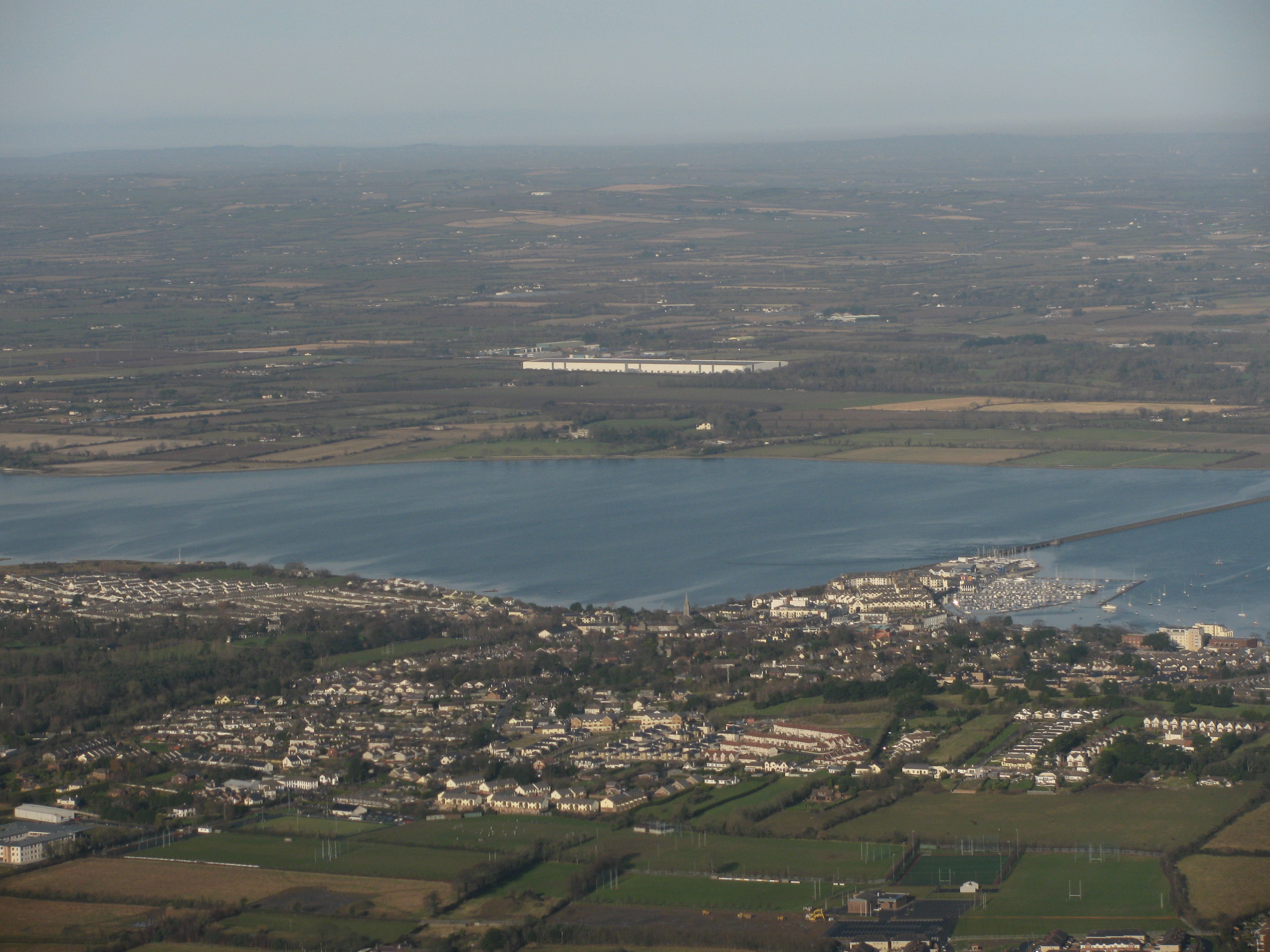
An aerial view of Malahide

Malahide is situated 14 kilometres (9 miles) north of the city of Dublin, lying between Swords, Kinsealy and Portmarnock. It is situated on the southern shore of an estuary where the Broadmeadow River comes to the sea; on the opposite side of the estuary is Kilcrea, and, some way inland, Donabate. To the west of the village, the Gay Brook or Gaybrook Stream passes through Yellow Walls, once a small separate village, to reach the estuary in a marshy area.

The village is served by the DART and some mainline rail services, run by Irish Rail. The Dublin Bus 32, 42 and 102, the 32X and 142 peak hour express services, and the 42N Nite-Link route serve the town from Dublin City Centre. Route 102 serves local areas to/from Dublin Airport (via Swords) and Sutton Station (via Portmarnock).

Malahide is close to the M1 motorway and served via the R132 and R106 regional roads.

== History ==
Historical population
Year	Pop.	±%
1831	294	—
1841	661	+124.8%
1851	596	−9.8%
1861	710	+19.1%
1871	653	−8.0%
1881	670	+2.6%
1891	574	−14.3%
1901	649	+13.1%
1911	685	+5.5%
1926	1,066	+55.6%
1936	1,259	+18.1%
1946	1,540	+22.3%
1951	2,030	+31.8%
1956	2,490	+22.7%
1961	2,534	+1.8%
1966	2,967	+17.1%
1971	3,834	+29.2%
1981	9,158	+138.9%
1986	9,940	+8.5%
1991	12,088	+21.6%
1996	13,539	+12.0%
2002	13,826	+2.1%
2006	14,937	+8.0%
2011	15,846	+6.1%
2016	16,550	+4.4%
2022	18,608	+12.4%

While there are some remnants of prehistoric activity, Malahide is known to have become a persistent settlement from 795, following the Viking invasions of Ireland. The Vikings used Broadmeadow Estuary (along with Baldoyle Bay, where they had a longphort) as a convenient base. With the arrival of the Anglo-Normans, the last Danish King of Dublin retired to the area in 1170.

Malahide Castle, which dominates the area, was constructed after Henry II granted an extensive area of land north of Dublin to Sir Richard Talbot in 1176. The castle evolved from this, and remained in the hands of the Talbot family until 1976, aside from a short period where it was seized by Oliver Cromwell.

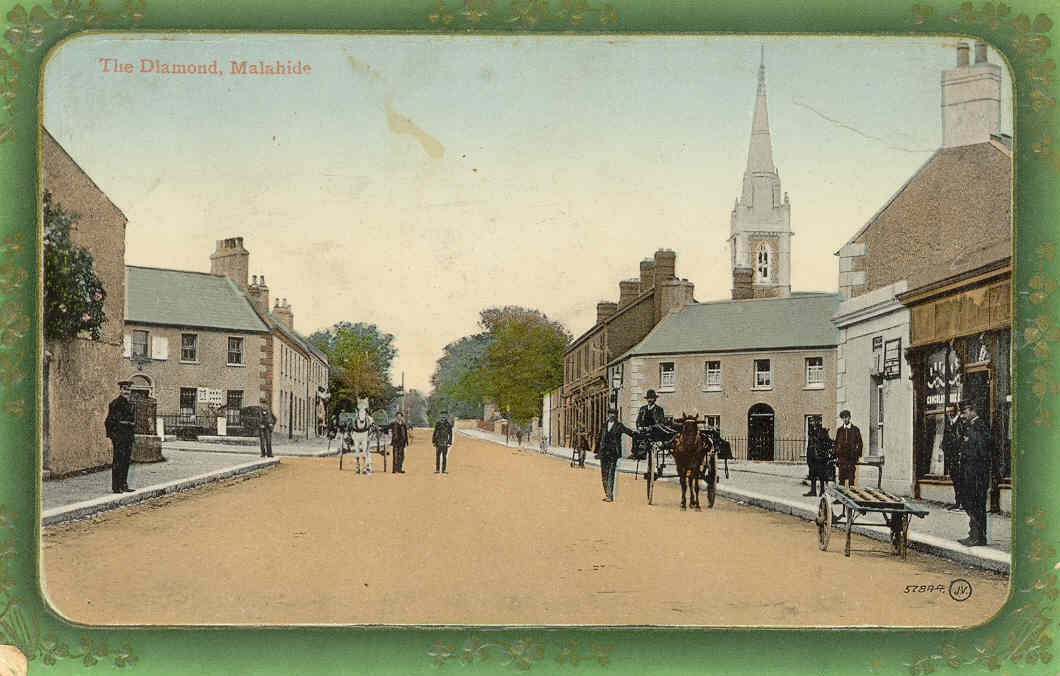
The Diamond, Malahide – early 20th Century

There is an ancient covered well, St. Sylvester's, on the old main street (Old Street, previously Chapel Street), which used to have a "pattern" (a patronal festival) to Our Lady each 15 August.

In 1475 Thomas Talbot, head of the Talbot family of Malahide Castle, was granted the title Admiral of the port of Malahide by King Edward IV, with power to hold admiralty courts and levy customs duties on all merchandise coming into the port. The office was hereditary, and the family's right to act as Admiral was confirmed by the Court of Exchequer (Ireland) in 1639.

By the early 19th century, the village had a population of over 1000, and a number of local industries, including salt harvesting, while the harbour continued in commercial operation, with landings of coal and construction materials. By 1831, the population had reached 1223. The area grew in popularity in Georgian times as a seaside resort for wealthy Dublin city dwellers. This is still evident today from the fine collection of Georgian houses in the town and along the seafront, and Malahide is still a popular spot for day-trippers, especially in the summer months.

31 March 1926, four members of the McDonnell family and two of their employees, who lived in La Mancha House in Malahide, were poisoned with arsenic and beaten to death; the house was then set on fire. Their gardener Henry McCabe was controversially convicted of their murders and hanged.

In the 1960s, developers began to build housing estates around the village core of Malahide, launching the first, Ard na Mara, in 1964. Further estates followed, to the northwest, south and west, but the village core remained intact, with the addition of a "marina apartment complex" development, adjacent to the coastal village green.

There are a number of shops and service outlets in the village core, including a small shopping centre, a supermarket, fashion boutiques, hair and beauty salons, florists, art galleries, book shops, food outlets, and a service station. There are multiple pubs, cafés and restaurants, and there is also the historic Grand Hotel. Malahide has the highest median household income of any large census town in Ireland, according to the Central Statistics Office (CSO).

== Governance ==
Malahide is part of the three-seat Dáil constituency of Dublin Fingal East.

For elections to Fingal County Council, Malahide forms part of the seven-seat local electoral area of Howth–Malahide.

Malahide is also a civil parish in the ancient barony of Coolock within the traditional County Dublin.

== Leisure and organisations ==
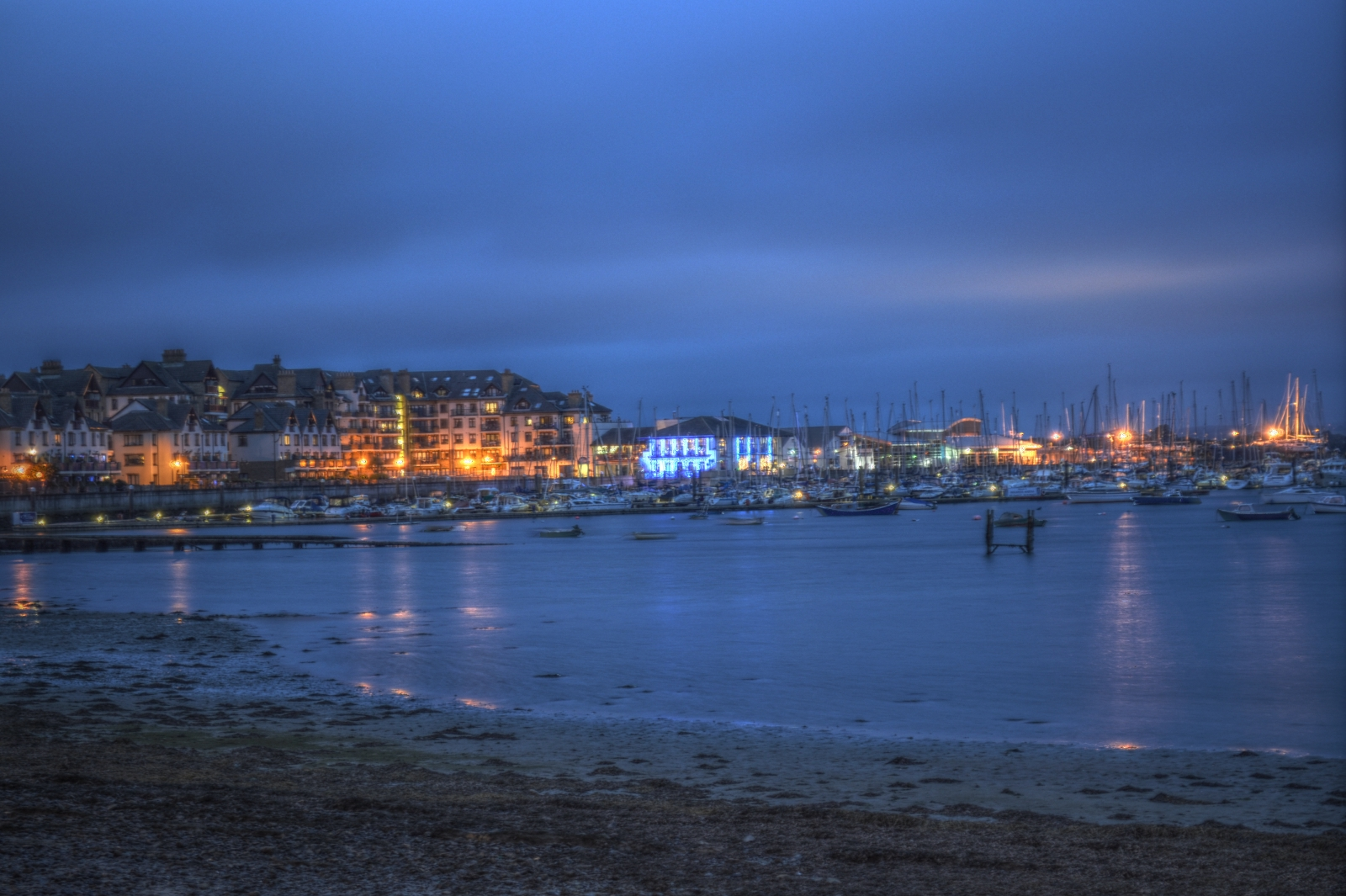
View towards the Marina

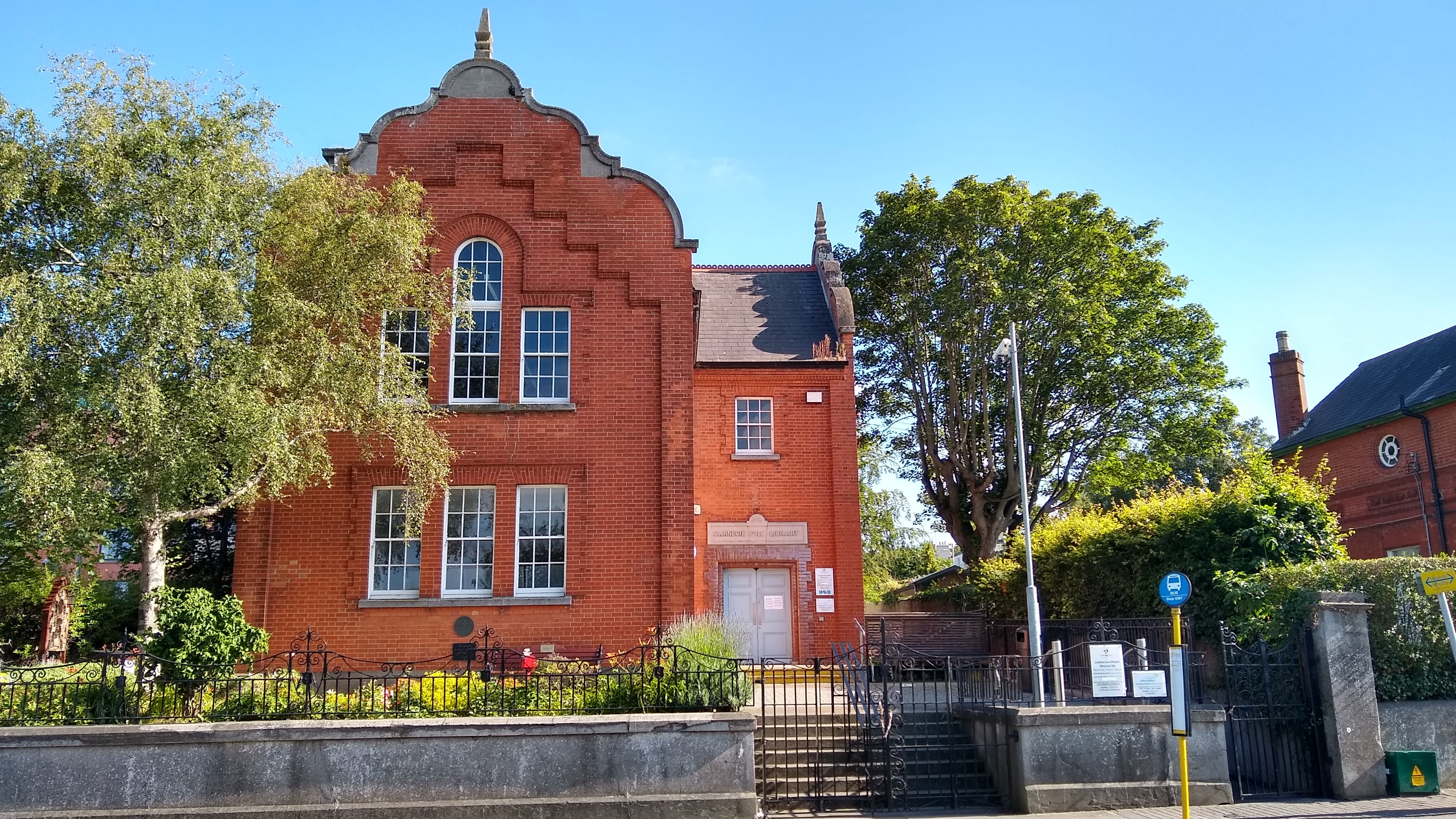
Malahide Library

Near to the village itself is a regional park formed from Malahide Castle and its demesne, including gardens. This was once the estate of the Baron Talbot of Malahide family. Aside from Malahide Castle Demesne, there are a number of smaller parks in the area. There are several golf courses nearby, and GAA, soccer, tennis, rugby, yacht clubs and Sea Scouts. Malahide also has a substantial marina.

The Malahide area has a number of residents' associations, some of which, as of May 2007, worked together through the Malahide Community Forum, which publishes a quarterly newsletter, The Malahide Guardian.

There is a Lions club, a camera club, a musical and drama society, the Enchiriadis choirs, a chess club and a photography group. The Malahide Pipe Band was established in 1954 and still practices in the same area, in Yellow Walls, today.

In 1990, Malahide won the Irish Tidy Towns Competition.

=== Historical society and museum ===
Malahide Historical Society collects materials of local and general historical interest, arranges talks, and operates a museum on the grounds of Malahide Castle. The museum first opened, in 1988, in the cottage at the main vehicular entrance to Malahide Demesne. It moved to the Craft Courtyard in 2007 but closed in 2012, with the collection being stored. It reopened in a new format in some rooms in the Steward's House.

=== Malahide Sea Scouts ===
Malahide Sea Scouts (9th Port of Dublin) was founded in 1919. and has 635 members making it one of the largest Sea Scout groups in Ireland. Malahide Sea Scouts offers a Sea Scouting programme to boys and girls of 6 to 26 years of age from the Scout Den on James's Terrace, and Sea Scouts can undertake sailing, rowing, paddling, swimming and powerboating.

== Sport ==
There are also a number sports clubs within the Malahide area, including rugby, soccer, GAA sports, sailing, hockey, golf, cricket, tennis and basketball clubs.

=== Rugby ===
Malahide Rugby Club is located in a modern clubhouse and sports ground opposite the scenic Malahide estuary on Estuary Road. Founded in 1922, Malahide Rugby Club had to disband during World War II due to a lack of available players. However, in 1978 the club was reformed. It now fields two senior men's teams, one vets team, six youth teams and eight "mini" rugby teams.

=== Soccer ===
Malahide United AFC was founded in 1944 and currently fields 60 schoolboy/girl teams, from Under 7 to Under 18, and 4 senior teams. They have an academy catering for 5-, 6- and 7-year-olds. With over 1,000 registered players, Malahide United is one of the largest clubs in Ireland. The home ground is Gannon Park, which comprises two 11-a-side pitches, one 7-a-side pitch, one 11-a-side floodlit all-weather pitch, one floodlit 5-a-side/warm-up all-weather pitch and full clubhouse facilities. Further pitches are used in Malahide Castle (two 7/9-a-sides and three 11-a-sides) with a further 11-a-side pitch in Broomfield, Malahide.

=== Tennis ===
There are two tennis clubs in the area. The first, Malahide Lawn Tennis & Croquet Club, was founded in 1879 and is one of the oldest tennis clubs in Ireland. The club is situated in the centre of Malahide village, overlooking the outer Broadmeadow estuary. Grove Lawn Tennis Club is a grass court tennis club.

=== Gaelic games ===
St Sylvesters is the local Gaelic Athletic Association club. The club was founded in 1903 and last won the Dublin Men's Senior Football Championship in 1996. The club plays hurling, camogie and men's and women's Gaelic football. In 1996, they became the only Fingal club to win the Dublin Senior Football championship when they defeated Erins Isle in the final.

=== Golf ===
Malahide Golf Club opened in 1892, moving to a new location in 1990. Its clubhouse, completed in May 1990, has bars, a restaurant and a conference room. The club's 17th hole, which is "notoriously difficult", is known locally as "Cromwell's Delight".

=== Sailing ===
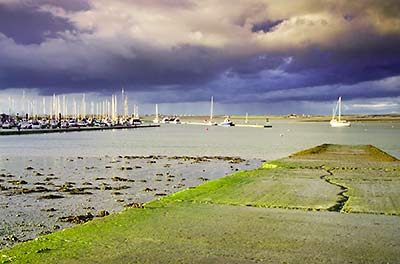
Malahide Harbour

There are two sailing clubs situated on the estuary; Swords Sailing & Boating Club and Malahide Yacht Club. The inner, Broadmeadow estuary has sheltered and non-tidal waters making it suitable for sailing training. While sailing in Malahide has been used for sailing for hundreds of years, Malahide Yacht Club as it is known today was established in the 1950s. Malahide Yacht Club is the only sailing club across Britain and Ireland that operates out of two permanent club house under two distinctive bodies of water. The sheltered 'upper' non-tidal estuary for dinghy performance, and the coastal tidal 'lower' estuary for keelboat activity and cruising.

=== Hockey ===
Malahide Fingal Hockey Club was formed from the amalgamation of Malahide Hockey Club and Fingal Hockey Club (formerly Aer Lingus). An all-female club, they currently field four senior teams and have a junior section of nine teams aged between 7 and 16. All teams for play and train in Broomfield Malahide.

=== Cricket ===
Malahide Cricket Club was founded in 1861 and the ground is situated within Malahide Castle demesne, near the railway station. The ground has hosted Test cricket and One Day Internationals.

=== Basketball ===
Malahide Basketball Club was formed in 1977, and as of 2024, fields 2 senior ladies' teams, 4 senior men's teams and 18 junior girls and boys teams (from under 10 to under 20). They train and play their home matches at Malahide Community School and Holywell Community Centre.

== Education ==
There are five schools in the environs of Malahide, four primaries (Pope John Paul II National School, St. Andrews National School, St. Oliver Plunkett Primary School, and St. Sylvester's Infant School) and one secondary (Pobal Scoil Iosa, Malahide).

== Religion ==
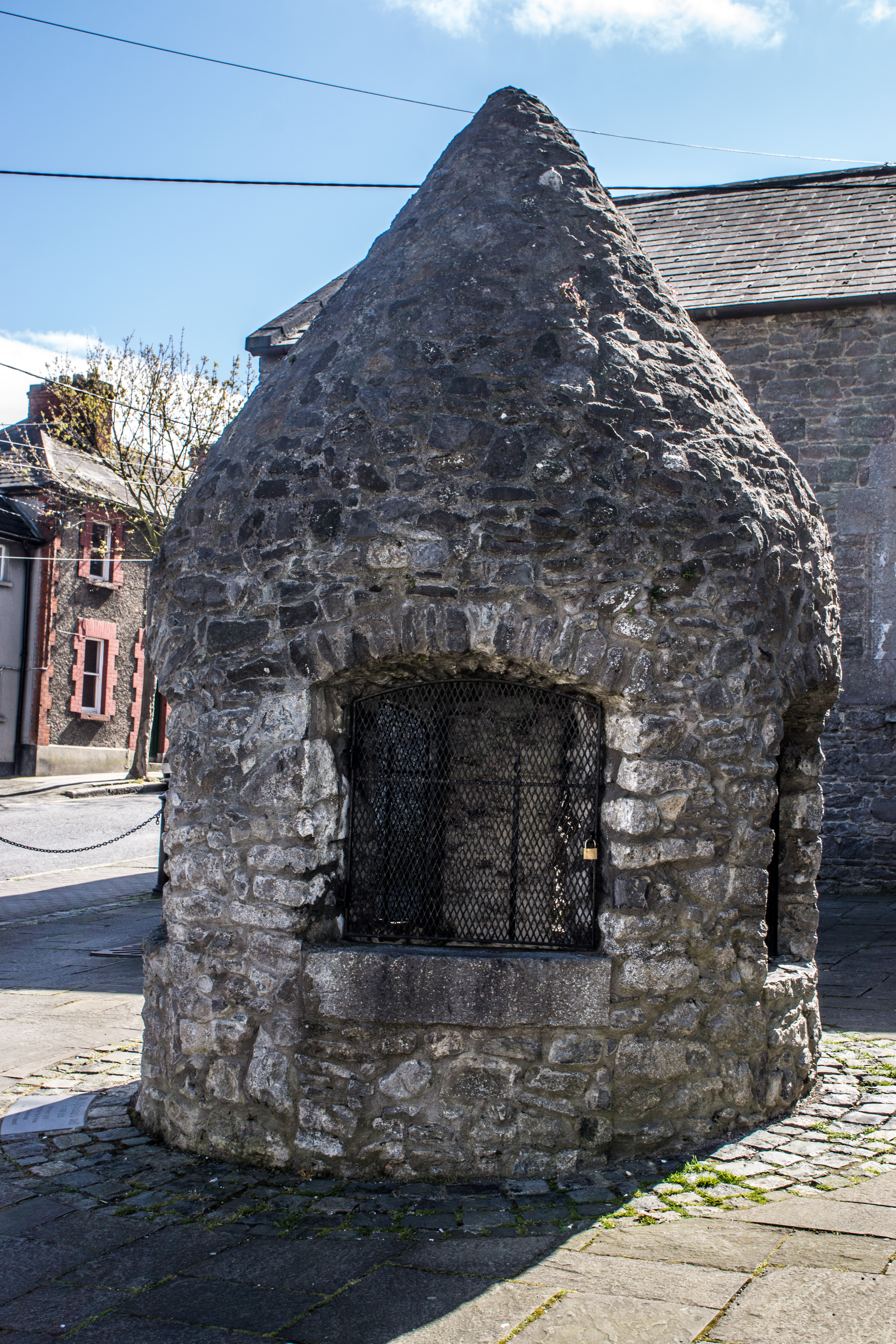
St. Sylvester's Well at the junction of Old Street and Railway Avenue

Malahide has two Catholic parishes, St. Sylvester's and Yellow Walls, and one Church of Ireland parish (St. Andrews), and also forms part of a Presbyterian community, with a church built in 1956 as the first Presbyterian church in the Republic of Ireland since 1922 (it is one of two churches of the Congregation of Howth and Malahide). The Star of the Sea Carmelite convent has been in the town since 1975.

== Transport ==
=== Trains ===
Malahide railway station opened on 25 May 1844. It is now one of the northern termini of the DART system, (the other being Howth). The station features a heritage garden and a decorative ironwork canopy, which contains the monogram of the Great Northern Railway ('GNR'), who operated the route prior to the nationalisation of the railways.

The railway crosses the Broadmeadow estuary on the Broadmeadow viaduct, known locally as The Arches. The original viaduct was a wooden structure built in 1844, which was replaced with an iron structure in 1860 and a pre-cast structure in 1966–7.

==== Viaduct collapse ====
On 21 August 2009, the 18:07 train from Balbriggan to Connolly was passing over the 200-year-old viaduct when the driver noticed subsidence and the embankment giving way on the northbound track. The train passed over the bridge before it collapsed and the driver alerted authorities. An inquiry was to investigate the possibility that seabed erosion was the primary cause of the collapse. A member of Malahide Sea Scouts had contacted Iarnród Éireann five days before the collapse about possible damage to the viaduct and a change in water flow around it.

=== Buses ===
Dublin Bus provides bus services in the area on routes H2, 32X, 42, 42N, 102 and 142:

- Route H2 connects Malahide with Portmarnock, Baldoyle, Howth Road, Raheny, Killester, Clontarf West, Fairview, Connolly Railway Station and terminates at Abbey Street.
- Route 32X connects Seabury, Malahide, Portmarnock, Baldoyle, Clontarf Road, Fairview, Connolly Railway Station, Saint Stephen's Green, Leeson Street, Donnybrook Village, RTÉ and terminates at UCD's Belfield campus.
- Route 42 connects The Hill, Malahide Village, Seabury, Kinsealy, Clare Hall, Coolock, Malahide Road, Artane Roundabout, Donnycarney Church, Fairview, Connolly Railway Station and terminates at Eden Quay.
- Route 42N is Friday and Saturday only route which serves Kinsealy, Seabury, Malahide Village, Portmarnock (Coast Road), Wendell Avenue, Carrickhill Road, Strand Road and Portmarnock.
- Route 102 serves Malahide village en route to Seabury, Waterside, Mountgorry Way, Pavilions Shopping Centre, Swords Main Street, Boriomhe, River Valley and terminates at Dublin Airport. In other direction this route serves Coast Road, Sand's Hotel, Wendell Avenue, Carrickhill Road, Portmarnock, Strand Road, Baldoyle and terminates at Sutton Dart Station. On 2 December 2018, this route was taken over by Go-Ahead Ireland.
- Route 142 connects The Hill, Malahide Village, Seabury, Waterside, Mountgorry Way, Holywell, M1, Port Tunnel, City Quays, Saint Stephens Green, Rathmines, Palmerston Park, Dartry Road, Milltown Road, Bird Avenue and terminates at UCD Belfield. It operates in morning and evening peak Monday to Friday only.

== People ==
Former and current residents include:

- Cecelia Ahern, author
- Georgina Ahern, model and writer
- Nicky Byrne, singer with Westlife
- David Drumm, banker
- Brendan Gleeson, actor
- Jameson Irish Whiskey family
- Robbie Keane, Irish international soccer player
- Ronan Keating, singer with Boyzone
- James Vincent McMorrow, musician
- Conor O'Brien (Villagers), musician
- Dolours Price, Provisional IRA member
- Suzanne Jackson-O'Connor, television presenter and blogger
- Ollie Campbell, Irish international rugby player
- Marty Whelan, radio and TV presenter

People born and/or raised in Malahide include:

- Sinéad Aherne, All-Ireland winner with the Dublin senior ladies' footballer
- Adam Clayton, U2 musician
- Peter Talbot, Roman Catholic Archbishop of Dublin
- Director, rock group
- The Edge, musician with U2
- Keith Galvin, All-Ireland winner with the Dublin senior men's football team
- Rene Gilmartin, footballer
- Brian Gleeson, actor
- Domhnall Gleeson, actor
- Brian Inglis, journalist
- Pat Ingoldsby, poet and TV presenter
- Tom Kettle, barrister, writer, soldier and war poet
- Mark Little, news correspondent
- Susan Loughnane, model and actress
- Niamh McEvoy, All-Ireland winner with the Dublin senior ladies' footballer and Australian Rules footballer
- Sharon Ní Bheoláin, news presenter
- Gabrielle Reidy, actress
- Aodhán Ó Ríordáin, politician
- Conor Sammon, footballer for the Republic of Ireland national football team
- David Wilkins, Olympic silver medalist in sailing

== See also ==
- List of abbeys and priories in Ireland (County Dublin)
- List of towns and villages in Ireland
