= Connolly station =

Railway station in Dublin, Ireland

Connolly Stáisiúin Uí Chonghaile
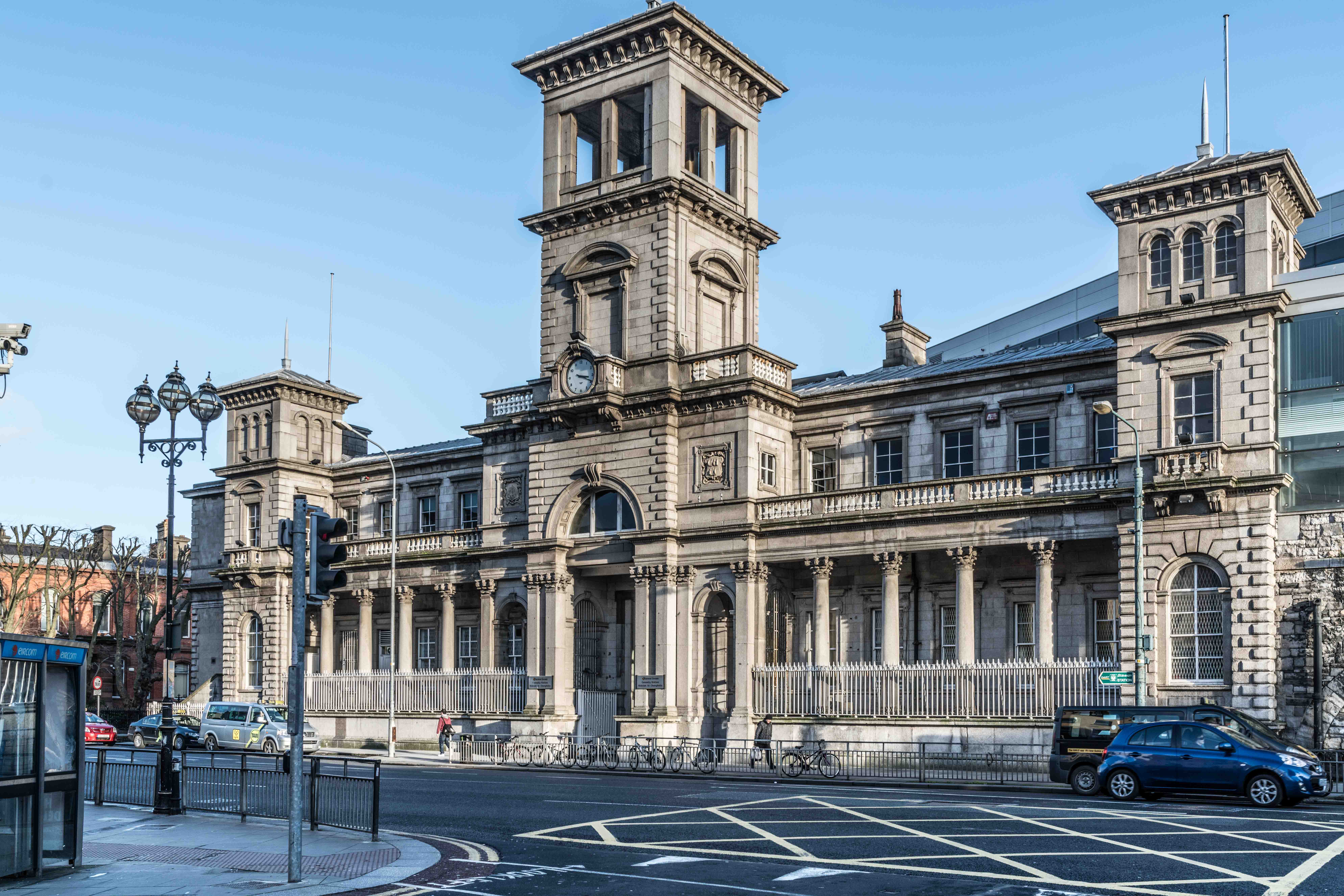
- The Italianate facade of Connolly Station

General information
- Other names: Connolly
- Location: Amiens Street, Dublin 1 Ireland
- Coordinates: 53.3512°N 6.2502°W
- Owner: Iarnród Éireann
- Lines: Belfast–Dublin line Dublin–Sligo railway line Dublin–Rosslare railway line DART
- Platforms: 7
- Tracks: 11
- Bus operators: Bus Eireann; Dublin Bus; Go-Ahead Ireland; Nolans
- Connections: 14; 15; 27; 27A; 27B; 27X; 42; 42N; 43; 53; 115; 115C; 115X; 120; 120B; 120F; 120X; 126; 126A; 126D; 126N; 126T; 126X; 130 (GAI); 132; 151; 853; Red Line

Construction
- Structure type: Elevated
- Parking: Yes
- Cycle facilities: Yes

Other information
- Station code: IÉ: CNLLY; NIR: DN
- Fare zone: Suburban 1

History
- Opened: 29 November 1844; 181 years ago

Key dates
- 1844: Opened as Dublin Station
- 1854: Renamed Amiens Street Station
- 1966: Renamed Connolly Station after James Connolly on the 50th anniversary of the 1916 Easter Rising
- 1983: Station upgraded
- 1999: Station refurbished and partially rebuilt
- 2004: Luas stop opened
Services
Preceding station	Iarnród Éireann	Following station
Terminus	Enterprise	Drogheda MacBride towards Belfast Grand Central
Drumcondra or Broombridge or Leixlip Louisa Bridge or Maynooth towards Sligo Mac Diarmada	InterCity Dublin–Sligo	Terminus
Tara Street towards Rosslare Europort	InterCity Dublin–Rosslare	Terminus
Tara Street towards Gorey	Commuter South Eastern Commuter	Terminus
Tara Street or Terminus towards Grand Canal Dock	Commuter Northern Commuter	Howth Junction or Clongriffin or Portmarnock or Malahide towards Dundalk Clarke
Tara Street or Terminus towards Grand Canal Dock	Commuter Western Commuter (City Branch)	Drumcondra towards Longford
Tara Street towards Grand Canal Dock	Commuter South Western Commuter (City Branch)	Drumcondra towards Newbridge
Tara Street towards Greystones	DART	Clontarf Road towards Malahide or Howth
Preceding station	Luas	Following station
Busáras towards Saggart or Tallaght	Red Line (Connolly wye)	Terminus
Former services
Preceding station	Disused railways	Following station
Terminus	Dublin and Drogheda Railway	Clontarf; Line open, station closed
Great Victoria Street; Line open and station closed	Great Northern Railway (Ireland); Enterprise Express	Terminus
Future services
Preceding station	Future services	Following station
Drumcondra	DART; Line 1	Tara Street or Terminus
Route map
(Click to expand)
Location

Arrivals/Departures board

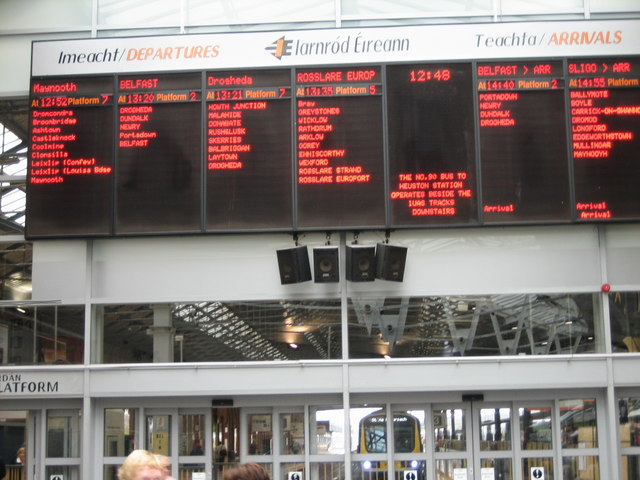
In 2006

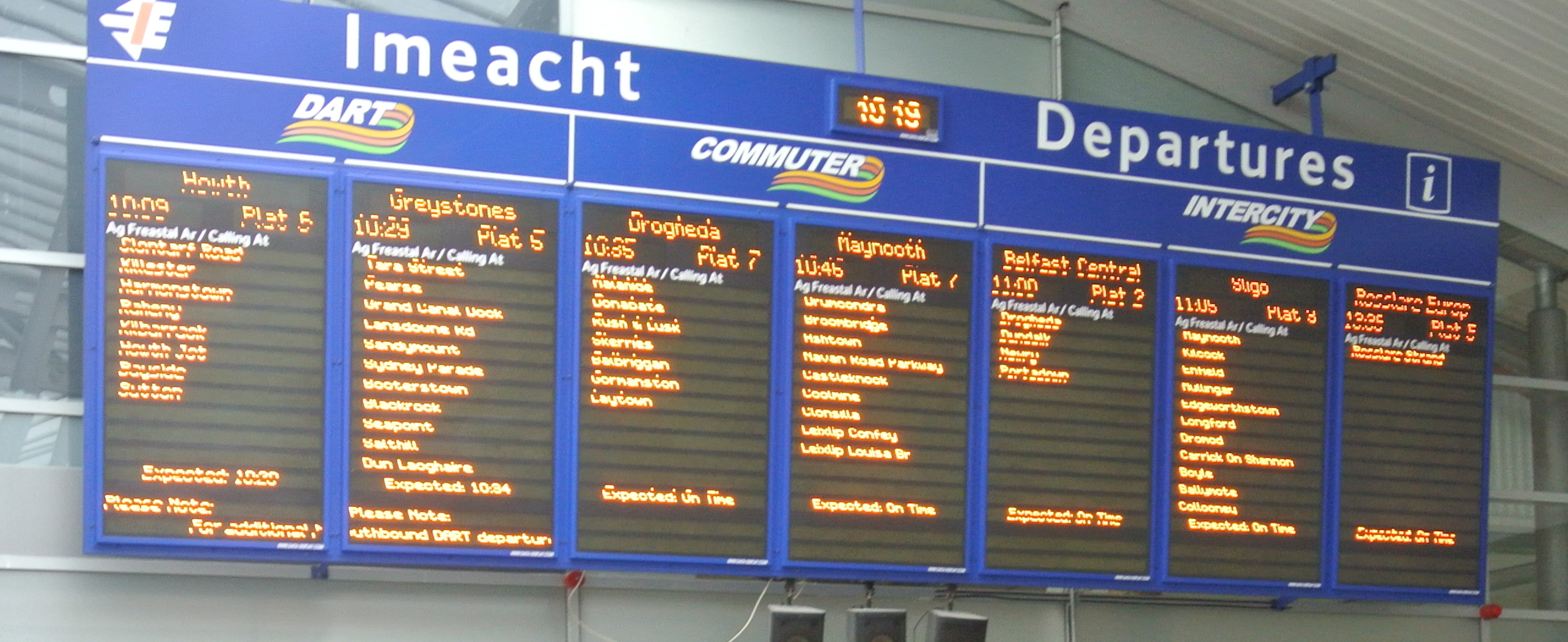
In 2015

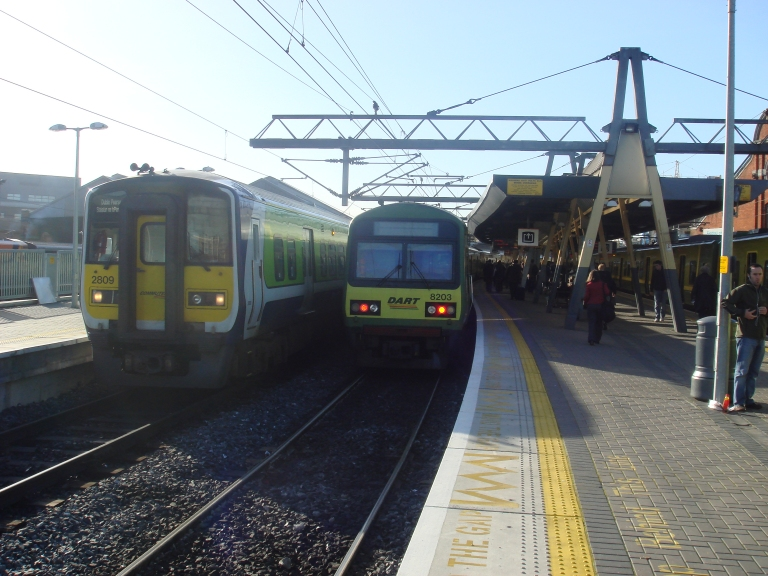
Commuter and DART trains at Dublin Connolly Station

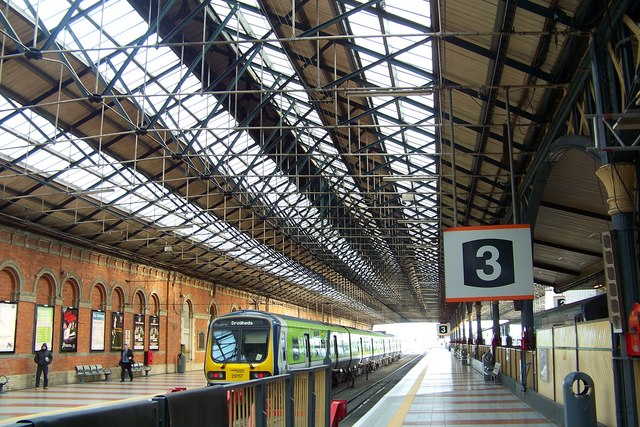
Platform 3 at Connolly Station with a Commuter train arriving on platform 4

Connolly station (Irish: Stáisiún Uí Chonghaile) or Dublin Connolly is the busiest railway station in Dublin and Ireland, and is a focal point in the Irish route network. On the North side of the River Liffey, it provides InterCity, Enterprise and commuter services to the north, north-west, south-east and south-west. The north–south Dublin Area Rapid Transit (DART) and Luas red line light rail services also pass through the station. The station offices are the headquarters of Irish Rail, Iarnród Éireann. Opened in 1844 as Dublin Station, the ornate facade has a distinctive Italianate tower at its centre.

== History ==
On 24 May 1844 the Dublin and Drogheda Railway (DDR) began public operations from an interim terminus at the Royal Canal, and on the same day the foundation stone for what is now Connolly station was laid by Earl de Grey, Lord Lieutenant of Ireland. The station was opened for operations on 29 November 1844 as Dublin Station, but was renamed Amiens Street Station ten years later, after the street where it is located. The terminus building, which was also to be the DDR's headquarters, designed by William Deane Butler, was constructed of Wicklow granite at a cost of £7,000 and opened in 1846. The 6.7-metre (22-foot) flight of steps from the street was to prove difficult for luggage porters and some thirty year later a sloped ramp from opposite Store Street was created to allow step-free pedestrian and vehicle access to platform level.

Originally the station served only a single mainline to Drogheda, and in 1853 through services to Belfast commenced, and an amalgamated company, the Great Northern Railway Ireland (GNRI) taking over operations. In 1879, architect John Lanyon designed a red sandstone and brick headquarters for the GNRI.

In 1891, the City of Dublin Junction Railway opened a separate station called Amiens Street Junction immediately next to the DDR's station. Amiens Street Junction had through platforms, allowing passengers to travel over the Loopline Bridge to Westland Row on the city's Southside and onwards to Rosslare.

In 1937, the MGWR's Broadstone Station was closed, and the services to Sligo were transferred to Westland Row via Amiens Street Junction.

After the amalgamation of the GNR (I) at the end of the 1950s, the two stations were merged into one, simply called Amiens Street. The platforms built by the DDR became platforms 1–4, now used for Intercity and Enterprise trains to Sligo and Belfast; the platforms built by the CDJR became platforms 5–7, used for DART, Commuter and Rosslare services; the DDR's station building became the main passenger entrance and ticket hall; and the CDJR's building fell into disuse.

In 1966, the 50th anniversary of the Easter Rising, Amiens Street was selected as one of fifteen main stations in Ireland to have their names changed to honour patriots executed for their roles in the rising. Amiens Street was renamed Connolly Station, after revolutionary socialist James Connolly.

Services to Galway and County Mayo, via Mullingar and Athlone, had run through Connolly to Pearse from 1937, but were transferred to Heuston Station in the 1970s. Sunday trains to Cork, Limerick and Waterford during the 1960s operated from Connolly platforms 5, 6 and 7 through the Phoenix Park Tunnel, so as to avoid the cost of opening Heuston for the limited Sunday traffic demand at that time.

In 1984, the electrification of parts of the Dublin-Belfast and Dublin to Wexford lines was completed, and DART services commenced. The red-brick station building built by the CDJR was refurbished and reopened for commuters.

During the late 1990s, Connolly Station was completely renovated and partially rebuilt. An entirely new station hall was built, the roof over platforms 1 to 4 was replaced, and a new bar/café and shops were installed. The former DART/Suburban station entrance (CDJR building) and the secondary station hall (further north on Amiens Street) were again closed, but a new entrance on the International Financial Services Centre side was opened.

=== Connection to Luas Red Line ===
In September 2004, the Red Line of the Luas light rail system opened between Connolly and Tallaght. Connolly was selected as the eastern terminus after a part of the line through the Docklands was initially scrapped due to public opposition in 2000. The ramp on the southern side of the station was demolished and replaced with a two-platform tram station connected to the main concourse by escalators and lifts.

An extension of the Red Line to the Docklands, which bypasses the terminus at Connolly, was greenlighted in August 2006. Since it opened in December 2009, most trams terminate at The Point and do not stop at Connolly, but the Busáras stop on the through line is only two minutes walk away.

=== Opening of Docklands station ===
In March 2007, Docklands station opened east of Connolly as an alternative terminus for Western Commuter services. According to then Minister for Transport Martin Cullen, it was created as an "immediate, practical, value-for-money transport solution", as Connolly did not have capacity for additional peak-time trains. Since the partial reopening of the Navan line to Dunboyne in 2010, peak-time services from M3 Parkway station via Dunboyne station terminate at Connolly on weekends and bypass the station on weekdays to terminate at Docklands.

=== Re-opening of Phoenix Park Tunnel ===
While Connolly mainly connects Dublin to the East Coast of Ireland and to Sligo MacDiarmada, Dublin Heuston serves the South and West of the country. A heavy-rail link between the two stations has existed through the Phoenix Park Tunnel since 1877, which was historically only regularly used by freight trains and for the transfer of rolling stock and locomotives to the main service depot at Inchicore. Regular passenger services through the tunnel to Hazelhatch and Celbridge station were launched in November 2016. However, they do not stop at Heuston, which does not have a platform on the northbound side of the line.

=== Resignalling project ===
An infrastructure project by Iarnród Éireann to improve signalling in Dublin city centre began in March 2015 and was placed in commission on 15 November 2020. According to Iarnród Éireann, the project has provided the ability to operate 20 trains per hour in both directions through the Howth Junction to Grand Canal Dock line, which caters for Howth DARTs, Malahide DARTs, Northern Commuter trains, Belfast Enterprise services, Sligo InterCity, Western and South Western Commuter services, as well as other services in the Connolly to Grand Canal Dock area. This means that more trains travel through Connolly rather than terminating; it has also facilitated the use of the Phoenix Park rail tunnel for commuter rail connections.

=== Redevelopment of surrounding area ===
This project redevelops the east section of the Connolly station area "...to provide 81,500 sq. m. of mixed commercial, residential community and leisure uses comprising 50,200 sq. m. of office accommodation; 106 apartments; a hotel; retail and restaurants and a crèche."

In April 2012, CIÉ received planning approval from Dublin city Council for the redevelopment. In September 2017, CIÉ announced it was seeking a partner to develop Connolly Station site. In 2018, CIÉ appointed Oxley Holdings as its partner for the construction of 697 build-to-rent apartments on Sheriff Street Lower. Planning permission was lodged in April 2019.

== Connections ==
=== Tram (Luas) ===
Connolly is an interchange with Dublin's Luas light rail tram system. Built in an area in front of the main station entrance that was previously a bus terminus, the two Luas platforms are covered by a large, segmented canopy. Stairs and lifts directly link the platforms with the station entrance. Passengers can use the Red Line to travel between Connolly and Heuston station.

When the Luas Red Line commenced service in 2004, Connolly was the sole northern terminus. In 2009, the line was extended eastwards to The Point, and Connolly became the sole station on a spur. Immediately after trams leave the stop, they go through a junction. However, in regular passenger service, trams only ever turn right, heading through the city centre towards Tallaght and Saggart. Less than half of all services on the Red Line serve Connolly, and signage at the platforms suggest that passengers make the short walk to Busáras Luas stop, where trams are more frequent. Connolly Luas stop is closed in the evenings and early mornings.

=== Ferry ===
Connolly station is connected by bus to the ferry terminal at Dublin Port, which is served by Irish Ferries, Stena Line and the Isle of Man Steam Packet Company passengers ferries to Holyhead in Wales, Cherbourg in France and the Isle of Man. The ferry terminal can be reached either by Dublin Bus route 53, shuttle buses operated by the ferry companies or a short taxi ride. InterCity trains run between Connolly and Rosslare Europort, which is served by Stena Line ferries to Cherbourg and Fishguard Harbour in Wales, as well as Irish Ferries services to Pembroke Dock in Wales. Irish Ferries also operates a seasonal route to Roscoff in France.

As the ferry terminal at the Port of Holyhead shares a building with Holyhead railway station, passengers can change by foot onto British trains along the North Wales Coast Line to Bangor, Llandudno Junction, Colwyn Bay, Rhyl, Prestatyn, Chester, Crewe and stations to London Euston. A similar interchange exists at Fishguard Harbour station, which is served by trains to places including Carmarthen, Llanelli and Swansea. Pembroke Dock station is served by trains to Swansea and seasonal services to London Paddington station in the summer. The port in Cherbourg is near the town's railway station, which is served by TER Normandie regional trains to Gare Saint-Lazare in Paris.

Journeys between stations in Ireland and the United Kingdom can be arranged in a single booking through the SailRail ticketing scheme. It is offered jointly by Iarnród Éireann and Transport for Wales and promoted as an alternative to air transport by offering a combined ticket for trains and ferries to for through journeys across the Irish Sea.

==== Former ====
A ferry interchange formerly existed in Dún Laoghaire. Passengers were able to travel on the DART to Dún Laoghaire Mallin station, where they could board ferries by Stena Line at Dún Laoghaire Harbour. The ferry service was discontinued indefinitely in September 2014.

== Services ==
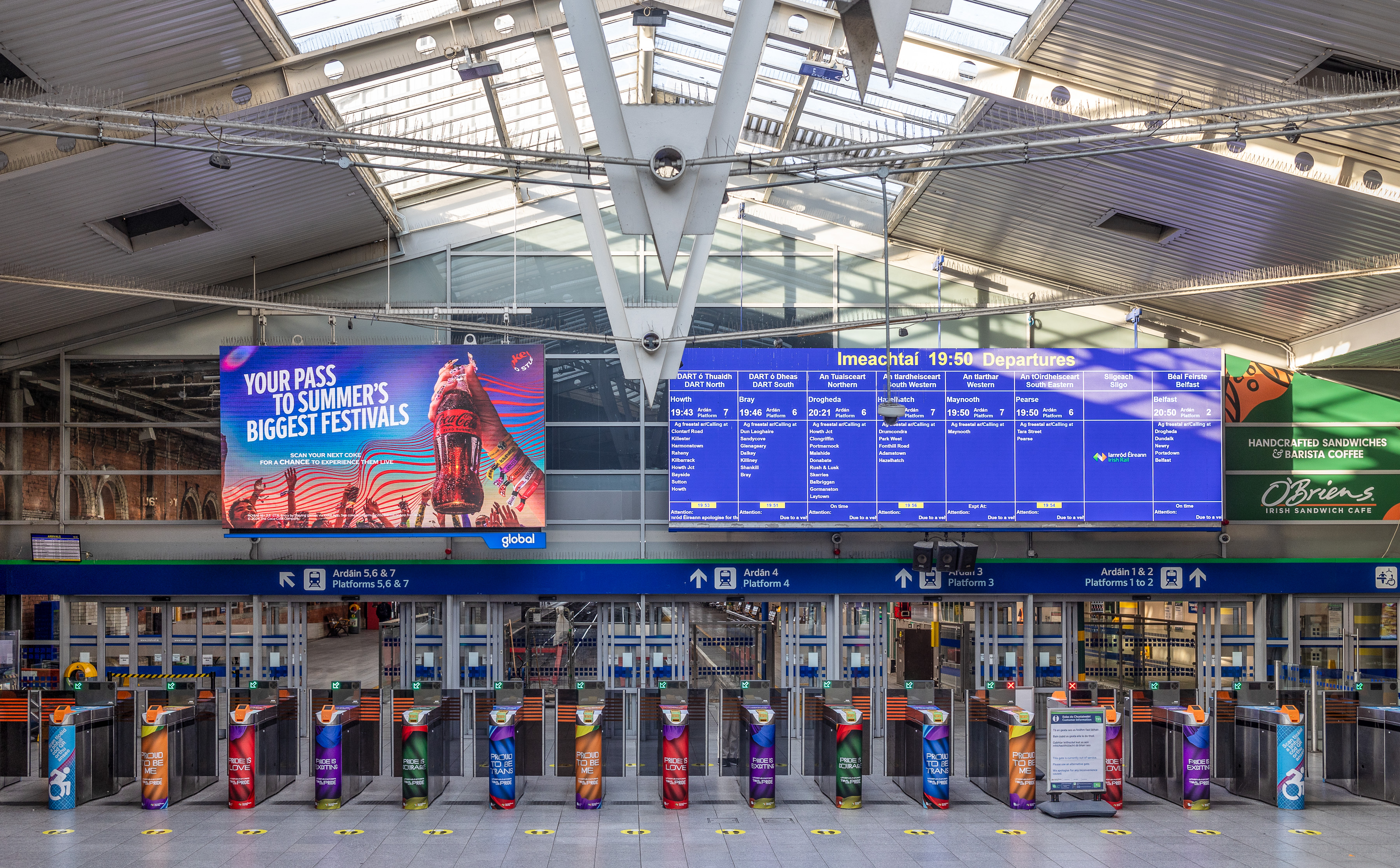
Interior

Connolly has seven platforms; four terminals (1-4) and three through - the former Amiens Street Junction station - (5-7). The ticket office is open from 06:30 hrs to 19:00 hrs, Monday to Sunday. The station also features a depot for the Commuter, the InterCity and the Enterprise.

=== InterCity ===
There are three InterCity routes served:

- The Enterprise service to/from Belfast Grand Central (intermediate stops, Drogheda MacBride , Dundalk Clarke , Newry and Portadown). This departs from platform 2
- Sligo Mac Diarmada stops at Broombridge then non stop to Maynooth and calling at all stations to Sligo. Peak services call at Drumcondra. Departs from platform 1 or 4
- Rosslare Europort, calling at Tara Street, Dublin Pearse, Dun Laoghaire Mallin, Bray Daly, Greystones and all stations to Rosslare Europort. Not all services call at Kilcoole. Peak services call at Blackrock, Lansdowne Road and Grand Canal Dock. The 16:33 departure from Connolly to Rosslare Europort offers a connection to ferries to Wales and France. This service departs from platform 5

=== DART ===
DART services use platforms equipped with overhead wires (Platforms 5, 6, and 7). Terminal Platform 4 is also electrified. As of January 2019, there are 6 DARTs per hour in each direction on weekdays. These are:

- Northbound: 3 per hour to Howth and 3 per hour to Malahide.
- Southbound: 4 per hour to Bray Daly and 2 per hour to Greystones.

After years of delays, Irish Rail increased the DART frequency to every ten minutes in September 2018, which increased the number of trains per hour in Howth and Malahide to three, and those terminating at Bray Daly to four per hour—but kept Greystones at two per hour, with some peak services also terminating at Dún Laoghaire Mallin. It is also planned to expand the DART lines to Maynooth, Hazelhatch and Balbriggan or Drogheda MacBride.

=== Commuter ===
Some Commuter services run along the DART line as far as Malahide. There are 2 Commuter services per hour in each direction off-peak. These are:

- Maynooth from platforms 6 or 7: Calling at all stations to Maynooth.
- Drogheda MacBride/Dundalk Clarke from platform 6 or 7: Calling at Malahide and all stations to Drogheda MacBride/Dundalk Clarke, with some services also calling at Howth Junction, Clongriffin and Portmarnock.

2 trains per hour to Dublin Pearse from platform 5 or 6.

Peak time services also run to Longford, Hazelhatch, Newbridge, Dundalk Clarke, Balbriggan, Grand Canal Dock and Bray Daly. There are also 3 trains per day from M3 Parkway to Connolly but do not run the return journey.

== Statistics ==
Year	Daily passenger exit and entry	Change
2012	27,605	NA
2013	25,823	▼1,782
2014	24,960	▼863
2015	28,506	▲3,846
2016	30,966	▲2,460
2017	36,989	▲6,023
2018	38,804	▲1,815
2019	38,999	▲195

== Gallery ==
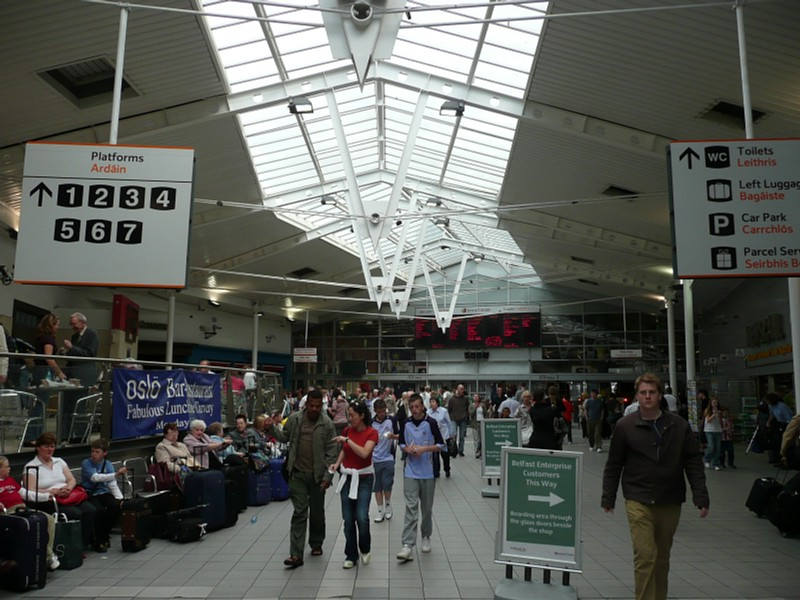
The front of the main concourse in 2007

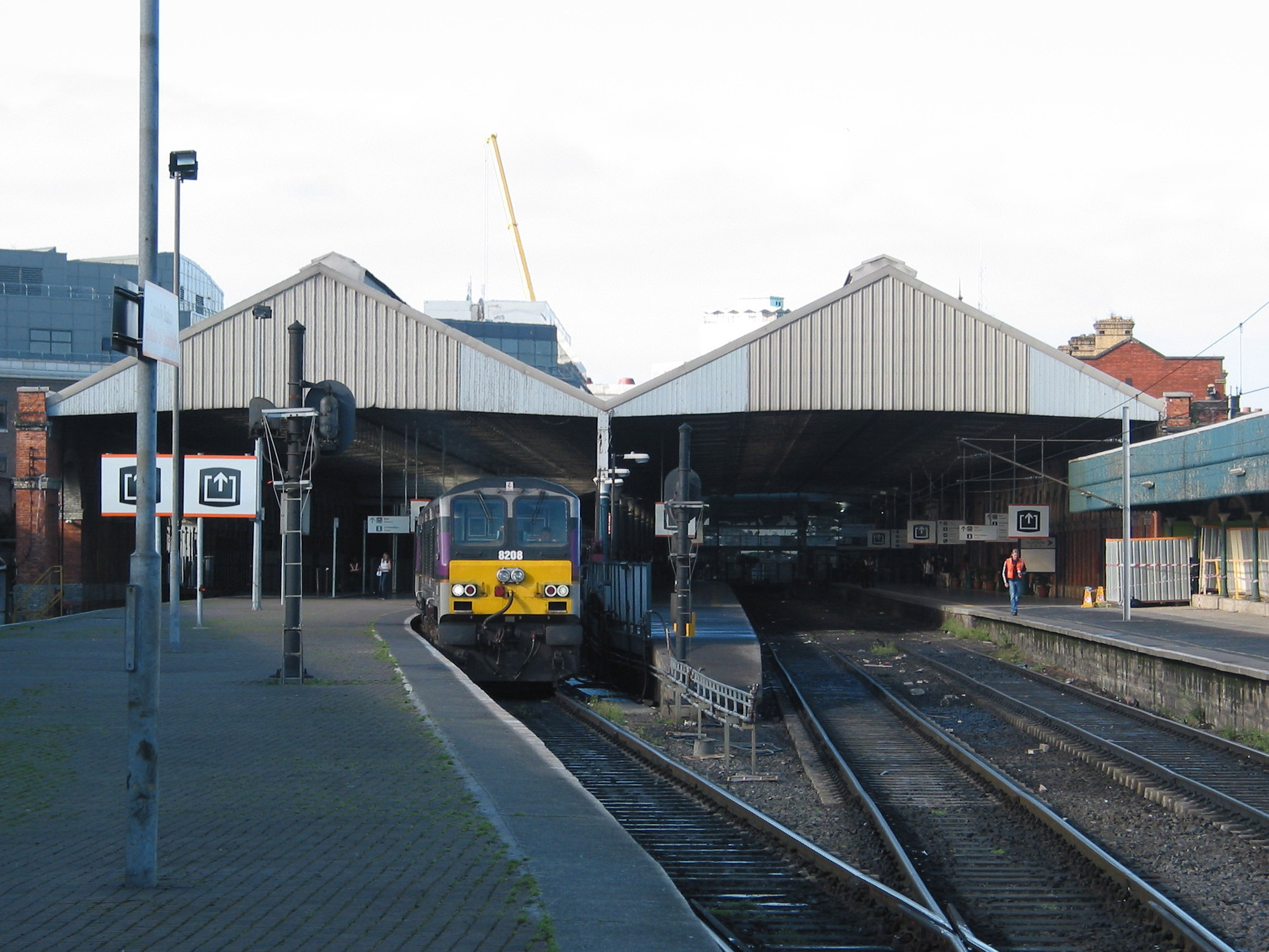
Terminus platforms 1 to 4 in 2004

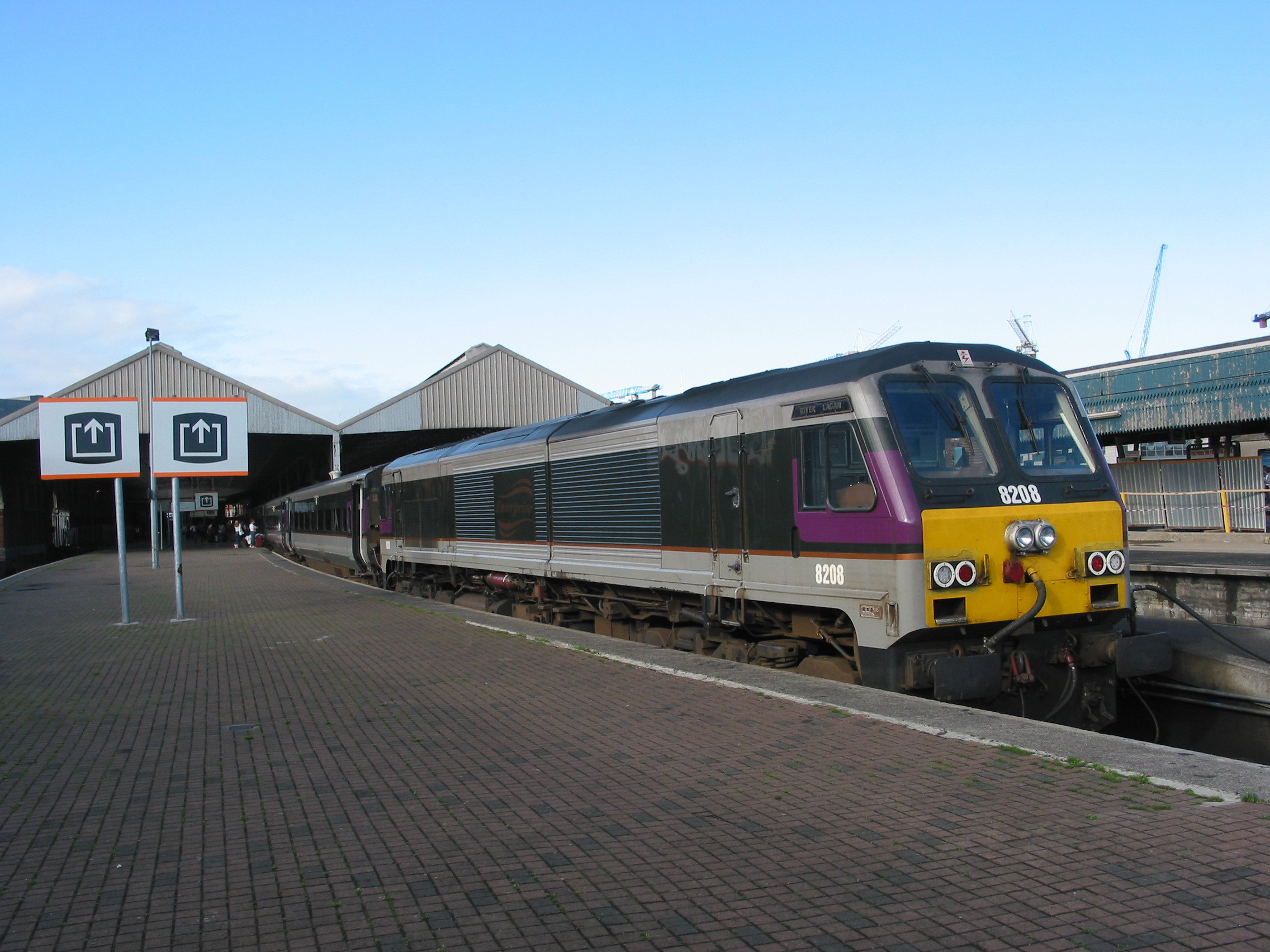
NIR Locomotive with an Enterprise service to Belfast Central (Now Lanyon Place)

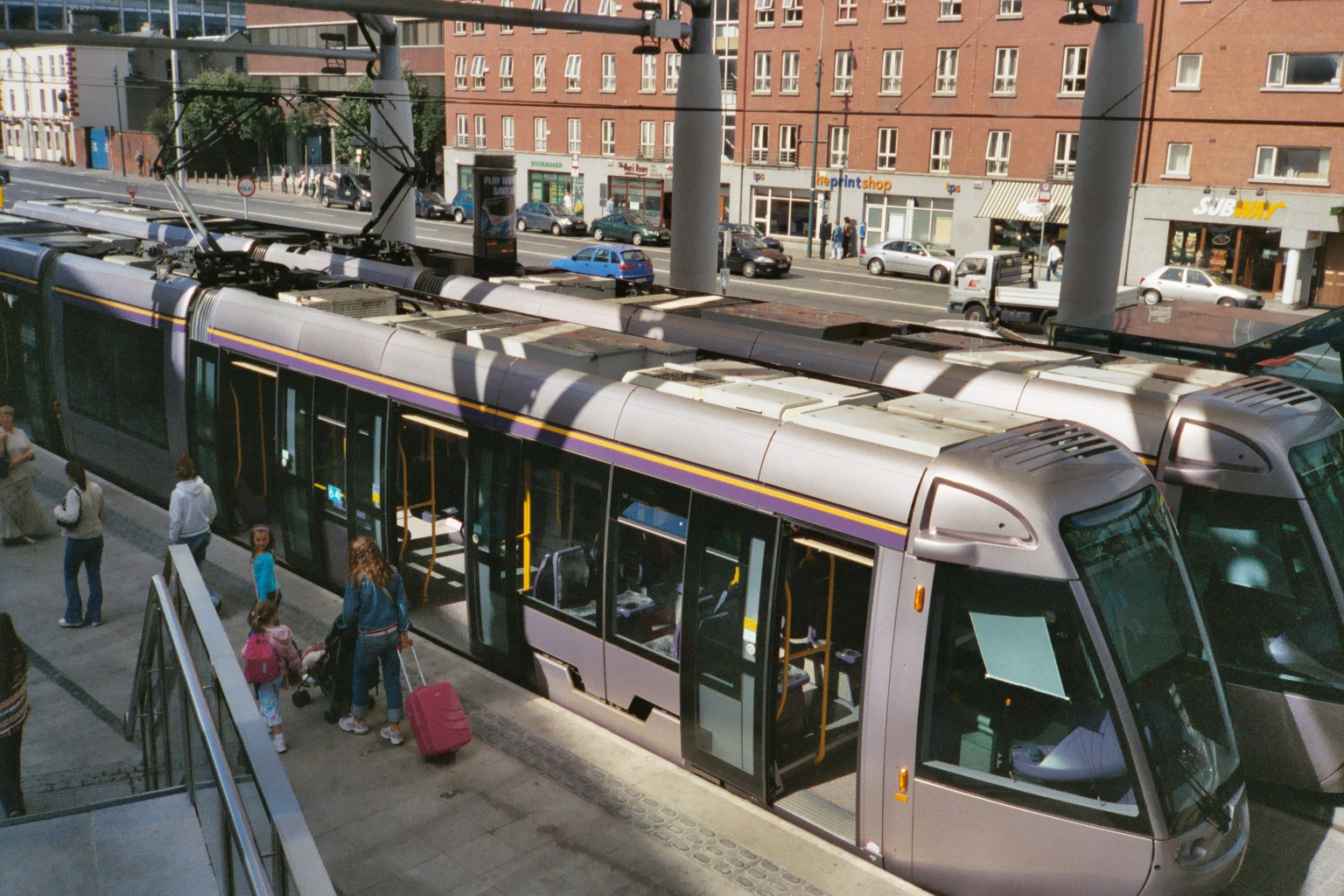
Luas tram terminus at the station entrance in 2005

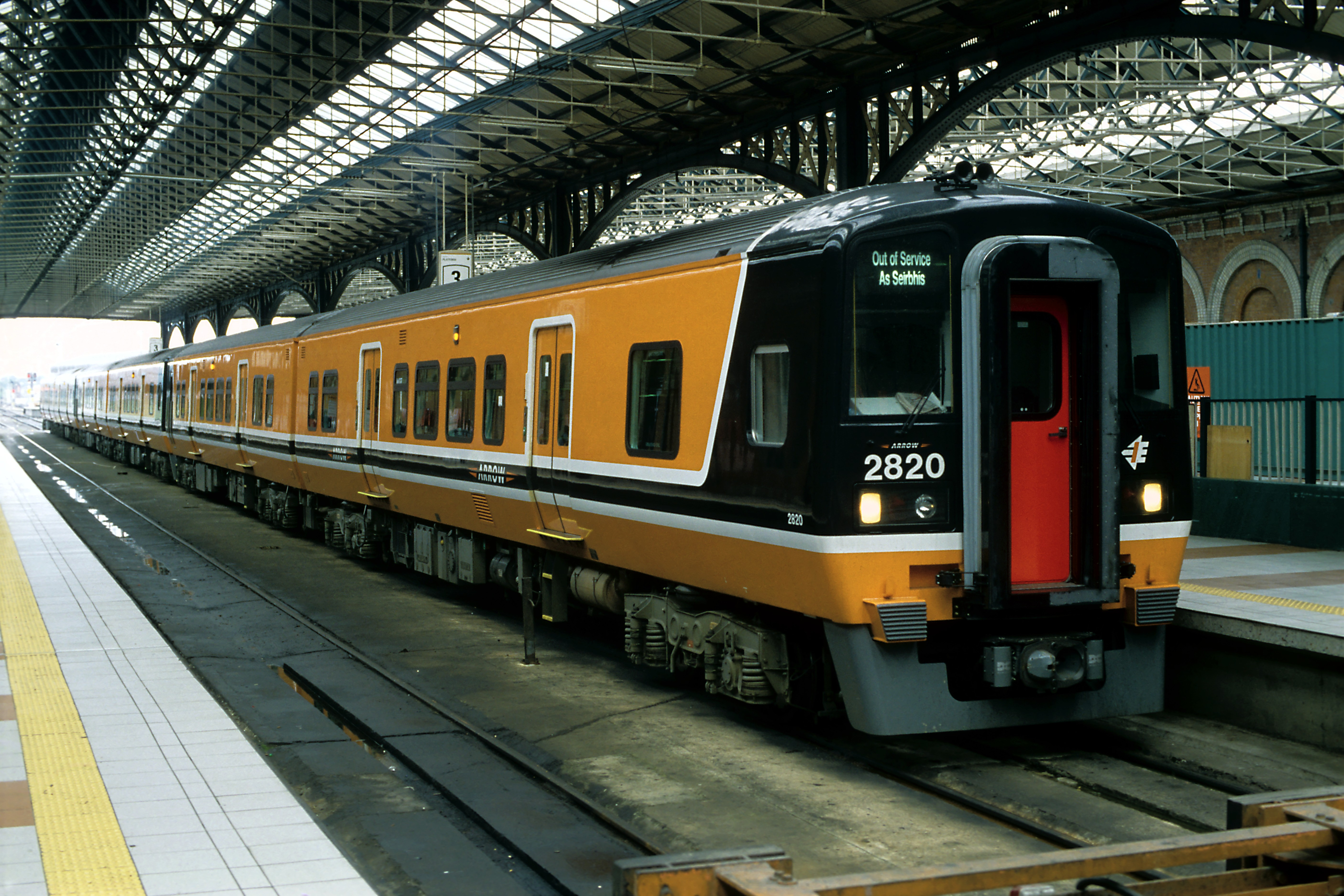
Out of Service Class 2800 in the arrows livery on platform 3 on the 21 June 2001

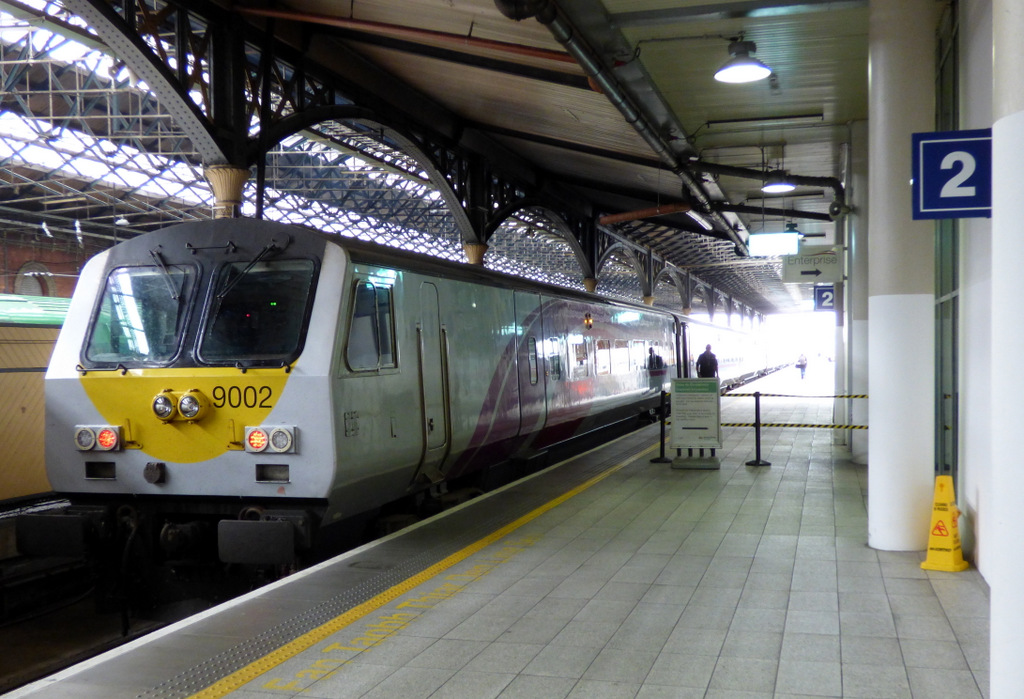
Enterprise waiting on Platform 2 for its trip to Belfast 1 June 2019

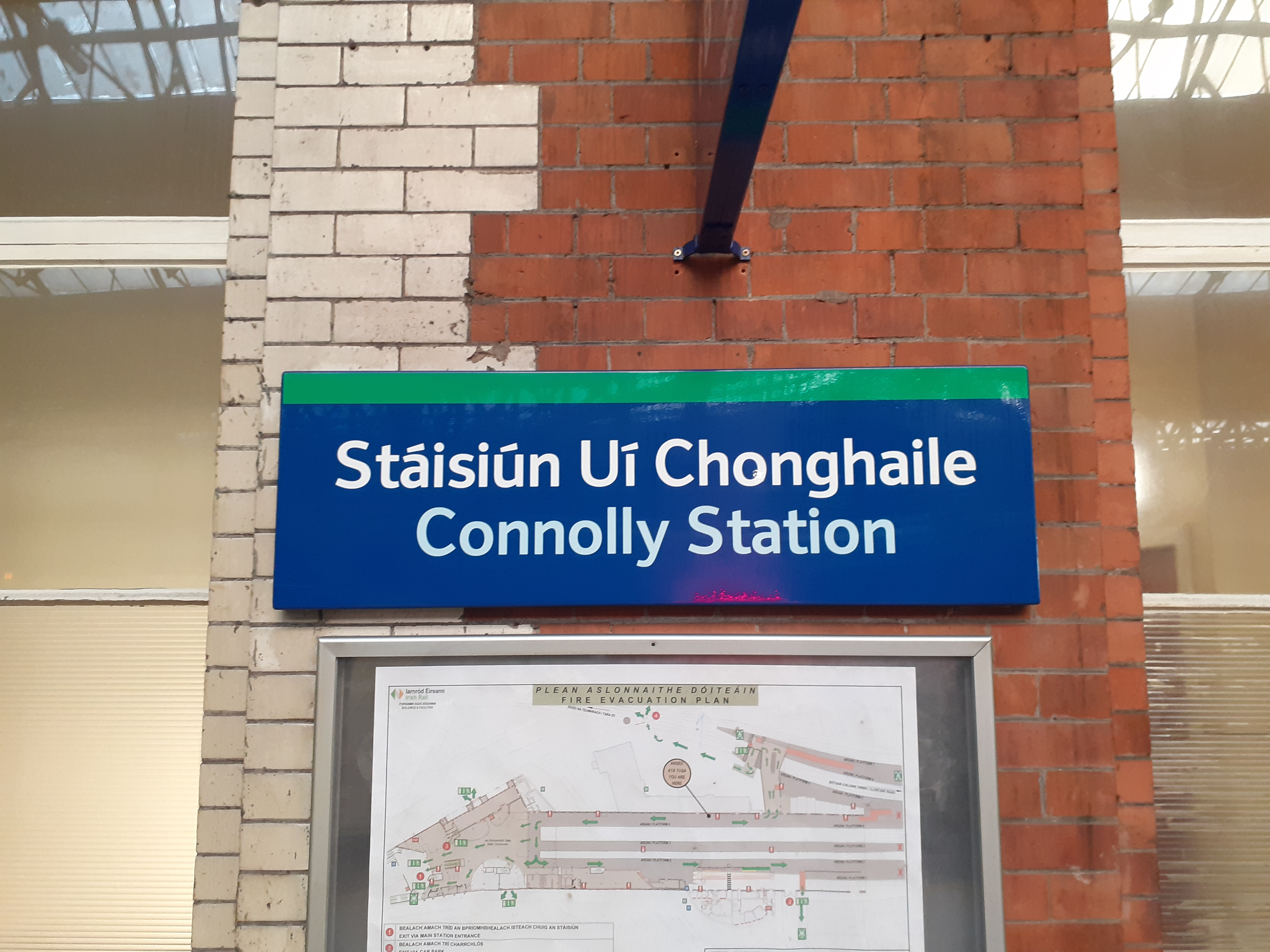
Connolly Station Sign

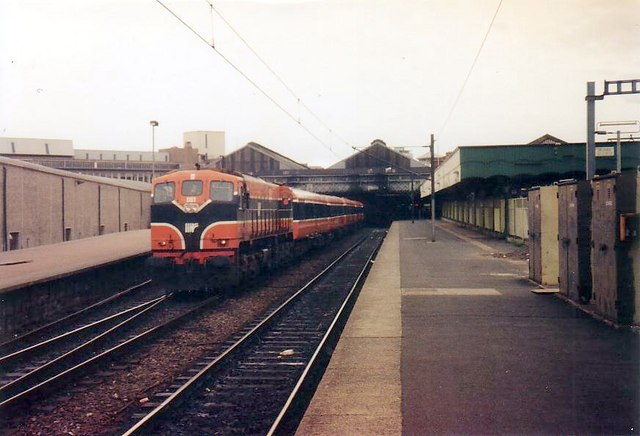
Train leaving Connolly station 5 September 1992

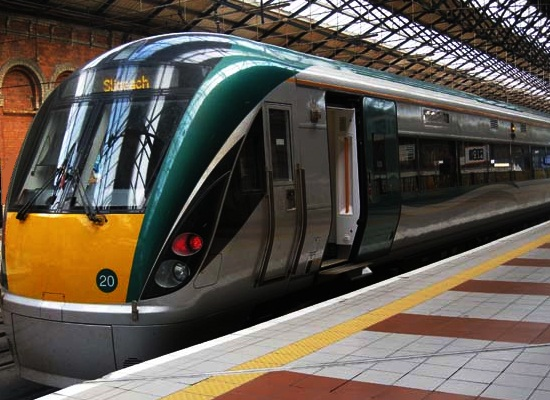
Class 22000 ready to depart to Silgo 23 August 2010

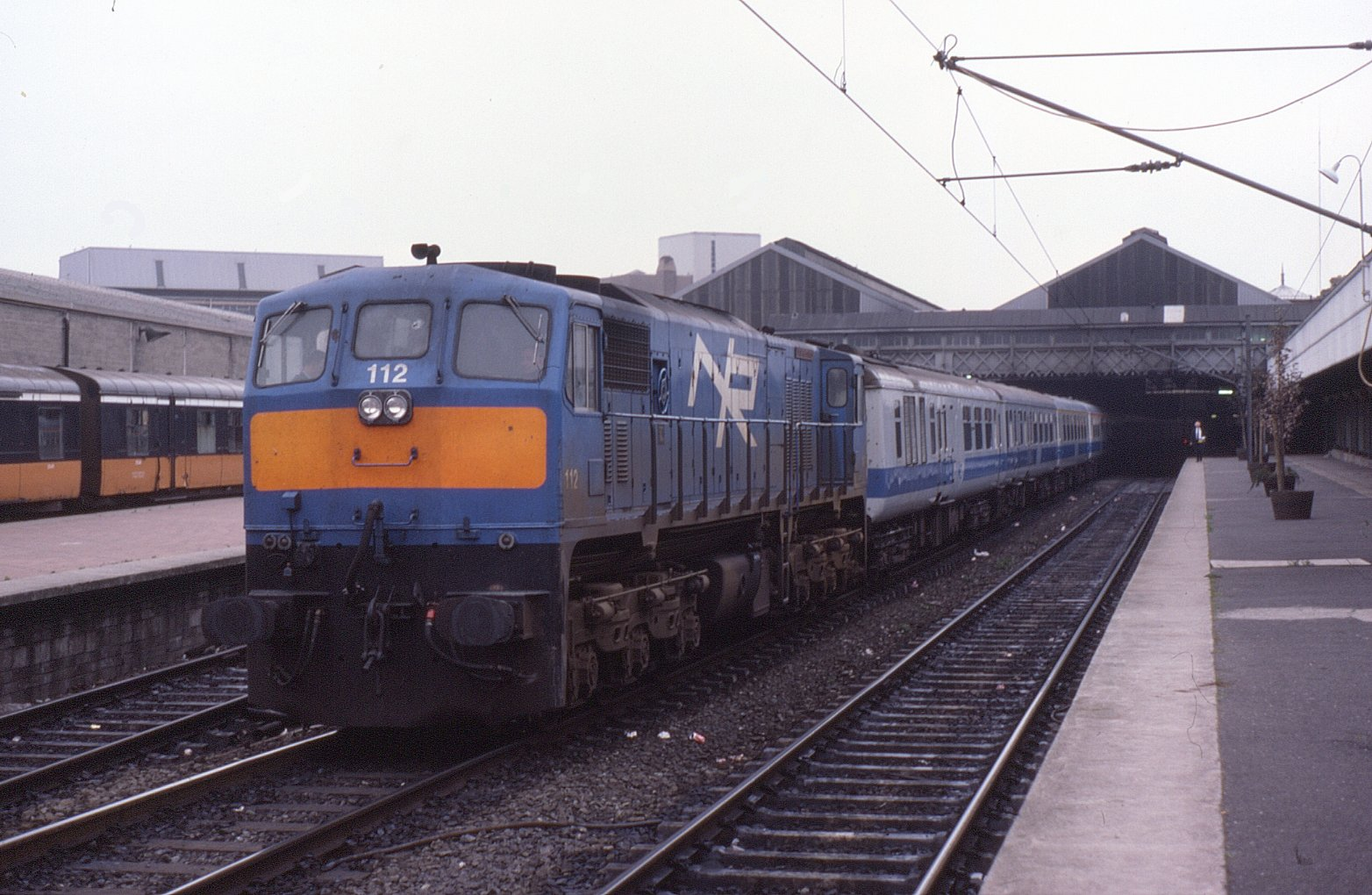
The Enterprise train being run by NI Railways branded coaches 19 October 1985, 10:57

== See also ==
- List of railway stations in Ireland
- Dublin Connolly railway station (DART)
