= Portmarnock railway station =

Station in County Dublin, Ireland

Portmarnock Port Mearnóg
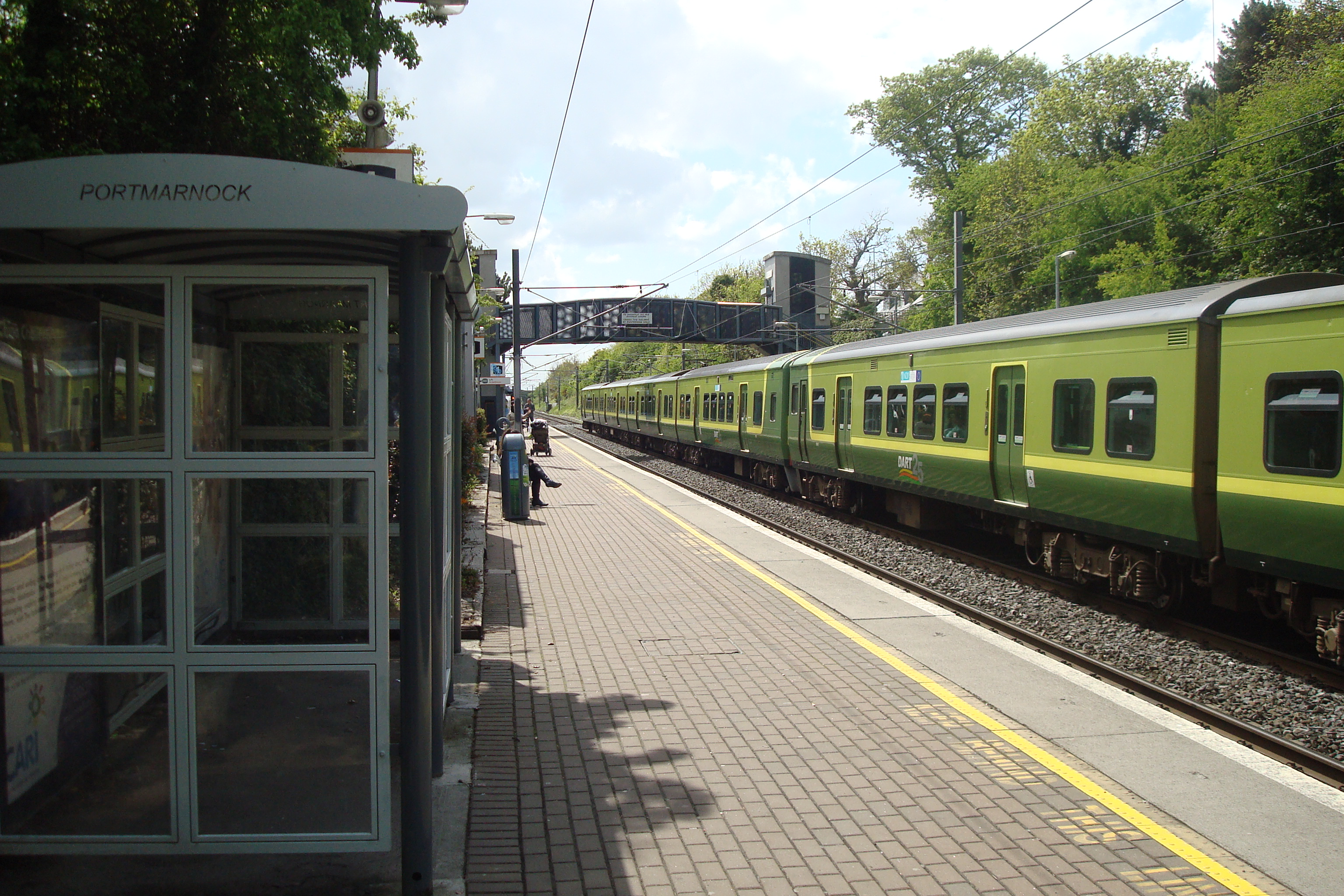
- Portmarnock train station looking South with a DART 8500/8510 Class arriving at platform 2.

General information
- Location: Station Road, Portmarnock; County Dublin; Ireland
- Coordinates: 53°25′04″N 6°09′05″W
- Owner: Iarnród Éireann
- Line: Belfast–Dublin line
- Platforms: 2
- Tracks: 2
- Bus operators: Go-Ahead Ireland
- Connections: 102

Construction
- Structure type: At-grade

Other information
- Station code: PMNCK
- Fare zone: Suburban 2

History
- Opened: 25 May 1844
- Original company: Dublin and Drogheda Railway
- Pre-grouping: Northern Railway of Ireland
- Post-grouping: GNRI
- Pre-nationalisation: CIÉ Railways Division

Key dates
- 10 April 2000: DART services commence

Services
Preceding station	Iarnród Éireann	Following station
Clongriffin or Howth Junction or Dublin Connolly towards Dublin Connolly or Grand Canal Dock	Commuter Northern Commuter	Malahide towards Dundalk Clarke
Clongriffin towards Greystones	DART (Main Line)	Malahide Terminus
Location

Portmarnock railway station (Irish: Stáisiún Phort Mearnóg) serves Portmarnock in County Dublin.

== History ==
The station opened on 25 May 1844.

== Connections ==
The station is served by the DART and Commuter services. Enterprise services pass from Dublin Connolly en route via Drogheda, Dundalk, Newry, Portadown, Lisburn, and Belfast Grand Central. Connecting trains from Dublin Connolly link to Sligo, as well as Rosslare Europort and buses connect Dublin Connolly to Dublin Port for ferries to Holyhead for trains to Chester, Crewe and London Euston.

== Gallery ==
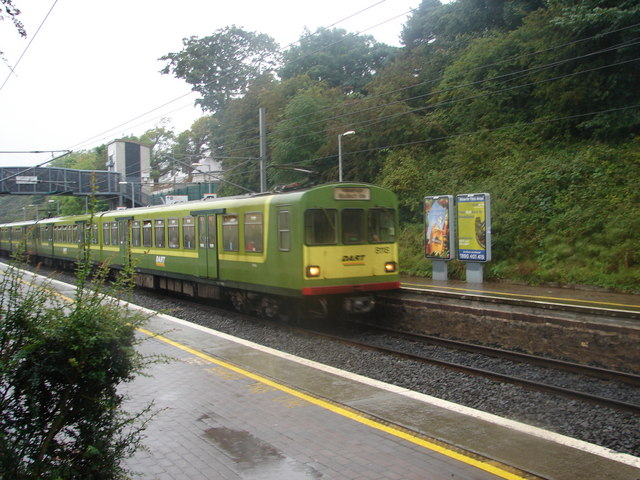
An 8100 Class DART unit arriving at Portmarnock

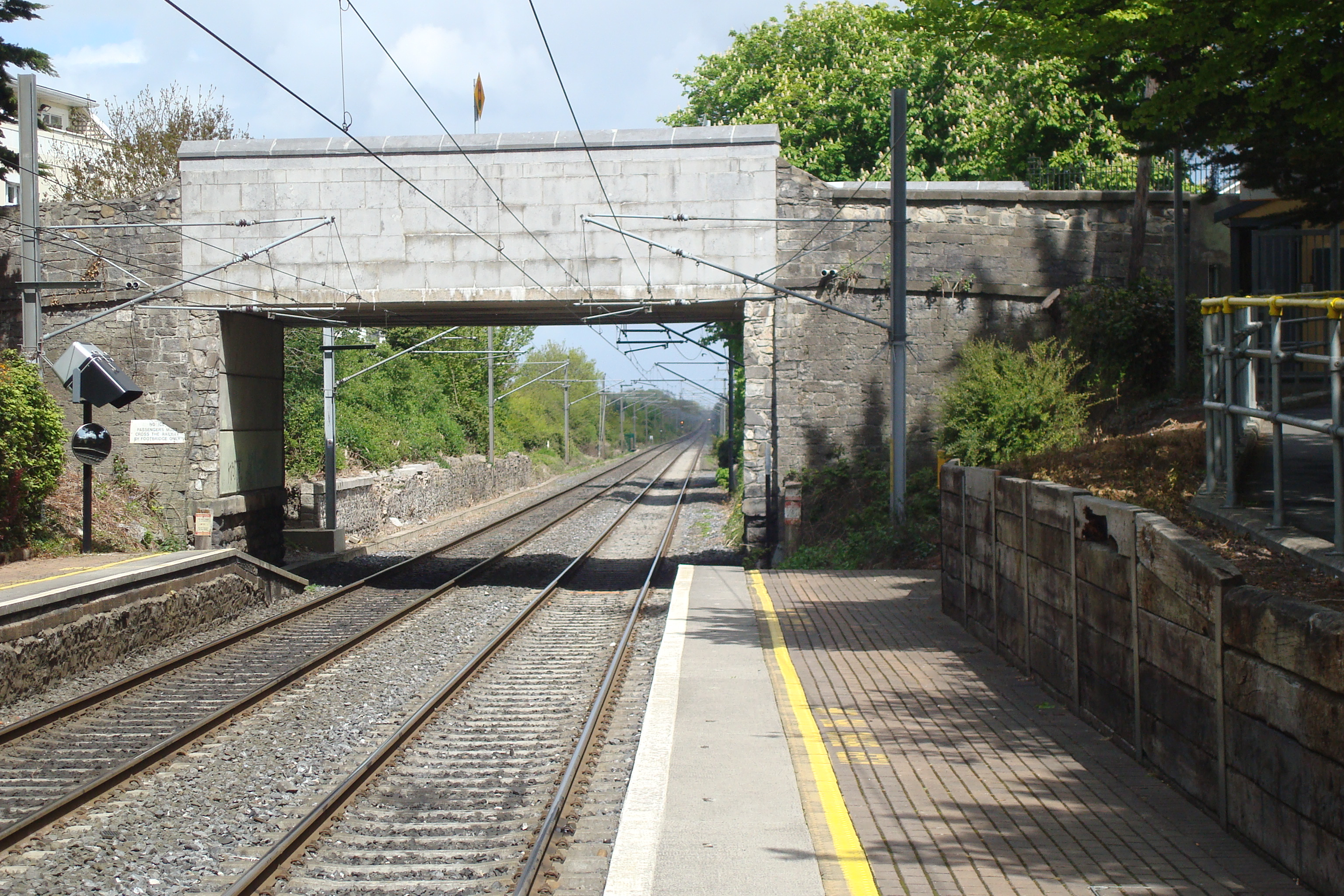
Looking northwards along the rail track and to the right beside the bridge was the location of the old station building which was completely demolished.

== See also ==
- List of railway stations in Ireland
