= Malahide railway station =

Railway station in Ireland

Malahide Mullach Íde
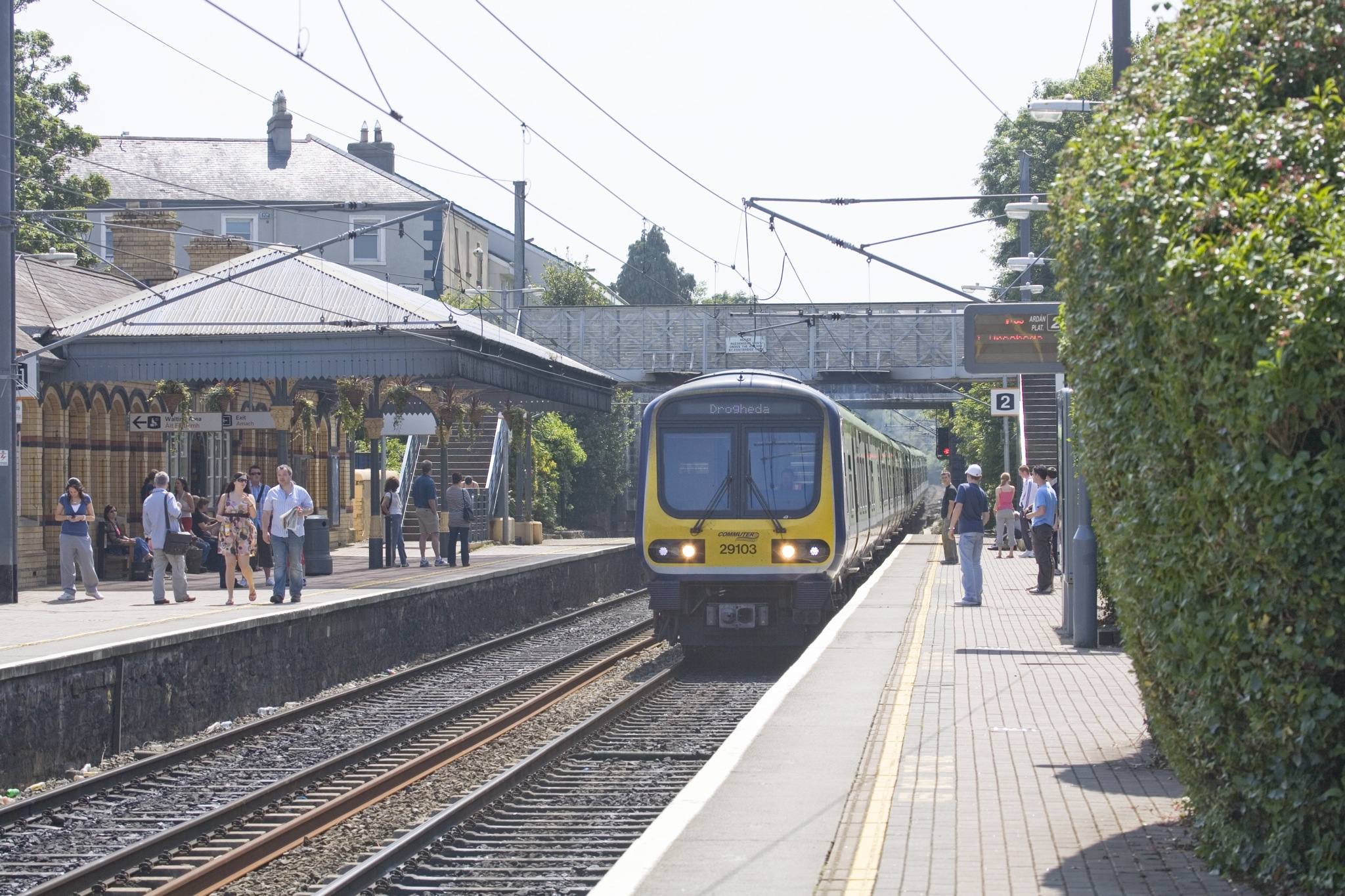
- Commuter service for Drogheda in 2007

General information
- Location: Main Street, Malahide; County Dublin; Ireland
- Coordinates: 53°27′03″N 6°09′23″W
- Owner: Iarnród Éireann
- Line: Belfast–Dublin line
- Platforms: 2
- Tracks: 2
- Bus operators: Dublin Bus; Go-Ahead Ireland
- Connections: 32X; 42; 42D; 102; 102A; 102C; 102P; 102T; 142

Construction
- Structure type: At-grade
- Parking: Yes

Other information
- Station code: MHIDE
- Fare zone: Suburban 2

History
- Opened: 1844
- Original company: Dublin and Drogheda Railway
- Pre-grouping: Northern Railway of Ireland
- Post-grouping: Great Northern Railway (Ireland)

Key dates
- 10 April 2000: DART services commence

Services
Preceding station	Iarnród Éireann	Following station
Portmarnock or Dublin Connolly towards Dublin Connolly or Grand Canal Dock	Commuter Northern Commuter	Donabate towards Dundalk Clarke
Portmarnock towards Greystones	DART	Terminus
Future services
Preceding station	Future services	Following station
Portmarnock	DART; Line 2	Terminus or Donabate
Location

Malahide railway station (Irish: Stáisiún Mhullach Íde) serves Malahide, County Dublin.

== Geography ==
The station lies on the Dublin to Belfast main line, 9 miles (14 km) from Dublin Connolly to the south, with Drogheda and Belfast approximately 23 miles (37 km) and 104 miles (167 km) to the north respectively.

To the south of the station lies Malahide Hill, the railway passing through a cutting about a 1 mile (1.6 km) in length and up to c.40 feet (12 m) deep.

Just to the north of the station, the line crosses the Broadmeadow viaduct which is 164m long and is the most noticeable part of the Malahide Estuary.

== History ==
The station opened on 25 May 1844 as part of the Dublin and Drogheda Railway. (Note: Osgood indicates there was no (or minimal) station construction in 1844 but that it was open as a train stop at that date, with building infrastructure variously placed at between 1856 and 1901. She gives more precise details of what she claims are discrepancies of normally reliable sources on her 2019 blog entry "A Treat at Malahide". As of January 2022 National Inventory of Architectural Heritage continues to attribute the station as an 1851 build to Papworth, while Archiseek's attribution to Mills, while also attributing an unbuilt 1851 design to Papworth.) Earlier, on 6 January 1844, a special train for people including Lords Eliot and Talbot, their wives and other persons gave rides up and down a completed section of track near Malahide.

George Papworth created an elaborate design for the main station building in 1851, in the event this was not built.

A set of company amalgamations occurred in 1875-6 with the station first coming under the Northern Railway Co. (Ireland) and into the Great Northern Railway of Ireland (GNRI) on 1 April 1876. From 1 October 1958 with the break up of the GNRI the station came under the remit of CIÉ.

The main station building in the general polychromatic brickwork style of William Hemingway Mills has been attributed various dates from c. 1851 to 1905.

Malahide became the northern extent of the electrified Dublin Area Rapid Transit (DART) system in 2000.

Goods services were withdrawn in December 1974. In 2009, Malahide became the temporary terminus of all direct services from Dublin as a consequence of the collapse of the Broadmeadow viaduct.

== Infrastructure ==
The station has two through lines and two platforms, the major one being on the east side which is the southbound track to Dublin. Entrance is via yellow brick polychrome style typical of Mills although some features are Malahide specific, notably the ornate wood sliding doors to the platform. The platform roof is supported by decorative ironwork. Access to the other platform is via a bridge with ironwork dating from the 1880s; this had to be raised to allow for the DART electrification extension with disability-accessible lifts newly fitted to the south side. The west platform retains a wooden shelter in mostly original condition. That platform has also been extended at some point but a standard GNR signal box has been retained, albeit boarded up.

== Operation ==
The station is staffed between 05:45-00:30, Monday to Sunday and platform 1 (the eastern or southbound platform) is fully accessible. Platform 2 (the western or northbound platform) can be accessed by a footbridge (with lifts) from platform 1 or via steps to the public road.

=== Services ===
Malahide is both a terminus on the DART system and a station on Northern Commuter services.

=== Bus links ===
Go-Ahead Ireland operated bus route 102 links the station to Dublin Airport, Sutton railway station and parts of Malahide. In October 2013 a shuttle bus linking various areas of the town to the station was introduced. Numbered route 842, it operates in the morning and evening peaks Mondays to Fridays inclusive. The service was temporarily suspended at the start of January 2014.

== Gallery ==
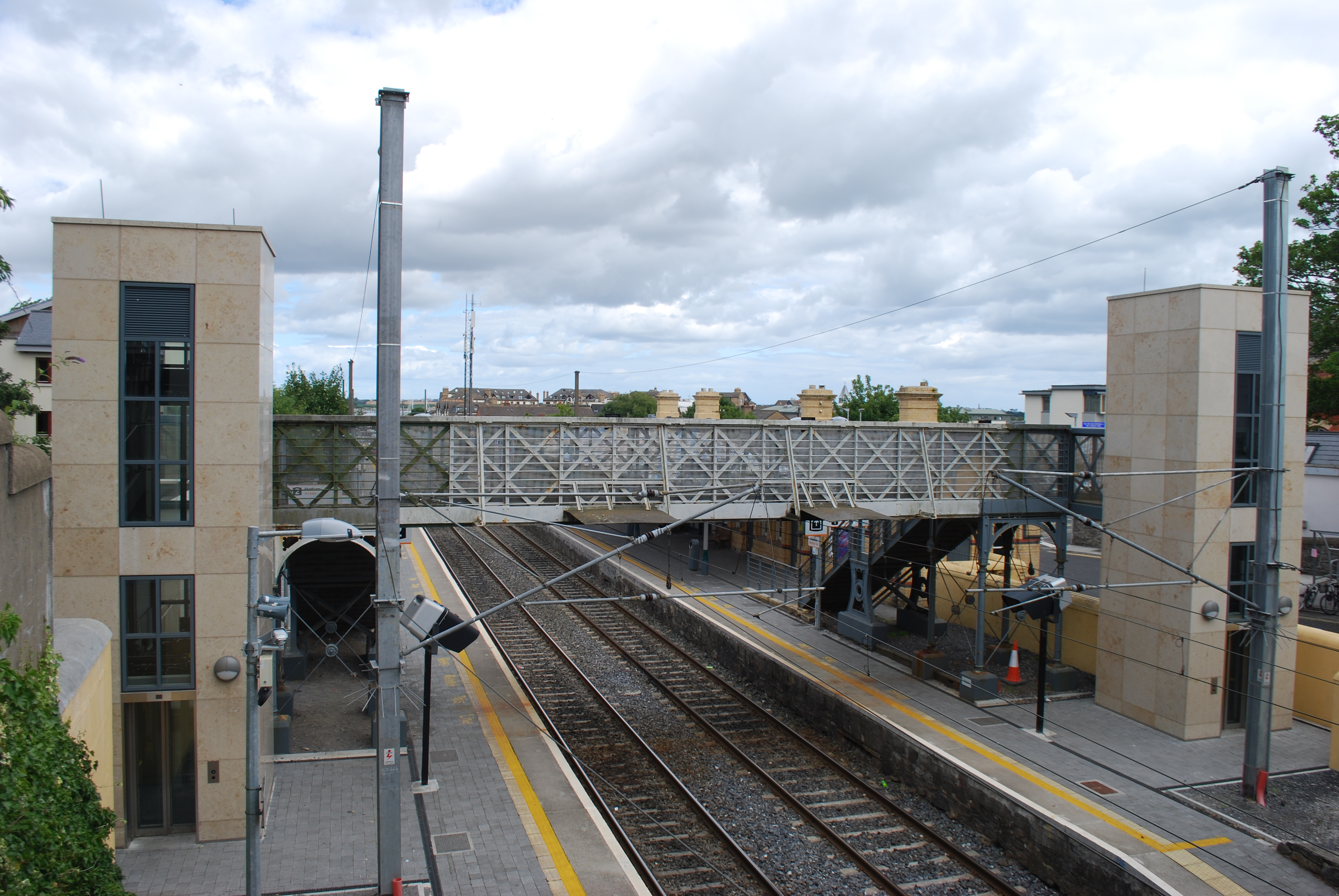
Footbridge at Malahide Station connecting platform 1 and platform 2

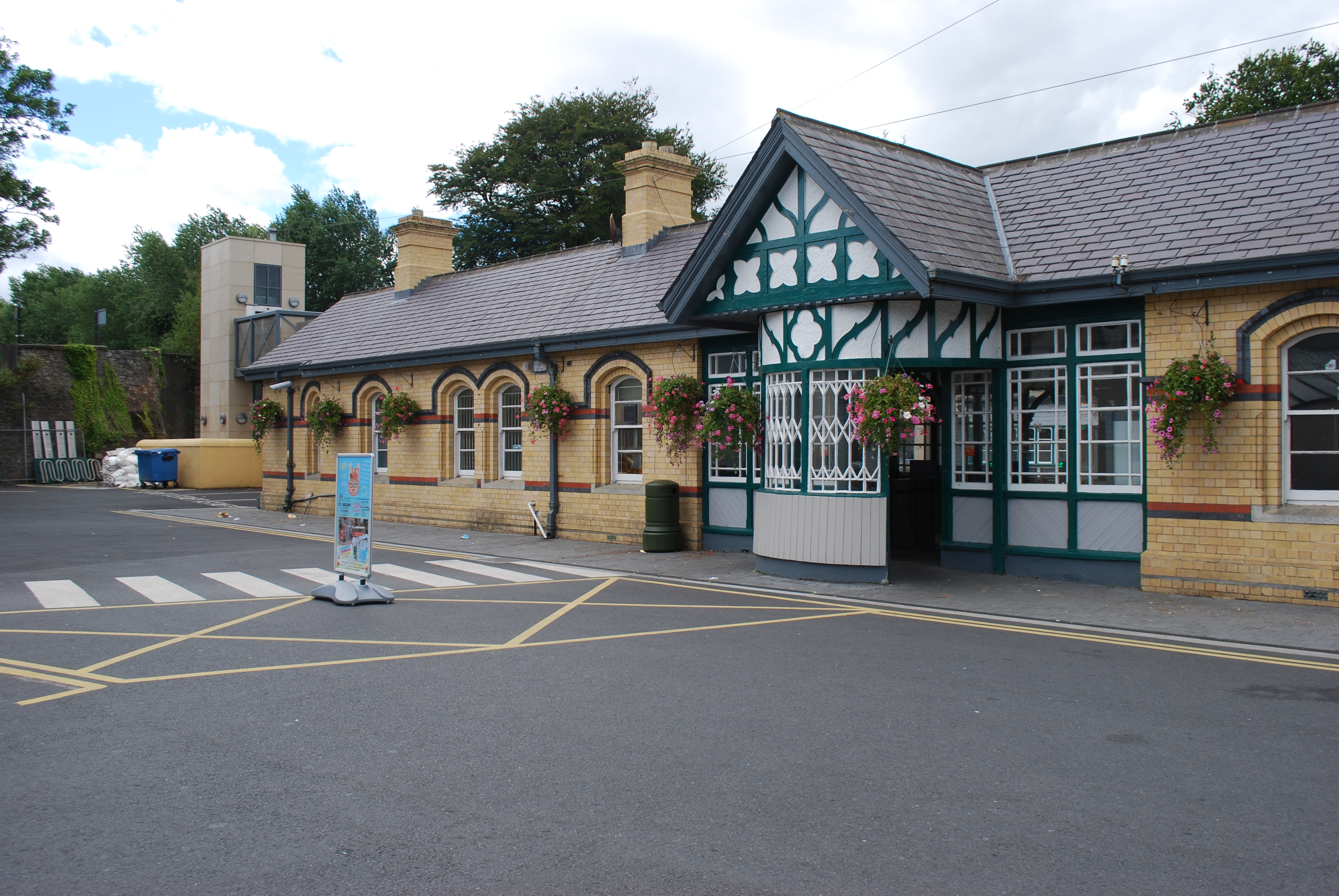
The main station building on the east side of the railway

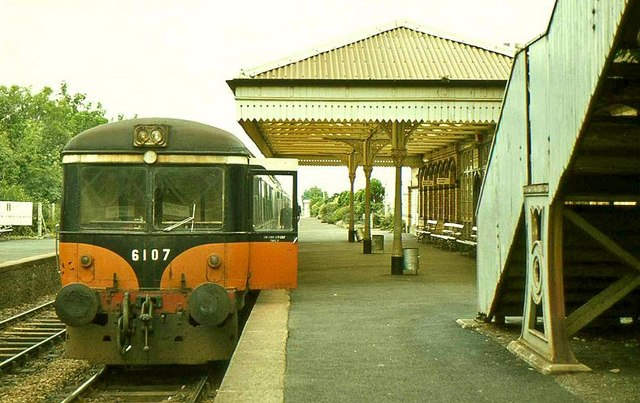
Push-pull commuter train arrives in 1983 on its way to Dublin Pearse

== See also ==
- List of railway stations in Ireland
