= Northern Railway (Ireland) =

Former railway enterprise

The Northern Railway was a short-lived Irish gauge 5 ft 3 in (1,600 mm) railway company in Ireland. It served as a step toward the full amalgamation of the numerous railway companies lying between the cities of Dublin, Belfast and Derry.

It was formed by a merger of the Dublin and Drogheda Railway with the Dublin and the Belfast Junction Railway on 1 March 1875. On 1 January 1876, the Irish North Western Railway joined the company. It was dissolved when it merged with the Ulster Railway to form the Great Northern Railway (Ireland) on 1 April 1876.
