= Milo Talbot =

Milo Talbot is the name of:

- Milo Talbot (British Army officer) (1854-1931)
- Milo Talbot, 7th Baron Talbot of Malahide (1912-1973), son of the above
