= Margaret Stones =

Australian botanical illustrator (1920–2018)

Banksia serrata

Elsie Margaret Stones AM MBE (28 August 1920 – 26 December 2018), was an Australian botanical illustrator.

== Life ==
Stones was born on 28 August 1920 in Colac, Victoria, Australia.

Stones worked as principal contributing artist to Curtis's Botanical Magazine from 1950 to 1981. Between 1958 and 1983 she produced more than 400 watercolour drawings for the magazine.

In 1957 she was commissioned to prepare a set of floral designs for Australian postage stamps.

Stones worked closely with Winifred Curtis between 1967 and 1978 in providing the illustrations for The Endemic Flora of Tasmania which was commisissioned by Rose Maud Talbot and her brother.

In 1976, Stones was commissioned to create a series of six watercolours as part of Louisiana State University's celebration of the American bicentennial. The project's scope was soon expanded, and over the next fourteen years, Stones and a team of LSU botanists traveled throughout the state gathering plant specimens. She eventually completed more than 200 drawings, which were published by the LSU Press in 1991 as Flora of Louisiana. The original drawings, as well as selected working drawings, are now held in the LSU Libraries Special Collections in Hill Memorial Library.

She was awarded a silver Veitch Memorial Medal in 1976 and a gold Veitch Memorial Medal in 1985 by the Royal Horticultural Society. Stones has two genera named after her, Stonesia, and Stonesiella.

In 1977 Stones was made a Member of the Order of the British Empire and in 1988 a Member of the Order of Australia for "service to art as an illustrator of botanical specimens". In 1989, Stones was awarded an Honorary Doctor of Science (DSc (Hon)) from the University of Melbourne.

Stones died at Epworth, Richmond, Victoria on 26 December 2018 at the age of 98. She never married.

== See also ==
List of Australian botanical illustrators
