= The Endemic Flora of Tasmania =

Book about plants in Tasmania, Australia

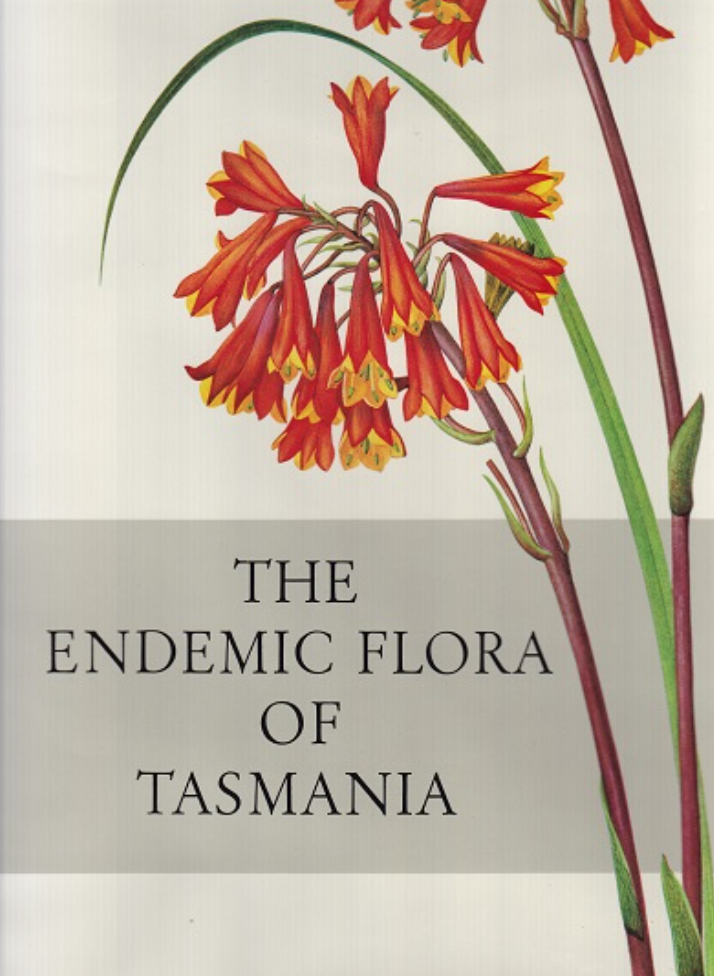

The Endemic Flora of Tasmania was written by Dr Winifred Curtis with coloured lithographs by botanical illustrator, Margaret Stones. It is a six-volume book that was commissioned by the 7th Baron Talbot of Malahide (1912-1973), an Irish peer, and published by the Ariel Press in 1967. Both Stones and Curtis worked alongside each other in Tasmania, Australia, studying the depths of Tasmanian Flora.

== History and Significance of Tasmania Flora ==
Tasmania was discovered during Captain Cook's voyages starting in 1772, and this is when Tasmanian Flora was first appreciated. During his first voyage, there is no historical evidence of his botanical collections, though, on his third voyage to Australia, the first plant collections from ‘The Island of van Diemen’ stemmed. This plant collection was gathered by David Nelson and William Anderson at Adventure Bay.

Jacques Julien Houtou de Labillardiere, a French man joined one a voyage in search of La Perouse in 1800 made significant contributions to the discovery and development of Tasmanian Flora. Labillardiere collected flora, working alongside prisoners who would sketch black and white copper engravings of flora.

In 1804, Robert Brown, a Scottish botanist and naturalist begun analysing the nucleus of a cell, and he also collected 700 species of dried Australian plants during his voyages with Cook. Records of where Brown collected plants is brief, though it can be gathered that he was based at Risdon Cove and Sullivans Cove in Hobart, alongside noting he made significant scientific developments, especially considering the context.

== About The Endemic Flora of Tasmania ==
Source B - Razor used for sectioning plants

The Endemic Flora of Tasmania was written by Winifred Mary Curtis with paintings by Margaret Stones. Curtis was offered the chance to write ecological and descriptive notes that align with the paintings of Stones, all commissioned by Lord Talbot of Malahide. This book originally began as a book series with information of flora, called The Student's Flora of Tasmania, 1967, which evolved into The Endemic Flora of Tasmania. This original version of the book was written by Mary Winifred Curtis, working alongside Dr Gordon. Soon after beginning this project, Dr Gordon resigned from the task; this left Curtis to take on sole responsibilities. At the time she was commissioned by Lord Talbot of Malahide, Curtis was also working at Kew Gardens in the early 1950s as an illustrator, where she was a major contributor to Curtis's Botanical Magazine. Her hard work developed into The Endemic Flora of Tasmania, working alongside Margaret Stones, with their book that includes 55 native plant illustrations, and 36 painted plates by Stones.

Source A - Collecting case

The first volume was published in 1967, the second volume in 1969, the third in 1971, the fourth in 1973, the fifth in 1978, and lastly, the sixth volume was published in 1978. Lord Talbot of Malahide commissioned the project, being a rare plant enthusiast and gardener; he particularly developed the gardens surrounding Malahide Castle, his family seat in the north of County Dublin on the east coast of Ireland. His Lordship also owned a large estate called Malahide in Tasmania itself. However, shortly after part IV was published, he died in 1973. His sister, Rose Maud Talbot, continued the project The appendix, at the end of the book, completes all 6 parts with systematically listed endemic flora based on botanical family and genus Within the appendix, there also is an alphabetical list of all the flora listed in the books. Heather Rossiter notes that these books provide a magnificent monument in honour of Lord Talbot who begun this significant project. Winifred Mary Curtis and Margaret Stones took an active approach in developing their knowledge of Flora in Tasmania as they were often on field, collecting Fauna to explore. Source A shows the collecting case Curtis used when in the field, alongside source B showing the razor she used she to section plants.

== The Authors ==
=== Winifred Mary Curtis ===
Winifred Mary Curtis was born on 15 June 1905, London growing up during the post-Victorian period and died at the age of 100, on 14 October 2005, Hobart. In 1924, Winifred went to University College in London, taking an interest in the study of Botany, Chemistry, Maths and Physics.She developed her passion for flora through her father, who would talk to her about trees, and her mother took pride in her garden. Most women during this period of the early 1900s would stay at home and wait to be married to a man, though Winifred's parents, ‘entertained her thoughts of a career’ encouraging her to pursue her passion. Winifred was continuously rejected by jobs on the basis that she was a woman, disregarding the fact that she had the best qualifications and numerous university certificates. After much rejection, she became a teacher at an all-girls school in Manchester following her degree at Cambridge Teachers College. Curtis and her father moved to Hobart, Tasmania, Australia, in 1939 where she became the second woman to join the academic staff board at the University of Tasmania's School of Plant Science. She studied and taught Zoology and Botany. By late 1942, she was she only full-time female staff member at the university where she also studied chromosome numbers in Dianella.

In 1944, Winifred Mary Curtis was studying the first record of polyploidy which she published and developed a thesis on. In 1951, she significantly was appointed senior lecturer and in following years, was acting head of multiple departments. Despite growing up in a predominantly male society, she published 14 scientific papers, alongside 3 editions of ‘Biology for Australian Students’. Winifred Mary Curtis became the Honorary Research Fellow at the University of Tasmania's School of Plant Science in 1966 and over the next decade, she published seven papers.

In 1966 when Winifred retired at the age of 61, she continued to show her passion for flora which assisted in establishing the Tasmanian Herbarium in 1971.

=== Margaret Stones ===
Margaret Stones provides the coloured lithographs in ‘The Endemic Flora of Tasmania’ working alongside Winifred Mary Curtis throughout the process. She was born in Colac, Victoria in 1920, and died in 2018 at the age in 98. Stones was living during WWII when she studied at Swinburne Technical College before nursing at Epworth Hospital in Richmond.

Stones wasn't actively pursuing art in her life, and it wasn't until she was hospitalised with tuberculosis in 1945 that this changed. She noted the beginning of her passion for drawing wildflowers was in hospital as she showed immense interest in drawing the Australian wildflowers gifted to her by her friends and family.

Daryl Lindsay, an Australian art collector first purchased Stones work in 1946 which ultimately begun her career. Stones moved to London in 1951 to pursue her passion for drawing where she held many solo exhibitions at P & D Colnagi which is one of the most significant print and drawing dealers in London. Stones caught Curtis's attention in 1958 when they worked together producing more than 400 water-coloured drawings for Curtis's Botanical Magazine.

== Reviews ==
‘The Endemic Flora of Tasmania’ has been referred to as being “one of the most important botanical publications in the 20th century” according to the Australian Garden History. This incredibly successful book allowed for the enhancement of public interest in Tasmania flora, providing knowledgeable information and engaging pictures. Frans A. Stafleu, a credible Dutch system botanist and former chairs person of the Institute of Systemic Botany reviews this book with positive words. He notes that the writing style is ‘informative and lightly written’ being informal and easy to read while also having the power to put Tasmania on ‘the map of botanical illustration’. Curtis had such tremendous impact on the world of flora, that she had multiple books honouring her, including ‘Aspects of Tasmania Botany: a tribute to Winifred Curtis’, and ‘Winifred Mary Curtis: A biographical sketch’. This shows the significant influence Curtis had which was enhanced through her monumental book, ‘The Endemic Flora of Tasmania’.
