= Stonesiella =

Conservation status
- Endangered (EPBC Act)

Scientific classification
- Kingdom: Plantae
- Clade: Tracheophytes
- Clade: Angiosperms
- Clade: Eudicots
- Clade: Rosids
- Order: Fabales
- Family: Fabaceae
- Subfamily: Faboideae
- Clade: Mirbelioids
- Genus: Stonesiella; Crisp & P.H.Weston
- Species: S. selaginoides

Binomial name
- Stonesiella selaginoides (Hook.f.) Crisp & P.H.Weston

Genus of legumes

Stonesiella selaginoides, the clubmoss bush-pea, is a species of flowering plant in the family Fabaceae. It belongs to the subfamily Faboideae. It is the only member of the genus Stonesiella and is endemic to Tasmania. It is named to recognise Australian botanical illustrator Margaret Stones.
