= Baron Talbot of Malahide =

Title in the Peerage of Ireland, and of the UK

Baron Talbot of Malahide, Hereditary Lord Admiral of Malahide and Adjacent Seas
- Blazon: Arms: Quarterly: 1st and 4th, Sable six Martlets three two and one Argent (Arundell); 2nd and 3rd, Gules a Lion rampant Or within a Bordure engrailed Erminois (Talbot).; Crests: 1st: a Wolf passant Argent (Arundell); 2nd: on a Chapeau Gules doubled Ermine a Lion passant Erminois (Talbot).; Supporters: Dexter: a Talbot Or; Sinister: a Lion Gules.
- Created by: King George III
- Peerage: Peerage of Ireland
- First holder: Margaret Talbot, 1st Baroness Talbot
- Present holder: Richard John Tennant Arundell, 11th Baron Talbot of Malahide
- Heir apparent: Hon. John Richard Arundell
- Former seat: Malahide Castle
- Motto: DEO DATA; Given by God

Baron Talbot of Malahide (or de Malahide) is a title that has been created twice for members of the same family—in 1831 in the Peerage of Ireland as Baron Talbot of Malahide, and in 1856 in the Peerage of the United Kingdom as Baron Talbot de Malahide. While the barony of 1856 became extinct in 1973, the barony of 1831 is extant. Until 1976, the ancestral seat of the family was Malahide Castle, close to the village of that name, north of Dublin, Ireland.

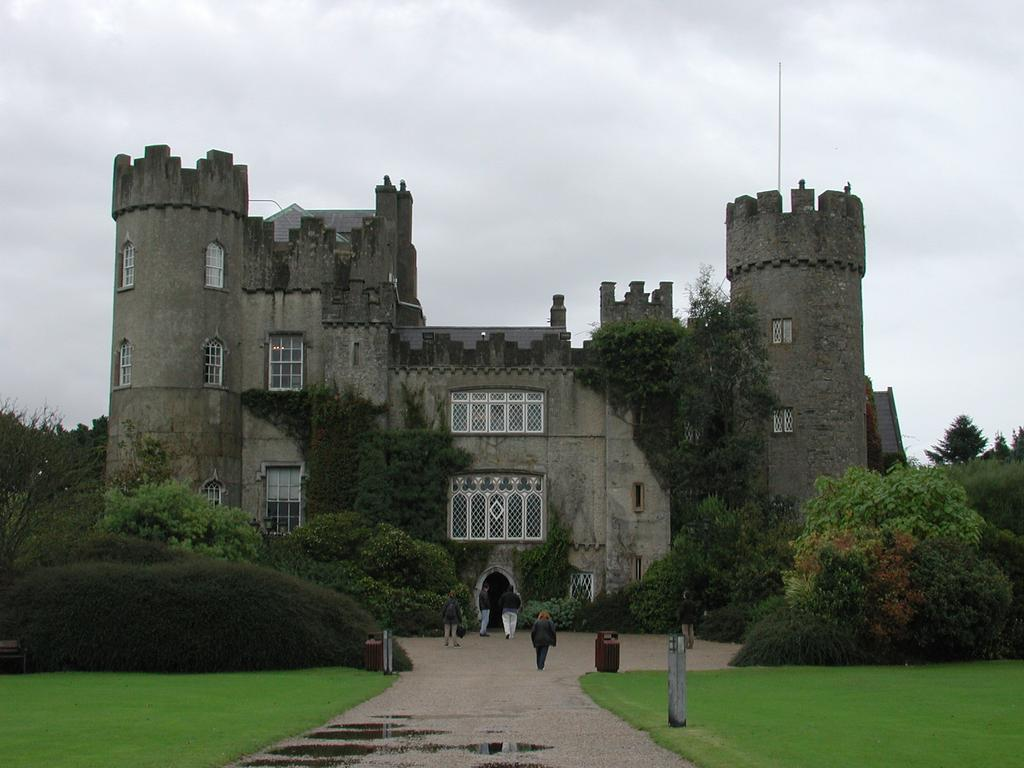
Malahide Castle

== History ==
The Normans arrived from England in 1171. With their superior armour and weapons they quickly captured Dublin, forcing the Danish king, Hamund MacTurkill, to retire to his lands in Kinsaley. From here he endeavoured to mobilise a fleet to recapture Dublin but failed and was subsequently beheaded. Among the invading Normans was Sir Richard de Talbot, a young knight from Shrewsbury but of French descent. He served his master, King Henry II, well in the invasion of Ireland and was rewarded with a grant of lands around Malahide about 1185. In 1475, his descendant had his standing further enhanced when King Edward IV conferred the title ‘Lord High Admiral of Malahide and the Seas Adjoining’ with an entitlement to customs dues. Beginning with a ‘motte and bailey’, a fortified enclosure, at Wheatfield opposite the Community School, the Talbots later built a fortified stone castle beside the nearby ancient church of St. Fenweis. Talbots occupied their castle continuously for eight hundred years except for the period from 1653 to 1660 when John Talbot and his family were sent to Connaught under the notorious ‘To Hell or to Connaught’ edict in Cromwellian times.

The first creation, as Baron Talbot of Malahide, in the County of Dublin, was in the Peerage of Ireland in 1831 for Margaret Talbot, née O'Reilly, the widow of Richard Talbot, heir of the ancient Lords of Malahide. She was succeeded by their eldest son, the second Baron. In 1839 he was created Baron Furnival, of Malahide in the County of Dublin, in the Peerage of the United Kingdom. However, this title became extinct on his death, while he was succeeded in the Irish barony by his younger brother, the third Baron. The latter was succeeded by his son, the fourth Baron. In 1856 he was created Baron Talbot de Malahide, of Malahide in the County of Dublin, in the Peerage of the United Kingdom, and later held office as a government whip in the Liberal administrations of Lord Palmerston and Lord Russell.

When he died the titles passed to his eldest son, the fifth Baron, who married firstly Emily Harriette Boswell (d. 1898) and then Isabel Gurney, an English philanthropist. This line of the family failed on the death in 1948 of the fifth baron's son, the sixth Baron. The peerages were inherited by the late Baron's first cousin, the seventh Baron. He was the son of the Honourable Milo George Talbot, fourth son of the fourth Baron. Lord Talbot de Malahide was a diplomat and notably served as British Ambassador to Laos from 1955 to 1956. However, on his death in 1973 the barony of 1856 became extinct, while the Irish peerage passed to his third cousin, the eighth Baron. He was the second son of John Reginald Charles Talbot, grandson of Admiral The Hon. Sir John Talbot, third son of the first Baroness. When he died the title passed to his younger brother, the ninth Baron. The latter was succeeded by his first cousin once removed, the tenth holder of the title. In turn he was succeeded by his son in 2016.

The 10th Baron Talbot of Malahide was the son of Reginald John Arthur Arundell (who in 1945 assumed by Royal licence the surname and arms of Arundell), eldest son of Reginald Aloysius Talbot (grandson of the aforementioned Admiral the Hon. Sir John Talbot) and his wife, Mabile Mary Arundell, daughter of Hon. Robert Arthur Arundell, fourth son of James Everard Arundell, 9th Baron Arundell of Wardour, and Charlotte Stuart Parkin, youngest daughter of Dr. Henry Parkin, RN, Inspector-General of Hospitals and Fleets. Lord Talbot of Malahide also holds the title Hereditary Lord Admiral of Malahide and Adjacent Seas (created by King Edward IV). His wife Patricia Mary, Lady Talbot of Malahide, is a Dame of the Sovereign Order of Malta.

The Honourable Sir John Talbot, third son of the first Baroness Talbot of Malahide, was a naval commander. The Honourable Thomas Talbot, fourth son of the first Baroness, was a Canadian politician. Two of Lady Talbot of Malahide's brothers are also notable: Hugh O'Reilly took the surname of Nugent and was created a baronet in 1795 (see Nugent baronets), while Andrew O'Reilly was a General der Kavallerie in the Austrian Army and made a Count of the Austrian Empire.

== Baron Talbot of/de Malahide (1831/1856) ==
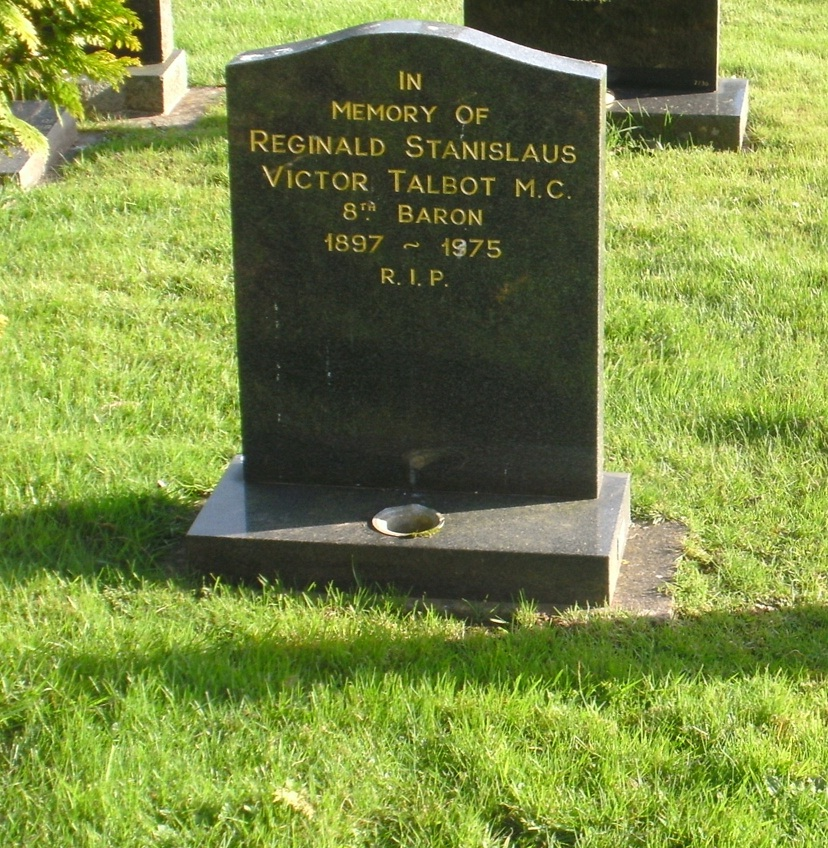
The grave of the 8th Baron (who was married but died without issue) in the cemetery of Brecon, Powys

- Margaret Talbot, 1st Baroness Talbot of Malahide (I) (died 1834)
- Richard Wogan Talbot, 2nd Baron Talbot of Malahide (I), 1st & last Baron Furnival (UK) (1766–1849)
- James Talbot, 3rd Baron Talbot of Malahide (I) (1767–1850)
- James Talbot, 4th Baron Talbot of Malahide (I), 1st Baron Talbot de Malahide (UK) (1805–1883)
- Richard Wogan Talbot, 5th Baron Talbot of Malahide (I), 2nd Baron Talbot de Malahide (UK) (1846–1921)
- James Boswell Talbot, 6th Baron Talbot of Malahide (I), 3rd Baron Talbot de Malahide (UK) (1874–1948)
- Milo John Reginald Talbot, 7th Baron Talbot of Malahide (I), 4th and last Baron Talbot de Malahide (UK) (1912–1973)
- Reginald Stanislaus Victor Talbot, 8th Baron Talbot of Malahide (I) (1897–1975)
- Joseph Hubert George Talbot, 9th Baron Talbot of Malahide (I) (1899–1987)
- (Reginald) John Richard Arundell, 10th Baron Talbot of Malahide (I) (1931–2016)
- Richard John Tennant Arundell, 11th Baron Talbot of Malahide (I) (born 1957)

The heir apparent is the present holder's son, the Hon. John Richard Arundell (born 1998).

=== Title succession chart ===
Title succession chart, Barons and Baronesses Talbot of/de Malahide.

Margaret Talbot; 1st Baroness Talbot of Malahide (née O'Reilly) died 1834
Baron Furnival (UK)
Richard Talbot; 2nd Baron Talbot of Malahide; 1st Baron Furnival; 1766–1849	James Talbot; 3rd Baron Talbot of Malahide; 1767–1850	Adm. Hon. Sir John Talbot; 1768–1851
Furnival barony extinct
Baron Talbot de Malahide (UK)
John Talbot; 1791–1827	James Talbot; 4th Baron Talbot of Malahide; 1st Baron Talbot de Malahide; 1805–1883	Raymond Talbot; 1819–1819	Reginald Talbot; 1826–1906
Richard Talbot; 5th Baron Talbot of Malahide; 1846–1921	Hon. Reginald Talbot; 1849–1930	Hon. James Talbot; 1852–1864	Lt Col. Hon. Milo Talbot; 1854–1931	John Talbot; 1861–1909	Edward Talbot; 1868–1909	Reginald Talbot; 1870–1922
James Talbot; 6th Baron Talbot of Malahide; 1874–1948	Milo Talbot; 7th Baron Talbot of Malahide; 4th Baron Talbot de Malahide; 1912–1973	Francis Talbot; 1889–1957	Reginald Talbot; 8th Baron Talbot of Malahide; 1897–1975	Joseph Talbot; 9th Baron Talbot of Malahide; 1899–1987	Reginald Arundell (né Talbot); 1900–1953
Talbot de Malahide barony extinct
John Arundell; 10th Baron Talbot of Malahide; 1931–2016
Richard Arundell; 11th Baron Talbot of Malahide born 1957
Hon. John Arundell born 1998

== See also ==
- Baron Arundell of Wardour
- Baron Talbot
- Nugent baronets, of Ballinlough
- James Boswell
