= Stonesia =

Scientific classification
- Kingdom: Plantae
- Clade: Tracheophytes
- Clade: Angiosperms
- Clade: Eudicots
- Clade: Rosids
- Order: Malpighiales
- Family: Podostemaceae
- Genus: Stonesia; G.Taylor

Genus of flowering plants

Stonesia is a genus of flowering plants belonging to the family Podostemaceae.

It is native to Guinea and Cameroon.

The genus name of Stonesia is in honour of Margaret Stones (1920 - 2018), an Australian botanical illustrator. It was first described and published in Bull. Brit. Mus. (Nat. Hist.), Bot. Vol.1 on page 59 in 1953.

== Known species ==
According to Kew:

- Stonesia fascicularis G.Taylor
- Stonesia ghoguei E.Pfeifer & Rutish.
- Stonesia gracilis G.Taylor
- Stonesia heterospathella G.Taylor
- Stonesia taylorii C.Cusset
