= Charles Napier (cricketer) =

English cricketer and clergyman

Personal information
- Full name: Charles Walter Albyn Napier
- Born: 28 October 1817; East Pennard, Somerset, England
- Died: 23 December 1908 (aged 91); Chichester, Sussex, England
- Batting: Unknown
- Bowling: Unknown-arm fast
- Relatives: Milo Talbot (nephew)

Domestic team information
- Years: Team
- 1838: Marylebone Cricket Club
- 1838–1839: Oxford University

Career statistics
| Competition | First-class |
|---|---|
| Matches | 8 |
| Runs scored | 120 |
| Batting average | 8.57 |
| 100s/50s | –/– |
| Top score | 21 |
| Catches/stumpings | 2/– |
- Source: Cricinfo, 14 July 2019

Charles Walter Albyn Napier (28 October 1817 – 23 December 1908) was an English first-class cricketer and clergyman.

The son of Gerard Martin Berkely Napier and his wife, Mary Paul Napier, he was born at East Pennard, Somerset. He was educated at Harrow School, before going up to Christ Church, Oxford. While studying at Oxford, he made his debut in first-class cricket for the Marylebone Cricket Club (MCC) against Oxford University at Oxford in 1838, following this up by featuring in the return fixture at Lord's. In the same year he made his debut for Oxford University against Cambridge University, before featuring in three further matches for Oxford in 1839 and obtaining his blue. He also featured for a combined Oxford and Cambridge Universities cricket team against the MCC in 1839. His final first-class appearance came in 1841 for the Fast Bowlers in the Fast v Slow match of 1841 at Lord's.

After graduating from Oxford, he became an Anglican clergyman. He was the vicar of St Peter's Church at Evercreech in 1843, before becoming the rector at Wiston, Sussex. He was later the prebendary of Chichester Cathedral. He died at Chichester in December 1908. His wife, Marianne Flora Etruria Talbot, the daughter of James Talbot, 3rd Baron Talbot of Malahide, predeceased him by 30 years. The couple had two sons. His nephew, Milo Talbot, also played first-class cricket.
