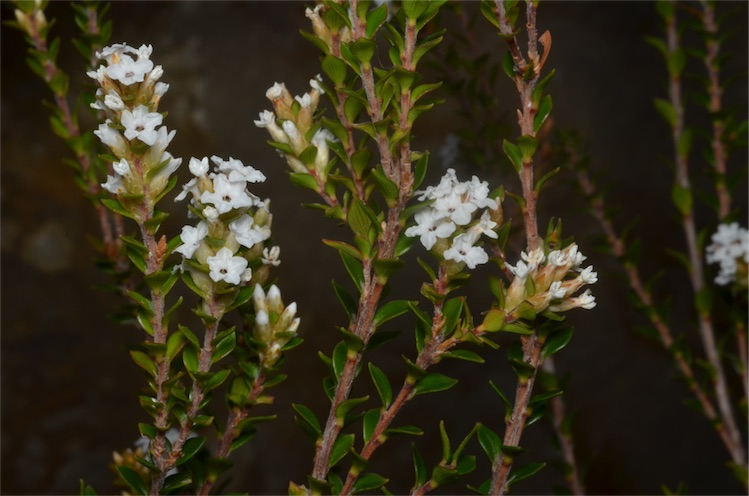
- In the Royal Tasmanian Botanical Gardens

Scientific classification
- Kingdom: Plantae
- Clade: Tracheophytes
- Clade: Angiosperms
- Clade: Eudicots
- Clade: Asterids
- Order: Ericales
- Family: Ericaceae
- Genus: Epacris
- Species: E. curtisiae

Binomial name
- Epacris curtisiae Jarman

= Epacris curtisiae =

Species of flowering plant

Epacris curtisiae is a species of flowering plant in the heath family Ericaceae and is endemic to north-western Tasmania. It is a shrub with egg-shaped to almost circular leaves and tube-shaped white flowers crowded in upper leaf axils.

== Description ==
Epacris curtisiae is a shrub that typically grows to a height of 0.5–2 m (1 ft 8 in – 6 ft 7 in) and has several erect, slender stems. Its leaves are more or less flat, egg-shaped with the narrower end towards the base, to more or less circular, 3–6 mm (0.12–0.24 in) long and 2.5–4.5 mm (0.098–0.177 in) wide on a petiole 0.5–1 mm (0.020–0.039 in) long. The flowers are arranged singly in leaf axils forming clusters 10–50 mm (0.39–1.97 in) long at the ends of branches, each flower on a peduncle 1.0–1.5 mm (0.039–0.059 in) long. The five sepals are egg-shaped to elliptic, 3–4 mm (0.12–0.16 in) long and tinged with pink and the petals are white, joined at the base to form a white tube 2.5–3.5 mm (0.098–0.138 in) long. The five stamens and the style are enclosed within the petal tube.

== Taxonomy and naming ==
Epacris curtisiae was first formally described in 1988 by S. Jean Jarman in the Papers and Proceedings of the Royal Society of Tasmania from specimens collected near the Nelson Bay River in 1985. The specific epithet (curtisiae) honours Winifred Curtis.

== Distribution and habitat ==
This epacris grows in wet heathland at altitudes less than 300 m (980 ft) and is only known from a small rea of north-western Tasmania.
