= David Keenan (musician) =

Irish singer-songwriter

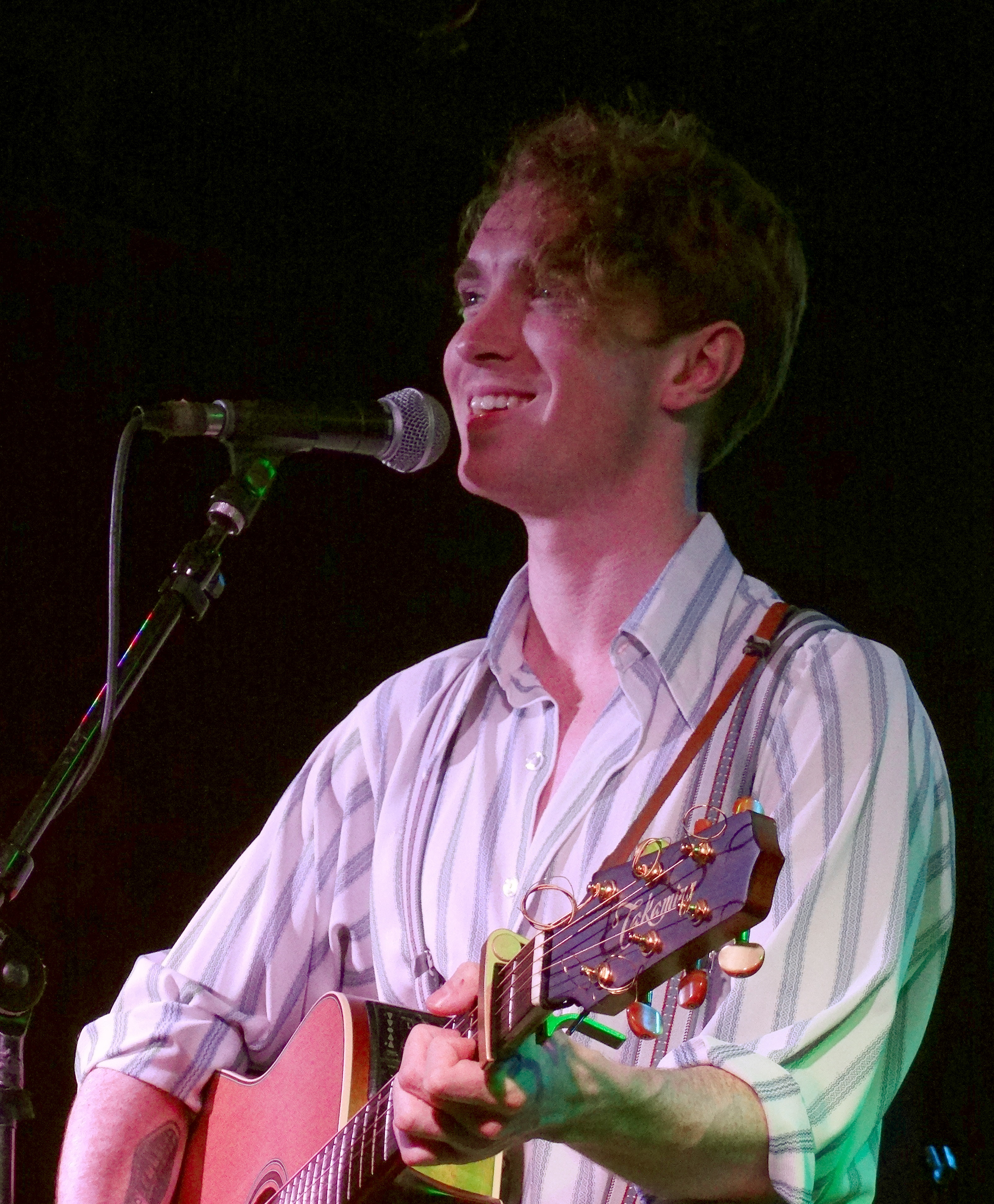

Background information
- Origin: Dundalk, Ireland
- Genres: Folk, poetry, indie, soul
- Occupations: Singer, songwriter, musician
- Years active: 2011–present
- Label: Barrack Street Records
- Website: davidkeenan.com

David Keenan is a singer, songwriter, and musician from Dundalk, County Louth in Ireland.

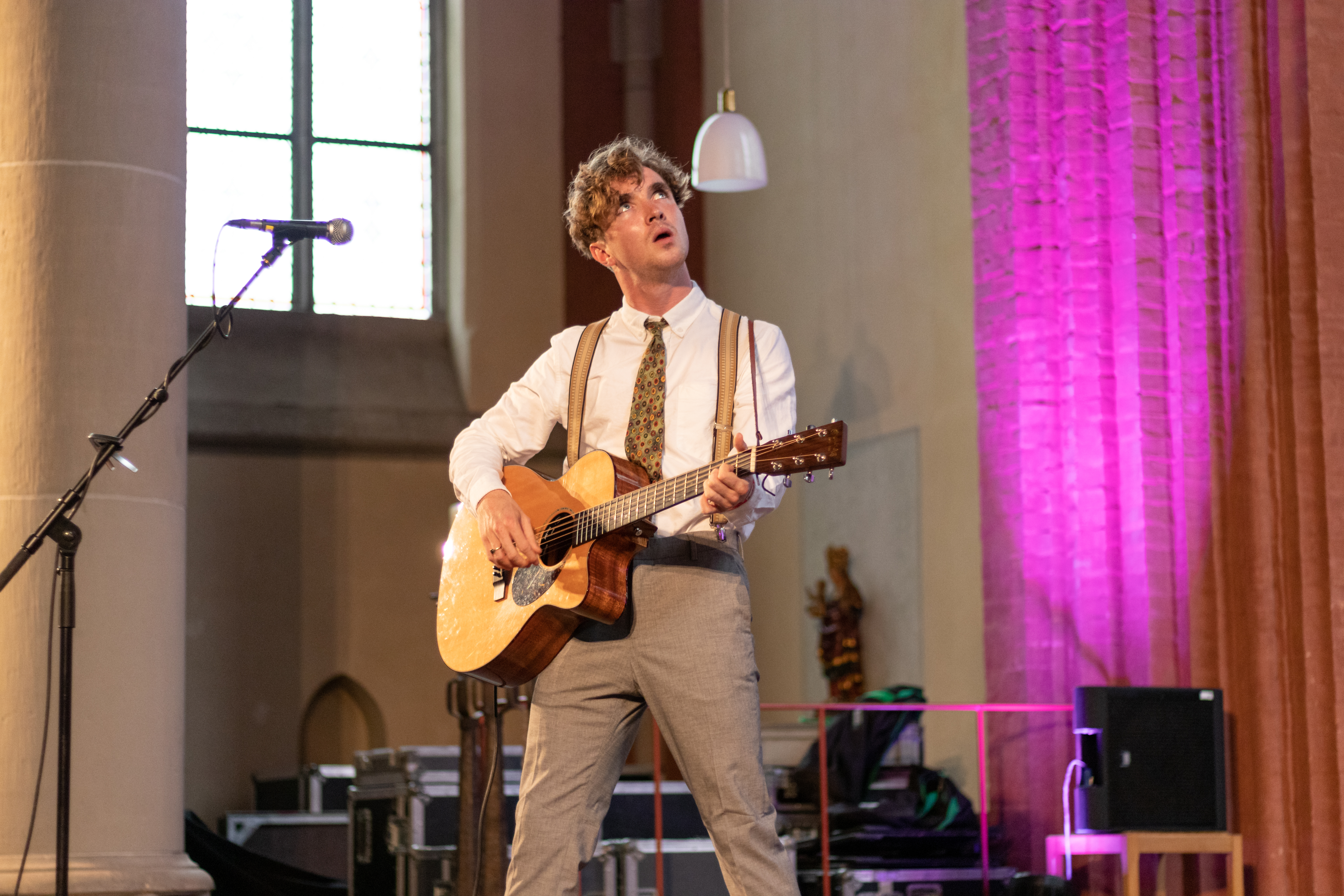
David Keenan in the St Georg Church at Haldern Pop Festival 2019.

== Musical career ==
He played live in Dublin at the start of his career, while releasing EPs through his own label, Barrack Street Records. These EPs were Cobwebs, Strip Me Bare, Strip Me Bare Vol. 2, and Evidence of Living (2018). In September 2019 Keenan signed with Irish independent label Rubyworks Records before the release of A Beginner's Guide to Bravery, which reached number 1 in the Independent charts and was the biggest-selling vinyl record in the country during the week of its release in January 2020. It was described as "a remarkable record" by NPR.

Keenan published his first collection of poetry, Soundings of an Unnamed Bird, in 2020

His second album, What Then? was released in October 2021. The first single from the album, "Bark", was released on 10 June 2021, followed by "Sentimental Dole" on 16 July, "What Then Cried Jo Soap" on 19 August of the same year. To promote the album, Keenan toured the United States with Rodrigo y Gabriela in September 2021.

== Discography ==
=== Studio albums ===
Title	Album details	Peak chart positions
Title	Album details	IRL
A Beginner's Guide to Bravery	Released: 10 January 2020; Label: Rubyworks; Formats: Digital download, CD, streaming, vinyl	1
What Then?	Released: 15 October 2021; Label: Rubyworks; Formats: Digital download, CD, streaming, vinyl	
Crude	Released: 11 November 2022; Label: Barrack Street Records; Formats: Digital download, CD, streaming, vinyl	29
Dundalk to Dublin	Released: 24 July 2026	

=== Extended plays ===
Title	EP details
Cobwebs	Released: 23 March 2017; Label: Barrack Street; Formats: Digital download
Strip Me Bare Vol.1	Released: 3 January 2018; Label: Barrack Street; Formats: Digital download, CD
Strip Me Bare Vol.2	Released: 17 March 2018; Label: Barrack Street; Formats: Digital download, CD
Evidence of Living	Released: 7 December 2018; Label: Barrack Street; Formats: Digital download, vinyl
Snakes & Ladders/Full Stop	Released: 13 February 2020; Label: Barrack Street; Formats: Digital download, vinyl
