= Milo Talbot (British Army officer) =

First-class cricketer and army officer

Lieutenant-Colonel The Honourable Milo George Talbot
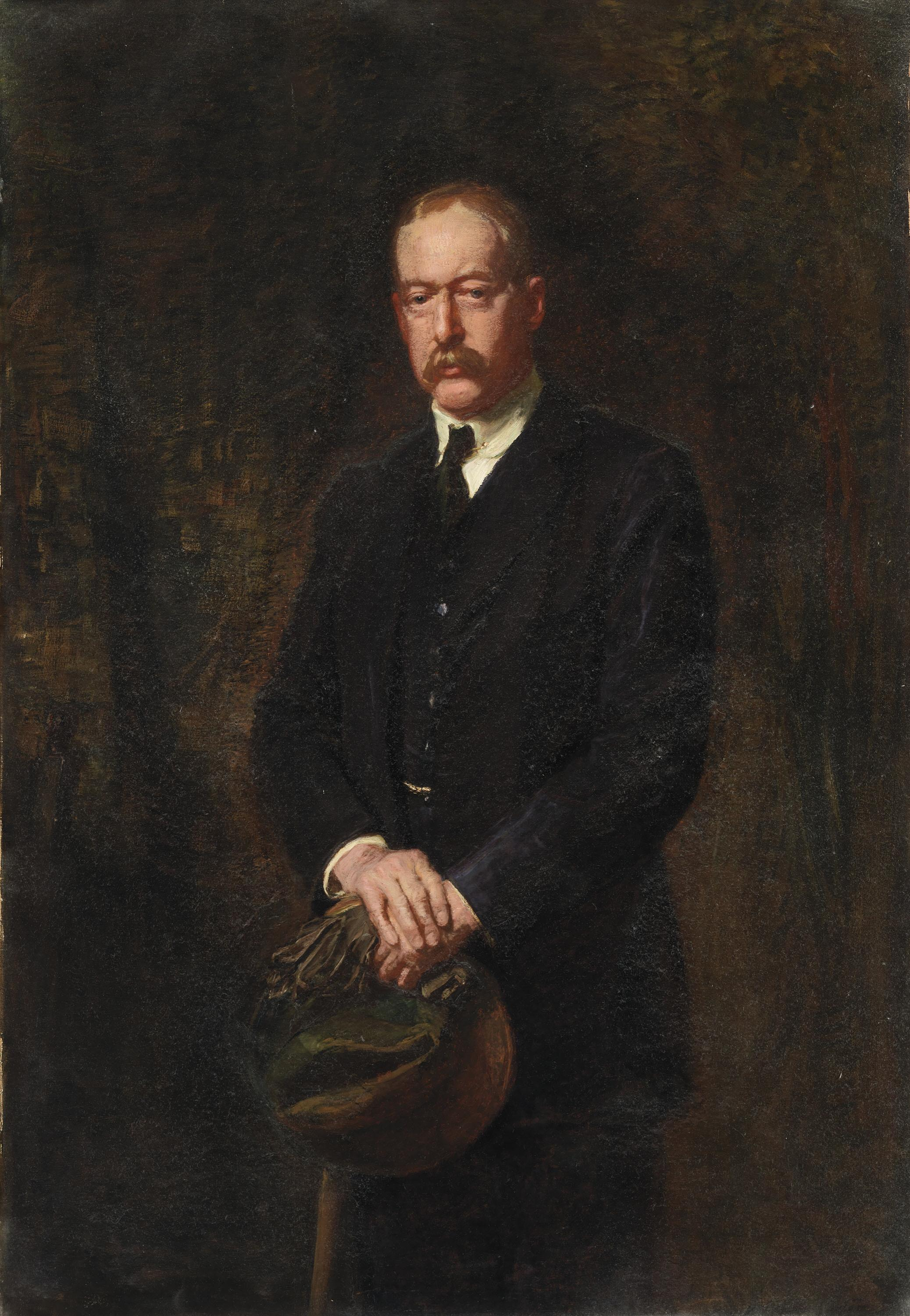
- Portrait of Lt. Col. Talbot, which hangs in Malahide Castle in the north of County Dublin.
- Born: 14 September 1854; Malahide, Ireland
- Died: 3 September 1931 (aged 76); Patrixbourne, Kent, England
- Military career
- Allegiance: United Kingdom
- Branch: British Army; Egyptian Army (secondment)
- Service years: 1873–1916
- Rank: Lieutenant colonel (British Army); Major general (Egyptian Army)
- Unit: Royal Engineers
- Conflicts: Second Anglo-Afghan War; Mahdist War; First World War
- Awards: Order of the Bath; Order of Osmanieh (3rd Class); Order of the Medjidie (2nd Class)

Lieutenant-Colonel The Hon. Milo George Talbot (14 September 1854 – 3 September 1931), CB, was an Anglo-Irish aristocrat and a British Army officer. The fourth son of the 4th Baron Talbot of Malahide, he was born into an Anglo-Irish family and attended Wellington College and the Royal Military Academy, Woolwich, before being commissioned as an officer in the British Army's Royal Engineers. He played a single match of first-class cricket as a young man for the Gentlemen of the South against the Players of the North. Talbot served on the staff of General Ross during the Second Anglo-Afghan War and remained in that country as a member of the Afghan Boundary Commission. He returned to Britain as a staff officer before returning to active duty during the Anglo-Egyptian conquest of the Sudan. During this time, he was present at the Battle of Omdurman in September 1898 and served on secondment to the Egyptian Army as a Major-General. Talbot retired in 1905, but was recalled to duty during the First World War, when he gave advice on plans for the Gallipoli Campaign and the defence of the Anglo-Egyptian Sudan.

== Early life and cricket career ==
The fourth son of the 4th Baron Talbot of Malahide and his wife, Maria Margaretta Murray, Talbot was born at Malahide Castle in the north of County Dublin in September 1854. He was educated in England at Wellington College. Talbot made one appearance in first-class cricket for the Gentlemen of the South against the Players of the North at Chelsea in 1875. Batting twice in the match, Talbot was dismissed for a single run in the South's first-innings by Fred Morley, while in their second-innings he was dismissed without scoring by the same bowler.

== Military career ==
=== Afghanistan ===
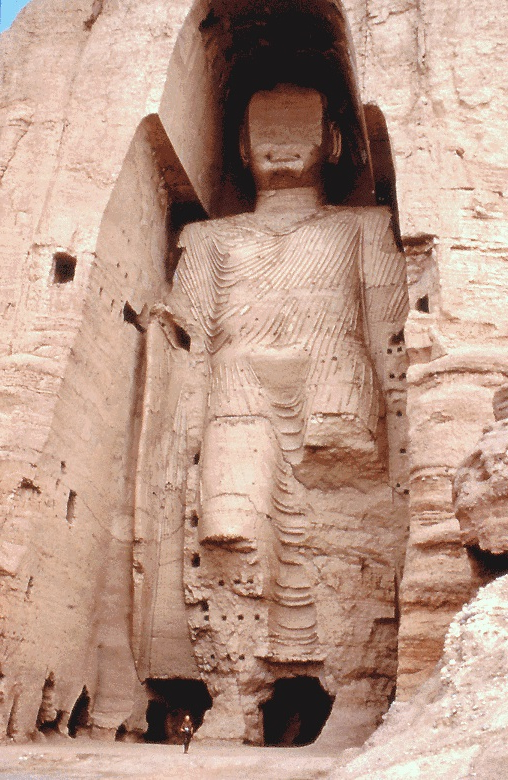
One of the Buddhas of Bamiyan

Talbot attended the Royal Military Academy, Woolwich, as a gentleman cadet and on 29 October 1873 was appointed to the temporary rank of lieutenant in the Royal Engineers. He gained that rank permanently in August 1876. Talbot served in the Second Anglo-Afghan War (1878–1880) on the staff of Major-General Sir Frederick Roberts, and was mentioned in dispatches by him after the Battle of Kandahar. Talbot joined the Afghan Boundary Commission as a surveyor in 1884. He was promoted to the rank of captain in January 1885 and to the brevet rank of major in February 1887, in recognition of his service with the commission.

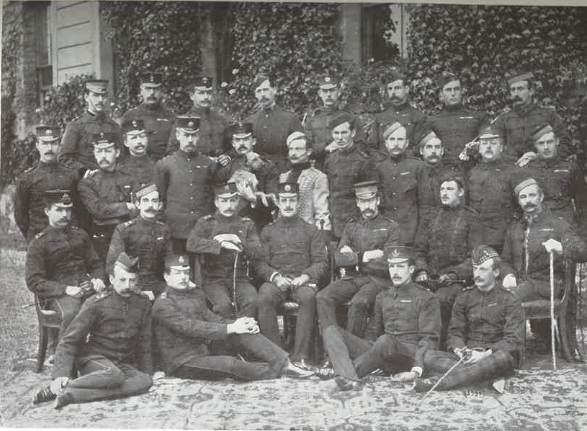
The Staff College, Camberley, class in 1890. Stood in the third row, fifth from the left, is Lieutenant Colonel M. G. Talbot.

Talbot was commended for his diligent surveying work in cold conditions over rough terrain. It was also noted that, despite being of the noblest blood of any of the surveyors, he did not rely on his aristocratic rank and, when one of his colleagues fell ill in the field, he tended to him as a nurse. Talbot's work included a survey of the Buddhas of Bamiyan in the Emirate of Afghanistan. He donated a rare 10th-century Afghan dirham to the British Museum.

=== Sudan ===
On 15 November 1892, Talbot was appointed a staff officer at army headquarters and he became Deputy Assistant Adjutant General on 1 September 1895, holding that position for two years. Between 1897 and 1899, Talbot served on the staff of General Kitchener during the Anglo-Egyptian conquest of the Sudan. He was mentioned in dispatches in September 1898 by Kitchener for his actions at the Battle of Omdurman. He later served on secondment to the Egyptian Army (as a major-general) and was promoted to brevet lieutenant-colonel in the British Army on 15 November 1898. On 1 March 1900, Talbot was granted the substantive rank of lieutenant-colonel; this was later antedated to 18 February 1900.

In 1900, Talbot was appointed Director of Surveys in the Anglo-Egyptian Sudan. On 2 August 1900, he was granted permission by Queen Victoria to accept an appointment as a third class member of the Ottoman Order of Osmanieh. He received promotion to the brevet rank of colonel on 29 November 1900, later antedated to 6 January 1900. On 21 December 1903, he was authorised to accept appointment to the second class of the Ottoman Order of the Medjidieh. Talbot was placed on half pay from 1 January 1905 having reached the limit of five years in rank as a lieutenant-colonel and retired from the army on 22 April. At some point after this, he served as military attaché to the British legation at Brussels.

=== First World War ===
Shortly after the outbreak of the First World War, he was recalled to service for special duties at the War Office as a General Staff Officer of the 1st grade, with effect from 22 September 1914. Talbot, with Major-General Charles Edward Callwell, Captain Cecil Lambert, Captain Herbert Richmond and the Admiralty's Director of Transport, Graeme Thompson, was part of a committee put together in September 1914 to plan for a naval landing at Gallipoli. Talbot recorded that Callwell considered it was "likely to prove an extremely difficult operation of war" but thought a force of sixty thousand men could prevail. Callwell had previously been against such an operation and may well have been persuaded to change his mind by Winston Churchill's force of will. Talbot had returned to the retired list by 14 January 1916 when he was appointed a Companion of the Order of the Bath (CB). He assisted General Sir Reginald Wingate, Governor-General of the Anglo-Egyptian Sudan, with preparations for the defence of that country as a member of the Permanent Committee of Defence in 1916.

== Personal life ==
Talbot was married to Eva Joicey. Their son, Milo John Reginald Talbot, later succeeded as the 7th Baron Talbot of Malahide in 1948. Talbot died 3 September 1931. The chapel of the former British residency at Khartoum has a plaque in his memory. His uncle, Charles Napier, also played first-class cricket.
