= Rose Maud Talbot =

Irish farmer and philanthropist (1915–2009)

The Honourable Rose Maud Talbot
- Talbot in 2009
- Born: 14 September 1915; Hartham Park
- Died: 15 February 2009 (aged 93); Tasmania
- Known for: philanthropy

Hon. Rose Maud Talbot (14 September 1915 – 15 February 2009) was an English-born Irish farmer and philanthropist, who emigrated to Tasmania, Australia.

== Life ==
Talbot was born in the large country house of Hartham Park, Wiltshire, England. Her mother was Eva Joicey and her father was Lieutenant-Colonel Hon. Milo Talbot. Her grandfather was the 4th Baron Talbot of Malahide. When she was five, her family moved to another large house, Bifrons Park, near Canterbury in Kent. She was educated nearby, but she was not expected to have a career.

In 1948, her brother, Milo, succeeded as the 7th Baron Talbot of Malahide, inheriting the family estates in Ireland, which included Malahide Castle in the north of County Dublin. Lord Talbot of Malahide frequently moved around as he served with His (and later Her) Majesty's Diplomatic Service, so Rose became the resident overseer at Malahide Castle. In 1949, King George VI issued a Royal Warrant of Precedence declaring that Rose would be given the rank of the daughter of a baron, even though her father had not lived long enough to inherit the title; this allowed her to be styled as 'The Honourable'. When her brother, Lord Talbot of Malahide, retired, they fell out and she moved out of Malahide Castle. She lived in Dublin instead, where she became the Secretary of the Soldiers, Sailors, Airmen and Families Association (SSAFA), which helped Irish people who had served with the British Armed Forces to return and live in Ireland.

Her brother, Lord Talbot of Malahide, was interested in stamps and plants. He had inherited a large farm in Tasmania that had been established in the 1870s by Thomas Lister Ingham. When he was asked if he would sell it, he went to see the property in 1952. He decided to keep it and he spent money to bring it back to be serviceable. Rose visited with him in 1955. He had an art gallery installed, and he sent back botanical specimens to the gardens at Malahide Castle from his travels.

Her brother decided to commission a flora of Tasmania. He died when he was 60, while cruising around the Greek islands, in 1973. This created an enormous problem as his property made the family liable to large death duties in the Republic of Ireland and it was Rose who inherited the estate, and the problem. She would have liked to have given valuables from the castle to the Irish State but the government would only accept property or money. She caused some controversy when she sold important furnishings to raise the money to pay the debts. She lived at the castle for three years before she ended the family's long association with the castle and gifted it to the Irish state.

Talbot moved to Tasmania where she took over the farm. She continued her brother's interest in botany and she paid for the completion of the six volume The Endemic Flora of Tasmania.

Rose Talbot died in Tasmania on 15 February 2009.
