= Malahide Castle =

Castle and demesne by the village of Malahide, County Dublin

Coordinates: 53°26′41″N 6°9′54″W

External 3D model
- 3D model of Malahide Castle (linked at Sketchfab).

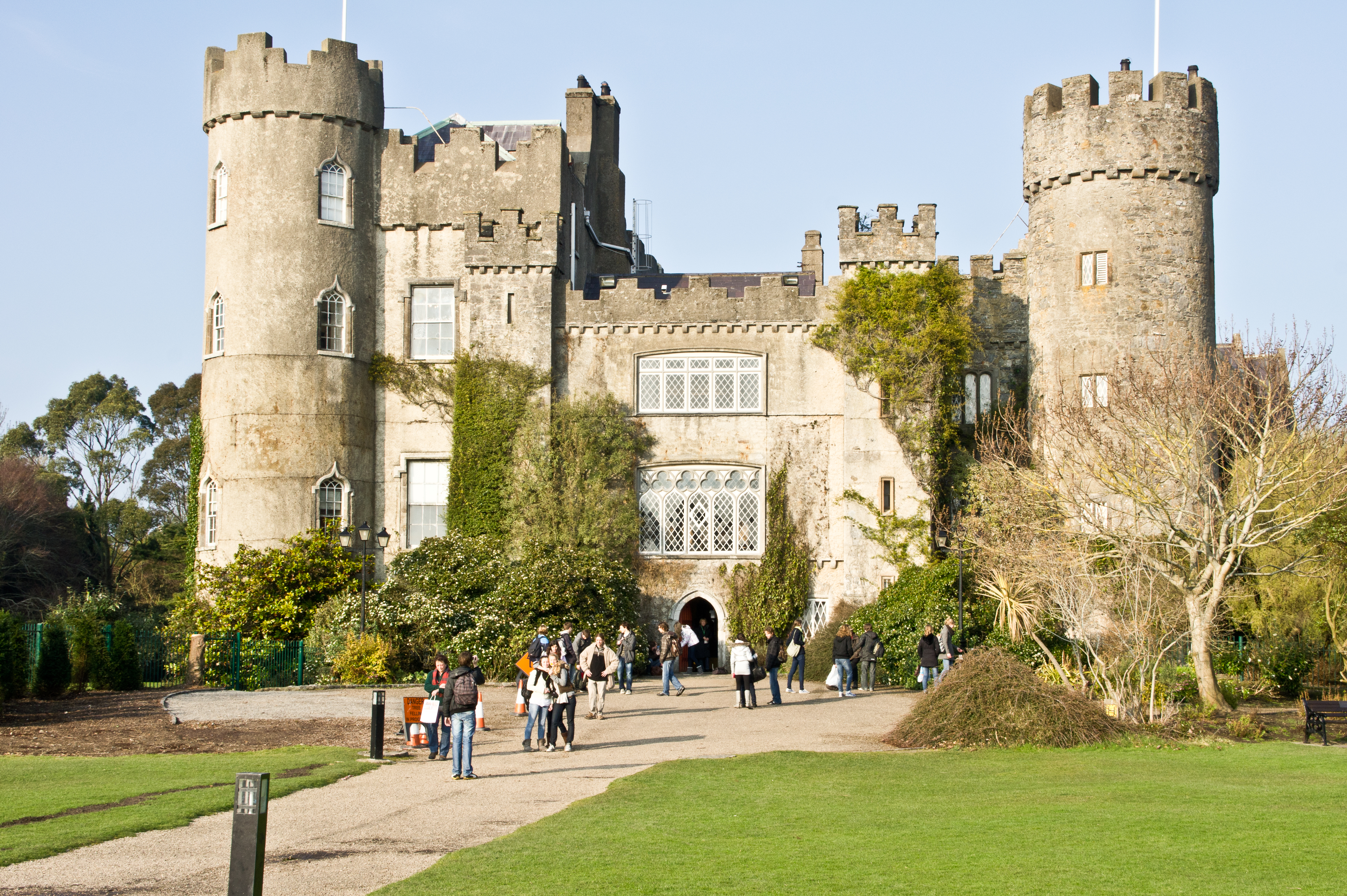
Malahide Castle

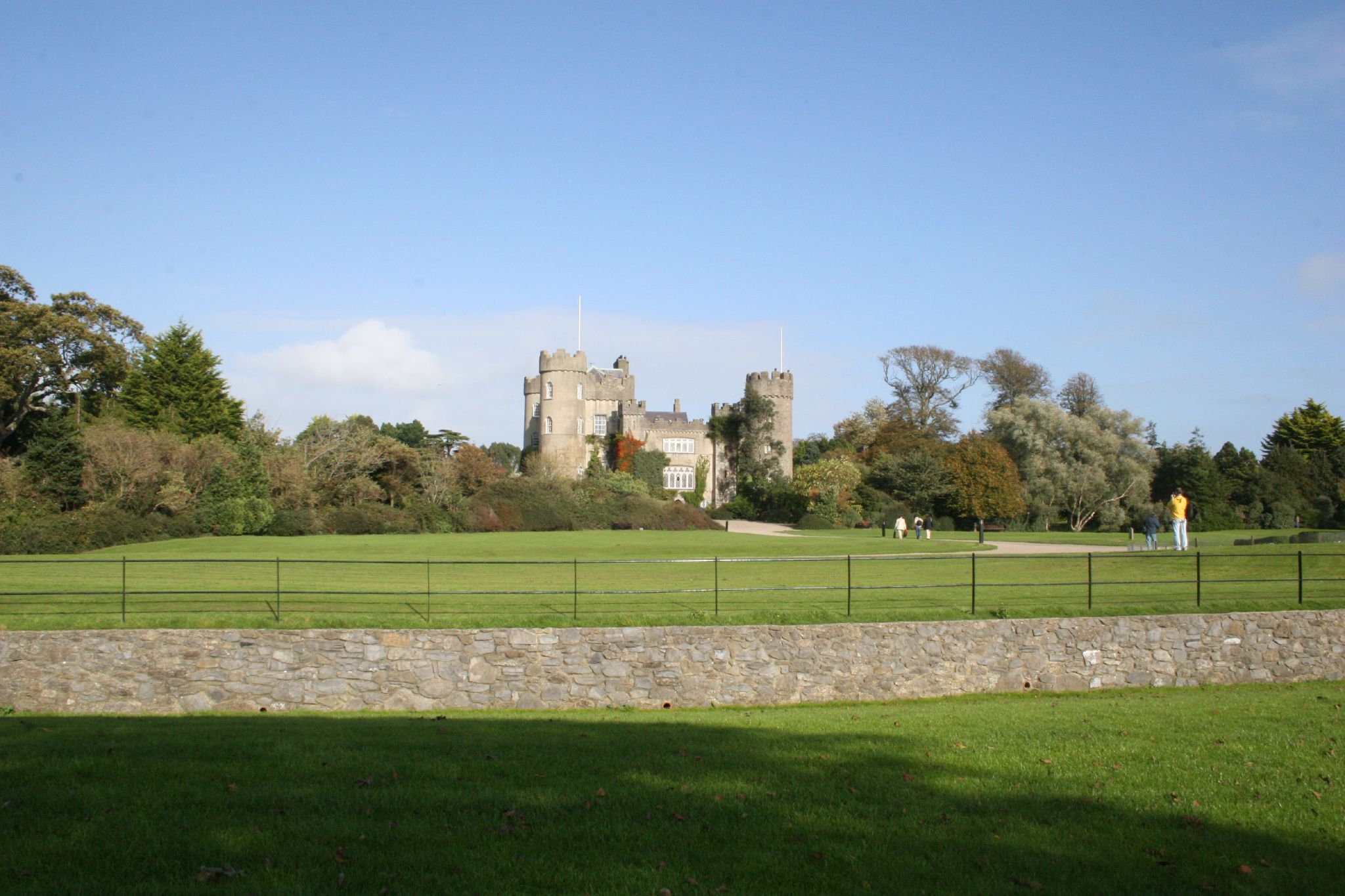
Malahide Castle with ornamental ha-ha in front

Malahide Castle (Irish: Caisleán Mhullach Íde), parts of which date to the 12th century, lies close to the village of Malahide, 14 km (nine miles) north of central Dublin in Ireland. It has over 267 acres (1.08 km^{2}) of remaining parkland estate, forming the Malahide Demesne Regional Park.

== History ==
The estate began in 1185, when Richard Talbot, a knight who accompanied Henry II to Ireland in 1174, was granted the "lands and harbour of Malahide." The oldest parts of the castle date back to the 12th century and it was home to the Talbot family for 791 years, from 1185 until 1976, the only exception being the period from 1649 to 1660, when Oliver Cromwell granted it to Miles Corbet after the Cromwellian conquest of Ireland; Corbet was hanged following the demise of Cromwell, and the castle was restored to the Talbots. The building was notably enlarged in the reign of Edward IV, with towers added in 1765.

The estate survived such losses as the Battle of the Boyne, when fourteen members of the owner's family sat down to breakfast in the Great Hall, and all were dead by evening, and the penal laws, even though the family remained Roman Catholic until 1774.

In 1918, during the First World War, a mooring-out base for airships was established in the grounds of the castle, used by airships from RNAS Anglesey in Wales which conducted anti-submarine operations in the Irish Sea. There were plans to base airships in the castle grounds from 1919, but they were abandoned at the end of the war.

In the 1920s, the private papers of James Boswell were discovered in the castle and sold to American collector Ralph H. Isham by Boswell's great-great-grandson Lord Talbot de Malahide. The papers have since passed to Yale University, which has published popular and scholarly editions of his journals and correspondence. Soon after, a second cache was discovered and also purchased by Isham.

Malahide Castle and its demesne was eventually inherited by the 7th Baron Talbot who had wanted to donate it to the state. On his death in 1973, the castle passed to his sister, Rose, who had lived there as a caretaker in the 1950s. She had death duties to pay, and the government would not accept valuables, so they had to be sold. In 1975, Rose ceded the castle to the Irish State, with regret, to fund the outstanding inheritance taxes. Many of the contents, notably furnishings, which had been sold, had caused some controversy. Private and government parties were able to retrieve some from the purchasers.

== Visiting ==
The castle, along with its subsidiary attractions, was for many years operated as a tourist attraction by Dublin Tourism, working with Fingal County Council, which owns the whole demesne. The castle's courtyard visitor centre features an expansive retail store, food market, and café operated by the Irish lifestyle brand Avoca..

The castle itself can be visited for a fee, on a guided-tour-only basis. In addition, it is possible to hire the famously Gothic Great Hall for private banquets. The castle's best-known rooms are the Oak Room, and the Great Hall, which displays Talbot family history. In the courtyard behind the castle are a café and craft shop, and other retail facilities.

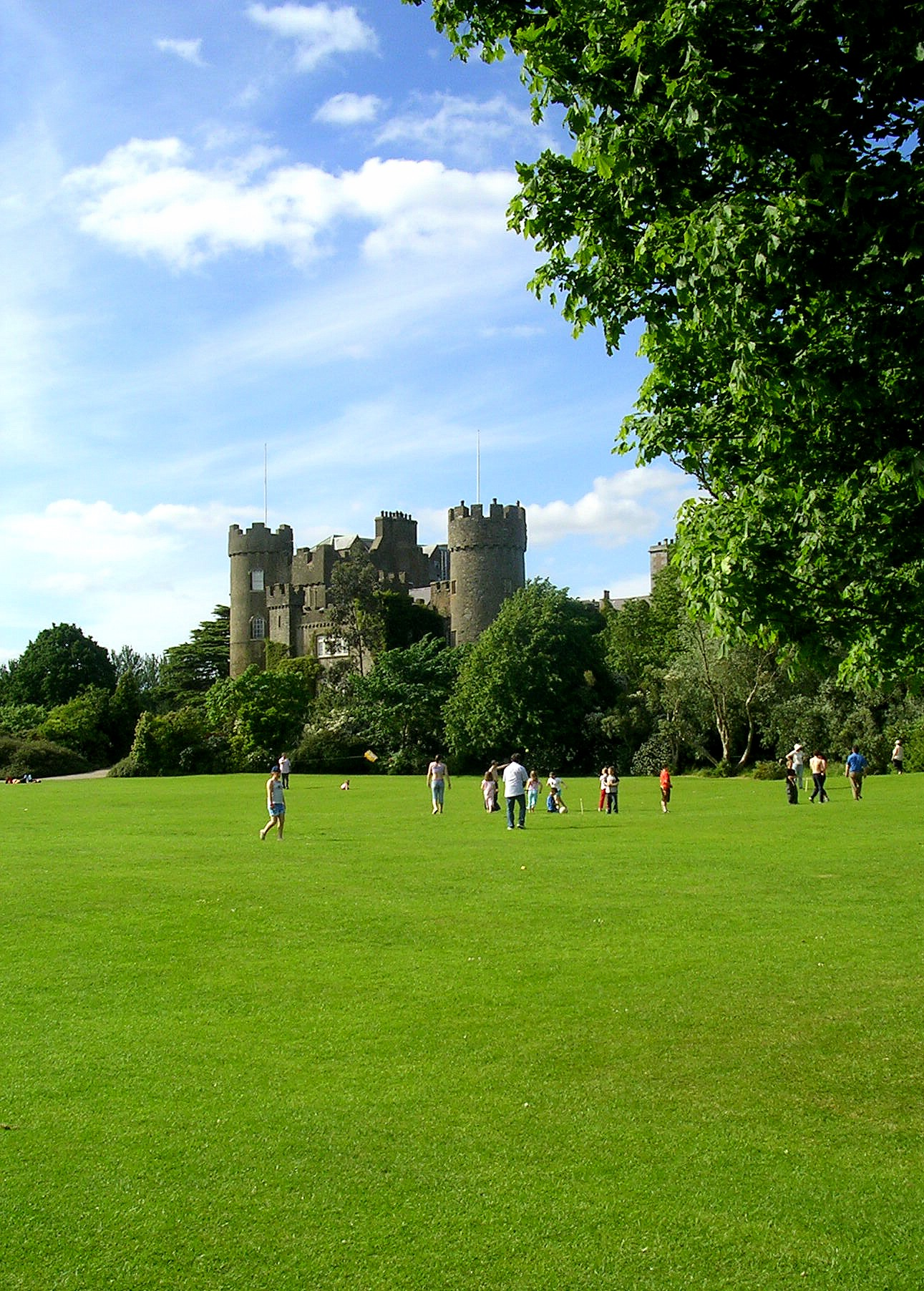
Malahide Castle stands within an extensive demesne

The Talbot Botanic Gardens, situated behind the castle, comprises several hectares of plants and lawns, a walled garden of 1.6 hectares and seven glasshouses, including a Victorian conservatory. Many plants from the southern hemisphere, notably Chile and Australia, are featured. The gardens showcase the plant-collecting passion of the 7th Lord Talbot of Malahide in the mid-20th Century.

The demesne is one of few surviving examples of 18th-century landscaped parks and has wide lawns surrounded by a protective belt of trees. It can be visited freely, with a number of entrances and car parking areas.

In addition to woodland walks, and a marked "exercise trail," the park features sports grounds, including a cricket pitch and several football pitches, a 9-hole par-3 golf course, an 18-hole pitch-and-putt course, tennis courts and a boules area.

Adjacent to the golfing facilities, and containing access to them, is a pavilion which also contains a café and other facilities.

There is an extensive children's playground near the castle.

A seasonal road train operates in a loop from the vicinity of the castle to the railway station and back. A Malahide Castle and coastal tour bus begins its journeys in Malahide Castle and continues to Howth, with two daily departures.

=== Former exhibits ===
Two major exhibits were required to move away from the demesne in 2010–2011, as the park was prepared for a relaunch under new management. One reopened in 2011, and the other, after many delays, in 2020:

- Tara's Palace Museum of Childhood was formerly located at Malahide Castle, but relocated to Powerscourt Estate near Enniskerry in 2011.
- The Fry Model Railway was located at Malahide Castle from 1988 to 2010. After many delays, it re-opened in 2020 at the restored Casino House, a former shooting lodge of the Talbot de Malahide family, located near the railway station.

== Cricket ==
The cricket venue is located in the Lady Acre field and is home to Malahide Cricket Club. It also attracts international fixtures with teams such as Australia, England and Pakistan. In September 2013 using temporary grandstands and hospitality pavilions over 10,000 spectators were accommodated, a record for the Island of Ireland.

== Access ==
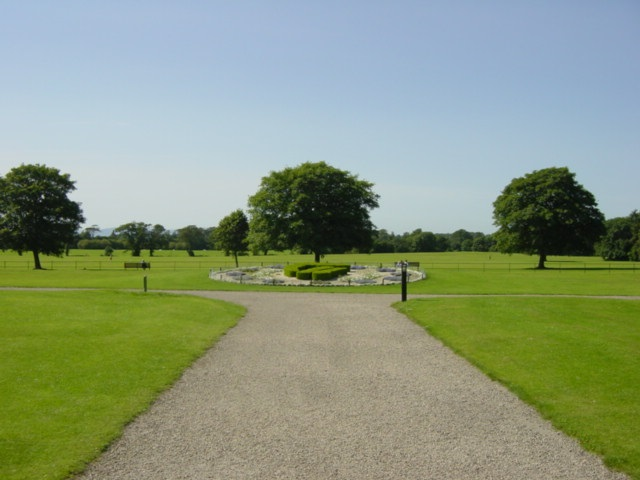
The Park at Malahide Castle

The main entrance to the demesne is off the Malahide Road, with access also possible from Malahide village. Dublin Bus route numbers 42, 102 and 142 lie along one side of the park, and Malahide Railway Station is near the castle end of the park.

== Concert venue ==
The grounds at Malahide Castle were opened as a new concert venue by Fingal County Council in summer 2007, with concerts by Arctic Monkeys, Pink, Joe Cocker, Al Green and Bell X1 amongst others. In 2008 performers included Neil Young, Radiohead, and Eric Clapton. Prince performed at the Castle on 30 July 2011.

In the summer of 2017 two more bands played at the venue, with a capacity of 20,000 people. The band Arcade Fire brought their 'Everything Now' tour to the venue. The next day, The 1975 performed.

More artists played the grounds in June 2018, including Chic featuring Nile Rodgers, Liam Gallagher, Gorillaz, Kodaline, and LCD soundsystem.

June 2019 saw more artists perform in the venue, over a longer period of time compared to previous years. Snow Patrol were followed by The Cure the following day, and Mumford & Sons performed on both the Friday and Saturday of the second weekend, with Noel Gallagher's High Flying Birds playing on Sunday. George Ezra performed on the Friday of the third and final weekend, with Lana Del Rey playing on the Saturday. In June 2023, a Depeche Mode concert took place.

=== Concert history ===
Concerts held at Malahide Castle Gardens
Year	Date	Headliner	Supporting Acts	Attendance	Box Office
2005
2005	17 July	Andrea Bocelli	—N/a	8,105 / 8,105	$1,022,054
2007
2007	16 June	Arctic Monkeys	Supergrass; The Coral; Delorentos; Boss Volenti	—N/a	—N/a
2007	17 June	Arctic Monkeys	Supergrass; The Coral; Delorentos; Boss Volenti	—N/a	—N/a
2007	22 June	P!nk	The Coronas	—N/a	—N/a
2007	23 June	P!nk	The Coronas	—N/a	—N/a
2007	1 July	Al Green; Joe Cocker	—N/a	—N/a	—N/a
2008
2008	6 June	Radiohead	Bat For Lashes	—N/a	—N/a
2008	7 June	Radiohead	Bat For Lashes	—N/a	—N/a
2008	21 June	Eric Clapton	—N/a	19,301 / 20,000	$2,257,392
2008	29 June	Neil Young	The Frames; Everest	20,000 / 20,000	$2,369,865
2009
2009	16 June	Arctic Monkeys	—N/a	—N/a	—N/a
2011
2011	30 July	Prince	—N/a	—N/a	—N/a
2017
2017	14 June	Arcade Fire	—N/a	—N/a	—N/a
2017	17 June	The 1975	The Blizzards; Pale Waves	—N/a	—N/a
2018
2018	5 June	LCD Soundsystem	Lykke Li	—N/a	—N/a
2018	8 June	Kodaline	All Tvvins	—N/a	—N/a
2018	9 June	De La Soul	Hypnotic Brass Ensemble; Gorillaz; Little Simz	—N/a	—N/a
2018	15 June	Liam Gallagher	—N/a	—N/a	—N/a
2018	16 June	Chic feat. Nile Rodgers	—N/a	—N/a	—N/a
2019
2019	7 June	Snow Patrol	The Kooks; Gabrielle Aplin; David Keenan	—N/a	—N/a
2019	20 June	The Cure	Ride; The Twilight Sad	—N/a	—N/a
2019	14 June	Mumford & Sons	Dermot Kennedy; Wild Youth; Aurora	—N/a	—N/a
2019	15 June	Mumford & Sons	Dermot Kennedy; Wild Youth; Aurora	—N/a	—N/a
2019	16 June	Noel Gallagher's High Flying Birds	Doves; Blossoms; DMA's; Inhaler	—N/a	—N/a
2019	17 June	Snow Patrol	The Kooks; Gabrielle Aplin; David Keenan	—N/a	—N/a
2019	21 June	George Ezra	The Vaccines; KAWALA	—N/a	—N/a
2019	22 June	Lana Del Rey	—N/a	—N/a	—N/a
2020
2020	20 June	Lewis Capaldi	—N/a	—N/a	—N/a
2021
2021	26 June	Picture This	—N/a	—N/a	—N/a
2022
2022	14 June	The Killers	Blossoms; The Academic	—N/a	—N/a
2022	15 June	The Killers	Blossoms; The Academic	—N/a	—N/a
2022	17 June	Kodaline	—N/a	—N/a	—N/a
2022	18 June	Picture This	The Vamps; Moncrieff; Lea Heart	—N/a	—N/a
2022	19 June	Gerry Cinnamon	—N/a	—N/a	—N/a
2022	24 June	Dermot Kennedy	James Vincent McMorrow; Sarcastic Sounds	—N/a	—N/a
2022	25 June	Lewis Capaldi	—N/a	—N/a	—N/a
2023
2023	14 June	Depeche Mode	Young Fathers; Just Mustard	24,475 / 24,475	$2,982,689
2023	16 June	Paolo Nutini	Julia Jacklin; NewDad	—N/a	—N/a
2023	24 June	Blur	Self Esteem; Sounds Mint	—N/a	—N/a
2023	25 June	Sam Fender	Rachel Chinouriri	—N/a	—N/a
2023	27 June	Florence and the Machine	CMAT; Nell Mescal	—N/a	—N/a
2023	28 June	Sting; Blondie	Lyra; Joe Sumner	—N/a	—N/a
2023	30 June	Hozier	The Teskey Brothers; Allison Russell	—N/a	—N/a
2024
2024	21 June	Take That	Olly Murs	—N/a	—N/a
2024	28 June	Shania Twain	Rag'n'Bone Man	—N/a	—N/a
2024	6 July	Nicki Minaj	Pink Friday 2 Tour	—N/a	—N/a
2025
2025	29 June	Alanis Morissette	Liz Phair; Irish Women in Harmony	—N/a	—N/a
2025	26 July	Neil Young	Van Morrison	—N/a	—N/a
2026
2026	30 June	Maroon 5	Jess Glynne; Voilà	—N/a	—N/a

== World Scout Moot ==
The grounds of the castle were to have been the base camp of the 16th World Scout Moot, to be hosted by Scouting Ireland in July and August 2021. The event was cancelled due to the COVID-19 pandemic.

== See also ==
- Baron Talbot of Malahide
- Thomas Talbot
- List of tourist attractions in Ireland
