= Winifred Curtis =

British–Australian botanist

Winifred Curtis AM
- Born: 15 June 1905; London, England, United Kingdom
- Died: 14 October 2005 (aged 100); Hobart, Tasmania, Australia
- Citizenship: Australian
- Education: University College London
- Scientific career
- Fields: Botany
- Workplaces: University of Tasmania
- Author abbrev. (botany): W.M.Curtis

Winifred Mary Curtis AM (15 June 1905 – 14 October 2005) was a British-born Australian botanist, author and a pioneer researcher in plant embryology and cytology who played a prominent role in the department of botany at the University of Tasmania (UTAS), where the main plant science laboratory is named in her honour.

== Biography ==
Curtis was born on 15 June 1905 in London, the only child of Herbert John Curtis and Elizabeth Winifred Curtis (née Baker).

Curtis lived in India for several years as a child after her father was posted there. She was a gifted student, and studied science at University College, London from 1924, winning various awards and scholarships. She graduated in 1927 and completed an honours degree in Botany the following year for research on Spartinia townsendii, and Taraxacum (dandelions). This was followed by several years of travel through Europe and teaching in Manchester and Hampstead.

In 1939 she emigrated to Australia with her family on the TSS Ascania where she initially took a teaching position as Science Mistress at the private girls' school Fahan School in Hobart. She later joined the Department of Biology at the University of Tasmania and took part in the creation of the Department of Botany there in 1945. In 1943 she started work on The Students' Flora of Tasmania, a well known work on Tasmanian flora. The first volume was published in 1956; the fifth and final volume was published in 1994, more than 50 years after its commencement. From the early 1960s, much of this was a close scientific collaboration with botanist and plant collector Dennis Ivor Morris (1924–2005) with whom she also shared a close friendship.

In 1944 Curtis published Variations in Pultenaea juniperina, the first record of polyploidy in an Australian native plant. This led to her PhD from London University which was awarded in 1950. Her doctoral thesis was titled Studies in Experimental Taxonomy and Variation in Certain Tasmanian Plants which was a pioneering work in cytology and polyploidy. Following from her doctoral award in London she travelled to the United States visiting various herbaria.

She was appointed University of Tasmania Senior Lecturer in Botany in 1951 and Reader in Botany in 1956, the most senior position held by a woman at the university at that time. Curtis also acted as Head of the Department on several occasions.

She submitted her published works to the University of London for a Doctor of Science degree in 1967 which was conferred in 1968.

From 1967 to 1978 she wrote the six-volume The Endemic Flora of Tasmania, with illustrations by Margaret Stones. This was a commission sponsored initially by Lord Talbot of Malahide and then by his sister Rose Maud Talbot.

Her mother died in 1962 and she nursed her father at home until his death in 1967. Dr. Curtis retired from the Department of Botany in 1966 and was appointed Honorary Research Fellow; she was made an Honorary Research Associate in the Department of Plant Science in 1998.

She died on 14 October 2005 in Hobart.

== Awards and recognition ==
As well as her academic achievements, other awards include:

- Royal Society of Tasmanian Clive Lord Memorial Medal (1966)
- Australian Natural History Medallion (1976)
- Membership of the Order of Australia (1977)
- Honorary DSc from the University of Tasmania (1987)
- Australian Plants Award (1988)
- Mueller Medal, by the Australian and New Zealand Association for the Advancement of Science (1995)
- Hobart Citizen of the Year (1997)

A number of Tasmanian vascular plants have been named in her honour, including Richea curtisiae – A.M. Gray; Epilobium curtisiae – Raven; Viola hederacea subsp. curtisiae – L. Adams; Epacris curtisiae – Jarman; Winifredia sola – L.A.S.Johnston & B.Briggs.

The 'Winifred Curtis Scamander Reserve', a 75 hectare private nature reserve located 2 km south of Scamander on Tasmania's North-East coast is named in her honour.

A teaching laboratory at the University of Tasmania's School of Plant Science is named the 'Curtis Laboratory', and the 'Winifred Curtis Prize' has been awarded annually to the student who demonstrated the greatest proficiency in first year Plant Science courses since 1990.
