= Milo Talbot, 7th Baron Talbot of Malahide =

The Rt Hon. Milo John Reginald Talbot, 7th Baron Talbot of Malahide and 4th Baron Talbot de Malahide, (Note: Milo Talbot was the seventh Baron Talbot of Malahide in the Peerage of Ireland, and the fourth Baron Talbot de Malahide in the Peerage of the United Kingdom.) CMG (1 December 1912 – 14 April 1973), was an Anglo-Irish aristocrat, British diplomat, and accomplished Irish botanist and horticulturist. When using his title, he was usually known as Lord Talbot of Malahide. He had succeeded to the barony in 1948.

== Early life ==
Talbot was the son of Eva Joicey and Col. Milo George Talbot, fourth son of the 4th Baron Talbot of Malahide. He was educated at Winchester College and Trinity College, Cambridge, and entered His Majesty's Diplomatic Service in 1937. According to the Malahide Heritage Society webpage: "much of Milo’s career during the 1940s and early 50s is shrouded in mystery and rumour". While at Cambridge, Guy Burgess had been his history tutor and Anthony Blunt was also reported to have tutored him. Kim Philby and Donald Maclean were also at Cambridge around this time, but it is not known if Milo knew him. Milo is thought to have worked in the Secret Service for some years during the Second World War and to have encountered some of these men in the Foreign Office and in diplomatic postings abroad, especially at Ankara in Turkey. In the course of Milo’s time at the Foreign Office during the Cold War, Burgess and Maclean defected to the Russians after Philby alerted them to the fact that they were under suspicion. Milo retired in 1956 aged 45. Philby subsequently defected as well, and was to be followed by Blunt who was exposed as a double agent. Blunt had been a regular guest of Milo at Malahide Castle.

== Diplomatic career ==
In 1954, Lord Talbot of Malahide was appointed as the British Envoy Extraordinary and Minister Plenipotentiary to the newly independent Kingdom of Laos, which had formerly been part of French Indochina. The post was upgraded to that of ambassador the following year. He remained in the post until 1956, when he was appointed a Companion of the Order of St Michael and St George (CMG).

== Personal life ==
A keen gardener, Lord Talbot of Malahide commissioned and sponsored the book The Endemic Flora of Tasmania. Lord Talbot of Malahide was undoubtedly the most knowledgeable Irish gardener of his time. The gardens of Malahide Castle were largely created between 1942 and 1973 by Talbot. In all, there are in excess of 5,000 different species and varieties of plants present, some of which Talbot brought back from his travels in Australasia.

Milo succeeded his cousin, James Talbot, in the barony in 1948, and inherited Malahide Castle and Estate at which he enhanced the gardens. A monkish and aloof homosexual bachelor, in Australia he met Tony Scotland, a young television reporter, 35 years his junior, whom he mentored and failed to seduce, but whose own homosexuality he attempted to cure, fearing it would make the young man as lonely as he was. Scotland eventually rejected such efforts.

Lord Talbot of Malahide died suddenly in April 1973, aged 60, whilst cruising with a friend in the Aegean. The British barony of Talbot de Malahide died with him. He was succeeded in the Irish barony of Talbot of Malahide by his kinsman, Reginald Talbot.

The castle and gardens were inherited by his sister, The Hon. Rose Maud Talbot, who burnt all his private papers, and had to sell valuables so that the estate could be ceded to the Irish State (in order to offset inheritance taxes), and specifically was vested in the former Dublin County Council. The walled botanical gardens and glasshouses, containing Lord Talbot of Malahide's remarkable collection of Southern hemisphere and other plants, were also restored and conserved. There are guided tours of the castle daily and visitors stroll at their leisure through the wonderful gardens. The Castle and 260 acre Demesne now falls within the Fingal County Council parks department, and is managed by an outside contractor with a popular Avoca restaurant and boutique shops. The grounds consist of a public park area and public sports fields.

== Notes ==
Diplomatic posts
Preceded by Sir Hubert Graves (Non-resident)	British Ambassador to Laos; 1954–1956	Succeeded by Leonard Holliday
Peerage of Ireland
Preceded by James Boswell Talbot	Baron Talbot of Malahide; 1948–1973	Succeeded by Reginald Stanislaus Vernon Talbot
Peerage of the United Kingdom
Preceded by James Boswell Talbot	Baron Talbot de Malahide; 1948–1973	Extinct
