= Ormeau railway station (Northern Ireland) =

Former railway station in Belfast

Ormeau

General information
- Location: Belfast; Northern Ireland

Other information
- Status: Disused

History
- Original company: Belfast Central Railway

Key dates
- 1876: Station opens
- 1885: Station closes

Ormeau railway station was on the Belfast Central Railway which ran from the Ulster (later Belfast Central) Junction on the Ulster Railway to Ballymacarrett Junction on the Belfast and County Down Railway, through central Belfast, Ireland.

== History ==
The Belfast Central Railway was built in 1875 to connect the three railway lines in Belfast (the Ulster Railway, the Belfast and County Down Railway (BCDR) and the Belfast and Northern Counties Railway (BNCR)). It branched off from the Ulster Railway (later the Great Northern Railway (Ireland) (GNRI) at Ulster Junction, and ran for 1½ miles to Queen's Bridge, with a branch from East Bridge Street Junction to the BCDR at Ballymacarrett Junction. A link to the BNCR was built later, via a tunnel under Queen's Bridge to the dock board railway at Donegall Quay Junction which, in turn, connected to the BNCR. This was used for goods only.

Ormeau station opened to passengers in 1878. In 1885, the Belfast Central Railway was acquired by GNRI, closed to passengers and Ormeau station was consequently closed.

Preceding station	Historical railways	Following station
Windsor; Line open, station closed	Belfast Central Railway	Queen's Bridge; Line and station closed
