= Queen's Bridge railway station =

Rail terminus in Belfast, Northern Ireland

Queen's Bridge

General information
- Location: Queen's Bridge, Belfast; County Antrim; Northern Ireland
- Coordinates: 54.5985°N 5.9213°W

Other information
- Status: Demolished

History
- Original company: Belfast Central Railway
- Pre-grouping: Great Northern Railway (Ireland)

Key dates
- 12 June 1876: Station opens to goods
- 5 August 1878: Station opens to passengers
- 30 November 1885: Station closes to passengers
- 1960: Station closes completely and is demolished
Location

Queen's Bridge railway station was the terminus of the Belfast Central Railway which ran from the Ulster (later Belfast Central) Junction on the Ulster Railway and later Great Northern Railway (Ireland) to Ballymacarrett Junction on the Belfast and County Down Railway, through central Belfast, Ireland.

== History ==
The Belfast Central Railway was built in 1875 to connect the three railway lines in Belfast (the Ulster Railway, the Belfast and County Down Railway (BCDR) and the Belfast and Northern Counties Railway (BNCR)). It initially opened to goods on 12 June 1876 and then to passengers on 5 August 1878. It branched off from the Ulster Railway (later the Great Northern Railway (Ireland) (GNRI) at Ulster Junction, and ran for 1½ miles to Queen's Bridge, with a branch from East Bridge Street Junction to the BCDR at Ballymacarrett Junction. A link to the BNCR was built later, via a tunnel under Queen's Bridge to the dock board railway at Donegall Quay Junction which, in turn, connected to the BNCR. This was used for goods only.

Queen's Bridge station opened to passengers in 1878. It had a single platform on which stood a single-storey brick building with a pitched roof and rectangular window openings. In 1885, the Belfast Central Railway was acquired by GNRI due to competition from the Belfast Street Tramways leading to profits not being as high as expected, and closed to passengers. Ormeau and Windsor stations were consequently closed and Queen's Bridge was now only used as a junction station for goods. The station was closed and demolished in 1960 and the line from East Bridge Street Junction to Donegall Quay Junction was closed on 3 June 1963 by the Ulster Transport Authority (UTA).

== Routes ==
Preceding station	Historical railways	Following station
Ormeau; Line and station closed	Belfast Central Railway; GNRI direction	Terminus
Ballymacarrett Junction; Line and junction closed	Belfast Central Railway; BCDR direction	Terminus
