= Goraghwood railway station =

Railway station in Northern Ireland

Goraghwood
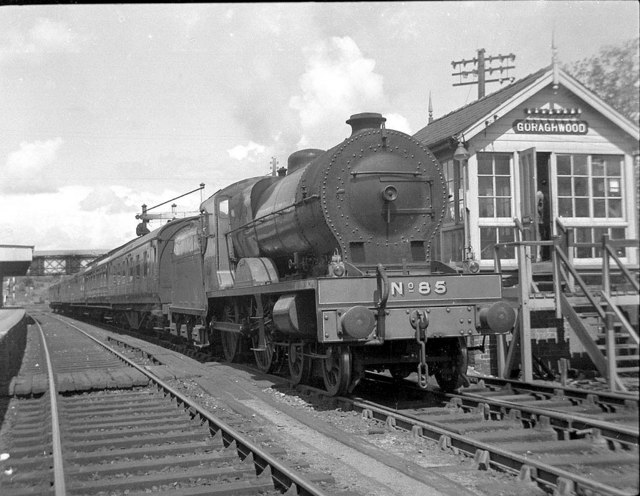
- Goraghwood railway station

General information
- Location: Goraghwood, near Newry; County Armagh; Northern Ireland
- Coordinates: 54.22416°N 6.36491°W
- Grid position: J0631
- Line: Great Northern Main Line

Construction
- Structure type: At-grade

Other information
- Status: Disused

History
- Original company: Dublin and Belfast Junction Railway and Newry and Enniskillen Railway
- Pre-grouping: Great Northern Railway (Ireland)
- Post-grouping: Great Northern Railway (Ireland)

Key dates
- 6 March 1854: Opened
- 1864: Armagh line opened
- 1955: Armagh line closed
- 4 January 1965: Closed to goods traffic
- 15 February 1965: Closed to passenger traffic
- 1965: Warrenpoint line closed

Historical railways
Preceding station	Historical railways	Following station
Bessbrook; Line open, station open as Newry	Dublin and Belfast Junction Railway; Portadown–Drogheda	Poyntzpass; Line and station open
Bessbrook; Line open, station open as Newry	Great Northern Railway (Ireland); Belfast–Dublin	Poyntzpass; Line and station open
Newry Edward Street; Line and station closed	Newry and Enniskillen Railway; Newry–Goraghwood	Terminus
Terminus	Newry and Armagh Railway; Goraghwood–Armagh	Glenanne; Line and station closed
Newry Edward Street; Line and station closed	Great Northern Railway (Ireland); Newry–Armagh / Warrenpoint–Armagh	Glenanne; Line and station closed
Location
- Location within Northern Ireland Location within island of Ireland

Goraghwood railway station was a railway station in County Armagh in Northern Ireland; it was opened in 1854 and closed in 1965.

Goraghwood was opened on 6 March 1854 on the Dublin and Belfast Junction Railway. From 1864 the Newry and Armagh Railway (N&A) ran trains as well to its own temporary terminus just outside Armagh until it started using the Ulster Railway's Armagh railway station in 1865.

Goraghwood was an important junction on the Dublin to Belfast railway line with branch lines to Armagh and another to Newry town station and Warrenpoint. The line to Armagh closed in 1955 and to Newry in 1965.

== Closure ==
The Ulster Transport Authority closed Goraghwood to freight on 4 January 1965 and to passengers on 15 February 1965.

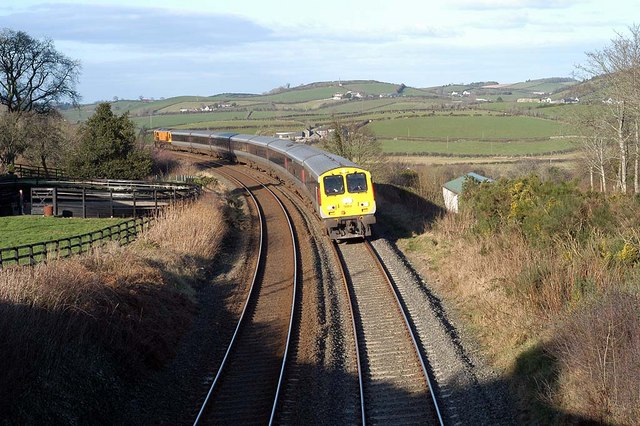
Goraghwood with the Enterprise.
