= Windsor railway station (Northern Ireland) =

Station in central Belfast

Windsor

General information
- Location: Belfast; Northern Ireland

Other information
- Status: Disused

History
- Original company: Belfast Central Railway

Key dates
- 1876: Station opens
- 1885: Station closes

Windsor railway station was on the Belfast Central Railway which ran from Ulster (later Belfast Central) Junction on the Ulster Railway to Ballymacarrett Junction on the Belfast and County Down Railway, through central Belfast, Ireland.

== History ==
The Belfast Central Railway was built in 1875 to connect the three railway lines in Belfast (the Ulster Railway, the Belfast and County Down Railway (BCDR) and the Belfast and Northern Counties Railway (BNCR)). It branched off from the Ulster Railway (later the Great Northern Railway Ireland (GNRI) at Ulster Junction, and ran for 1½ miles to Queen's Bridge, with a branch from East Bridge Street Junction to the BCDR at Ballymacarrett Junction. A link to the BNCR was built later, via a tunnel under Queen's Bridge to the dock board railway at Donegall Quay Junction which, in turn, connected to the BNCR. This was used for goods only.

Windsor station opened to passengers in 1878. In 1885, the Belfast Central Railway was acquired by GNRI, closed to passengers and Windsor station was consequently closed. The name was later used for Adelaide and Windsor station from 1897 until it was shortened to Adelaide in 1935. The site is now occupied by Botanic railway station.

Preceding station	Historical railways	Following station
Balmoral; Line and station open	Belfast Central Railway	Ormeau; Line open, station closed
