= Tynan and Caledon railway station =

Closed railway station in Northern Ireland

Tynan and Caledon
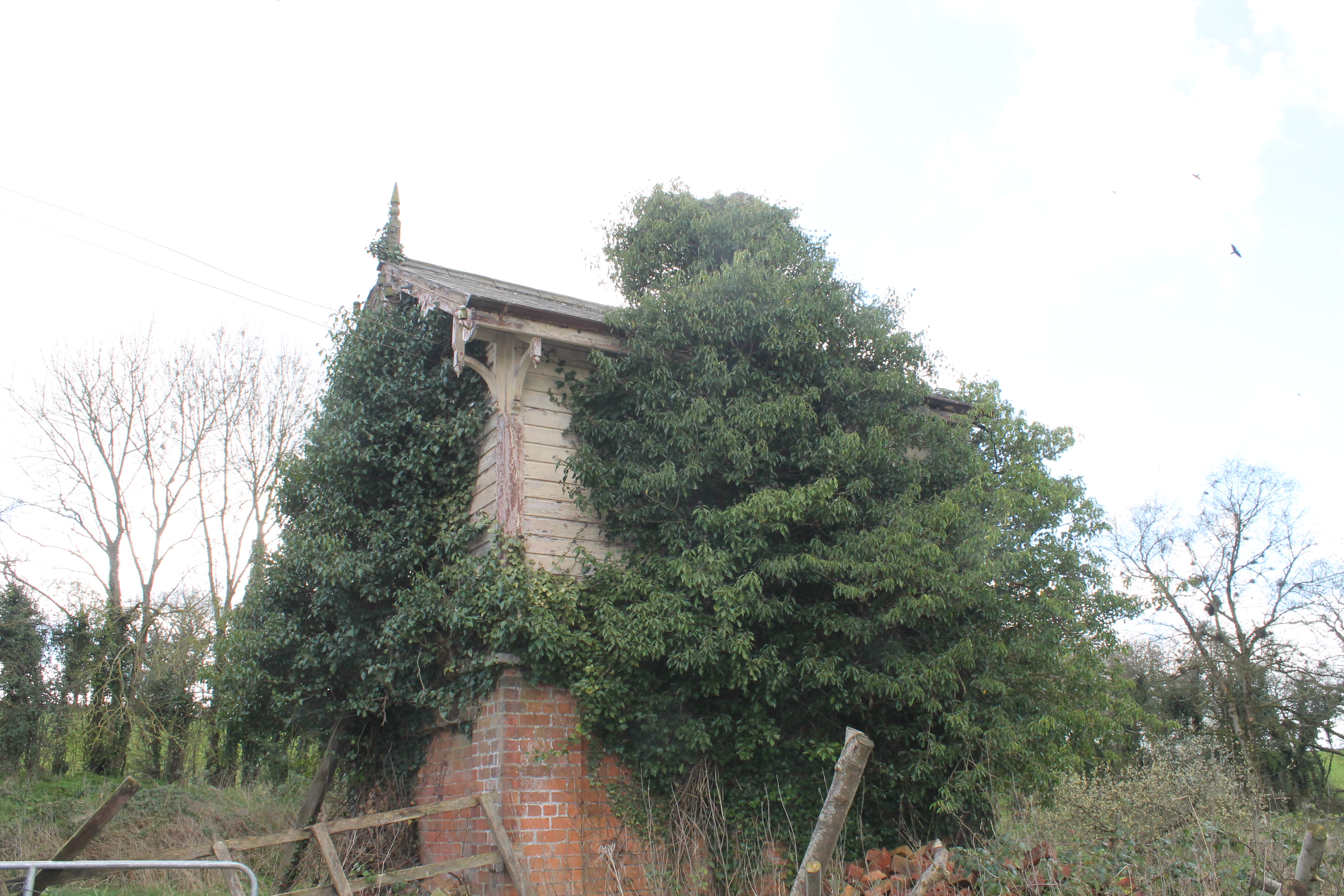
- The derelict signal cabin, now overgrown with trees protruding from the windows

General information
- Location: Tynan, County Armagh, Northern Ireland; UK
- Coordinates: 54.339399°N 6.821546°W

History
- Original company: Ulster Railway
- Post-grouping: Great Northern Railway (Ireland)

Key dates
- 25 May 1858: Station opens as Tynan, Caledon & Middletown
- 1 January 1880: Station renamed Tynan & Caledon
- 14 October 1957: Station closes
Location

Tynan and Caledon railway station was on the Ulster Railway in Northern Ireland.

The Ulster Railway opened the station on 25 May 1858 as Tynan, Caledon & Middletown.

On 1 January 1880 it was renamed Tynan & Caledon.

It closed on 14 October 1957.

== Routes ==
Preceding station	Disused railways	Following station
Killylea	Ulster Railway; Portadown to Clones	Glaslough
Terminus	Clogher Valley Railway; Tynan to Maguiresbridge	Caledon
