= Killylea railway station =

Railway station in Northern Ireland

Killylea

General information
- Location: Killylea, County Armagh, Northern Ireland; UK
- Coordinates: 54.353089°N 6.766339°W

History
- Original company: Ulster Railway
- Post-grouping: Great Northern Railway (Ireland)

Key dates
- 25 May 1858: Station opens
- 14 October 1957: Station closes
Location

Killylea railway station was on the Ulster Railway in Northern Ireland.

The Ulster Railway opened the station on 25 May 1858.

In 1876 the Ulster Railway merged with other railways to become part of the Great Northern Railway (Ireland).

It closed on 14 October 1957.

== Routes ==
Preceding station	Disused railways	Following station
Armagh	Ulster Railway; Portadown to Clones	Tynan and Caledon
