= Richhill railway station =

Former stop in Northern Ireland

Richhill
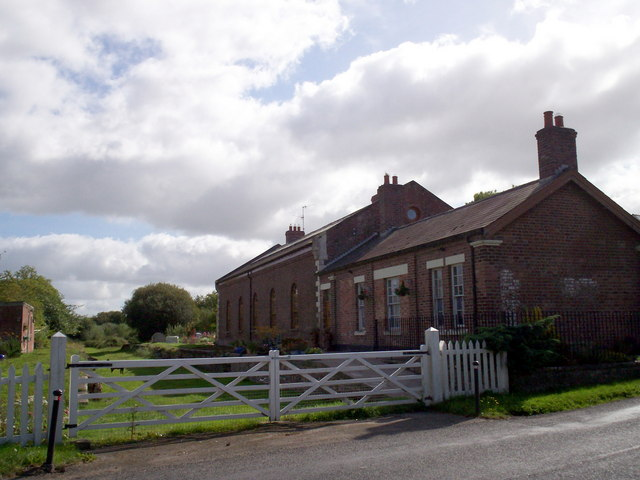
- Richhill railway station photographed on 10 September 2007

General information
- Location: Richhill, County Armagh, County Armagh, Northern Ireland; UK
- Coordinates: 54.385221°N 6.572025°W

History
- Original company: Ulster Railway
- Post-grouping: Great Northern Railway (Ireland)

Key dates
- 1 March 1848: Station opens
- 1 October 1957: Station closes
Location

Richhill railway station was on the Ulster Railway in Northern Ireland.

The Ulster Railway opened the station on 1 March 1848.

It closed on 10 October 1957.

== Proposals ==
As of 2014, there was some discussion about reopening the line between Portadown and Armagh. Therefore, a new station at Richhill would be likely, probably close to Stonebridge or Fruitfield.

== Routes ==
Preceding station	Disused railways	Following station
Portadown	Ulster Railway; Portadown to Clones 1848-1876	Armagh
Portadown	Great Northern Railway (Ireland); Portadown to Clones 1936-1957	Retreat Halt
