= Retreat railway station (disambiguation) =

Retreat railway station is a station in Cape Town, South Africa

Retreat railway station may also refer to:

- Hampton railway station, Melbourne, formerly known as Retreat railway station
- Retreat railway station (Northern Ireland), a former station on the Ballymena, Cushendall and Red Bay Railway in County Antrim, Northern Ireland.
- Retreat Halt railway station, a former station on the Great Northern Railway in County Armagh, Northern Ireland.
