= Smithborough =

Village in County Monaghan, Ireland

Smithborough Na Mullaí
- Village
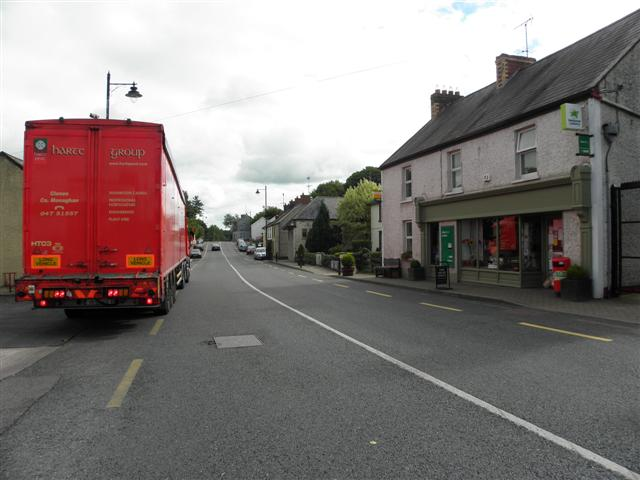
- Post office on Smithborough's main street

- Location in Ireland
- Coordinates: 54°13′18″N 7°05′50″W
- Country: Ireland
- Province: Ulster
- County: County Monaghan
- Barony: Monaghan

Population (2016)
  - Total: 395

Smithborough or Smithboro (Irish: Na Mullaí) is a village in County Monaghan, Ireland. It is within the townlands of Mullaghduff and Mullaghbrack, roughly midway between Monaghan town and Clones on the N54. Nearby villages within 6–7 km (3.7–4.3 mi) are Threemilehouse, Scotstown, Ballinode, and Newbliss all within County Monaghan and Roslea in County Fermanagh. The local football team is Éire Óg, who wear blue with a gold band.

== Railways ==
The Ulster Railway opened Smithborough railway station on 2 March 1863. In 1876 the Great Northern Railway (Ireland) was formed. The station and line was closed on 14 October 1957.

== See also ==
- List of towns and villages in the Republic of Ireland
- Ulster Canal
