= Killylea =

Village in County Armagh, Northern Ireland

Coordinates: 54°21′N 6°47′W

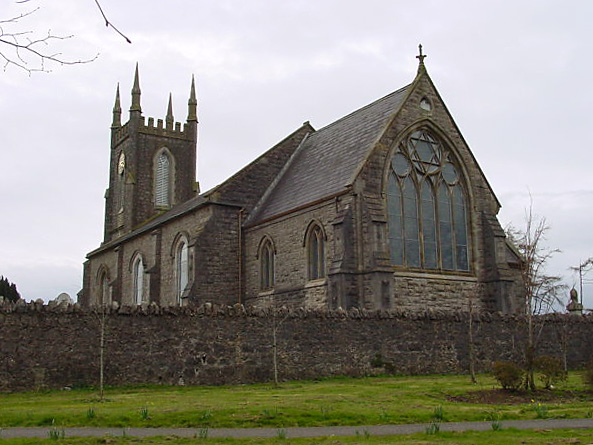
- St Mark's Parish Church, Killylea
- Country: Northern Ireland
- Sovereign state: United Kingdom
- Dialling code: 028
- UK Parliament: Newry and Armagh
- NI Assembly: Newry and Armagh

Killylea (/kɪliːˈleɪ/; from Irish Coillidh Léith 'grey forest') is a small village and townland in Northern Ireland. It is within the Armagh City and District Council area. The village is set on a hill, with St Mark's Church of Ireland, built in 1832, at its summit. The village lies to the west of County Armagh, and is close to the neighbouring counties of County Tyrone and County Monaghan which is in the Republic of Ireland. It had a population of 253 people in the 2011 census.

== History ==
In 1858 Killylea railway station opened, situated on the Elm Park Road. It was opened by the Ulster Railway and became part of the Great Northern Railway in 1876, offering people the chance to travel to Belfast and Dublin. Like most rural railways in Northern Ireland, it was not to last and eventually closed in 1957. The station platforms can still be seen today from the railway bridge on the Elm Park Road.

In September 1887 events on the platform of Killylea railway station made it into the British House of Commons as Alexander Blane, Nationalist MP for South Armagh asked a question relating to an attack on a train by what he described as an "Orange mob". Edward King-Harman, then Under-Secretary for Ireland, stated "that a party of Nationalists returning by train from a meeting at Middle-town, County Armagh, while passing Killylea Station, which is essentially an Orange district, made use of party cries" and that the only shot fired was from the train, concluding that "Nationalists appear to have been altogether responsible" for the events. He goes on to say that a "boy" was injured by the shot fired from the train but that he escaped with only minor injuries to his foot.

From 1920 to 1954 Killylea was home to an elite private school, Elm Park Preparatory School. This was set up by Seth Smith and Willoughby Weaving to educate boys up to the age of 14. Following the outbreak of World War II, the school's population expanded dramatically because parents believed that it was safer than sending their children to England. This expansion, however, was not to last and due to a decline in numbers in the years following World War II, the school was forced to close in 1954. One of the most famous pupils to attend Elm Park school was Brian Faulkner who was to become the sixth and final Prime Minister of Northern Ireland, presiding over the prorogation of the Stormont Parliament in 1972 following the outbreak of the Troubles only a few years earlier. Faulkner attended the school from 1933 to 1935. There is still a pew in St. Mark's Church which bears the name of the school as it is where the boys sat when they attended church each Sunday.

Killylea has always been closely associated with hunting, with the traditional Boxing Day hunt taking place in December each year. This tradition stretches back to 1838 when the Tynan and Armagh Harriers were established by Sir James Stronge.

== Demography ==
=== 2011 census ===
In the 2011 census, Killylea had a population of 253 people (in 107 households).

=== 2001 census ===
In the 2001 census, the village and some of the surrounding area including, Fellow's Hall, Aughrafin and Elm Park, had a population of 351 people. Of these, 9.1% said that they were from the Catholic community and 89.5% of the population declared that they had a 'Protestant or other' community background.

== Railways ==
The Ulster Railway opened Killylea railway station on 25 May 1858. In 1876 the Ulster Railway was merged with other railway companies to form the Great Northern Railway (Ireland). The line and station were closed on 14 October 1957.

== Transport ==
Killylea is situated just off the A28, Aughnacloy to Newry road. Five miles to the east, this leads to the city of Armagh, and beyond to the south-west towards Newry. To the west, the A28 leads towards Aughnacloy and, beyond, towards Omagh and Enniskillen.

Further afield, Killylea is also served by the M1 motorway which can be accessed twelve miles to the north, near Dungannon or, alternatively, near Portadown which is fifteen miles to the north-east.

== Education ==
Killylea Primary School caters for around 80 children between the ages of 4 and 11 from the village of Killylea and the surrounding area.

== Religion ==
There are two places of worship in Killylea. At the summit of Killylea's hill is the oldest of the two churches, St. Mark's Church of Ireland. At the bottom of the hill is Killylea Methodist Church.

== Sport ==
Killylea is home to a lawn bowls club who regularly compete in leagues in Armagh.

A former association football team, which previously represented the village, used to compete in local leagues under the name of Killylea Swifts Football Club.

== Culture ==
The Orange Order has a presence in the village and district with 11 lodges in the surrounding area and two in the village itself. There are also several marching bands in the area, including the Cormeen Rising Sons of William Flute Band, Killylea Silver Band, the Crozier Memorial Pipe Band and Ballyrea Boyne Defenders Flute Band. Two of the largest band parades in Northern Ireland's parading calendar are hosted in Killylea. Cormeen host their parade on St. Patrick's Day every year and Ballyrea hold a Battle of the Somme commemoration parade every year on 1 July. In 2012, Cormeen's parade was, for the first time, held in Armagh City.

== People ==
Although born in Belfast, one of Killylea's most famous residents was John Luke. Luke is, perhaps, most famous for painting the dome of Belfast City Hall. He moved to Killylea in 1941 in order to escape the dangers of living in Belfast during World War II and lived there until his death in 1975.

Barry Close, officer in the East India Company army, was born at Elm Park, near Killylea.

== See also ==
- List of towns and villages in Northern Ireland
