= TEG Cusack Park =

Sports stadium in County Westmeath, Ireland

- Páirc Uí Chíosóig TEG
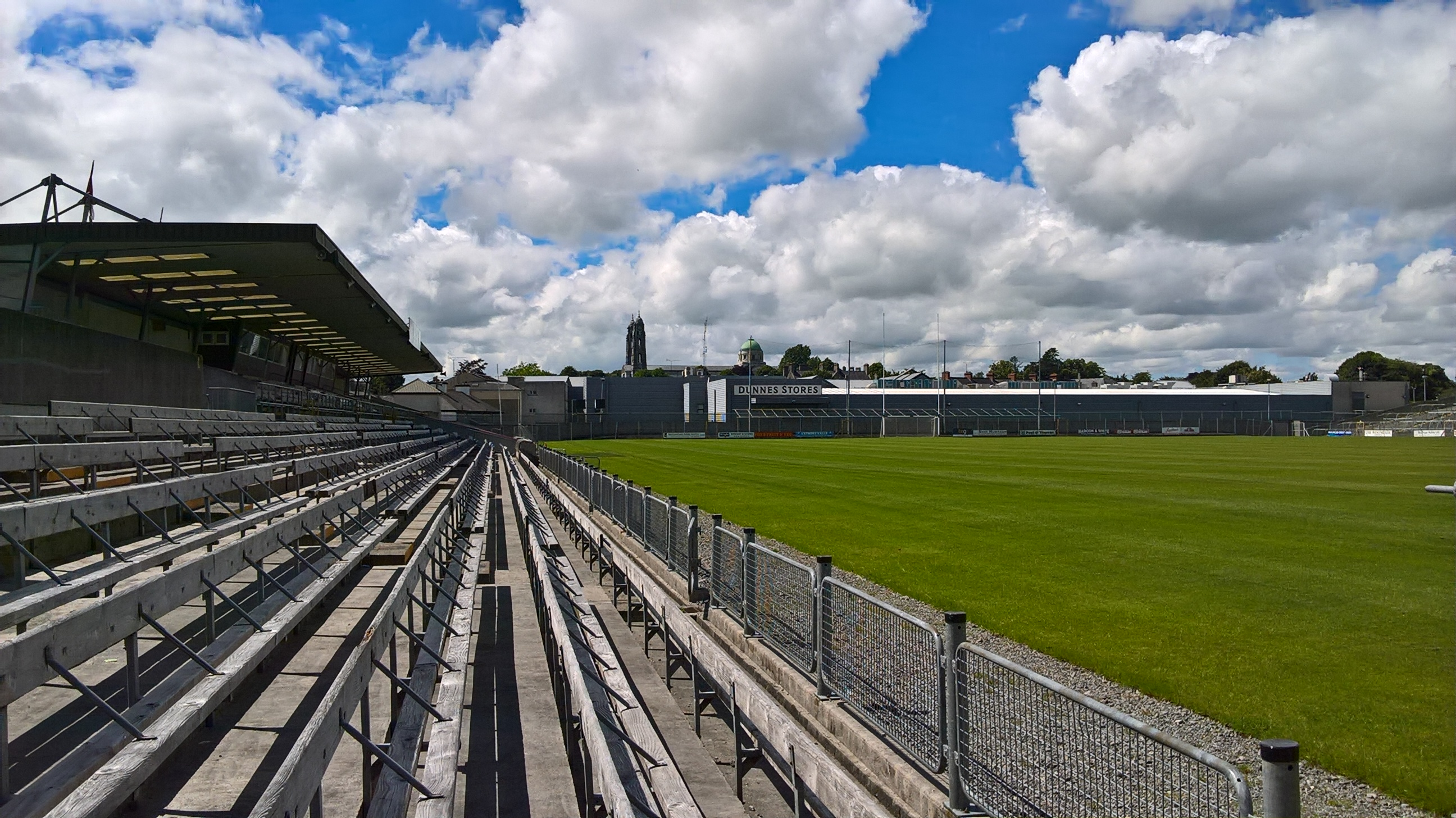
- Cusack Park Mullingar
- Interactive map of TEG Cusack Park
- Location: Friars Mill Road, Mullingar, County Westmeath, N91 NXV5, Ireland
- Coordinates: 53°31′40.83″N 7°20′18.75″W
- Public transit: Castle Street bus stop Mullingar railway station
- Owner: Westmeath GAA
- Capacity: 11,500
- Field size: 140 x 82 m

Construction
- Opened: 1933

Cusack Park (Páirc Uí Chíosóig in Irish) is a GAA stadium in Mullingar, County Westmeath, Ireland. It is the main grounds of Westmeath GAA's Gaelic football and hurling teams.

== History ==
The ground, named after GAA founder Michael Cusack, was opened in 1933 and had a capacity of 15,000. However following a national review of health and safety at GAA grounds in 2011, the overall capacity was reduced to 11,500. The opening of the stadium was marked by two matches on the same day, the latter match, Dublin versus Kerry, was opened by the dropping of a ball from a low-flying aeroplane.

In August 1994, a £1 million development programme was announced for the stadium including a new stand that would accommodate more than 2,000 with an additional 1,000 in covered accommodation, which was to begin in 1995 and be completed in time for the 1995 County Finals.

== Naming rights ==
Period	Sponsor	Name
2016-present	TEG	TEG Cusack Park

== See also ==
- List of Gaelic Athletic Association stadiums
- List of stadiums in Ireland by capacity
