= Longford railway station =

Station in County Longford, Ireland

Longford An Longfort
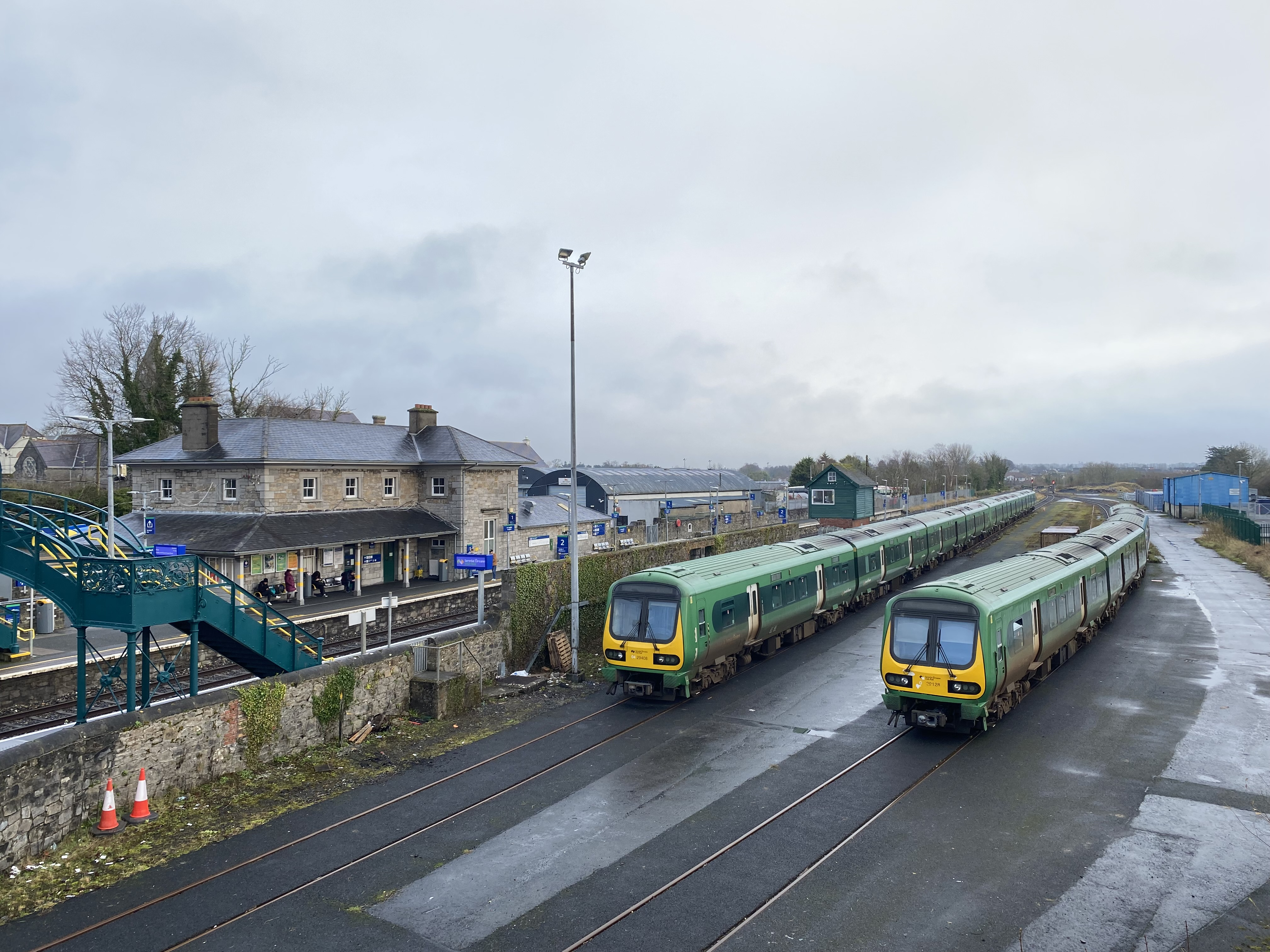

General information
- Location: Longford, County Longford, N39 E3T9; Ireland
- Coordinates: 53.7245°N 7.7950°W
- Owner: Iarnród Éireann
- Operator: Iarnród Éireann
- Platforms: 2
- Bus operators: Bus Éireann; TFI Local Link
- Connections: 22; 23; 65; 73; 425; 426; 451; 466; 469; 816; 862; 865; LR24

Construction
- Structure type: At-grade

Other information
- Station code: LFORD
- Fare zone: K

Key dates
- 1855: Station opened
- Iarnród Éireann; CIÉ; IÉ railway stations
Route map
Location

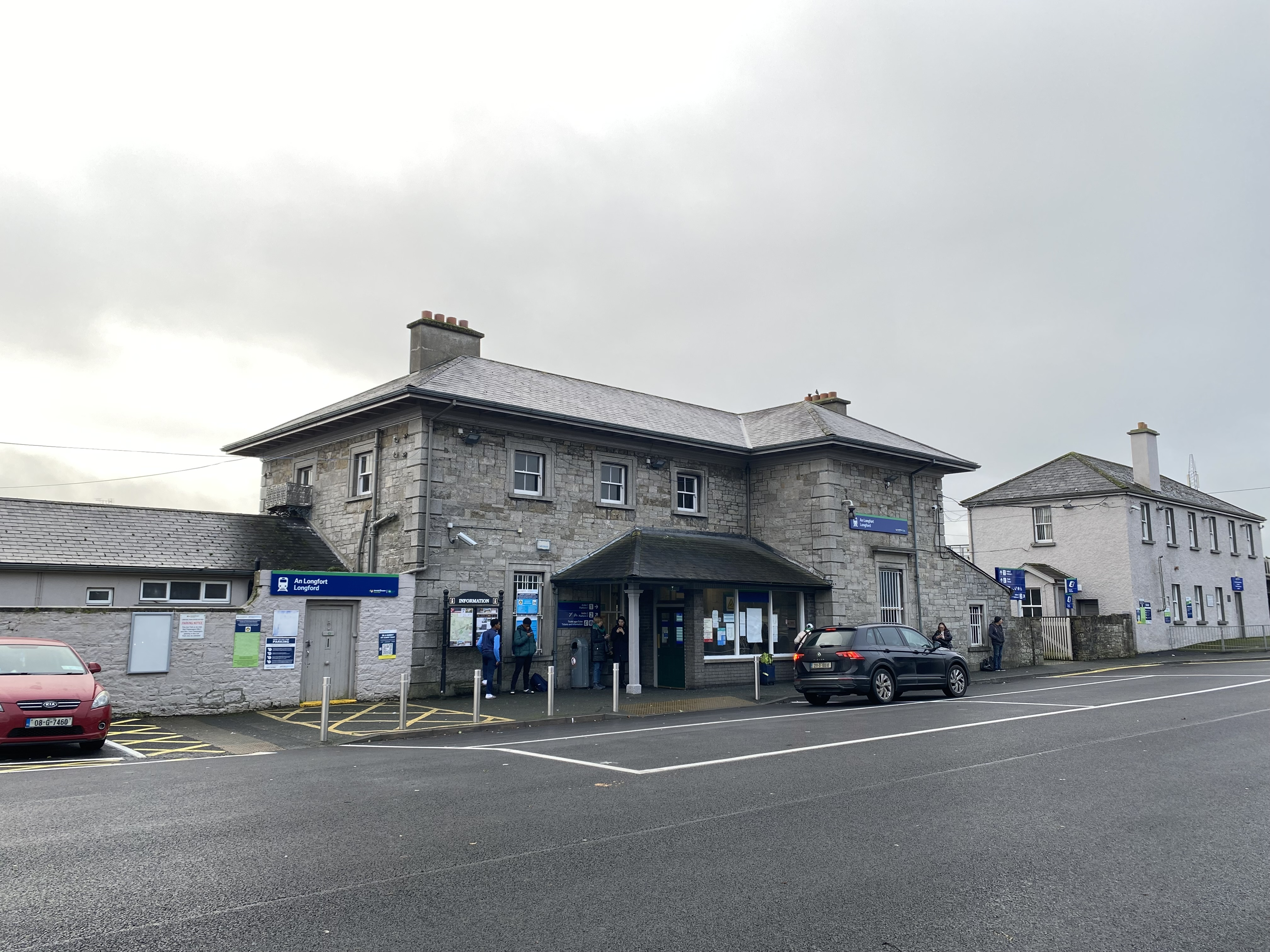
Longford railway station building

Longford Railway Station serves the town of Longford in County Longford, Ireland.

Longford is the terminus of Iarnród Éireann's Dublin Connolly–Longford Commuter service, and is also a stop on the Dublin Connolly–Sligo InterCity service.

Longford is approximately 91 kilometres (57 mi) from Sligo and 122 kilometres (76 mi) from Dublin. Journeys to the capital by rail generally take about an hour and three quarters.

== History ==
Longford railway station was opened by the Midland Great Western Railway on 8 November 1855 as the terminus of the extension of its line north-west from Mullingar. The line was further extended to Sligo in 1862.

Connecting trains in Dublin Connolly run on the Belfast Line via Drogheda MacBride , Dundalk Clarke , Newry, Portadown to Belfast Grand Central and on the Rosslare Line via Bray Daly , Greystones, Wicklow , Arklow, Enniscorthy, Wexford O'Hanrahan to Rosslare Europort.

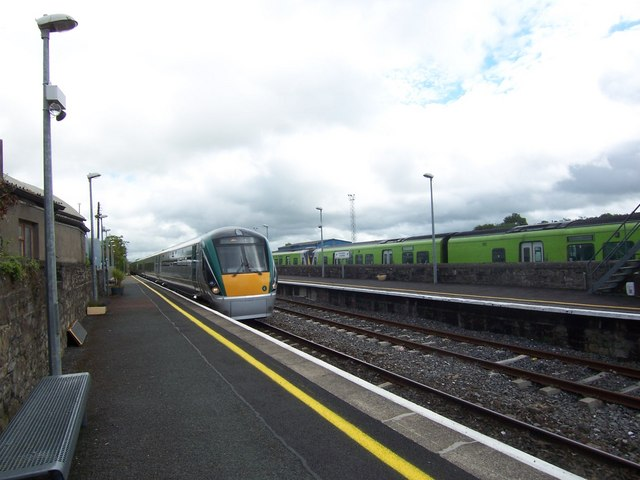
The Sligo train in Longford.

== Services ==
=== Train Services ===
Preceding station	Iarnród Éireann	Following station
Edgeworthstown	InterCity; Dublin-Sligo railway line	Dromod
Edgeworthstown	Commuter; Western Commuter	Terminus

=== Bus Services ===
Numerous Bus Éireann Expressway and TFI Local Link routes stop immediately outside the station.

== See also ==
- List of railway stations in Ireland
- Sligo-Dublin line
