= Smithborough railway station =

Former railway station in Ireland

Smithborough
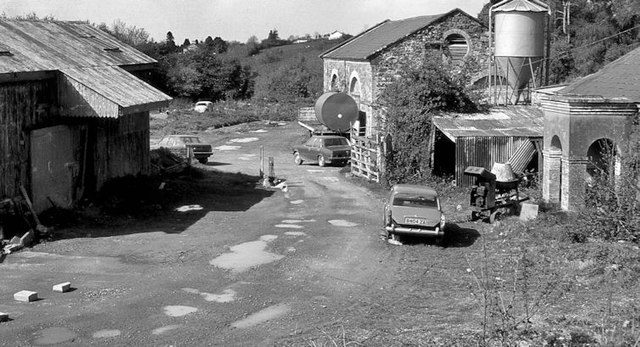
- The view of Smithborough station facing towards Clones when the site was in agricultural use.

General information
- Location: Maladuff, Smithborough; County Monaghan; Ireland

History
- Original company: Ulster Railway
- Post-grouping: Great Northern Railway (Ireland)

Key dates
- 2 March 1863: Station opens
- 14 October 1957: Station closes to passengers
- 1 June 1958: Station closes
Location

Smithborough railway station was on the Ulster Railway in the Republic of Ireland.

== History ==
The Ulster Railway opened the station on 2 March 1863.

It closed to passenger traffic on 14 October 1957 when the Northern Ireland Government forced the Great Northern Railway Board to close its cross-border lines. The Mid Ulster line survived for goods in the Republic until CIÉ closed it on 1 January 1960, while Smithborough station closed on 1 June 1958.

== Routes ==
Preceding station	Disused railways	Following station
Monaghan	Ulster Railway; Portadown to Clones	Clones
