= Armagh railway station =

Train station in Armagh, Northern Ireland

Coordinates: 54.3568°N 6.6573°W

Armagh
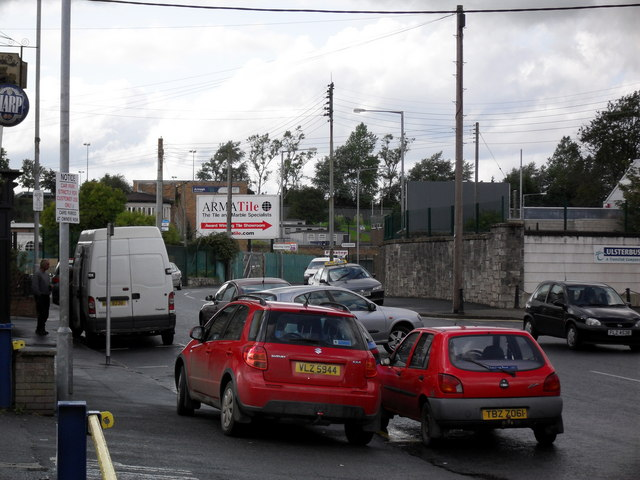
- Loughgall Road in Armagh – the old GNRI railway station was where the Ulsterbus sign (extreme right) is today

General information
- Location: Armagh, County Armagh; Northern Ireland; UK

History
- Original company: Ulster Railway
- Post-grouping: Great Northern Railway (Ireland)

Key dates
- 1 March 1848: Station opened
- 1865: Newry and Armagh Railway completed
- 12 June 1889: Armagh rail disaster
- 1910: Castleblayney, Keady and Armagh Railway completed
- 1932: passenger service withdrawn from Armagh – Keady section of CKA
- 1933: Armagh – Markethill section of N&A closed
- 1 October 1957: Station closed
Location

Armagh railway station was a railway station that served Armagh in County Armagh, Northern Ireland.

== Development ==
The Ulster Railway opened Armagh station in 1848, linking the city with Belfast. The Ulster Railway was extended from Armagh to Monaghan in 1858 and Clones in 1863.

The Newry and Armagh Railway (N&A) opened in 1864, and had its own temporary terminus just outside Armagh until it started using the Ulster Railway station in 1865.

The Castleblayney, Keady and Armagh Railway (CK&A) was completed in 1910. In 1876 the Ulster Railway became part of the new Great Northern Railway (GNR), which took over the N&A in 1879 and the CKA in 1911.

== Rail disaster ==
The Armagh rail disaster, which killed 80 people and injured 260, occurred on 12 June 1889 on the N&A line near Armagh. An excursion train had to climb a steep gradient, but the locomotive stalled. The crew decided to divide the train but, when they did so, the rear portion had inadequate brake power and ran back down the gradient, colliding with a following train. Most of the eighty people killed were women. It was previously thought that more children were killed, but most children were saved by jumping out of windows.

== Decline and closure ==
The partition of Ireland in 1922 hastened the railways' decline, and the GNR closed the Keady – Castleblayney section of the CKA in 1923. The GNR withdrew passenger trains from the Armagh – Keady section of the CKA in 1932 and closed the Armagh – Markethill section of the N&A in 1933. The Government of Northern Ireland made the GNR Board close the remaining lines serving Armagh on Monday 1 October 1957: the goods branch from Armagh to Keady and the main line through Armagh from Portadown as far as the border at Glaslough on the way to Monaghan.

== Routes ==
Preceding station	Historical railways	Following station
Richhill; Line and station closed	Ulster Railway	Killylea; Line and station closed
Richhill; Line and station closed	Great Northern Railway (Ireland); Portadown to Clones 1876-1936	Killylea; Line and station closed
Retreat Halt; Line and station closed	Great Northern Railway (Ireland); Portadown to Clones 1936-1957	Killylea; Line and station closed
Terminus	Great Northern Railway (Ireland); Castleblayney, Keady and Armagh Railway	Irish Street Halt; Line and station closed
Hamiltonsbawn; Line and station closed	Great Northern Railway; Newry and Armagh Railway	Terminus
	Proposed Services	
Monaghan	All-Island Strategic Rail Review; Mullingar-Portadown Line	Portadown

== Proposals ==
As of 2013, it was reported that a future reopened railway line to Portadown was under consideration. The then minister for Northern Ireland's Department for Regional Development, Danny Kennedy, indicated possible railway restoration plans. In proposals, published in 2014, the Armagh Line was also included in a list of potential projects.

The All-Island Strategic Rail Review published in 2023 recommended the reinstatement of services to the station as part of a line between Mullingar and Portadown.

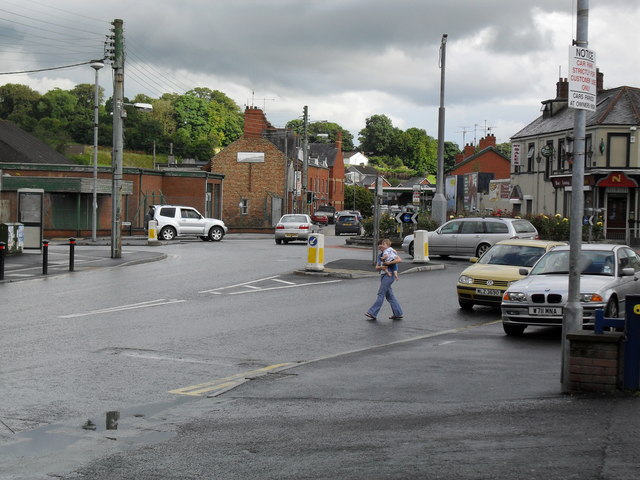
Railway Street, Armagh

== Sources ==
- Butt, R. V. J. (October 1995). The Directory of Railway Stations: details every public and private passenger station, halt, platform and stopping place, past and present (1st ed.). Sparkford: Patrick Stephens Ltd. ISBN 978-1-85260-508-7. OCLC 60251199. OL 11956311M.
- Jowett, Alan (2000). Jowett's Nationalised Railway Atlas (1st ed.). Penryn, Cornwall: Atlantic Transport Publishers. ISBN 978-0-906899-99-1. OCLC 228266687.
