= Clones railway station =

Train station in Clones, Ireland

Clones
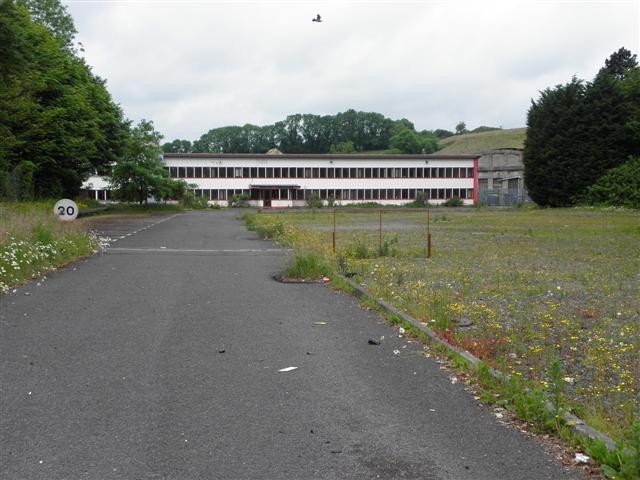
- Site of the former Clones railway station looking west from Church Hill

General information
- Location: Clones, County Monaghan; Ireland

History
- Original company: Dundalk and Enniskillen Railway, Ulster Railway
- Post-grouping: Great Northern Railway (Ireland)

Key dates
- 26 June 1858: Station opens
- 1 October 1957: Station closes to passengers
- 1 January 1960: Station closes entirely
Location

Clones railway station was a station on the Great Northern Railway (Ireland) that served the town of Clones, County Monaghan in the Ireland.

== History ==
The Dundalk and Enniskillen Railway opened the station on 26 June 1858. The Ulster Railway extended to Clones in 1862.

Following the Partition of Ireland in December 1921, a group of Irish Republican Army volunteers attempted to ambush a party of Ulster Special Constabulary policemen travelling on a train through Clones Station on 11 February 1922. The IRA volunteers entered the carriage while the train was stopped at the station and ordered the Specials to put their hand up. In the ensuing gunfight, IRA Commandant Matthew Fitzpatrick was shot and four Ulster Constabulary Specials were killed.

The station closed to passengers on 1 October 1957 due to the closure of most of the cross-border routes but the lines to Cavan, Monaghan and Dundalk survived for occasional goods until the entire lines closed in 1960.

In 2023, an All-Island Strategic Rail Review recommended the reopening of the station as part of a line between Mullingar and Portadown.

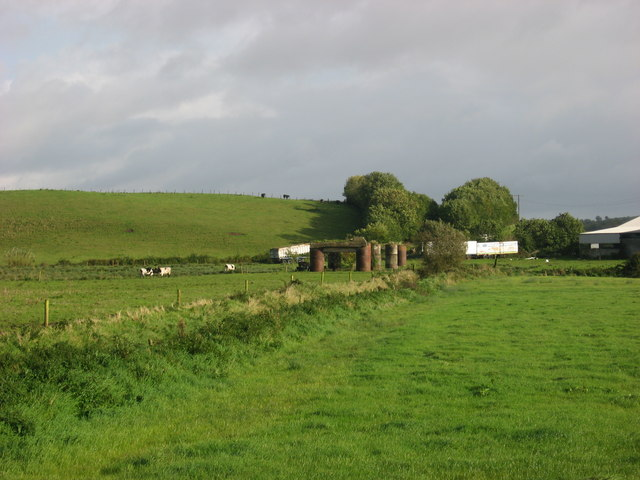
Former GNR line crossing the being restored Ulster Canal.

== Routes ==
| Preceding station | Disused railways | Following station |
|---|---|---|
| Newbliss | Dundalk and Enniskillen Railway; Dundalk to Enniskillen | Newtownbutler |
| Smithborough | Ulster Railway; Portadown to Clones | Terminus |
| Terminus | Clones and Cavan Extension Railway; Clones to Cavan | Redhills |
| | Proposed Services | |
| Cavan | All-Island Strategic Rail Review; Mullingar-Portadown Line | Monaghan |
