= Newry railway station =

Railway station in County Armagh, Northern Ireland

Newry Iúr Cinn Trá
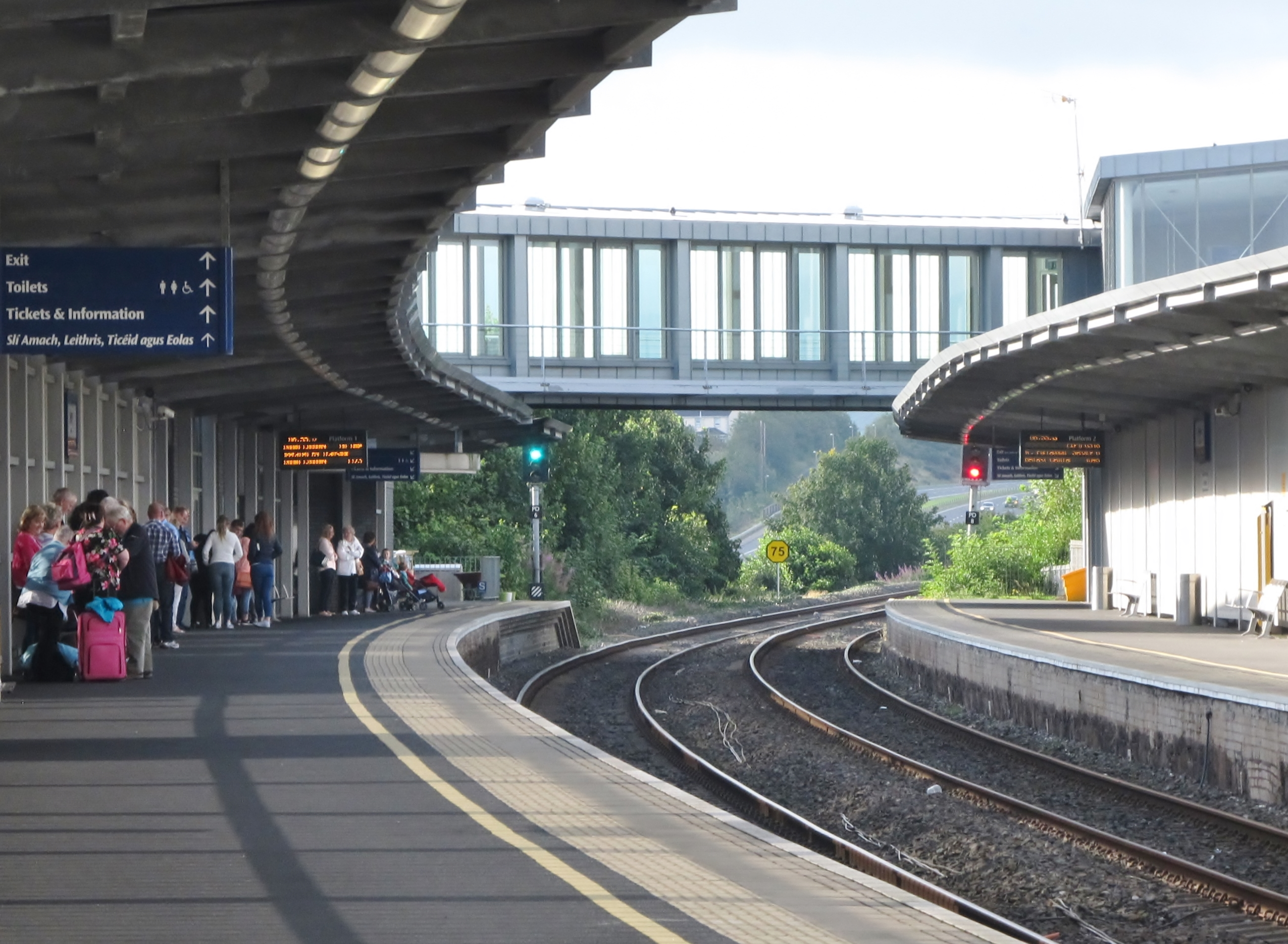
- Newry station in August 2016

General information
- Location: Newry; Northern Ireland
- Coordinates: 54.1885°N 6.3625°W
- Owner: NI Railways
- Line: Dublin–Belfast
- Distance: Belfast Lanyon Place: 44¼ Miles; Dublin Connolly: 69¼ miles
- Platforms: 2
- Tracks: 2
- Train operators: NI Railways, Iarnród Éireann
- Bus routes: 341
- Bus stands: 1
- Bus operators: Ulsterbus

Construction
- Structure type: At-grade
- Parking: Large park & ride facility
- Cycle facilities: Yes

Other information
- Station code: NIR: NY; IÉ: NEWRY
- Fare zone: 4
- Website: translink.co.uk/Newry

Key dates
- 1855: Opened as Newry Main Line
- 1942: Closed as Bessbrook
- 1984: Re-opened as Newry
- 2009: New station building opened
- 2024: Dublin commuter services cease

Passengers
- 2015/16: 242,870
- 2016/17: ▲260,033
- 2017/18: ▲282,212
- 2018/19: ▲307,288
- 2019/20: ▼279,213
- 2020/21: ▼50,542
- 2021/22: ▲179,835
- 2022/23: ▲307,551
- 2023/24: ▲356,269
- 2024/25: ▲397,919
- 2025/26: ▲571,532

Services
Preceding station	NI Railways	Following station
Dundalk Clarke towards Dublin Connolly	Enterprise	Portadown towards Belfast Grand Central
Terminus	Portadown Line	Poyntzpass towards Portadown or Belfast Grand Central

Former services
Preceding station	Iarnród Éireann	Following station
Dundalk Clarke towards Dublin Connolly	Commuter Northern Commuter (One train per day in each direction; until September 2024)	Terminus

Historical railways
Preceding station	Historical railways	Following station
Adavoyle; Line open, station closed	Dublin and Belfast Junction Railway; Portadown–Drogheda	Goraghwood; Line open, station closed
Adavoyle; Line open, station closed	Great Northern Railway (Ireland); Belfast–Dublin	Goraghwood; Line open, station closed
- NI Railways; Translink; NI railway stations
Route map
(Click to expand)
Location
- Location within Northern Ireland Location within island of Ireland
Notes
- Passenger figures do not include Iarnród Éireann Northern Commuter services

Newry railway station (Irish: Stáisiún Traenach Iúr Cinn Trá) serves the city of Newry and the village of Bessbrook in Northern Ireland. The station is located in the northwest of Newry, County Armagh on the Dublin-Belfast line close to the Craigmore Viaduct. It is the most southerly railway station in Northern Ireland.

The current station building (constructed in 2009) features 2 platforms that are accessible by a footbridge with lifts and inside the station concourse there is a ticket office and ticket machines, as well as toilets, vending machines and seats. The entrance to the platforms from the station concourse is closed off by a gate which is only opened by staff members around 10 minutes before scheduled departures.

Translink Ulsterbus operates a free of charge bus service from outside the station to Newry city centre for rail ticket holders.

== History ==
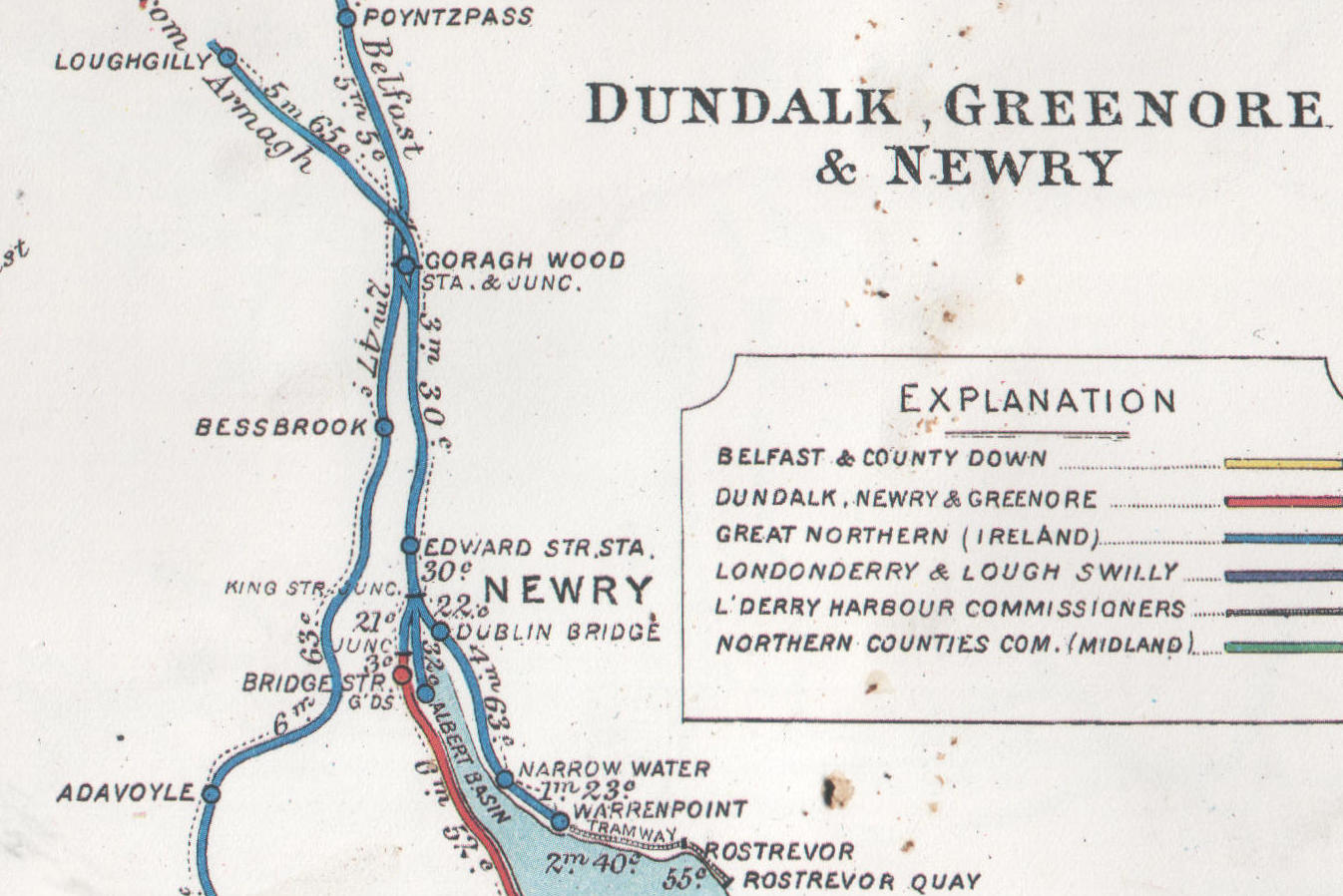
Newry rail lines c. 1910

The port of Newry was already a transport hub by 1742 with the opening of the Newry Canal to Lough Neagh. By the start of the twentieth century Newry had become a railway hub, with the Belfast to Dublin line passing to the west of the town, while lines from the ports of Warrenpoint and Greenore either side of Carlingford Lough converged closer to the centre of town where stations were more conveniently situated. All converged at Goraghwood to the north of Newry where a line also diverged off to the north-west towards Armagh.

The current Newry station originally opened in 1855 as Newry Main Line, renamed Bessbrook & Newry Main Line in 1866, renamed again as Bessbrook in 1880 before closing in 1942.

With this closure Newry was served by the Edward Street station, however this was to close with the Warrenpoint branch in 1965, leaving Newry with no railway station.

The station re-opened in 1984 as an NIR Intercity station, with basic facilities such as a temporary booking office. These facilities remained in place for over 20 years from the station's opening by which time their condition was deteriorating. In order to improve facilities for passengers a modern new station building was constructed and officially opened on 26 November 2009.

=== Other stations in Newry ===
- Albert Basin, on the canal branch.
- Armagh Road, temporary station at Mullaghlass on main line. Opened as Newry, Armagh Road 6 January 1852, renamed 'Mullaghglass' 1 April 1854, closed 1 January 1856.
- Bridge Street, Dundalk, Newry and Greenore Railway station. Opened 1 August 1876, closed 10 August 1882 to 1 April 1884, reduced to halt status 1 November 1932, closed 1 January 1952.
- Dublin Bridge, Newry, Warrenpoint and Rostrevor Railway (NW&RR). Opened 2 September 1861, closed 4 January 1965.
- Edward Street, Opened by the Newry and Armagh Railway (then Newry and Enniskillen) on 1 March 1854 and closed 4 January 1965.
- Kilmorey Street, Original terminus of NW&RR. Opened 9 May 1849. All traces gone by 1903 as not in Railway Clearing House listings for that year.

== Service ==
The station is a calling point on the Enterprise express service, which operates between Belfast Grand Central and Dublin Connolly. These trains call at Newry for both destinations, operating approximately hourly throughout most of the day. There are also a limited number of local services to and from Belfast Grand Central, operated by NI Railways, with additional services terminating at or originating from Portadown.

On Sundays, Enterprise services operate at a reduced frequency, alongside a limited number of local NI Railways services between Newry, Portadown and Belfast Grand Central.

Additionally, until September 2024, two peak-time services were operated each day to and from Newry by Iarnród Éireann. The first was the 06:30 service to Dublin Connolly, stopping at Commuter stations between Newry and Dublin Connolly, except Gormanston, Portmarnock, Clongriffin, and Howth Junction & Donaghmede. The first peak service to Newry began in January 2018, when the 17:13 service from Dublin Pearse was extended to Newry from Dundalk Clarke. These services were discontinued following the timetable change in September 2024.

== Gallery ==
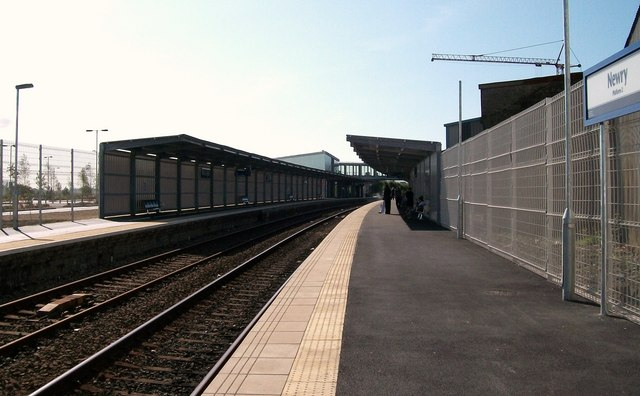
Newry station in August 2009

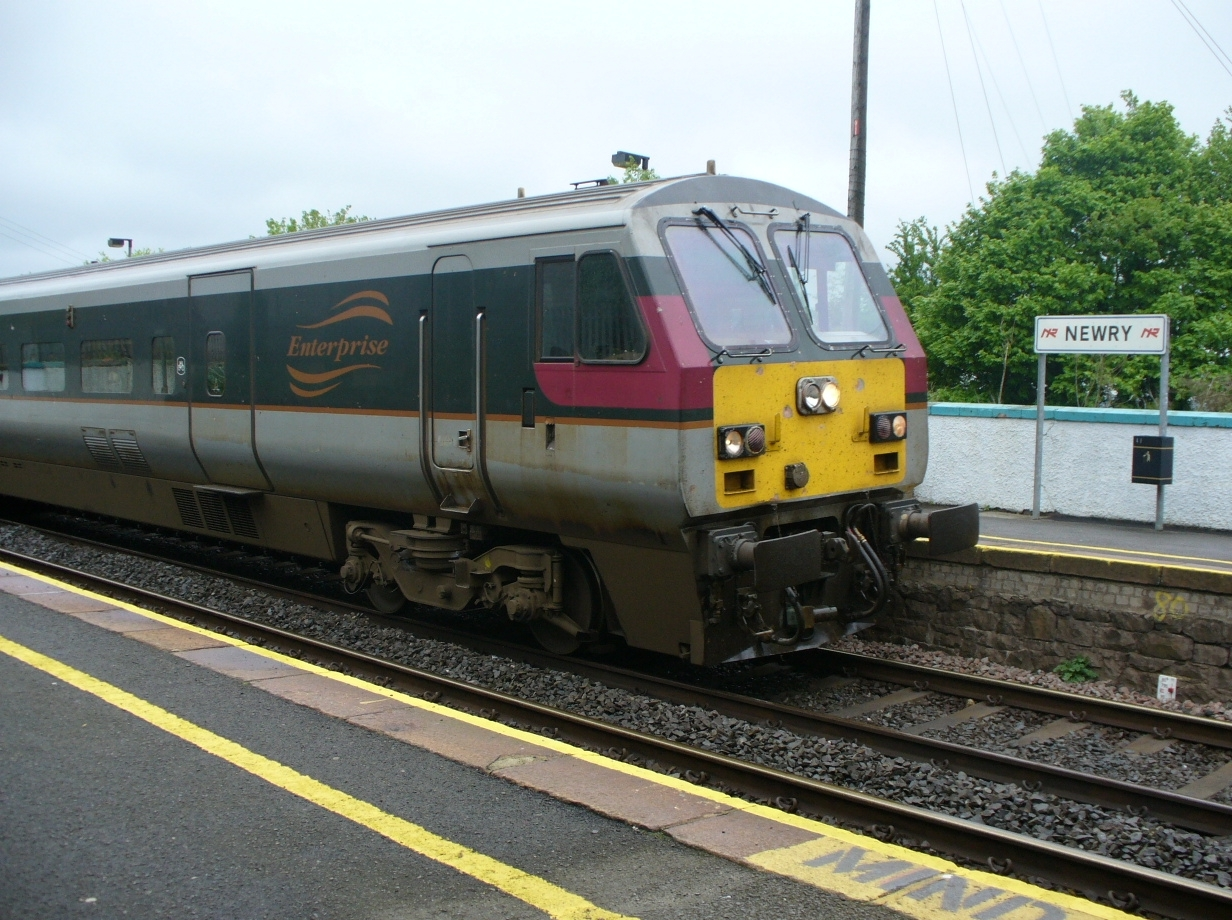
Enterprise train arrives at Newry on a Dublin bound service in 2006

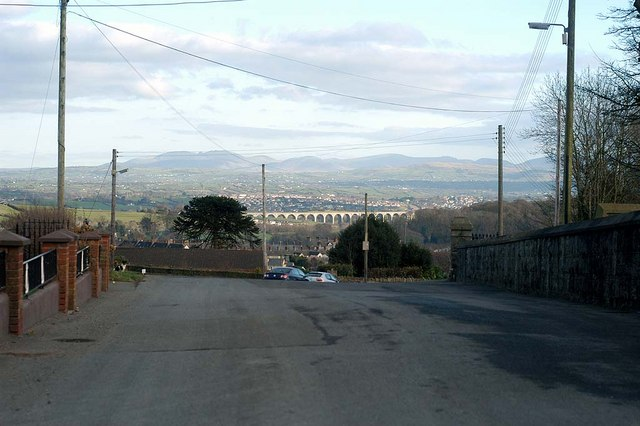
Craigmore Viaduct with the Mournes in the distance, seen from Bessbrook near Newry station

Former platform sign at Newry station

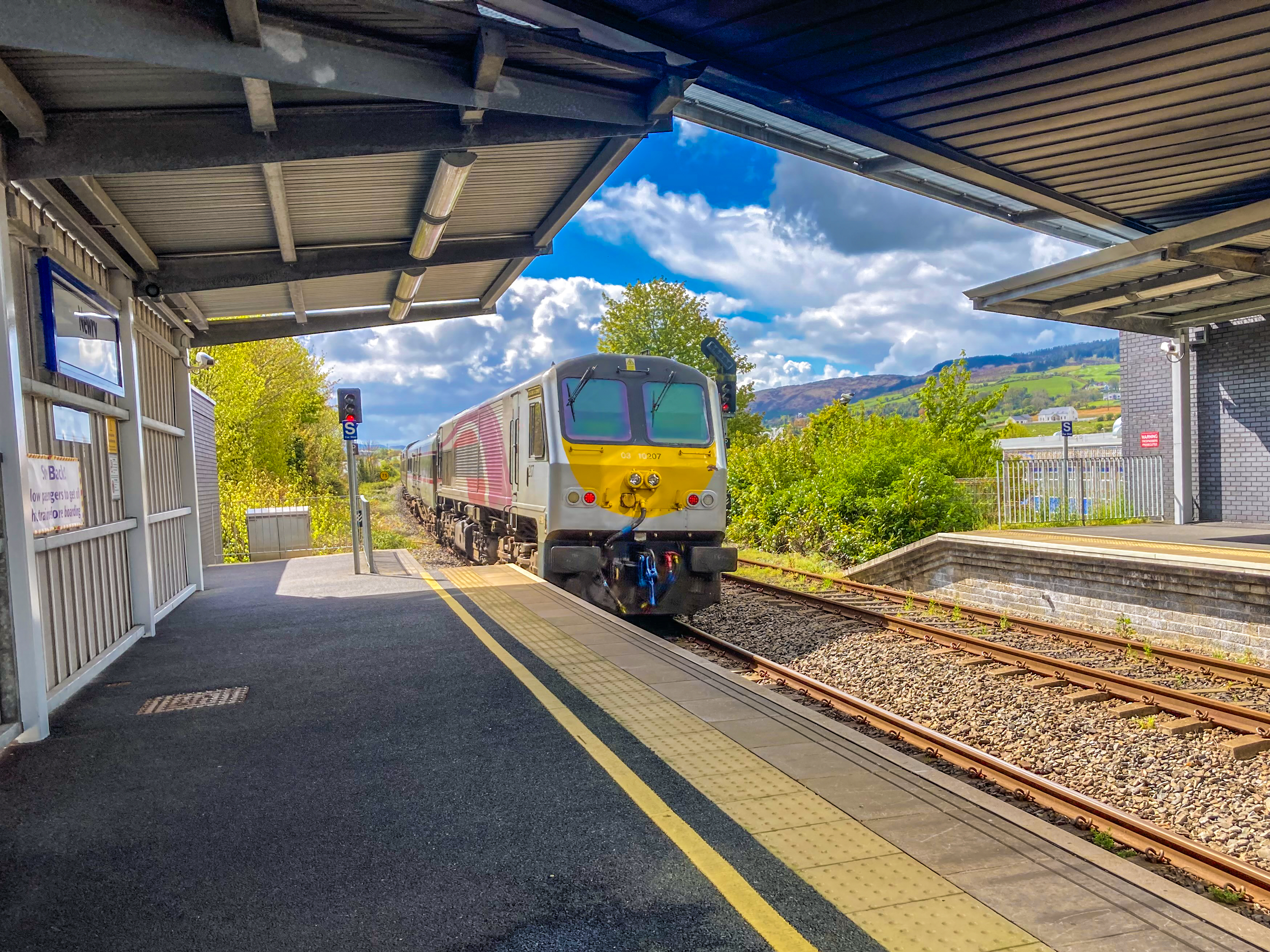
The modern day Enterprise departing Newry station

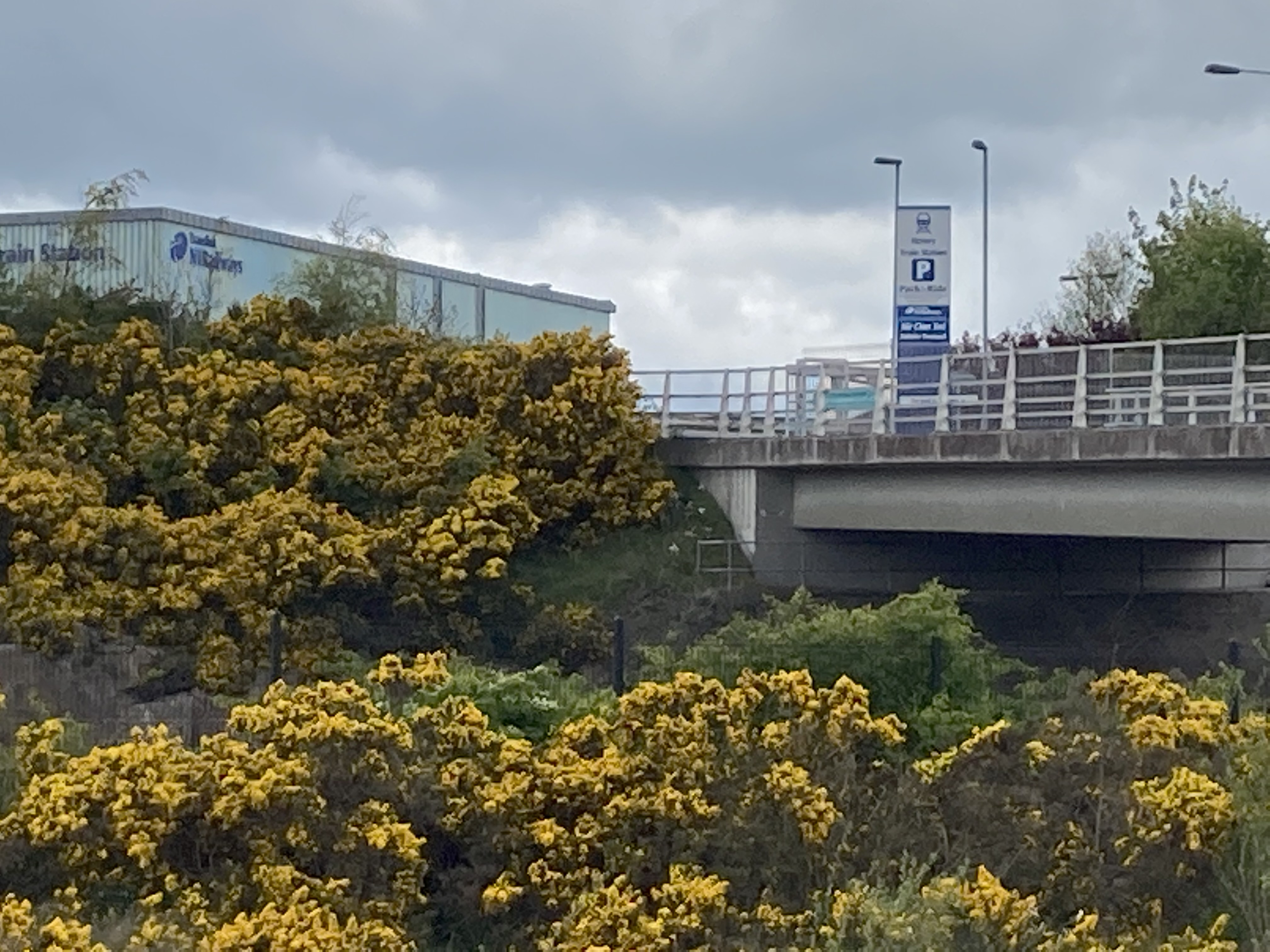
Station entrance

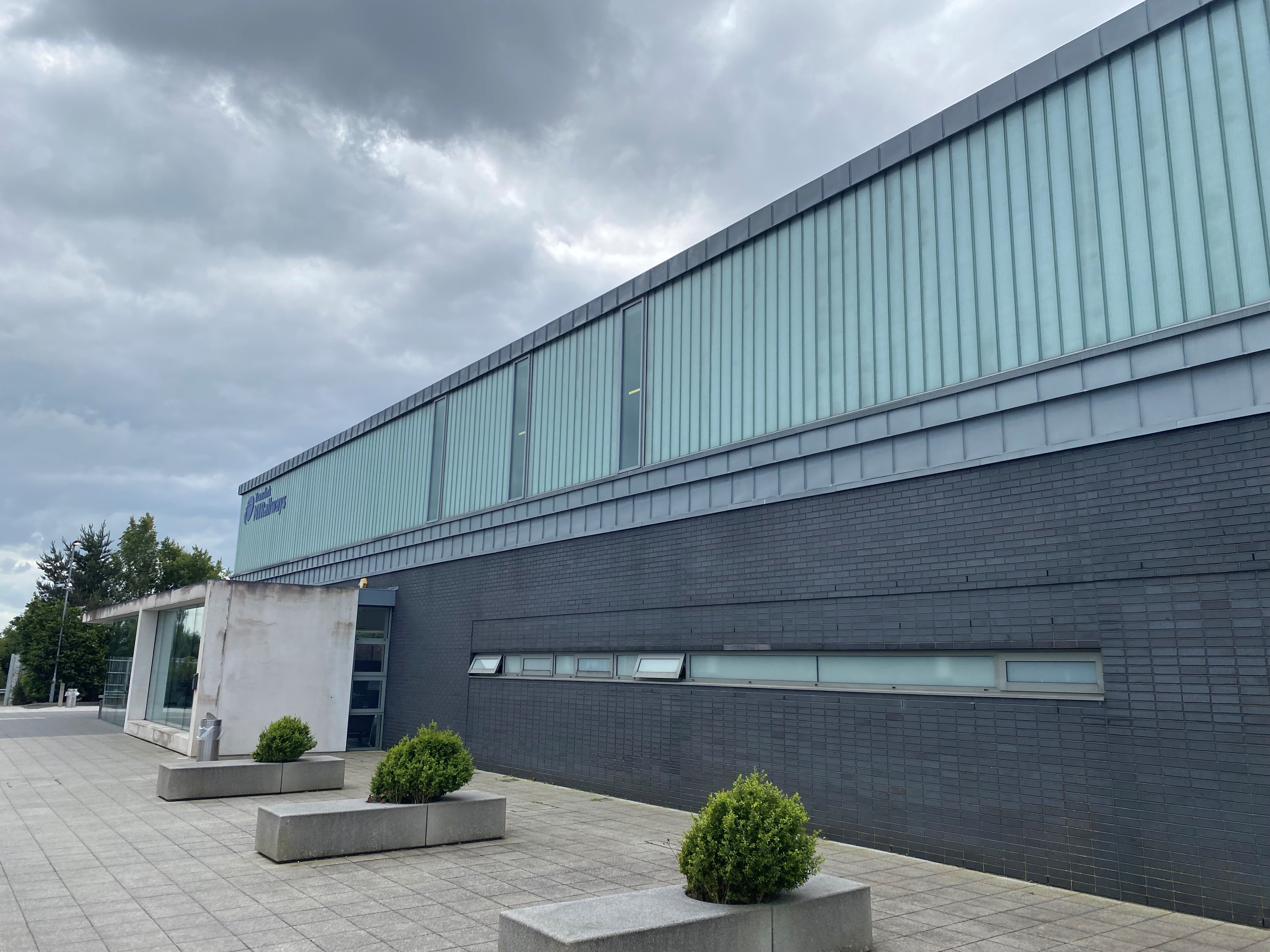
Station building (2024)

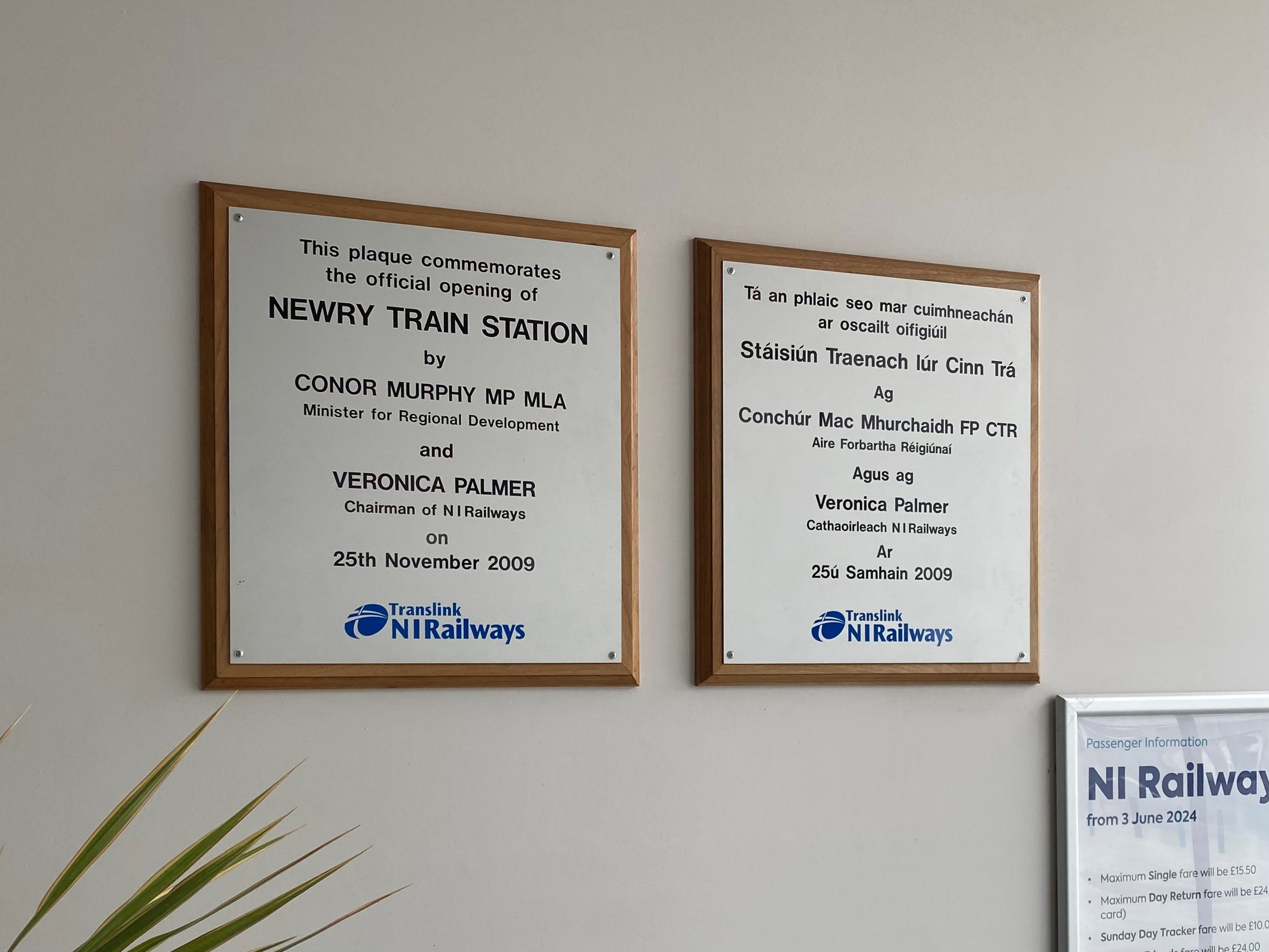
Wall plaques commemorating the opening of the new station building in 2009
