= Edgeworthstown railway station =

Station in County Longford, Ireland

Edgeworthstown Meathas Troim
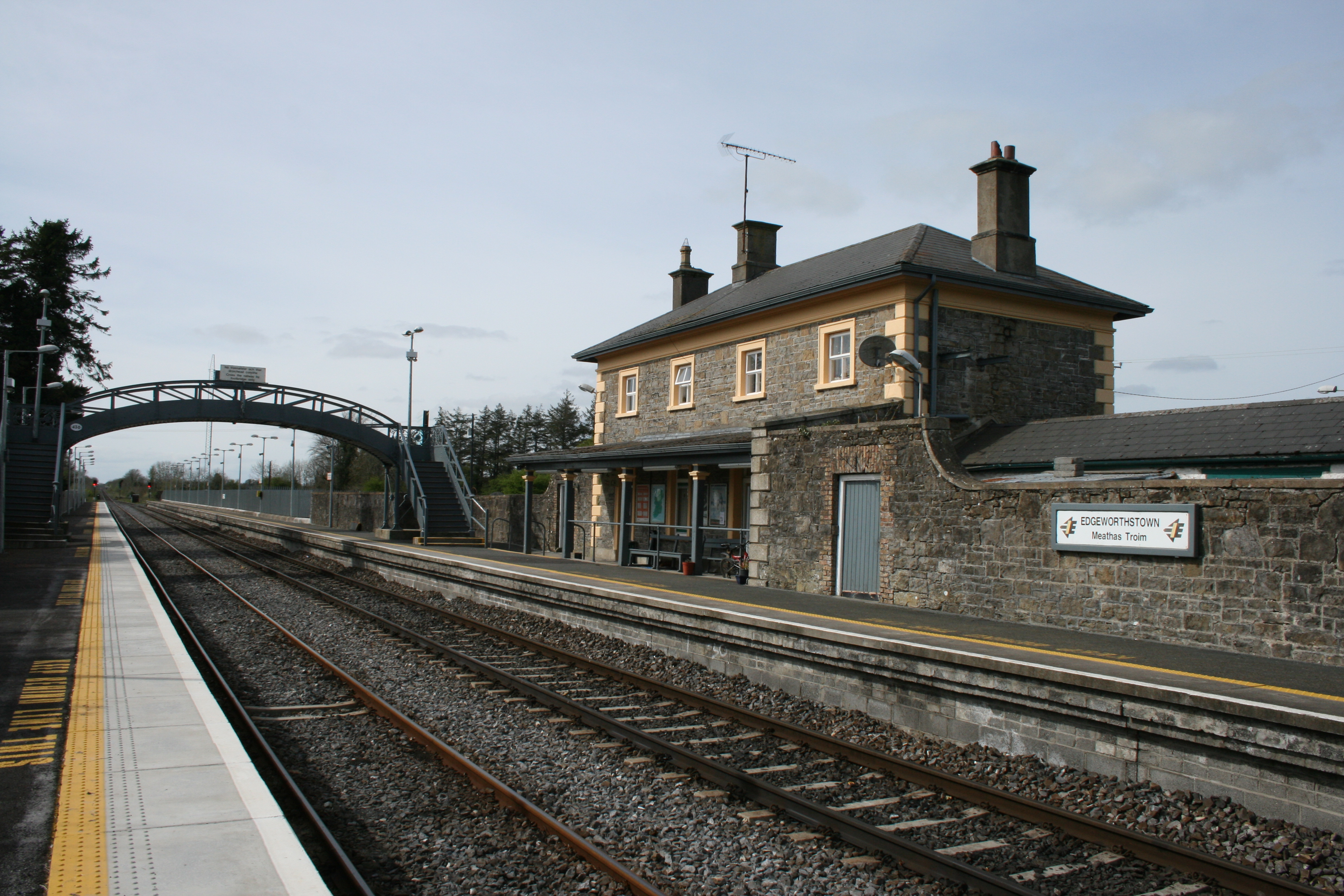
- Edgeworthstown/Mostrim railway station

General information
- Location: Hughes' Station House, Edgeworthstown; County Longford, N39 R791; Ireland
- Coordinates: 53.6886°N 7.6026°W
- Operator: Iarnród Éireann
- Platforms: 2

Construction
- Structure type: At-grade

Other information
- Station code: ETOWN
- Fare zone: J

Key dates
- 1855: Station opened
Location

Edgeworthstown railway station serves the town of Edgeworthstown (Mostrim) in County Longford, Ireland.

Edgeworthstown station is served by national rail company Iarnród Éireann's Dublin to Sligo InterCity service and Dublin to Longford Western Commuter service.

== History ==
The station opened on 8 November 1855.

It was formerly called "Mostrim railway station", from an anglicisation of the town's Irish language name, but this fell out of official usage by the 1990s.

== Ticketing ==
Cheaper tickets can be purchased in advance, online at http://www.irishrail.ie. These can be collected from one of the two ticket vending machines at the station entrance. Tickets may also be purchased at full price before departure from these machines, or from the booking office if it is open.

== See also ==
- List of railway stations in Ireland

Preceding station	Iarnród Éireann	Following station
Mullingar	InterCity; Dublin-Sligo	Longford
Mullingar	Commuter; Western Commuter	Longford
