= Monaghan railway station =

Disused railway station in Ireland

Coordinates: 54.246°N 6.968°W

Monaghan
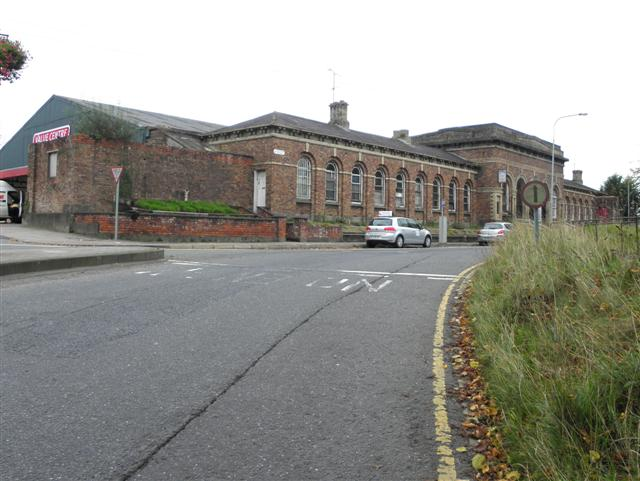
- Monaghan railway station photographed on 14 October 2011

General information
- Location: Monaghan, County Monaghan; Ireland

History
- Original company: Ulster Railway
- Post-grouping: Great Northern Railway (Ireland)

Key dates
- 2 March 1863: Station opens
- 1 October 1957: Station closes to passengers
- 1 June 1960: Station closes
Location

Monaghan railway station was on the Ulster Railway designed by Sir John Macneil located in the Republic of Ireland. It was part of the Great Northern Railway of Ireland railway system.

== History ==
The Ulster Railway opened the station on 2 March 1863. It closed to regular passenger traffic on 14 October 1957 but goods, mail and occasional passenger traffic continued until the end of 1959. After closure, CIÉ retained the site for use as a bus station.

An All-Island Strategic Rail Review, jointly commissioned by the Irish and Northern Irish governments and published in 2023, recommended the reopening of the station on a line between Mullingar and Portadown.

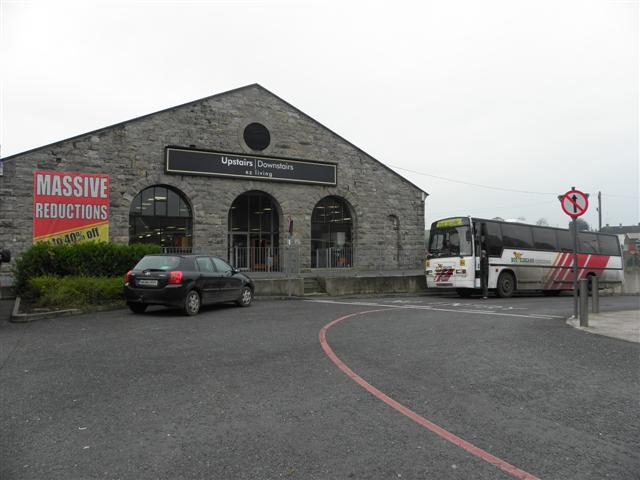
Monaghan railway goods shed, now a furniture store.

== Routes ==
Preceding station	Disused railways	Following station
Glaslough	Ulster Railway; Portadown to Clones	Smithborough
	Proposed Services	
Clones	All-Island Strategic Rail Review; Mullingar-Portadown Line	Armagh
