= Mullingar Racecourse =

Horse racing venue in County Westmeath, Ireland

Mullingar Racecourse was a horse racing venue in Mullingar, County Westmeath, Ireland. It was located at Newbrook about two miles to the southwest of Mullingar town centre alongside the disused Mullingar to Athlone railway line. The racecourse opened at the Newbrook site in 1852 following the completion of the Dublin to Mullingar railway line in 1848. It ceased to operate in 1967.

The racecourse was used as a filming location for the 1947 film Captain Boycott. Many local people took part as film extras in a horse racing sequence though some scenes were re-shot at Naas Racecourse.

The famous Irish steeplechaser Arkle made his racecourse debut here in December 1961 finishing third in the Lough Ennel Plate, a bumper

After its last meeting in July 1967 there were a number of attempts to revive horse racing at the Newbrook site. The most prominent was organised by the famous singer Joe Dolan who put together a syndicate to buy the racecourse and develop it into a multi-purpose venue capable of hosting concerts and conferences as well as race meetings. Eventually the racecourse site was sold in June 1972 to a local solicitor for £45,000. A year later it was sold on to the Industrial Development Authority for £150,000. On 30 June 1976 the GAF Materials Corporation opened a factory for manufacturing flooring products on the site. Today the site is an industrial estate occupied by many different businesses.
