= Adavoyle railway station =

Railway station in Northern Ireland

Adavoyle
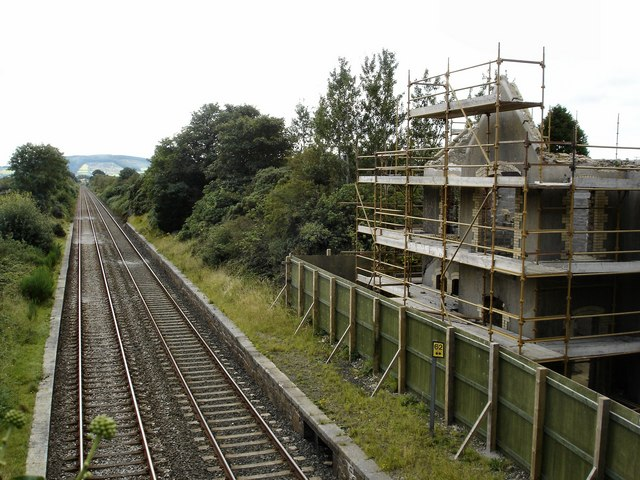
- Remains of Adavoyle railway station, photographed on 24 August 2007

General information
- Location: Station Road, Adavoyle, near Dromintee; County Armagh; Northern Ireland
- Coordinates: 54.10823°N 6.38665°W
- Line: Dublin–Belfast railway line

Construction
- Structure type: At-grade

History
- Original company: Great Northern Railway (Ireland)
- Pre-grouping: Great Northern Railway (Ireland)

Key dates
- 1892: Opened
- 1933: Closed

Historical railways
Preceding station	Historical railways	Following station
Dundalk; Line and station open	Great Northern Railway (Ireland); Belfast–Dublin	Bessbrook; Line open, station reopened as Newry
Route map
Location
- Location within Northern Ireland Location within island of Ireland

Adavoyle railway station was a railway station on the Dublin–Belfast railway line near Dromintee, County Armagh, Northern Ireland. It opened in 1892 and closed in 1933. The former station building is situated on Station Road, near the border with the Republic of Ireland.

The nearby townland of Aghadavoyle has the recorded Irish name Achadh an Dá Mhaoil.

== History ==
=== Opening and closure ===
The station opened in 1892 on the Belfast–Dublin main line, which had originally been constructed by the Dublin and Belfast Junction Railway. By the time Adavoyle opened, the line was operated by the Great Northern Railway (Ireland), formed in 1876 through the amalgamation of several Irish railway companies.

Adavoyle closed to passenger traffic in 1933, after approximately 41 years of operation. The Belfast–Dublin railway line remained in use after the station closed.

=== 1921 train derailment ===
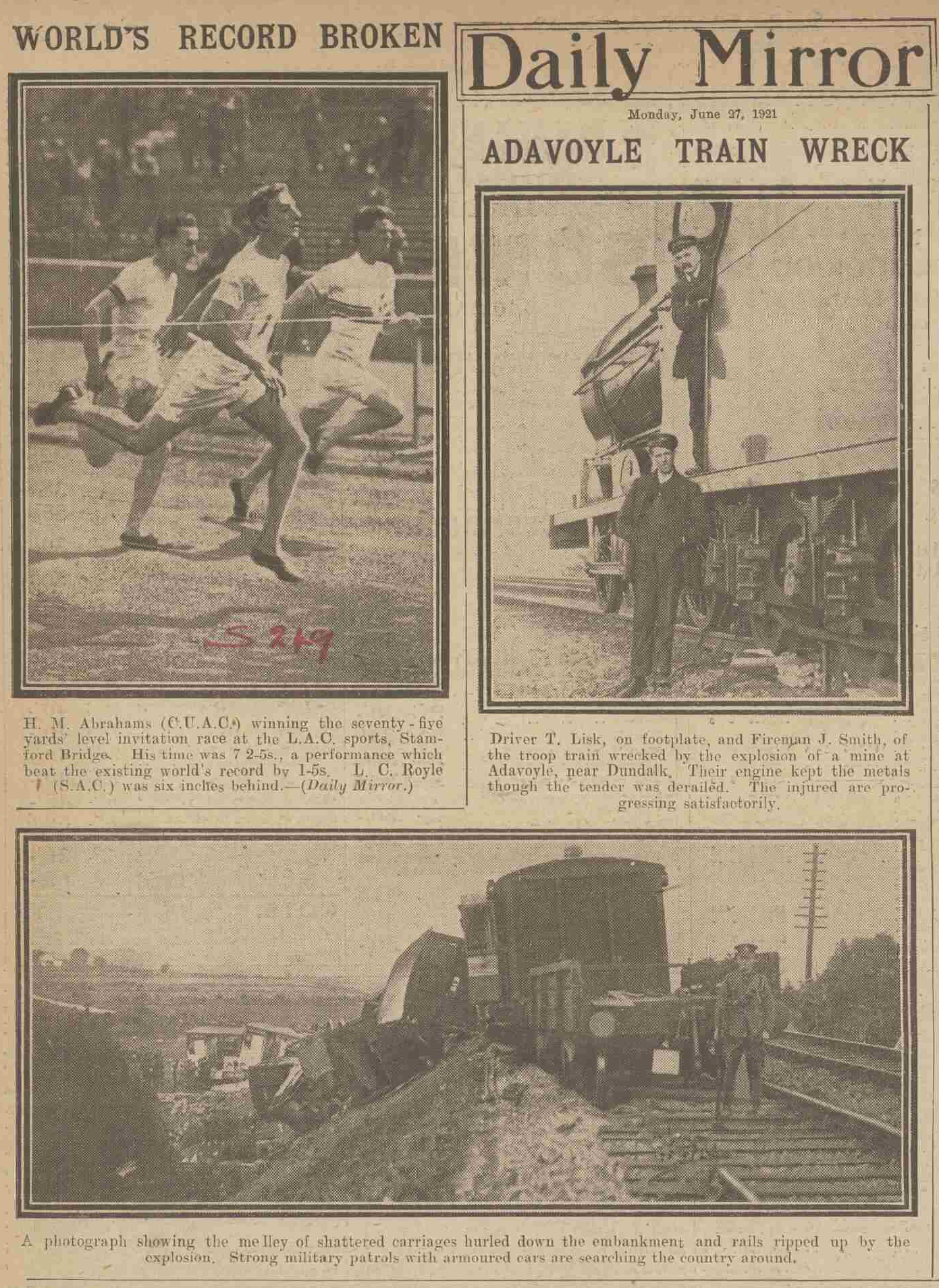
Photographs of the derailed train near Adavoyle, published in the Daily Mirror on 27 June 1921

On 24 June 1921, during the Irish War of Independence, members of the Irish Republican Army (IRA) derailed a British military train near Adavoyle. The train was carrying personnel of the 10th Royal Hussars and their horses south from Belfast, following their participation in the ceremonies surrounding the opening of the Parliament of Northern Ireland.

The attack has been attributed to the IRA's Fourth Northern Division, led by Frank Aiken. Several soldiers were killed and others wounded, while numerous horses also died. Historical accounts differ over the precise number of fatalities. A railway guard and a local farmer were also reported killed during the incident.

=== Éamon de Valera ===
The station was also associated with the removal of future Taoiseach Éamon de Valera from Northern Ireland in 1924.

De Valera had been arrested after entering Northern Ireland in defiance of an exclusion order. Following his release from Belfast Prison on 28 November 1924, he was taken under police escort to Adavoyle railway station, where he boarded a southbound train at approximately 9:15 a.m.

A photograph preserved in the Ulster Museum collection shows de Valera standing under police escort at Adavoyle station before his departure.

=== Station building ===
Following its closure, the former station building fell into disrepair. The station house, constructed in the late nineteenth century, stands beside the operational Belfast–Dublin railway line.

In March 2026, Newry, Mourne and Down District Council granted planning permission to convert the disused station building into a dwelling. The proposed redevelopment included restoration of the historic structure and the creation of residential facilities. The council's Historic Environment Division welcomed the proposed reuse of the building.

Rail services on the Belfast–Dublin main line, including the Enterprise, continue to pass the former station site without stopping.

== Modelling ==
Tony Miles began constructing his Adavoyle Junction model railway in 1963. It became an early example of large-scale use of P4 finescale modelling standards, depicting an imagined railway junction inspired by the Great Northern Railway (Ireland).

The model's railway network was fictionalised, incorporating additional GNR(I) branch lines towards Monaghan and Greenore, as well as a narrow-gauge line towards Inniskeen. These routes were elements of the model and did not represent actual railway branches originating at Adavoyle station.

A second version of the layout was begun in 1983. The original layout was subsequently returned to Ireland for restoration.
