= Glaslough railway station =

Railway station in Ireland

Glaslough

General information
- Location: Glaslough, County Monaghan; Ireland
- Coordinates: 54.316491°N 6.900671°W
- Elevation: 149 ft (45 m)
- Platforms: 2
- Tracks: 2

Construction
- Structure type: Tudor gothic style in dressed stone (extant)
- Architect: Alfred G.S. Clayton

History
- Original company: Ulster Railway
- Post-grouping: Great Northern Railway (Ireland)

Key dates
- 25 May 1858: Station opens
- 14 October 1957: Station closes to passengers
- 1 June 1958: Station closes
Location

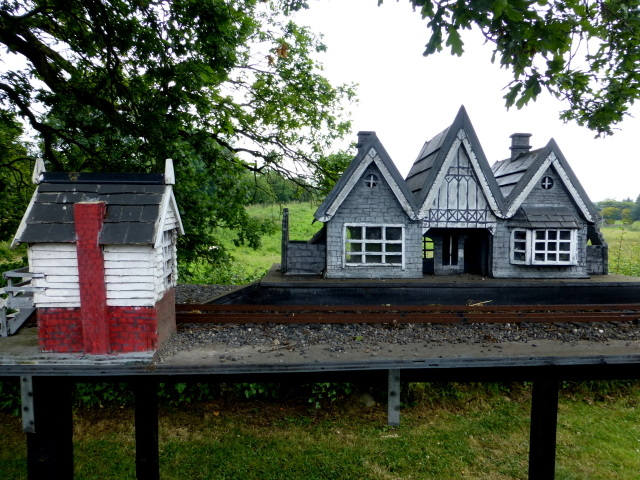
Model of Glaslough Railway Station

Glaslough railway station was on the Ulster Railway and is located in the Republic of Ireland. Upon the Partition of Ireland in 1921 it became the first station south of the border on the line.

== History ==
The Ulster Railway opened the station on 25 May 1858.

It is understood to have been one of the first in Ireland with flushing toilets.

The line closed to passengers in the republic on 14 October 1957 following the closure of the cross-border lines in the north. Glaslough became the northern terminus for nearly 9 months until it was closed on the 1 June 1958 and Monaghan became the terminus until the line's closure the year afterwards. Some station building remain but are used for other purposes and the signal box has been reconstructed on the site.

== Routes ==
Preceding station	Disused railways	Following station
Tynan and Caledon	Ulster Railway; Portadown to Clones	Monaghan
