= Newry and Armagh Railway =

Former railway company in Northern Ireland

The Newry and Armagh Railway, initially the Newry and Enniskillen Railway, was opened in 1864 and ran until 1879.

== Stations and line description ==
=== Armagh ===
The Newry and Armagh Railway (N&A) opened in 1864, and had its own temporary terminus just outside Armagh until it started using the Ulster Railway of Armagh railway station in 1865. In 1876 the Ulster Railway became part of the new Great Northern Railway (GNR), which took over the N&A in 1879. The Government of Northern Ireland made the GNR Board close the remaining lines serving Armagh on 1 October 1957. Government Minister for the Department for Regional Development, Danny Kennedy MLA indicates railway restoration plans.

=== Hamiltonsbawn ===
Hamiltonsbawn railway station opened on 25 August 1864 and finally closed on 1 February 1933. Hamiltonsbawn was the scene of the Armagh railway disaster which happened on 12 June 1889 near Armagh, Ulster, Ireland, when a crowded Sunday school excursion train had to negotiate a steep incline; the steam locomotive was unable to complete the climb and the train stalled. Much later at the time of closure the line was run by the Great Northern Railway (Ireland).

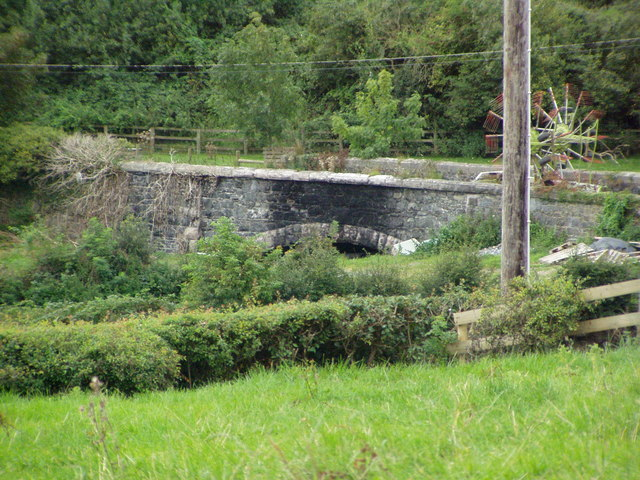
A disused railway bridge in Hamiltonsbawn with evidence of soot from the steam trains as used by the GNR (I).

=== Markethill ===
Markethill railway station opened on 25 August 1864, closed for passenger traffic on 1 February 1933 and finally closed altogether on 2 May 1955. Located on the Armagh to Goraghwood section of line run by the Great Northern Railway of Ireland.

Lissummon Railway Tunnel 1,608m 1759 yd long constructed with stone with some brick in the early 1860s.

=== Gorraghwood ===
Goraghwood railway station was opened on 6 March 1854 on the Dublin and Belfast Junction Railway where a junction existed on the present day Belfast-Newry railway line. In 1875, the D&BJct merged with the D&B, forming the Northern Railway of Ireland. In 1876 it merged with the Irish North Western Railway (INW) and Ulster Railway to form the Great Northern Railway (Ireland).

The station at Goraghwood railway station connected with the Dundalk, Newry and Greenore Railway via Newry Edward Street railway station in Newry.

By the 1950s the GNRI had ceased to be profitable and in 1953 the company was jointly nationalised by the governments of the Republic of Ireland and Northern Ireland. The two governments ran the railway jointly under a Great Northern Railway Board until 1958 then being absorbed into the Ulster Transport Authority. Goraghwood was closed by the Ulster Transport Authority in 1965 closing to passengers on 15 February 1965 and previously to freight on 4 January 1965. Presently trains run Northern Ireland Railways pass the closed station as well as the Enterprise.
