= Belfast Central Railway =

Railway company in Northern Ireland

- Industry: Railway
- Founded: 1864
- Defunct: 1885
- Fate: Acquired
- Successor: Great Northern Railway (Ireland)
- Headquarters: Belfast, Northern Ireland
- Area served: Belfast

Belfast Central Railway Act 1872
- Act of Parliament
- Parliament of the United Kingdom
- Long title: An Act for authorising the Belfast Central Railway Company to make new Railways; for regulating their Capital; and for conferring further powers on the Company; and other purposes.
- Citation: 35 & 36 Vict. c. clxxi

Dates
- Royal assent: 6 August 1872

Text of statute as originally enacted

The Belfast Central Railway (BCR) was a railway company operating in Belfast, Northern Ireland. The company was incorporated by the Belfast Central Railway Act 1864 (27 & 28 Vict. c. ccliv) and acquired by the Great Northern Railway (Ireland) in 1885.

== History ==
The Belfast Central Railway was built in 1875 to connect the three railway lines in Belfast (the Ulster Railway, the Belfast and County Down Railway (BCDR) and the Belfast and Northern Counties Railway (BNCR)). It branched off from the Ulster Railway (later the Great Northern Railway (Ireland) (GNRI) at Ulster Junction, and ran for 1 1/2 miles to Queen's Bridge, with a branch from East Bridge Street Junction to the BCDR at Ballymacarrett Junction. A link to the BNCR was built later, via a tunnel under Queen's Bridge to the dock board railway at Donegall Quay Junction which, in turn, connected to the BNCR. This was used for goods only.

Belfast Central Railway (Sale) Act 1885
- Act of Parliament
- Parliament of the United Kingdom
- Long title: An Act to authorise the Sale of the existing undertaking of the Belfast Central Railway Company to the Great Northern Railway Company (Ireland).
- Citation: 48 & 49 Vict. c. clxxvii

Dates
- Royal assent: 6 August 1885

By 1885 the Belfast Central Railway had become unviable as a company due to increasing competition from the city's trams, and so it was acquired by the GNRI, the sale being authorised by the Belfast Central Railway (Sale) Act 1885 (48 & 49 Vict. c. clxxvii). On 30 November of that year passenger services were withdrawn and Ormeau station was closed. Queen's Bridge station was demolished in 1960 and the lines from East Bridge Street Junction to Donegall Quay Junction and Ballymacarrett Junction were closed in 1963 and 1965 respectively by the Ulster Transport Authority (UTA).

In the 1970s however, the Belfast Central line from Belfast Central Junction (formerly Ulster Junction) to Ballymacarrett Junction was relaid, and reopened along with a new Belfast Central railway station on 12 April 1976.

== Locomotives ==
Number	Type	Builder	Built	Scrapped	Notes
1	0-6-0ST	Black, Hawthorn & Company	1868	1894	Inherited by GNR(I) in 1885. Renumbered to no. 93.
2	0-6-0ST	Black, Hawthorn & Company	1874	1895	Inherited by GNR(I) in 1885. Renumbered to no. 94.
3	2-4-0T	Beyer, Peacock & Company	1878	1898	Inherited by GNR(I) in 1885. Renumbered to no. 95.
4	4-4-0T	Beyer, Peacock & Company	1880	1950	Inherited by GNR(I) in 1885. Renumbered to no. 96, then no. 96A in 1906 and no. 195 in 1913.
5	0-4-2	Sharp, Stewart & Company	1878	1905	Initially owned by Newry and Armagh Railway. Sold in 1880 to J. B. Cooper (manager of BCR). Bought by BCR in 1883. Sold in 1886 to BNCR. Renumbered at purchase to no. 50, then in 1887 to no. 9 and no. 9A in 1904.
