= Retreat Halt railway station =

Railway station in Northern Ireland

Retreat Halt

General information
- Location: County Armagh, Northern Ireland; UK
- Coordinates: 54.3865°N 6.6039°W

History
- Opened: 1 November 1936; 89 years ago
- Closed: 1 October 1957; 68 years ago
- Original company: Great Northern Railway (Ireland)
- Post-grouping: Great Northern Railway (Ireland)
Location

Retreat Halt railway station was on the Great Northern Railway (Ireland) in Northern Ireland.

The Great Northern Railway (Ireland) opened the station on 1 November 1936. It closed on 10 October 1957. As of 2014, it was reported that there was a potential to reopen several railway lines in Northern Ireland, including the Portadown to Armagh section.

== Routes ==
Preceding station	Disused railways	Following station
Richhill	Great Northern Railway (Ireland); Portadown to Clones	Armagh
