= Mullingar railway station =

Station in County Westmeath, Ireland

Mullingar An Muileann gCearr
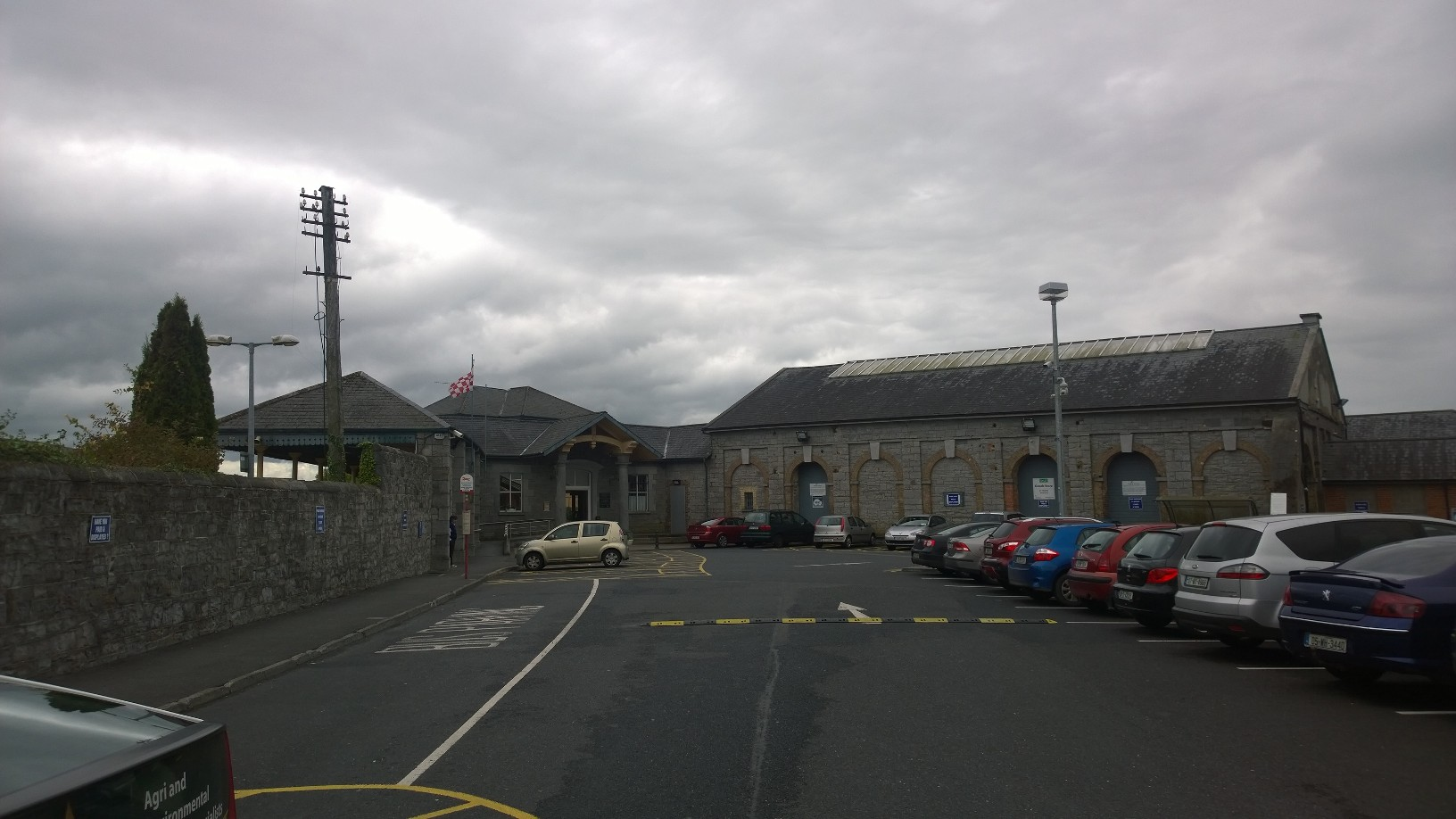
- A view of the train station and its adjacent carpark, 2015

General information
- Location: Clonmore Road, Mullingar; County Westmeath, N91 HKR4; Ireland
- Coordinates: 53°31′23″N 7°20′46″W
- System: Intercity and Commuter railway station
- Operator: Iarnród Éireann
- Lines: Dublin–Sligo; Western Commuter (City)
- Platforms: 3
- Bus operators: Bernard Kavanagh & Sons; Bus Éireann; TFI Local Link
- Connections: 70; 115; 115C; 115X; 167; 816; 818; 819; MU1

Construction
- Structure type: At-grade
- Architect: John Skipton Mulvany

Other information
- Station code: MLGAR
- Fare zone: G

History
- Opened: 2 October 1848; 177 years ago
Route map
Location

Mullingar railway station serves the town of Mullingar in County Westmeath, Ireland; it is situated 50 miles 17 chains (80.8 km) from Dublin, (Note: Distances are measured from the MGWR's original Broadstone terminus.) and 84 miles (135 km) from Sligo. Mullingar station is served by national rail company Iarnród Éireann's Dublin to Longford Commuter service and Dublin to Sligo InterCity service.

== History ==
The station was designed by architect John Skipton Mulvany and opened on 2 October 1848. The Midland Great Western Railway line to Mullingar from Dublin opened in stages from 1846 to 1848, arriving in Mullingar on 2 October 1848. This was to a temporary station, adjacent to the greyhound stadium. The original main line ran from Dublin (Broadstone) to Galway via Mullingar and Athlone, the Mullingar to Galway section opening in August 1851. The present station opened with the branch line to Longford on 14 December 1855. There were two secondary stations in Mullingar. Canal Crossing cattle bank was on the Sligo Line. On the Athlone Line, Newbrook racecourse had its own station. This was unique in that it was a two platformed station with both platforms on the Down Line.

== Services ==
=== Train services ===
The railway line connecting Mullingar to Athlone, once integral to the Midland Great Western Railway's Dublin to Galway route, has been out of service since 1987. In the mid-2000s, there were discussions about reopening this line to enhance Dublin-Galway rail services; however, these plans were eventually set aside in favour of developing a cycling route.

This cycling route, known as the Dublin–Galway Greenway, includes a section from Mullingar to Athlone that repurposes the disused railway line. The Moate to Garrycastle segment was officially opened in October 2015, and a new bridge over the River Shannon in Athlone was completed in August 2023.

In 2024, the All-Island Strategic Rail Review revisited the idea of reinstating the rail link between Mullingar and Athlone. The review recommended re-establishing a single-track line between these towns, with a projected opening date between 2040 and 2050. Additionally, it proposed a single-track line connecting Mullingar to Portadown via Armagh, Monaghan, Clones, and Cavan, aiming to improve connectivity between the midlands and place such Belfast Grand Central and Derry~Londonderry.

Today Mullingar station operates to services both commuter and Intercity services to Sligo Mac Diarmada, Longford, and Dublin Connolly, Mullingar railway station offers connections to several other destinations such as Docklands and M3 Parkway. These services are operated by Iarnród Éireann.

Preceding station	Iarnród Éireann	Following station
Enfield	InterCity; Dublin-Sligo	Edgeworthstown
Enfield	Commuter; Western Commuter	Edgeworthstown or Terminus
	Disused railways	
Killucan; Line open, station closed	Midland Great Western Railway; Dublin-Sligo	Clonhugh; Line open, station closed
Killucan; Line open, station closed	Midland Great Western Railway; Dublin-Galway	Moate; Line and station closed
	Proposed Services	
Terminus	All-Island Strategic Rail Review; Mullingar-Portadown Line	Cavan
Terminus	All-Island Strategic Rail Review; Mullingar-Athlone Line	Athlone

=== Bus services ===
Mullingar railway station is by several bus routes, providing connections to multiple destinations. Bus Éireann routes 70, 115, 115C, 167 terminate at the station, connecting the station to Athlone, Dublin, Dundalk, and Drogheda. Additionally, the TFI Local Link service operates route 819 connecting Mullingar to Castlepollard via Collinstown, with multiple daily return services.

== Facilities ==
The station has three operative platforms, and two platforms on the line to Athlone which are not in use. The two disused platforms are on the disused Athlone line. Within the station are ticket machines, a ticket office and restrooms. The station is equipped with passenger shelters and an enclosed waiting room. As of 2024, this waiting room is opened on weekdays from 05:30 to 21:30, on Saturdays from 07:30 to 21:30, and on Sundays from 08:30 to 22:00.

The station has a paid car park, operated by APCOA, with 152 spaces, including 5 designated for disabled parking and 2 equipped with electric car charging services.

== RPSI base ==
The Railway Preservation Society of Ireland (RPSI) has a secondary base in the town. A turntable remains here used by steam locomotives a couple of times a year.

== Gallery ==
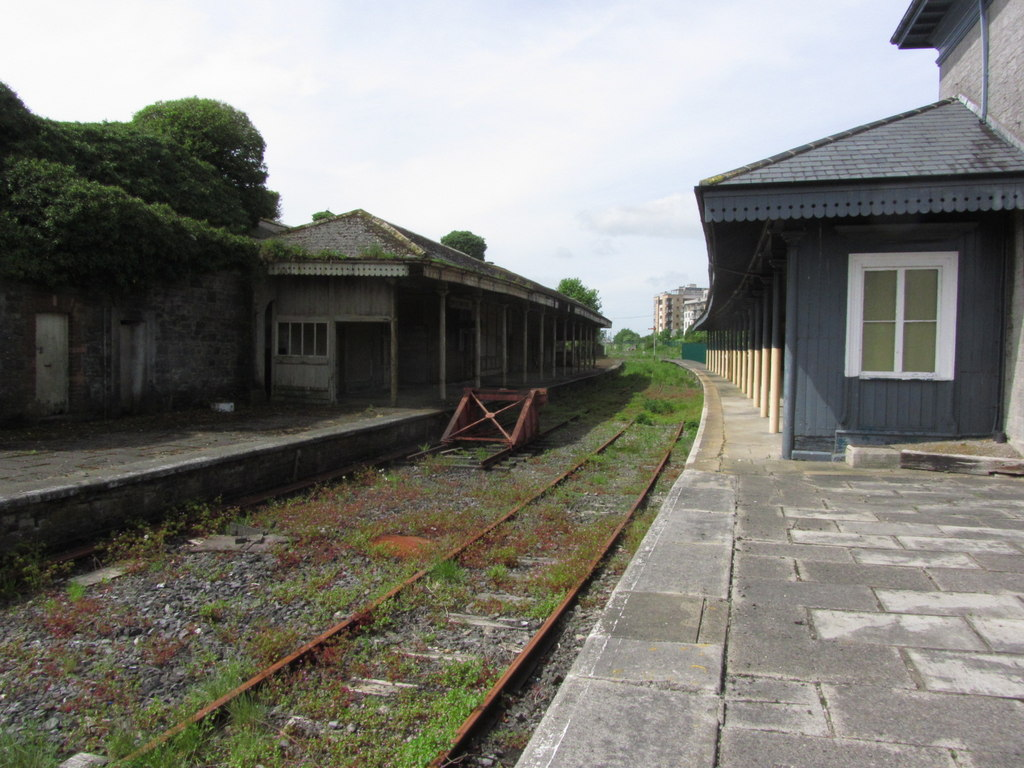
Disused arm of Mullingar Station

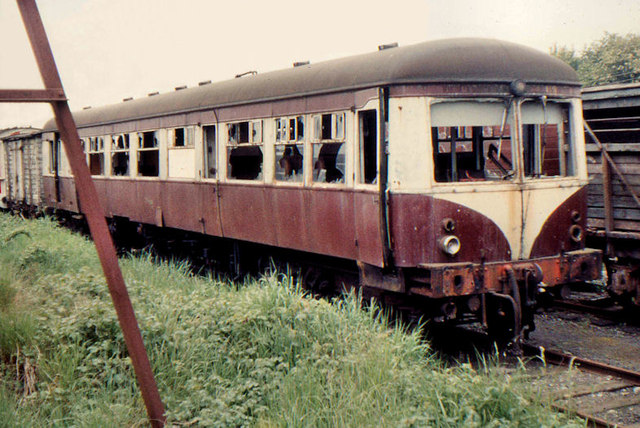
NIR scrap railcar, Mullingar

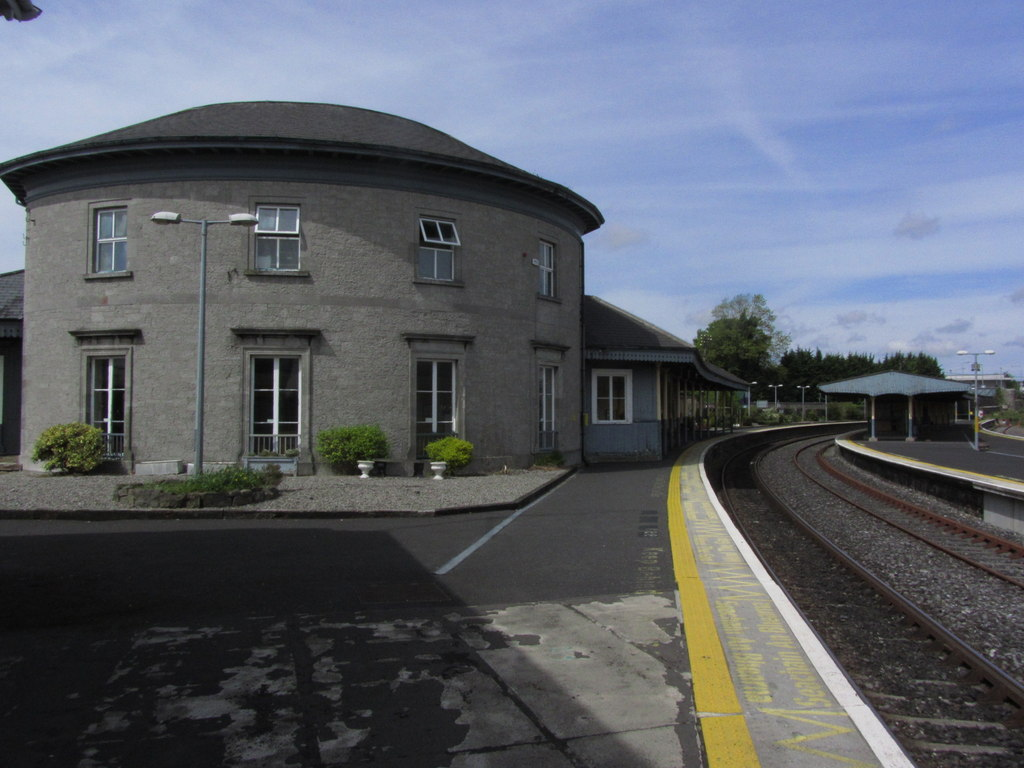
Mullingar Station

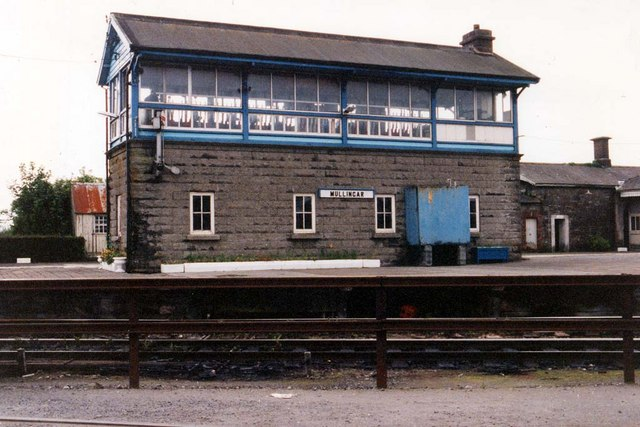
Signal box

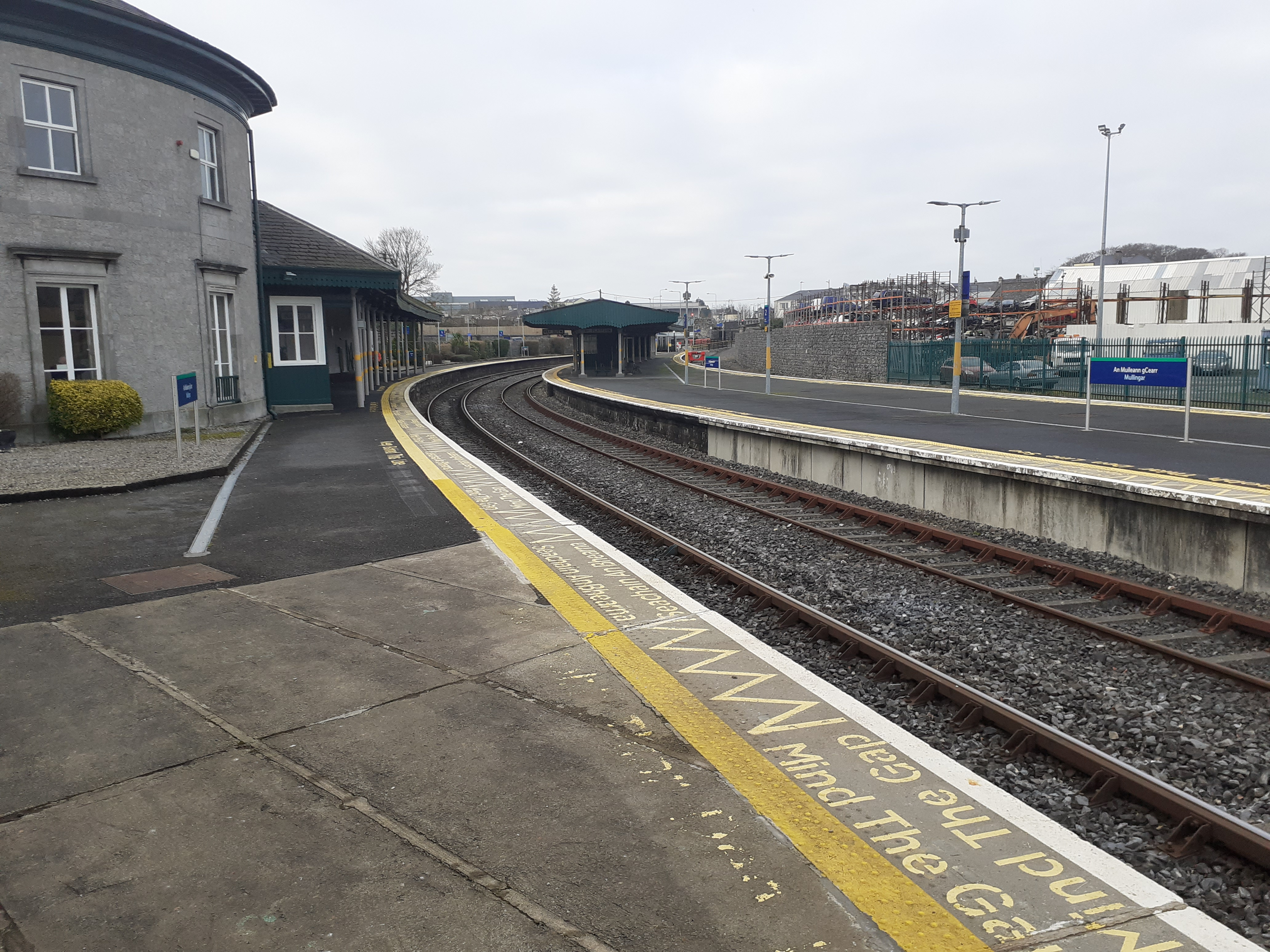
Mullingar train station (2022)

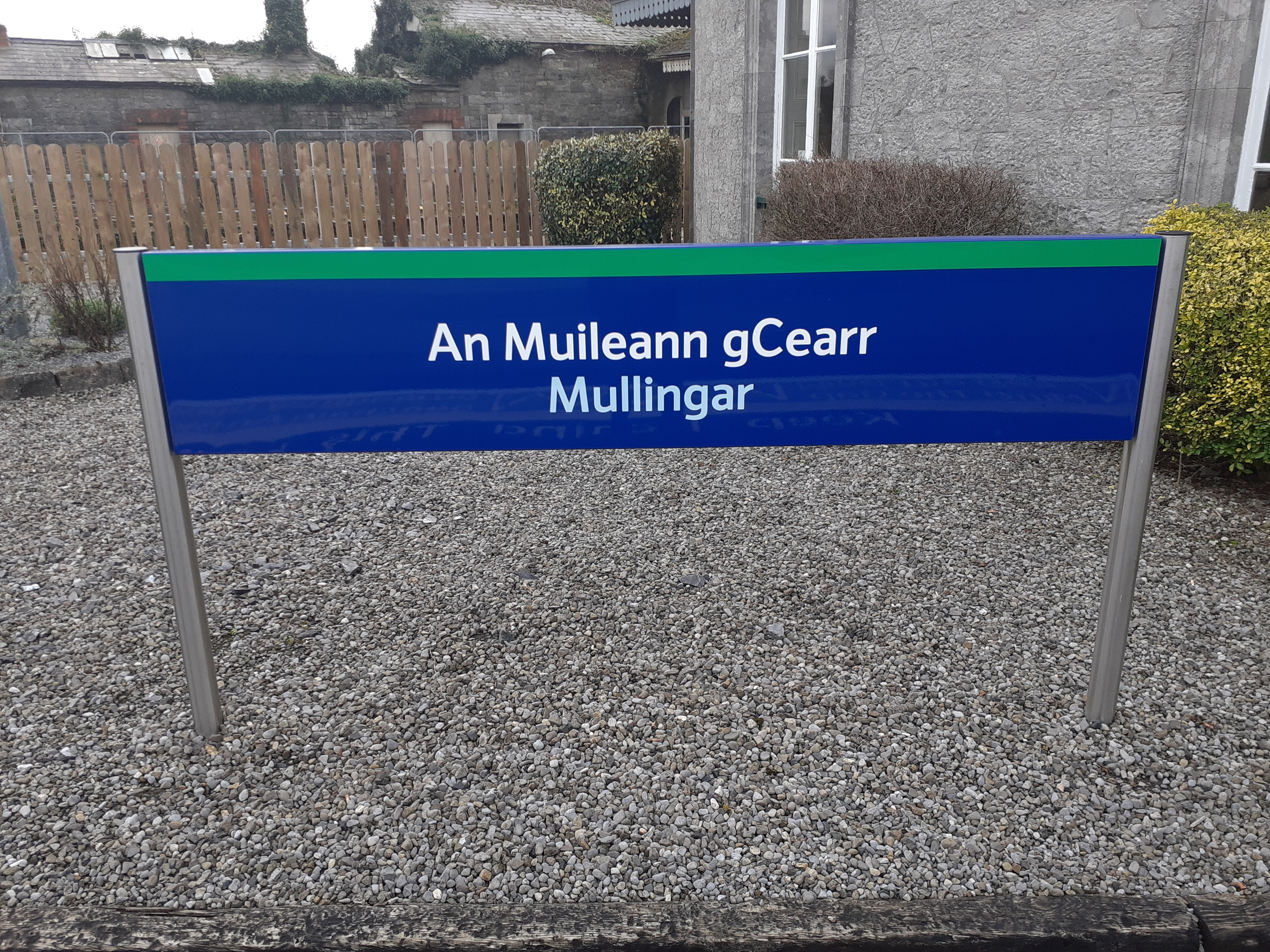
Bilingual sign at the station (2022)

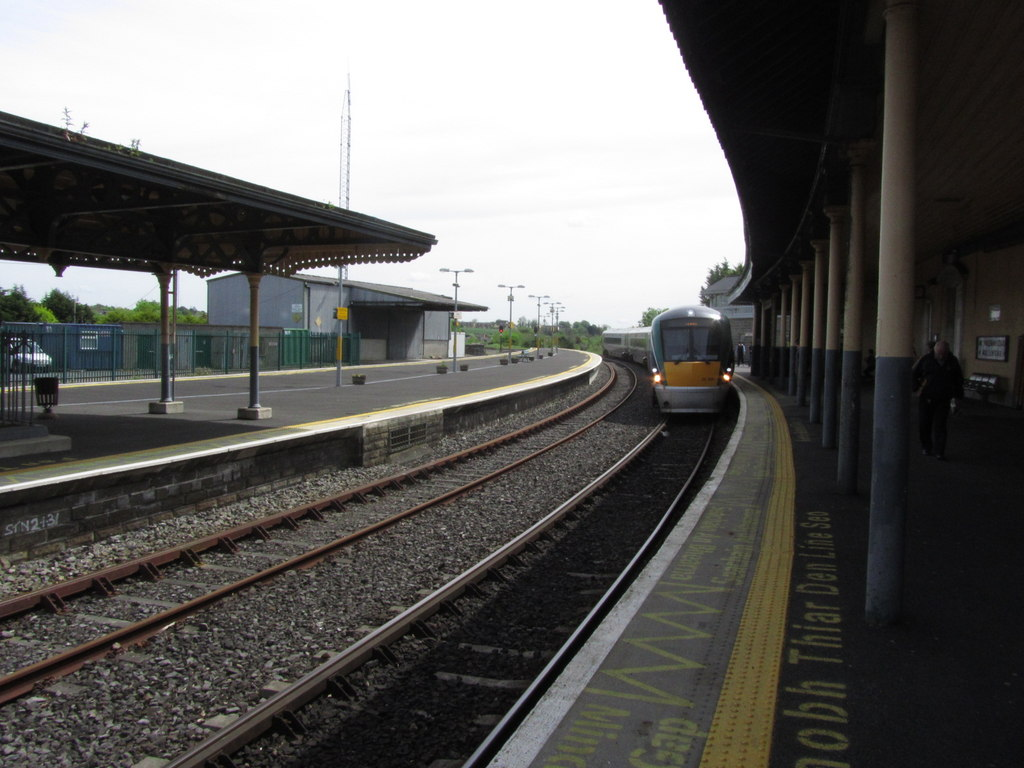
Sligo bound train entering Mullingar Station

== See also ==
- List of railway stations in Ireland
- Sligo-Dublin line
