= Ulster Railway =

Former railway from Belfast to Cavan and Monaghan in Ireland

- Industry: railway
- Founded: 1836
- Defunct: 1876
- Fate: merged
- Successor: Great Northern Railway (Ireland)
- Headquarters: Belfast, Ireland
- Area served: County Antrim, County Armagh, County Down, County Monaghan

The Ulster Railway was a railway company operating in Ulster, Ireland. The company was incorporated in 1836 and merged with two other railway companies in 1876 to form the Great Northern Railway (Ireland).

== History ==
Ulster Railway Act 1836
- Act of Parliament
- Parliament of the United Kingdom
- Long title: An Act for making a Railway from the Town of Belfast to the City of Armagh in the Province of Ulster in Ireland.
- Citation: 6 & 7 Will. 4. c. xxxiii

Dates
- Royal assent: 19 May 1836

Text of statute as originally enacted

The Ulster Railway was authorised by the Ulster Railway Act 1836 (6 & 7 Will. 4. c. xxxiii), an act of the UK Parliament, and construction began in March 1837.

The first 7 miles 60 chains (12.5 km) of line, between Belfast Great Victoria Street and Lisburn, were completed in August 1839 at a cost of £107,602 11s. 5d. The line was extended in stages, opening to Lurgan in 1841, Portadown in 1842, and Armagh in 1848.

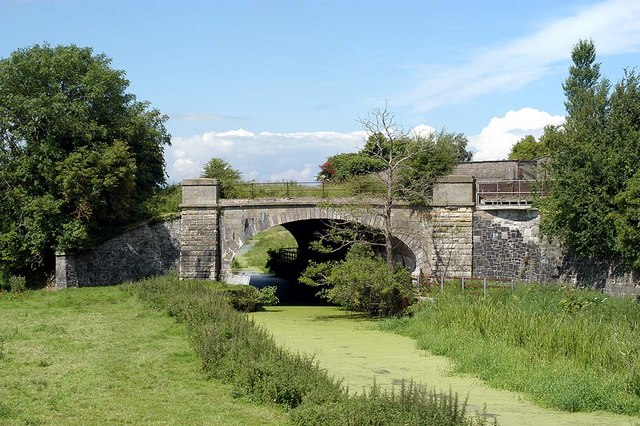
Crossing the Lagan Canal by the Ulster Railway near Moira.

In 1836 a Railway Commission recommended that railways in Ireland be built to 6 ft 2 in (1,880 mm) broad gauge. The Ulster Railway complied with this recommendation but the Dublin and Drogheda Railway (D&D) did not. In order for Dublin and Belfast to be linked without a break-of-gauge, in 1846 the UK Parliament passed an Act adopting a compromise gauge of 5 ft 3 in (1,600 mm) for Ireland, to which the Ulster Railway's track was then re-laid.

Extension of the Ulster Railway resumed, reaching Monaghan in 1858, Smithborough in 1862 and Clones on the Dundalk and Enniskillen Railway, later the Irish North Western Railway (INW), in 1863.

The Dublin and Belfast Junction Railway (D&BJct) between Drogheda and Portadown was completed in 1853. This connected the D&D with the Ulster Railway, thus completing the main line between Dublin and Belfast.

The Ulster Railway operated three lines that remained in the ownership of separate companies: the Portadown, Dungannon and Omagh Junction Railway (PD&O), the Banbridge, Lisburn and Belfast Railway (BLBR) and the Dublin and Antrim Junction Railway (D&AJR). The PD&O reached Dungannon in 1858 and Omagh in 1861, and the contractor, William Dargan, sold the Ulster a 999-year lease on it in 1860. The BLBR opened between Knockmore Junction and Banbridge in 1863, and the D&AJR opened between Knockmore Junction and Antrim in 1871.

In 1876 the Ulster Railway merged with the INW and the Northern Railway of Ireland (formed by a merger of the D&D and the D&BJct the previous year) to form the Great Northern Railway (Ireland).

== Preserved stock ==
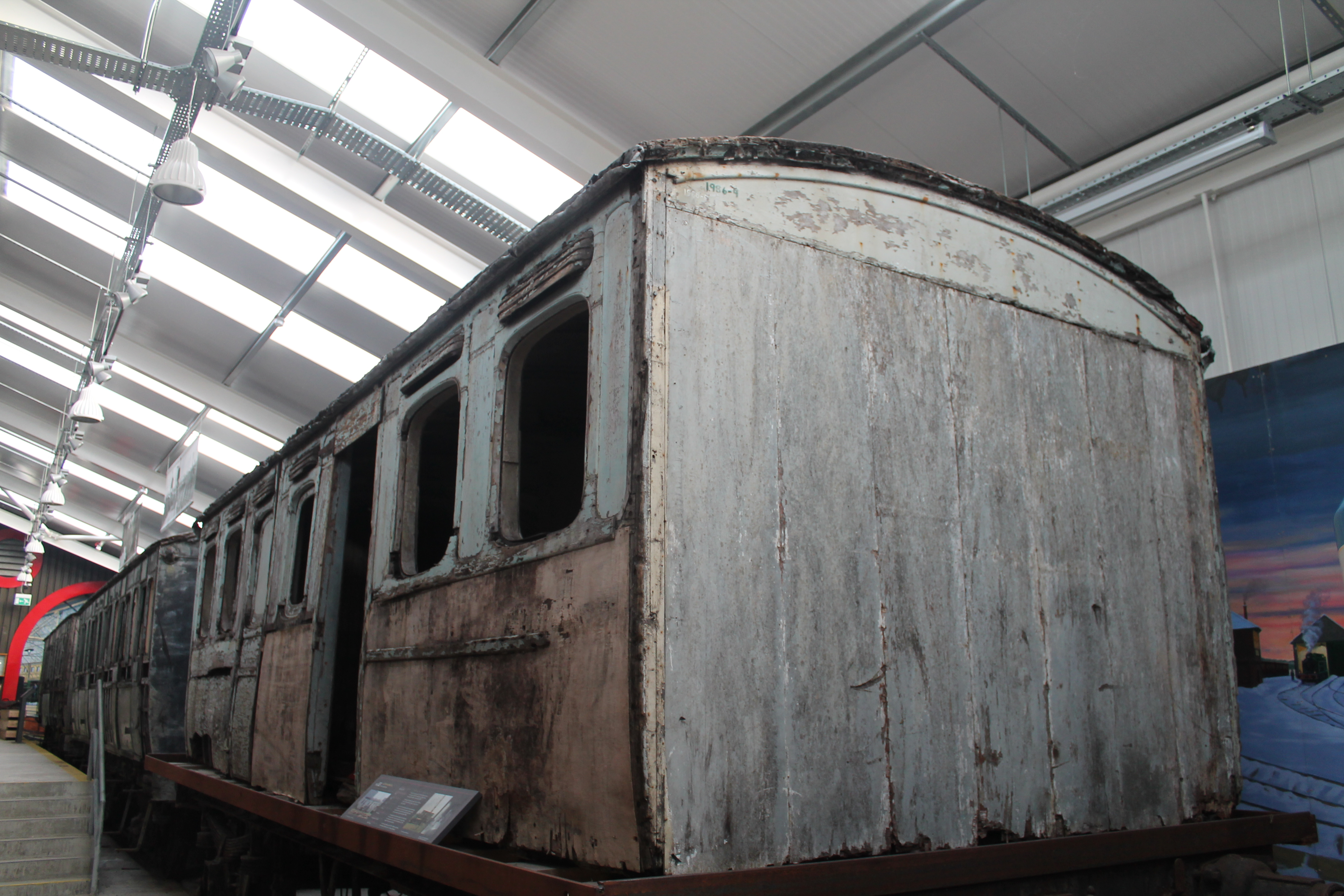
Surviving body of 1862 coach Nº33

One example of Ulster Railway rolling stock has survived. The body of No. 33, built as a family saloon in 1862 and withdrawn in the 1920s having passed into GNR hands, is preserved at the Downpatrick and County Down Railway. It has been moved to the carriage workshop where restoration is now underway. The body has been stripped down framing repaired and reassembly is underway. Many original features remain with many of the original panels being refurbished and re-installed. Some of the unique features of the original body highlight that this coach was mid way between the stagecoach bodies of the 1850s and the classical Victorian coach body of the 1870s onwards. These features include rounded tops and bottoms of the windows, door handles placed below the normal waist line in stagecoach manner for access from lower platforms and internal water piping within the frames in a mixture of hessian hose and lead fittings.

The coach is a family saloon with two large compartments and a small toilet compartment accessible to each compartment. Both toilet compartments are in the centre of the coach. The internal piping rises to roof level where a water tank will have been fitted. The internal branch indicates that a small wash basin must have been fitted. It was lit by four pot lamps with two in each of the main saloons. The original roof holes and interior bezels remain. The lower level of roof canvas remains with the original lamp holes remaining. The underframe has not been preserved. It was fitted with electric lighting in late 1890s and it may have had a new GNR under frame fitted at this time. It likely had an unbraked, six wheel wooden framework. The short body length of 23 feet (7.01 m) would have meant a relatively short wheelbase. A similar sized 6-wheeled Ulster Railway coach was part of the train involved in the Armagh accident (1889), but by this time the Smiths simple vacuum brake had been fitted and the under frame may have been renewed, so exact details are unknown. A 4-wheeled, vacuum-braked underframe replica will be built using vintage components, but replacing wood with modern steel channel assembled such it will look like wood when painted.

== Sources and further reading ==
- FitzGerald, J.D. (1995). The Derry Road. Colourpoint Transport. Gortrush: Colourpoint Press. p. 1. ISBN 1-898392-09-9.
- Hajducki, S. Maxwell (1974). A Railway Atlas of Ireland. Newton Abbott: David & Charles. ISBN 0-7153-5167-2.
- McCutcheon, Alan (1969). Ireland. Railway History in Pictures. Vol. 1. Newton Abbott: David & Charles. ISBN 0-7153-4651-2.
- Patterson, E.M. (1986) [1962]. Great Northern Railway of Ireland. Oakwood Library of Railway History. Lingfield: Oakwood Press. ISBN 0-85361-343-5.
- Whishaw, Francis (1842). The Railways of Great Britain and Ireland Practically Described and Illustrated (2nd ed.). London: John Weale. pp. 430–437. OCLC 833076248.
