= List of closed railway stations in Ireland =

This is a list of closed railway stations in Ireland. Year of passenger closure is given if known. Stations reopened as heritage railways or Luas stops continue to be included in this list and some have been linked. Some stations have been reopened to passenger traffic. Some lines are still in use for freight and mineral traffic.

== Table of stations ==
Station (Town, unless in station name)	County	Rail company	Year opened	Year closed	Coordinates
Abbeydorney	Kerry	Great Southern and Western	1880	1963	52.349°N 9.6883°W
Abbeyfeale	Limerick	Great Southern and Western	1880	1963 (passengers); 1978 (goods)	52.3940°N 9.3012°W
Abbeyleix	Laois	Great Southern and Western	1865	1963	52.9085°N 7.3561°W
Abohill	Fermanagh	Sligo, Leitrim and Northern Counties	1886	1957	54.2913°N 7.7830°W
Achill	Mayo	Midland Great Western	1895	1937	53.9341°N 9.9183°W
Acton Crossing	Armagh	Great Northern (Ireland)	1934	1954	54.3097°N 6.368°W
Adams Crossing	Armagh	Great Northern (Ireland)	1934	1936	54.3979°N 6.412°W
Adare	Limerick	Great Southern and Western	1856	1963	52.5682°N 8.798°W
Adavoyle	Armagh	Great Northern (Ireland)	1892	1933	54.1082°N 6.3867°W
Adoon	Leitrim	Cavan and Leitrim	1887	1959	53.9779°N 7.8454°W
Aghadowey	Londonderry	NCC (Midland)	1880	1950	55.0343°N 6.6234°W
Aghavea	Fermanagh	Clogher Valley	1887	1942	54.3034°N 7.4282°W
Aldergrove	Antrim	Great Northern (Ireland)	1871	1960	54.6455°N 6.2413°W
Andraid	Antrim	Belfast and Ballymena Railway	1848	1850	54.8103°N 6.2987°W
Annacotty	Limerick	Great Southern and Western	1858	1963	52.6637°N 8.5108°W
Annadale	Leitrim	Cavan and Leitrim	1888	1959	54.0367°N 7.945°W
Annadrumman Crossing	Monaghan	Great Northern (Ireland)	1934	1954	54.0924°N 6.6999°W
Annagh No 2 Crossing	Clare	West Clare Railway	1952	1961	52.8276°N 9.4253°W
Annagher Crossing	Tyrone	Great Northern (Ireland), Cookstown branch	1938	1942	54.5444°N 6.7006°W
Annaghilla	Tyrone	Clogher Valley	1887	1942	54.4492°N 7.0737°W
Annaghmore	Armagh	Great Northern (Ireland)	1858	1965	54.4609°N 6.5848°W
Annakeera Crossing	Armagh	Great Northern (Ireland)	1937	1957	54.4364°N 6.4846°W
Annaloughan Halt	Louth	Great Northern (Ireland)	1935	1952	54.0034°N 6.2754°W
Antrim (Great Northern Railway)	Antrim	Great Northern (Ireland)	1871	1960	54.718°N 6.212°W
Ardagh	Limerick	Waterford and Western	1867	1963	52.4936°N 9.055°W
Ardara Road Halt	Donegal	County Donegal	1893	1960	54.6604°N 8.4111°W
Ardbraccan Crossing	Meath	Great Northern (Ireland), Oldcastle branch	1937	1942	53.6711°N 6.7463°W
Ardee	Louth	Great Northern (Ireland)	1896	1934 (passengers); 1975 (goods)	53.8565°N 6.5364°W
Ardfert	Kerry	Great Southern and Western	1880	1963	52.3199°N 9.7509°W
Ardgillan (Private halt for Ardgillan Castle)	Dublin	Dublin and Drogheda Railway	1844	1867	53.5871°N 6.1518°W
Ardglass	Down	Downpatrick, Killough and Ardglass Railway	1892	1950	54.2632°N 5.6118°W
Ardmayle	Tipperary	Great Southern and Western	1907	1947	52.5641°N 7.9322°W
Ardmore	Londonderry	NCC (Midland)	1883	1933	55.0278°N 6.9014°W
Ardsollus and Quin	Clare	Great Southern and Western	1859	1963	52.8049°N 8.8874°W
Arigna	Roscommon	Cavan and Leitrim	1888	1959	54.0653°N 8.0873°W
Armagh (Great Northern)	Armagh	Great Northern (Ireland)	1848	1957	54.3566°N 6.6576°W
Armagh, Drummondmore Bridge	Armagh	Newry and Armagh Railway	1864	1865	54.3608°N 6.6268°W
Armagh Irish Street Halt	Armagh	Great Northern (Ireland)	1913	1933	54.3437°N 6.6611°W
Armoy	Antrim	Ballycastle Railway	1880	1950	55.1335°N 6.3346°W
Arva Road	Cavan	Midland Great Western	1886	1947	53.9604°N 7.4773°W
Ashfield Halt	Down	Great Northern (Ireland), Lisburn to Banbridge branch	1863	1956	54.3943°N 6.1781°W
Askeaton	Limerick	Great Southern and Western, Foynes branch	1857	1963	52.5912°N 8.9802°W
Athboy	Meath	Midland Great Western	1864	1947	53.6222°N 6.9136°W
Athlone (MGWR)	Roscommon	Midland Great Western	1859	1985	53.4269°N 7.9484°W
Attanagh	Laois	Great Southern and Western	1865	1963	52.833°N 7.352°W
Aughacasla	Kerry	Tralee and Dingle	1891	1939	52.2374°N 9.9888°W
Aughalurcher Crossing	Fermanagh	Great Northern (Ireland)	1935	1950	54.2315°N 7.4397°W
Aughaville (Aghaville)	Cork	Cork Bandon & South Coast	1886	1961	51.6547°N 9.3533°W
Augher	Tyrone	Clogher Valley	1887	1942	54.4284°N 7.1323°W
Augheranter Crossing	Armagh	Great Northern (Ireland)	1934	1954	54.2833°N 6.3627°W
Aughnacloy	Tyrone	Clogher Valley	1887	1942	54.4163°N 6.9724°W
Aughrim	Wicklow	Dublin, Wicklow and Wexford Railway, Shillelagh branch line	1865	1944	52.8539°N 6.3275°W
Aunascaul	Kerry	Tralee and Dingle	1891	1939	52.1527°N 10.0587°W
Avoca	Wicklow	Dublin and South Eastern	1863	1964	52.8578°N 6.2148°W
Baldoyle	Dublin	Dublin and Drogheda	1844	1846	53.3976°N 6.1505°W
Baldongan	Dublin	Dublin and Drogheda	1845	1847	53.5479°N 6.116°W
Baldoyle	Dublin	Dublin and Drogheda	1844	1848	53.3976°N 6.1505°W
Balla	Mayo	Midland Great Western	1862	1963	53.7952°N 9.1308°W
Ballagh	Tyrone	Clogher Valley		1942	54.3951°N 7.2303°W
Ballaghaderreen	Roscommon	Midland Great Western, Ballaghaderreen branch line	1874	1963	53.8997°N 8.5799°W
Ballast Pit	Donegal	County Donegal Railways Joint Committee	1944	1947	54.853°N 8.1716°W
Ballinacourty	Waterford	CIÉ	1970	1982	52.0819°N 7.5534°W
Ballinahoun (Ballinahown)	Westmeath	GS&WR, Athlone branch	1862	1862	53.3594°N 7.7990°W
Ballinamallard	Fermanagh	Londonderry and Enniskillen Railway	1854	1957	54.4188°N 7.5956°W
Ballinamore (Leitrim)	Leitrim	Cavan and Leitrim	1887	1959	54.0547°N 7.7964°W
Ballinamore (Donegal)	Donegal	County Donegal	1895	1947	54.8658°N 8.0567°W
Ballinascarthy Junction	Cork	Cork Bandon & South Coast	1886	1961	51.6736°N 8.8583°W
Ballinasloe Fair Platform	Meath	Midland Great Western Railway	1875	1875	
Ballinasteenig	Kerry	Tralee and Dingle Light Railway	1895	1939	52.1405°N 10.1968°W
Ballincollig	Cork	Cork & Macroom	1866	1935	51.8827°N 8.5893°W
Ballindangan	Cork	GS&W	1906	1947	52.2342°N 8.3315°W
Ballinderry	Antrim	Dublin and Antrim Junction Railway	1871	2003	54.5415°N 6.2034°W
Ballindine	Mayo	Waterford, Limerick and Western Railway	1894	1963	53.6685°N 8.959°W
Ballindoon Bridge	Donegal	County Donegal Railways Joint Committee	1944	1947	54.8014°N 7.8027°W
Ballindrait	Donegal	Strabane and Letterkenny Railway	1909	1960	54.8470°N 7.5194°W
Ballineen	Cork	Cork Bandon & South Coast	1866	1891	51.7349°N 8.9528°W
Ballineen & Enniskean	Cork	Cork Bandon & South Coast	1891	1961	51.7357°N 8.9414°W
Ballinglen	Wicklow	Dublin and South Eastern Railway	1876	1944	52.814445°N 6.406440°W
Ballingrane	Limerick	Great Southern and Western Railway	1856	1963 (passengers); 1973 (goods); 1978 (final closure)	52.548090°N 8.935627°W
Ballinhassig	Cork	Cork Bandon & South Coast	1849	1961	51.8095°N 8.5606°W
Ballinlough	Roscommon	MGW	1880	1963	53.753576°N 8.628237°W
Ballinosare	Kerry	Tralee and Dingle Light Railway	1897	1939	52.14437°N 10.109502°W
Ballinrobe	Mayo	MGW, Ballinrobe branch	1892	1930 (passengers); 1960 (goods)	53.617788°N 9.216553°W
Ballintogher	Sligo	Sligo, Leitrim and Northern Counties Railway	1881	1957	54.196324°N 8.360312°W
Ballintra	Donegal	Donegal Railway Company, Ballyshannon branch	1905	1960	54.5812°N 8.1426°W
Ballsbridge Showground	Dublin	D&SE	1893	1943	53.328553°N 6.22841°W
Ballyards	Armagh	Castleblayney, Keady and Armagh Railway	1909	1933	54.30733°N 6.6829°W
Ballybay	Monaghan	Dundalk and Enniskillen Railway	1854	1957	54.1299°N 6.8999°W
Ballybeg	Meath	Dublin and Drogheda Railway; GNR(I), Oldcastle branch	1855	1958	53.69089°N 6.815478°W
Ballybofey	Donegal	Donegal Railway Company	1895	1947	54.7998°N 7.7863°W
Ballyboley	Antrim	Ballymena and Larne Railway	1878	1930 (passengers); 1940 (goods)	54.794624°N 5.940771°W
Ballybrack (Kerry)	Kerry	GS&W	1892	1963	52.131468°N 9.582080°W
Ballybrack	Dublin	Dublin and Wicklow Railway (D&WR)	1858	1863	53.251601°N 6.113474°W approx.
Ballybrack	Dublin	Dublin, Wicklow & Wexford Rly	1863	1882	53.25018°N 6.113805°W
Ballybunion	Kerry	Listowel and Ballybunion Railway	1888	1924	52.511144°N 9.672822°W
Ballycar & Newmarket	Clare	Waterford and Limerick Railway	1859	1963	52.765539°N 8.858170°W
Ballycastle	Armagh	Ballycastle Railway	1880	1950	55.201°N 6.2482°W
Ballyclare (BL)	Antrim	Ballymena and Larne Railway	1878	1930 (passengers); 1940 (goods); 1950 (final closure)	54.751454°N 5.99751°W
Ballyclare (NCC)	Antrim	Belfast and Ballymena Railway	1884	1938 (passengers); 1950 (final closure)	54.749396°N 5.996881°W
Ballyclare Junction	Antrim	Belfast and Ballymena Railway	1849	1961	54.699428°N 5.968323°W
Ballycloughan	Armagh	Ballymena, Cushendall and Red Bay Railway	1886	1930	54.907952°N 6.240559°W
Ballyconnell	Cavan	Cavan and Leitrim Railway	1887	1959	54.109446°N 7.581532°W
Ballycullane	Wexford	Waterford, Limerick and Western	1906	2010	52.2834°N 6.83958°W
Ballycumber	Offaly	GS&W, Athlone branch	1862	1963	53.334458°N 7.697321°W
Ballydehob	Cork	Schull & Skibbereen	1886	1947	51.5617°N 9.4547°W
Ballyduff	Cork	Great Southern and Western	1872	1967	52.1425°N 8.0742°W
Ballyglunin	Galway	Great Southern and Western	1860	1976	53.4311°N 8.7937°W
Ballyhaise	Cavan	Great Northern (Ireland)	1862	1957	
Ballysadare	Sligo	Midland Great Western	1862	1963	54.214083°N 8.502739°W
Banagher	Offaly	Great Southern and Western, Banagher Branch	1884	1947 (passengers); 1963 (goods)	53.1923°N 7.9904°W
Bawnboy Road and Templeport	Cavan	Cavan and Leitrim	1887	1959	54.0956°N 7.6637°W
Belmont & Cloghan	Offaly	Great Southern and Western, Banagher Branch	1884	1947 (passengers); 1963 (goods)	53.2480°N 7.8870°W
Birr	Offaly	Great Southern and Western, Roscrea & Parsonstown (Birr) branch	1858	1963	53.0853°N 7.9070°W
Bray Cove Halt	Wicklow	Dublin and South Eastern	1906	1929	53.195614°N 6.089522°W
Bridgetown halt	Wexford	Waterford, Limerick and Western	1906	2010	52.2312°N 6.54918°W
Burtonport	Donegal	Londonderry and Lough Swilly	1903	1940	54.98135°N 8.43957°W
Cahirciveen	Kerry	Great Southern and Western	1893	1960	51.94836°N 10.2277°W
Caledon	Tyrone	Clogher Valley	1887	1942	54.350775°N 6.836854°W
Camolin	Wexford	DW&WR	1867	1964	52.611395°N 6.431223°W
Camp Halt	Kerry	Tralee and Dingle Railway	1914	1939	52.220839°N 9.909092°W
Campile	Wexford	Waterford, Limerick and Western	1906	2010	52.2855°N 6.93896°W
Capecastle	Antrim	Ballycastle Railway	1882	1950	55.165156°N 6.295807°W
Cappagh	Waterford	Great Southern and Western	1878	1967	52.1212°N 7.7560°W
Cappa (Cappagh) Pier	Clare	South Clare Railway	1892	1916 (passengers); 1961 (final closure)	52.6288°N 9.4996°W
Cappoquin	Waterford	Fishguard and Rosslare Railway	1878	1967	52.1451°N 7.8481°W
Caragh Lake	Kerry	Great Southern and Western Railway	1893	1960	52.0777°N 9.8565°W
Carbury	Kildare	Midland Great Western, Edenderry branch	1877	1931	53.364°N 6.9706°W
Carndonagh Halt	Donegal	L&LS	1929	1935	55.2685°N 7.2867°W
Carndonagh	Donegal	L&LS	1907	1935	55.25335°N 7.2616°W
Cargan	Antrim	Ballymena, Cushendall and Red Bay Railway	1889	1930	54.996155°N 6.180367°W
Carrickmines	Dublin	Dublin and Wicklow	1854	1959	53.254316°N 6.171865°W
Crumlin	Antrim	Dublin and Antrim Junction Railway	1871	2003	54.62092°N 6.211895°W
Cashel	Tipperary	Great Southern and Western	1905	1947	52.5209°N 7.8979°W
Cork Albert Quay	Cork	Cork, Bandon and South Coast	1851	1961	51.8982°N 8.4621°W
Crawfordsburn	Down	Northern Ireland Railways	1965	1997	54.6637°N 5.7216°W
City Park (Cork)	Cork	Cork, Blackrock and Passage	1885	1889	
Crossdoney	Cavan	MGW, Cavan branch	1856	1947 (passengers); 1960 (goods)	53.9453°N 7.4272°W
Dalkey (Atmospheric)	Dublin	Dublin & Kingstown	1843	1854	53.278002°N 6.112027°W
Dromore	Down	Banbridge, Lisburn & Belfast Railway	1863	1956	54.414682°N 6.157815°W
Drumhawnagh (Drumhowna)	Cavan	Midland Great Western Railway	1877	1947	53.872536°N 7.452363°W
Dublin Broadstone	Dublin	Midland Great Western	1847	1937	53.354291°N 6.273816°W
Duncormick	Wexford	Waterford, Limerick and Western	1906	1976	52.242267°N 6.667782°W
Dundrum	Dublin	Dublin and Wicklow	1854	1959	53.292424°N 6.245123°W
Dungloe	Donegal	Londonderry and Lough Swilly	1903	1940	54.976688°N 8.405°W
Dún Laoghaire, Carlisle Pier	Dublin	Dublin and Wicklow	1859	1980	53.295°N 6.130°W
Dunsandle	Galway	Midland Great Western Railway	1890	1975	53.26615°N 8.60452°W
Edenderry	Offaly	Midland Great Western, Enfield-Edenderry branch	1877	1931 (passengers); 1963 (goods)	53.3435°N 7.0451°W
Enniskillen	Fermanagh	Londonderry and Enniskillen Railway	1854	1957	54.345022°N 7.627562°W
Factory Crossing	Meath	Great Northern (Ireland), Oldcastle Branch, MP16.25	1937	1958	53.653°N 6.6714°W
Fahan	Donegal	Londonderry and Lough Swilly	1864	1948	55.088442°N 7.476091°W
Fairyhouse Bridge	Meath	Midland Great Western	1872	1931	53.449672°N 6.477463°W
Falcarragh	Donegal	Londonderry and Lough Swilly	1903	1940	55.1184°N 8.0691°W
Ferbane	Offaly	Great Southern and Western, Banagher Branch	1884	1947 (passengers); 1963 (goods)	53.2675°N 7.8286°W
Float	Westmeath	Midland Great Western	1856	1947	53.7095°N 7.4474°W
Foxrock	Dublin	Dublin and Wicklow	1861	1959	53.267125°N 6.185232°W
Galbally Crossing	Tyrone	Great Northern (Ireland)	1935	1950	54.485185°N 7.483203°W
Gallagh Road	Londonderry	Londonderry and Lough Swilly	1881	1924	55.02874°N 7.34588°W
Gallinagh's Gates	Donegal	County Donegal	1944	1947	54.799408°N 7.795159°W
Gaol Cross	Cork	Cork and Muskerry	1888	1898 (passengers); 1934 (final line closure)	51.894553°N 8.495162°W
Garadice	Leitrim	Cavan and Leitrim	1887	1959	54.072050°N 7.729376°W
Garrynadur	Kerry	Tralee and Dingle	1895	1939	52.146960°N 10.136430°W
Garvagh	Londonderry	Derry Central Railway	1880	1950	54.9883°N 6.6768°W
Garvaghy No 1 Crossing	Tyrone	Great Northern (Ireland)	1937	1941	54.582682°N 7.247562°W
Garvaghy No 2 Crossing	Tyrone	Great Northern (Ireland)	1938	1959	54.586651°N 7.255952°W
Glaslough	Monaghan	Ulster Railway	1858	1957	54.316491°N 6.900671°W
Glasnevin	Dublin	Great Southern and Western	1901	1910	53.364708°N 6.270983°W
Glenavy	Antrim	Dublin and Antrim Junction Railway	1871	2005	54.588845°N 6.214802°W
Glenmore and Aylwardstown	Kilkenny	DW&WR, Waterford to Palace East branch	1904	1964	52.336539°N 7.008065°W
Goraghwood	Armagh	Dublin and Belfast Junction Railway	1854	1965	54.224162°N 6.36491°W
Great Victoria Street	Antrim	Ulster Railway	Opened:1839 Reopened:1995	Original Closure:1976 Final Closure:2024	54.5942°N 5.9362°E
Harcourt Street	Dublin	Dublin and Wicklow	1859	1959	53.3334550°N 6.2624722°W
Hillsborough	Down	Great Northern	1863	1956	54.462°N 6.083°W
Inch	Wexford	Dublin and Wicklow	1885	1964	52.745738°N 6.222453°W
Inchicore Works Halt	Dublin	GS&W	1875	2001	53.3409°N 6.3286°W
Inch Road	Donegal	Londonderry and Lough Swilly Railway	1864	1948	55.06315°N 7.4518°W
Innishannon Road	Cork	Cork, Bandon and South Coast	1849	1891	51.768614°N 8.689809°W
Inniskean	Monaghan	Dundalk and Enniskillen Railway	1851	1957	54.004264°N 6.575387°W
Inny Junction	Westmeath	MGW	1869	1941	53.660221°N 7.448053°W
Inver	Donegal	West Donegal Railway	1893	1960	54.657241°N 8.27721°W
Irvinestown	Fermanagh	Enniskillen and Bundoran Railway	1866	1957	54.469880°N 7.629752°W
Irvinestown (Bundoran Junct. from 1866)	Tyrone	Londonderry and Enniskillen Railway	1854	1957	54.445790°N 7.55597°W
Islandeady	Mayo	MGW, Mayo branch	1914	1963	53.811495°N 9.380908°W
Island Road	Sligo	MGW, Ballaghaderreen branch line	1909	1963	53.938500°N 8.489056°W
Jerpoint Hill	Kilkenny	GS&W	1850	1853	52.510140°N 7.155105°W
Johnston's Crossing	Fermanagh	Great Northern (Ireland), Bundoran branch	1934	1950	
Junction Crossing, Dungannon	Tyrone	Great Northern (Ireland)	1938	1958	54.507157°N 6.782531°W
Kanturk	Cork	Great Southern & Western	1889	1947 (passengers); 1963 (goods)	52.1757°N 8.9105°W
Katesbridge	Down	Great Northern (Ireland)	1880	1955	54.298666°N 6.147596°W
Keady	Armagh	Great Northern (Ireland)	1909	1932	54.251684°N 6.69969°W
Kells (GNRI)	Meath	GNRI, Oldcastle branch	1853	1958	53.721976°N 6.881165°W
Kells (GSWR)	Kerry	GS&W, West Kerry branch	1893	1960	51.997995°N 10.113037°W
Kells (Antrim)	Antrim	Ballymena and Larne Railway	1878	1933	54.812655°N 6.217721°W
Kellswater	Antrim	Northern Counties Committee	1876	1971	54.8068°N 6.2993°W
Kellybridge Halt	Louth	Great Northern (Ireland)	1925	1957	53.995708°N 6.504092°W
Killashandra	Cavan	Midland Great Western	1886	1947	54.0133°N 7.5311°W
Killinick	Wexford	Fishguard and Rosslare Railways and Harbours	1906	1976 (regular service); 1979 (final closure)	52.261744°N 6.458049°W
Kilmallock	Limerick	Great Southern and Western Railway	1849	1976	52.394537°N 8.564262°W
Kincasslagh Road	Donegal	Londonderry and Lough Swilly	1913	1940	54.98955°N 8.383106°W
Kingscourt	Cavan	Midland Great Western	1875	1947	53.886053°N 6.799089°W
Kingstown Harbour	Dublin	Dublin and Kingstown	1835	1837	
Knock	Down	Belfast and County Down Railway	1850	1950	54.590578°N 5.855541°W
Knockmore Halt	Antrim	Northern Ireland Railways	1974	2005	54°30′41″N 6°04′05″W
Lamberton's Halt	Donegal	Londonderry and Lough Swilly	1928	1948	55.071561°N 7.454805°W
Liffey Junction	Dublin	Midland Great Western	1864	1937	53.354291°N 6.273816°W
Letterkenny (CDR)	Donegal	County Donegal Railway	1909	1960	54.953697°N 7.728593°W
Letterkenny (LLS)	Donegal	Londonderry and Lough Swilly	1883	1940 (passengers); 1953 (goods)	54.953545°N 7.728424°W
Lisfannon Links Halt	Donegal	Londonderry and Lough Swilly	1892	1948	55.112233°N 7.465146°W
Lisnagry	Limerick	GSW, Limerick & Ballybrophy branch	1858	1963	52.689335°N 8.503189°W
Londonderry Cow Market	Londonderry	Londonderry and Enniskillen Railway	1847	1850	54.9875°N 7.3330°W
Londonderry Graving Dock	Londonderry	Londonderry and Lough Swilly	1863	1948 (passengers); 1953 (goods)	55.0088°N 7.3186°W
Londonderry Middle Quay	Londonderry	Londonderry Port and Harbour Commissioners	1869	1888	55.004000°N 7.321164°W
Londonderry Victoria Road	Londonderry	Donegal Railway Company	1900	1955	54.9893°N 7.3167°W
Loreto College Halt	Cavan	Great Northern Railway	1930	1957	54.012929°N 7.376612°W
Loughrea	Galway	Midland Great Western Railway	1890	1975	53.201°N 8.567°W
Merrion	Dublin	Dublin and Kingstown	1835	1934	53.31574°N 6.20425°W
Milltown	Dublin	Dublin and Wicklow	1860	1959	53.309654°N 6.251807°W
Moate	Westmeath	Midland Great Western	1851	1987	53.39926°N 7.724472°W
Mosney	Meath	Great Northern Railway	1948	2000	53.664°N 6.233°W
Mountmellick	Laois	Waterford & Central Ireland Railway	1885	1947 (passengers); 1963 (final closure)	53.119453°N 7.338666°W
Mountpleasant	Louth	Great Northern Railway	1850	1965	54.0473°N 6.3775°W
Naas (GS&W)	Kildare	GS&W, Tullow branch	1885	1947	53.220673°N 6.657916°W
Narrow Water	Down	Great Northern (Ireland)	1849	1965	54.112076°N 6.281635°W
Navan	Meath	Great Northern (Ireland)	1850	1958	53.648816°N 6.684671°W
Navan Junction	Meath	Midland Great Western; Great Northern (Ireland)	1850	1947	53.647980°N 6.691994°W
Neill's Hill	Down	Belfast and County Down	1890	1950	54.590607°N 5.865441°W
Newcastle (County Wicklow)	Wicklow	DW&WR	1856	1964	53.069190°N 6.035278°W
Obelisk Hill	Dublin	Dublin and Wicklow Railway (D&WR)	1854	1858	53.269938°N 6.097266°W
Oldcastle	Meath	Great Northern (Ireland)	1863	1958 (passengers); 1963 (goods)	53.771229°N 7.161636°W
Oldtown	Donegal	Londonderry and Lough Swilly	1903	1947	54.945644°N 7.740319°W
Queens Quay, Belfast	Down	Belfast, Hollywood & Bangor Railway	1848	1976	54.6016°N 5.9174°W
Quilty	Clare	West Clare	1892	1961	52.815758°N 9.4566°W
Quinn's Crossing	Donegal	County Donegal	1944	1959	54.778779°N 7.824236°W
Raffeen	Cork	Cork, Blackrock and Passage	1903	1932	51.837572°N 8.361021°W
Ranelagh	Dublin	Dublin, Wicklow and Wexford	1896	1959	53.320924°N 6.254658°W
St. Ann's	Cork	Cork and Muskerry	1887	1934	51.927686°N 8.598268°W
Saintfield	Down	Belfast and County Down	1858	1950	54.461253°N 5.825555°W
Shankill	Dublin	Dublin and Wicklow	1854	1959	53.234°N 6.127°W
St Johnston	Donegal	Great Northern (Ireland)	1847	1965	54.933747°N 7.456681°W
Stillorgan	Dublin	Dublin and Wicklow	1854	1959	53.275969°N 6.199373°W
Strabane (CDR)	Tyrone	County Donegal Railway	1894	1960	54.830478°N 7.470319°W
Strabane (GNR(I))	Tyrone	Great Northern (Ireland)	1847	1965	54.830478°N 7.470319°W
Straffan	Kildare	Great Southern & Western	1848	1947	53.296143°N 6.584654°W
Tallow Road	Waterford	Fishguard and Rosslare Railways and Harbours	1872	1967	52.127018°N 7.995706°W
Tamlaght Halt	Londonderry	NCC (Midland)	1917	1950	54.913643°N 6.592980°W
Tanderagee	Armagh	Dublin and Belfast Junction Railway	1852	1965	54.363939°N 6.384293°W
Tassagh	Armagh	Castleblayney, Keady and Armagh Railway	1911	1932	
Tattykeeran Crossing	Tyrone	Great Northern (Ireland), Portadown & Londonderry branch	1938	1959	54.566319°N 7.193331°W
Tattynuckle	Fermanagh	Clogher Valley	1890	1897	54.359183°N 7.341252°W
Teague's Crossing	Tyrone	Great Northern (Ireland), Bundoran branch	1935	1959	
Templepatrick	Antrim	Belfast and Ballymena Railway	1848	1981	54.701753°N 6.091848°W
Tuam	Galway	Great Southern & Western	1860	1976 (passengers); 1993 (final closure)	53.511576°N 8.853333°W
Upperlands	Londonderry	Derry Central Railway	1880	1950	54.8774°N 6.6427°W
Uprichard's Crossing	Armagh	Great Northern (Ireland), Scarva, Banbridge & Ballyroney branch	1934	1955	54.370360°N 6.322528°W
Upton & Innishannon	Cork	Cork, Bandon and South Coast	1849	1961	51.788053°N 8.672085°W
Valencia Harbour	Kerry	Great Southern and Western	1893	1960	51.929897°N 10.277085°W
Vernersbridge	Antrim	Great Northern (Ireland)	1858	1954	54.472652°N 6.641859°W
Victoria (Cork)	Cork	Cork and Muskerry	1887	1934	51.892872°N 8.505364°W
Victoria Bridge (CVB)	Tyrone	Castlederg and Victoria Bridge	1884	1933	54.7628°N 7.4558°W
Victoria Bridge (GNI)	Tyrone	Great Northern (Ireland)	1852	1965	54.763785°N 7.456911°W
Victoria Park Halt	Antrim	Belfast and County Down	1905	1988	54.605191°N 5.886336°W
Virginia Road	Meath	Great Northern (Ireland)	1863	1958	53.7637°N 7.0147°W
Wellingtonbridge	Wexford	Waterford, Limerick and Western	1906	2010	52.2678°N 6.75392°W
Woodbrook Halt	Dublin	Dublin and South Eastern	1910	1960	53.22°N 6.1101°W
Youghal	Cork	Great Southern and Western	1860	1963	51.939619°N 7.847217°W
