= Ballywillan railway station =

Railway station in Ireland

Ballywillan

General information
- Location: Ballywillan, County Longford; Ireland
- Platforms: 2

History
- Pre-grouping: Midland Great Western Railway

Key dates
- 8 July 1856: Station opened
- 1947: Station closed to passengers
- 1959: last passenger special
- 1960: line closed to all traffic

Services
Preceding station	Midland Great Western Railway	Following station
Float	Inny Junction-Cavan	Drumhawnagh
Location

Ballywillan Railway Station in County Longford was a former station on the Inny Junction to Cavan branch of the Midland Great Western Railway, Ireland. It opened in 1856 and closed in 1947. It is now a private residence.
