= George Wilkinson (architect) =

Architect in Ireland

- Born: 1814; Witney
- Died: 1890; Twickenham
- Occupation: Architect
- Buildings: Harcourt Street Railway Station in Dublin

Harcourt St station, 1910

George Wilkinson, FRIBA was an English architect, who practised largely in Ireland. He was born at Witney, Oxfordshire in 1814. He was the elder brother of the architect William Wilkinson (1819–1901), who practised in Oxford.

== Career ==
George Wilkinson won a competition in 1835 to design a workhouse for the Thame Poor Law Union. The building was until 2004 a campus of Oxford and Cherwell Valley College. Wilkinson went on to design a total of two dozen workhouses in England, including those at Northleach (1835) Stow-on-the-Wold (1836) and Woodstock (1836–1837), each with wings laid out in an H-plan. Wilkinson built Tenbury workhouse (1837) on a double courtyard plan. For two workhouses, Witney (1835–1836) and Chipping Norton (1836), he used an unusual design of a saltire of four wings radiating from an octagonal central block. For Wolverhampton he adapted this layout to six wings. In 1839 George Wilkinson was invited to Ireland as the architect of the Poor Law Commission.

Wilkinson published a Practical Geology and Ancient Architecture of Ireland (1845). He also designed the railway station in Multyfarnham, County Westmeath, an Italianate station at Crossdoney in County Cavan (c. 1855), the Cavan town terminus (1862) for the Midland Great Western Railway, and Harcourt Street Railway Station, Dublin, (1858–1859) for the Dublin Wicklow and Wexford Railway.

Wilkinson married Mary Clinch in Witney on 18 December 1850. Mary was a daughter of John Williams Clinch (1788–1871) the Witney brewer, banker and landowner. He was made a Fellow of the Royal Institute of British Architects in 1878.

Wilkinson retired to England in about 1888, and died at Ryde House, Twickenham on 4 October 1890.

== Sources ==
- Brodie, Antonia; Felstead, Alison; Franklin, Jonathan; Pinfield, Leslie; Oldfield, Jane, eds. (2001). Directory of British Architects 1834–1914, L-Z. London & New York: Continuum. p. 991. ISBN 0-8264-5514-X.
- Colvin, H.M. (1997). A Biographical Dictionary of British Architects, 1600–1840. New Haven: Yale University Press. pp. not cited. ISBN 0-300-07207-4. s.v. "George Wilkinson"
- Sherwood, Jennifer; Pevsner, Nikolaus (1974). The Buildings of England: Oxfordshire. Harmondsworth: Penguin Books. ISBN 0-14-071045-0.
- Verey, David (1970). The Buildings of England: Gloucestershire: The Cotswolds. Harmondsworth: Penguin Books. p. 343. ISBN 0-14-071040-X.
