= Belturbet railway station =

Railway station in County Cavan, Ireland

Belturbet
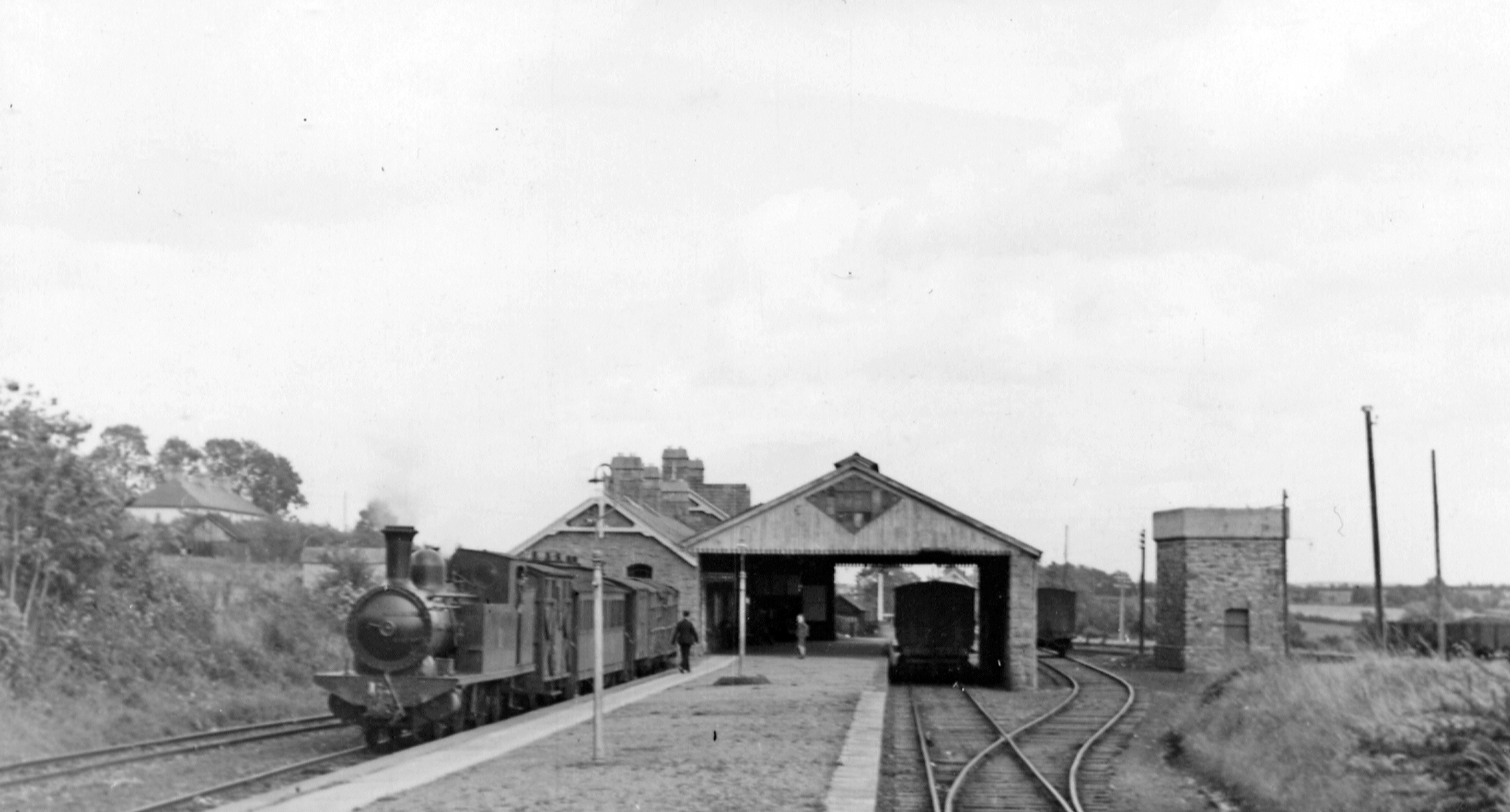

General information
- Location: Belturbet, County Cavan; Ireland
- Platforms: 2

History
- Pre-grouping: Great Northern Railway

Key dates
- 1885: station opened for Great Northern Railway (Ireland) passengers
- 1887: station opened for Cavan and Leitrim Railway passengers
- 1957: station closed for Great Northern Railway (Ireland) passengers
- 1959: station closed for Cavan and Leitrim Railway passengers
Location

Belturbet was the former terminus station of both the 4¼ mile Ballyhaise to Belturbet branch of the Great Northern Railway (Ireland) line and of the Cavan and Leitrim Railway. For many years the station was somewhat derelict but it is now fully restored and houses a museum. The platform remains extant too and a small length of track has been reinstated together with some rolling stock.

| Preceding station | Disused railways | Following station |
|---|---|---|
| Ballyhaise | GNR; Belturbet branch | Terminus |
| Ballyhaise | Cavan and Leitrim Railway; Belturbet branch | Tomkin Road |

== Gallery ==
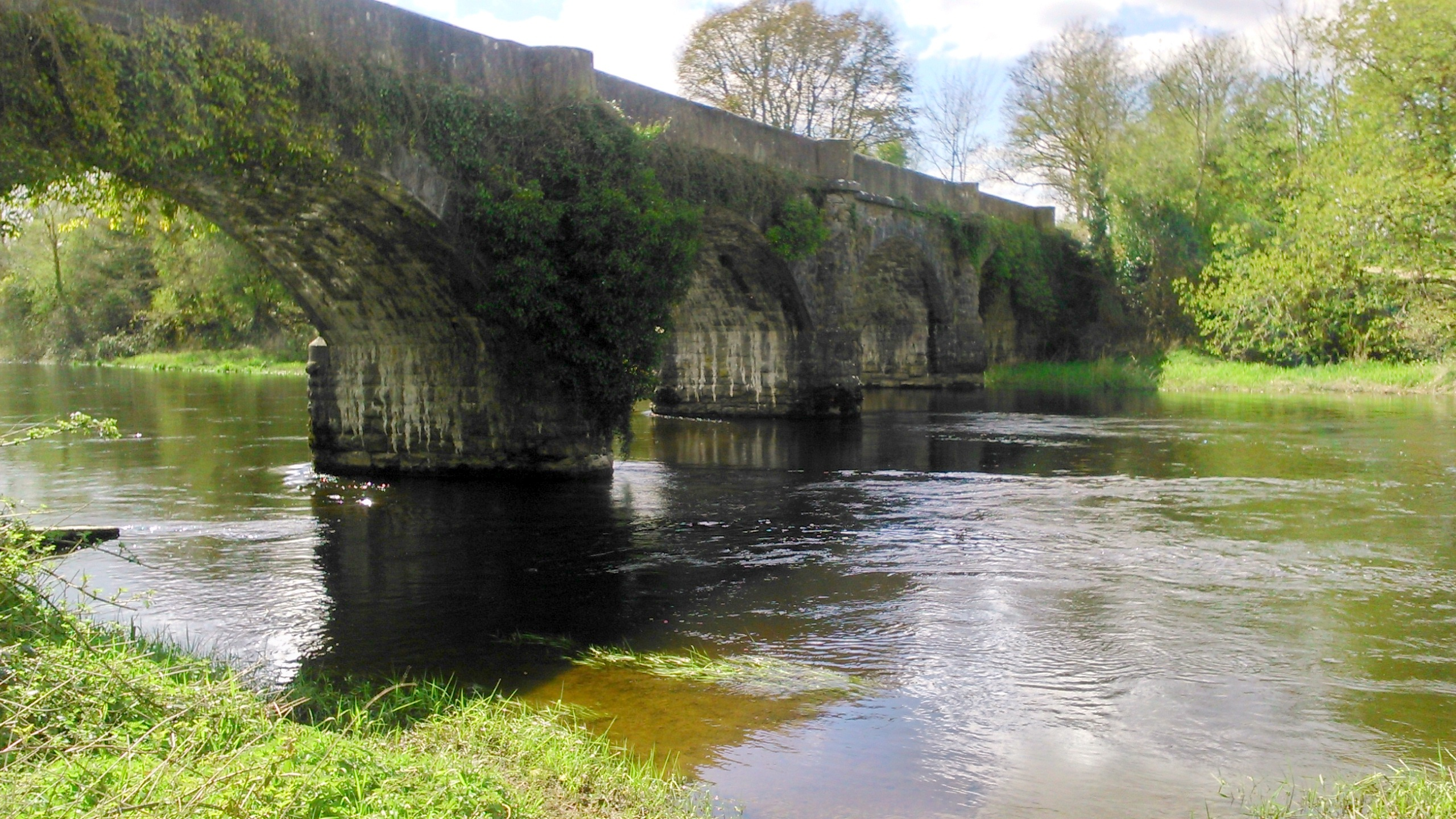
The former viaduct spanning the River Erne.

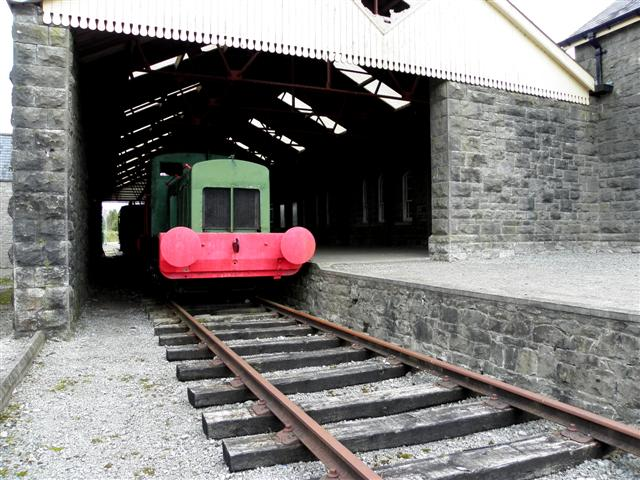
Track inside the station.

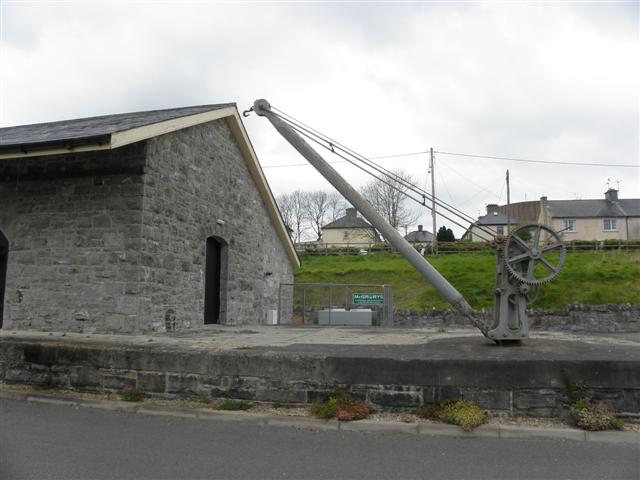
Winch at the station.

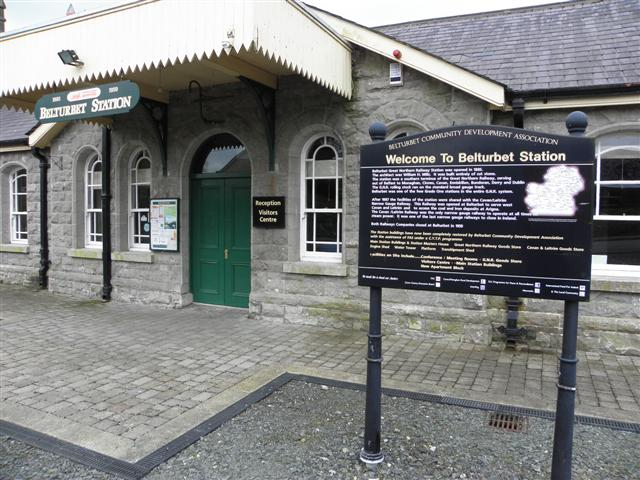
Station entrance.
