= Drumhawnagh railway station =

Railway station in Ireland

Drumhawnagh

General information
- Location: Drumhawnagh, County Cavan; Ireland
- Coordinates: 53.872536°N 7.452363°W
- Platforms: 1
- Tracks: 1

Construction
- Structure type: Wooden waiting room, goods shed, crossing keepers house. All extant

History
- Original company: Cavan Junction Railway
- Pre-grouping: Midland Great Western Railway

Key dates
- 1877: Station opened
- 1947: Station closed to passengers
- 1959: last passenger special
- 1960: line closed to all traffic
Location

Drumhawnagh (Drumhowna) Railway Station near Loughduff in County Cavan, Ireland was a former station on the Inny Junction to Cavan branch of the Midland Great Western Railway, Ireland. It opened in 1877 and closed in 1947. The previous station along the dismantled branch was Ballywillan whereas the next station along the dismantled branch to Cavan is Crossdoney.

| Preceding station | Disused railways | Following station |
|---|---|---|
| Ballywillan | Midland Great Western Railway; Inny Junction-Cavan | Crossdoney |

== See also ==
- List of closed railway stations in Ireland
