= Redhills railway station =

Railway station in Ireland

Redhills

General information
- Location: Killyfana Road; Redhills, County Cavan; Ireland
- Platforms: 1

History
- Pre-grouping: Great Northern Railway

Key dates
- 1 December 1873: Station opened
- 14 October 1957: Station closed to passengers
- 1 June 1958: Station closed completely
Location

Redhills was a former station on the Cavan to Clones Great Northern Railway (Ireland) line eight and a half miles north east of the town of Cavan opened on 1 December 1873.

== See also ==
- List of closed railway stations in Ireland

Preceding station	Disused railways	Following station
Ballyhaise	Great Northern Railway; Cavan-Portadown	Clones
