= Foxrock railway station =

Former railway station in County Dublin, Ireland

Foxrock Carraig an tSionnaigh
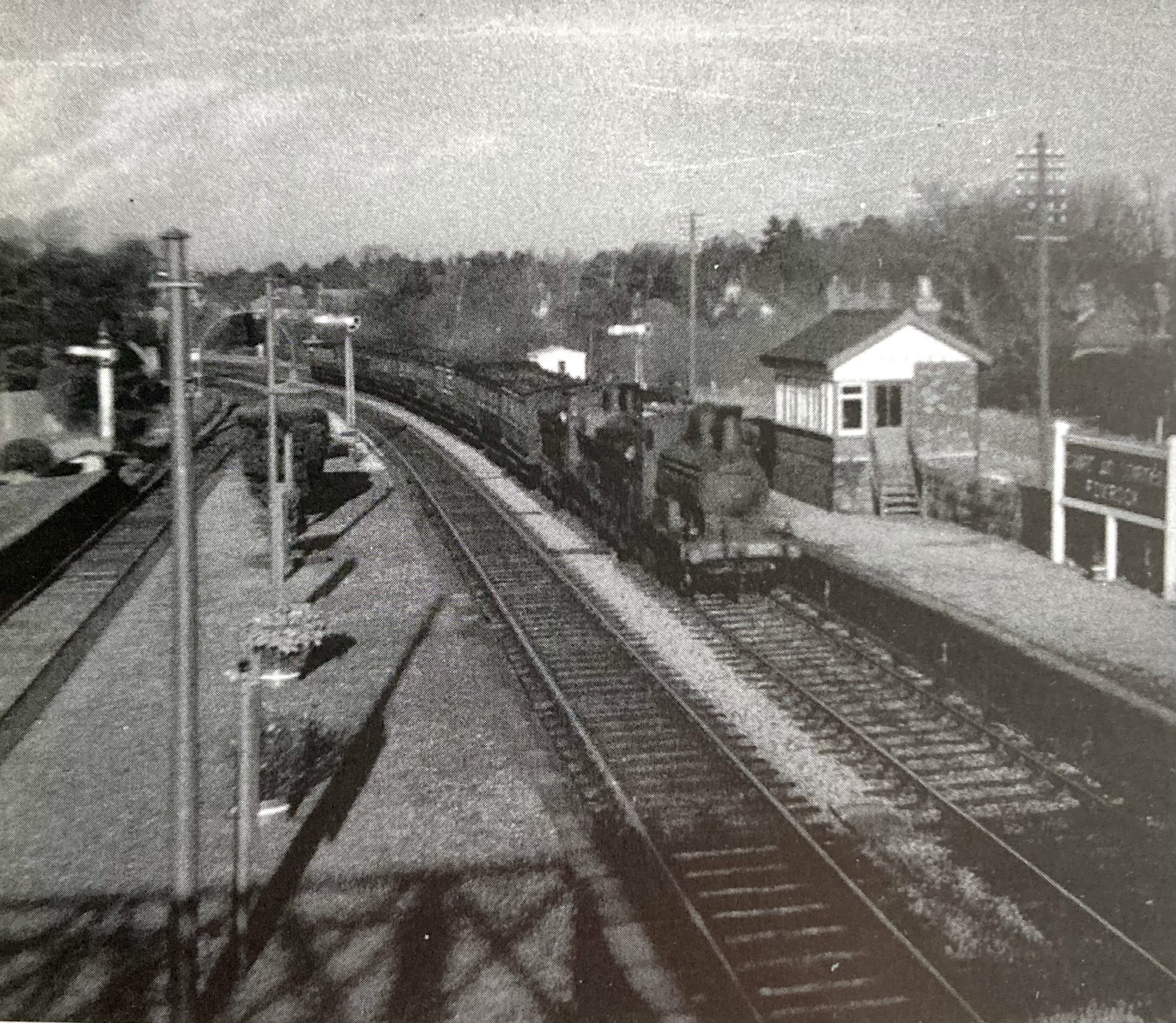
- Double-headed Sea Breeze special passing Foxrock in 1953

General information
- Location: Brighton Road; Foxrock, County Dublin; Ireland
- Coordinates: 53.267°N 6.185°W
- Platforms: 3

Construction
- Structure type: At-grade

History
- Original company: Dublin, Wicklow and Wexford Railway
- Pre-grouping: Dublin and South Eastern Railway
- Post-grouping: Great Southern Railways

Key dates
- 1859: Temporary platform built and briefly opened
- 1 August 1861: Station officially opens
- 1888: Third platform and sidings added
- 31 December 1958: Station closed
Location

Foxrock railway station was a station in on the Harcourt Street railway line. It served the suburb of Foxrock, in County Dublin, Ireland.

== History ==
Foxrock station was opened by the Dublin, Wicklow and Wexford Railway (DW&WR) on 1 August 1861, as part of the Harcourt Street line. A temporary platform had been provided there in 1859, before the complete station was finished in 1861. The station opened as "Foxrock and Leopardstown" and retained that name until 1921, when it was shortened to Foxrock.

The station served as a connection to Leopardstown Racecourse and was very busy on race days, with many special trains running there. Renamed "Boghill", it was a major setting for Samuel Beckett's 1957 radio play All That Fall.

=== Closure ===
Use of the Harcourt Street line had declined during the early 20th century and it had become run down in the 1940s and 1950s. The station was closed by Córas Iompair Éireann on 31 December 1958, along with the whole Harcourt Street line, despite opposition from the community.

The disused station building remained until the 1990s, when it was demolished to make way for a housing development. A small, disused ticket office remains in the grounds of Leopardstown Racecourse, directly adjacent to the site of the old station house. The office was operated not by the railway but by the racecourse, to cater for patrons travelling by train on race days.

The Luas green line has reused most of the route of the Harcourt Street line, but it bypasses Foxrock in favour of the busier suburbs of Stepaside, Leopardstown and Ballyogan, rejoining the former track bed at Carrickmines, which is the nearest Luas stop to Foxrock. Most of the alignment has not been built on however, making an extension possible, although that is not currently planned.

== Layout ==
Foxrock was quite a large station, boasting three platforms. The third platform was nicknamed the "racecourse" platform, as it was adjacent to Leopardstown Racecourse and connected to it by a pathway. The platforms were all linked by a typical, but long, DWWR/DSER footbridge. The station building, was also a typical DWR structure, and was located on the down platform, along with the DSER brick signal cabin. There were additional sidings to both the north and south of the station.

Preceding station	Disused railways	Following station
Stillorgan; Line and station closed	Dublin and South Eastern Railway; Harcourt Street line	Carrickmines; Line and station closed

== See also ==
- List of closed railway stations in Ireland
