= Arva Road railway station =

Railway station in County Cavan, Ireland

Arva Road

General information
- Location: Arva Road, County Cavan; Ireland

History
- Pre-grouping: Midland Great Western Railway

Key dates
- 1886: Station opened
- 1947: Station closed to passengers
- 1952: last passenger special
- 1955: line closed to all traffic
- 1957: line lifted

Services
Preceding station	Disused railways	Following station
Crossdoney	Midland Great Western Railway; Killashandra branch	Killashandra
Location

Arva Road railway station in County Cavan, Ireland was a former station on the Killashandra branch of the Midland Great Western Railway, Ireland.

The Ordnance Survey of Ireland Discovery Series 1:50,000 map no. 34 shows the station locale.

== See also ==
- List of closed railway stations in Ireland
