= Float railway station =

Former station in Ireland

Float

General information
- Location: Lisduff, County Westmeath; Ireland
- Coordinates: 53.7095°N 7.4474°W
- Elevation: 219 ft (67 m)
- Platforms: 1

Construction
- Structure type: Two story station house and goods shed, both extant.

History
- Pre-grouping: Midland Great Western Railway

Key dates
- 1856 (8 July): station opened
- 1944 (24 April): station closed
- 1945 (10 December): station reopens
- 1947: station closed to passengers
- 1959: last passenger special
- 1960: line closed to all traffic
Location

Float Railway Station was a former station on the Inny Junction to Cavan branch of the Midland Great Western Railway, Ireland. It opened in 1856 and closed in 1947. Due to the fuel shortage caused by World War Two, the station was closed for over a year and a half in 1944–1945.

Preceding station	Disused railways	Following station
Inny Junction	Midland Great Western Railway; Inny Junction-Cavan	Ballywillan
