= Ballycastle Railway =

Defunct railway in Northern Ireland

Coordinates: 55.205°N 6.247°W

Overview
- Dates of operation: 1880–1950

Technical
- Track gauge: 3 ft (914 mm)
- Length: 16 miles 11 chains (26.0 km) (1922)
- Track length: 18 miles 19 chains (29.4 km) (1922)

Ballycastle Railway was a 3 ft (914 mm) narrow gauge railway line which ran from Ballycastle to Ballymoney, both in County Antrim, Northern Ireland.

== History ==
Ballycastle Railway Act 1878
- Act of Parliament
- Parliament of the United Kingdom
- Long title: An Act to authorise the construction of a Railway in the County of Antrim from Ballymoney to Ballycastle; and for other purposes.
- Citation: 41 & 42 Vict. c. cxcv

Dates
- Royal assent: 22 July 1878

Text of statute as originally enacted

London Midland and Scottish Railway (Ballycastle Railway Vesting) Act (Northern Ireland) 1925
- Act of Parliament
- Parliament of Northern Ireland
- Long title: An Act to provide for the Vesting of the Under taking of the Ballycastle Railway Company in the London Midland and Scottish Railway Company and for other purposes.
- Citation: 15 & 16 Geo. 5. c. ii (N.I.)

Dates
- Royal assent: 9 June 1925

Text of statute as originally enacted

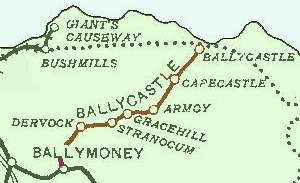
The line in 1906

Ballycastle Railway was authorised by the Ballycastle Railway Act 1878 (41 & 42 Vict. c. cxcv), and opened in October 1880 and ran 17 miles (27 km) from Ballymoney, on the Belfast and Northern Counties Railway (BNCR), later Northern Counties Committee (NCC), main line to Derry, to Ballycastle. It was never a very profitable enterprise and eventually closed down on 24 March 1924. It was rescued by the NCC, which took it over completely on 4 May of the same year. It reopened on 11 August, although the legal change of ownership was not confirmed until the next year by the London Midland and Scottish Railway (Ballycastle Railway Vesting) Act (Northern Ireland) 1925 (15 & 16 Geo. 5. c. ii (N.I.))

Services mainly consisted of three return journeys each day, taking between 50 minutes and an hour. At the start there were three Black Hawthorn 0-6-0ST engines and two Kitson 4-4-2T engines arrived in 1908. Initially carriages were of the compartment type painted two shades of brown, until largely displaced by LMS-designed corridor carriages transferred from the Ballymena and Larne Railway in 1933. The Ballycastle Railway closed in July 1950.

== Nationalisation and closure ==
Under the terms of the Transport Act 1947 the London, Midland and Scottish Railway, the NCC's parent company, was nationalised by the British Government on 1 January 1948. The NCC (and the Ballycastle Railway) was thus briefly owned by the British Transport Commission. This was only a temporary measure and in 1949 the NCC was transferred to the Ulster Transport Authority (UTA) – owned by the Government of Northern Ireland. The UTA soon embarked on a major programme of railway closures, notably including much of the Belfast and County Down Railway. The Ballycastle Railway was one of the casualties; the UTA closed the line to all services on 3 July 1950.

== Route ==
- Ballymoney railway station
- Dervock railway station, 4 1/2 miles (7.2 km)
- Stranocum railway station, 6 3/4 miles (10.9 km)
- Gracehill railway station, 8 1/4 miles (13.3 km), opened 1 December 1890
- Armoy railway station, 10 1/4 miles (16.5 km)
- Balleeny Siding, 11 miles (18 km)
- Capecastle railway station, 13 miles (21 km), opened 1 February 1882
- Ballast Pit, 15 miles (24 km)
- Tow Viaduct, 16 miles (26 km)
- Ballycastle railway station, 16 1/4 miles (26.2 km)

== See also ==
- List of narrow-gauge railways in Ireland

=== Other narrow gauge railways in Ulster ===
- Ballymena, Cushendall and Red Bay Railway
- Ballymena and Larne Railway
- Castlederg and Victoria Bridge Tramway
- Cavan and Leitrim Railway
- Clogher Valley Railway
- County Donegal Railways Joint Committee
- Londonderry and Lough Swilly Railway
