= Ballyhaise railway station =

Former railway station in Ireland

Ballyhaise
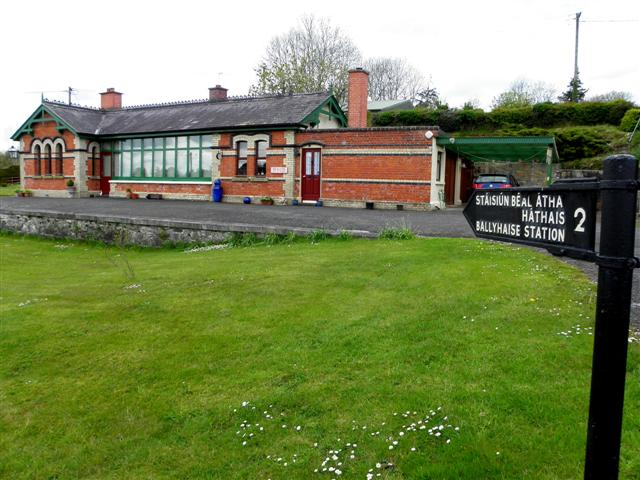
- Ballyhaise station in 2012

General information
- Location: Ballyhaise, County Cavan; Ireland
- Platforms: 3

History
- Pre-grouping: Great Northern Railway

Key dates
- 1862: Station opens as Belturbet Junction
- 1885: Station renamed Ballyhaise
- 14 October 1957: Station closes to passengers
- 1 January 1960: Station closes to all traffic
- 1961: Line lifted

Services
| Preceding station | Great Northern Railway (Ireland) | Following station |
|---|---|---|
| Loreto College Halt | Cavan-Portadown | Redhills |
| Loreto College Halt | Belturbet branch | Belturbet |
Location

Ballyhaise was a former junction station on the Cavan to Clones Great Northern Railway (Ireland) line six and a half miles north east of the town of Cavan. The station building and platform is still extant though in private ownership. Until 1885 it was known as Belturbet Junction.

== See also ==
- List of closed railway stations in Ireland: B
