= Loreto College Halt =

Railway station in Ireland

General information
- Location: Cavan, County Cavan; Ireland
- Coordinates: 54.012929°N 7.376612°W
- Elevation: 164 ft (50 m)
- Platforms: 1
- Tracks: 1

Construction
- Structure type: Halt

History
- Pre-grouping: Great Northern Railway

Key dates
- 1930: station opened
- 1957: station closed
- 1960: line closed to all traffic
- 1961: line lifted
Location

Loreto College Halt was a former halt on the Cavan to Clones Great Northern Railway (Ireland) line two miles from the town of Cavan. The halt opened to coincide with the opening of Loreto College in Cavan, a secondary school of the same name. The school remains open.

== Routes ==
| Preceding station | Disused railways | Following station |
|---|---|---|
| Cavan | Great Northern Railway; Clones-Cavan | Ballyhaise |

== See also ==
- List of closed railway stations in Ireland: L
