= Nancy (locomotive) =

Narrow gauge steam locomotive

NANCY
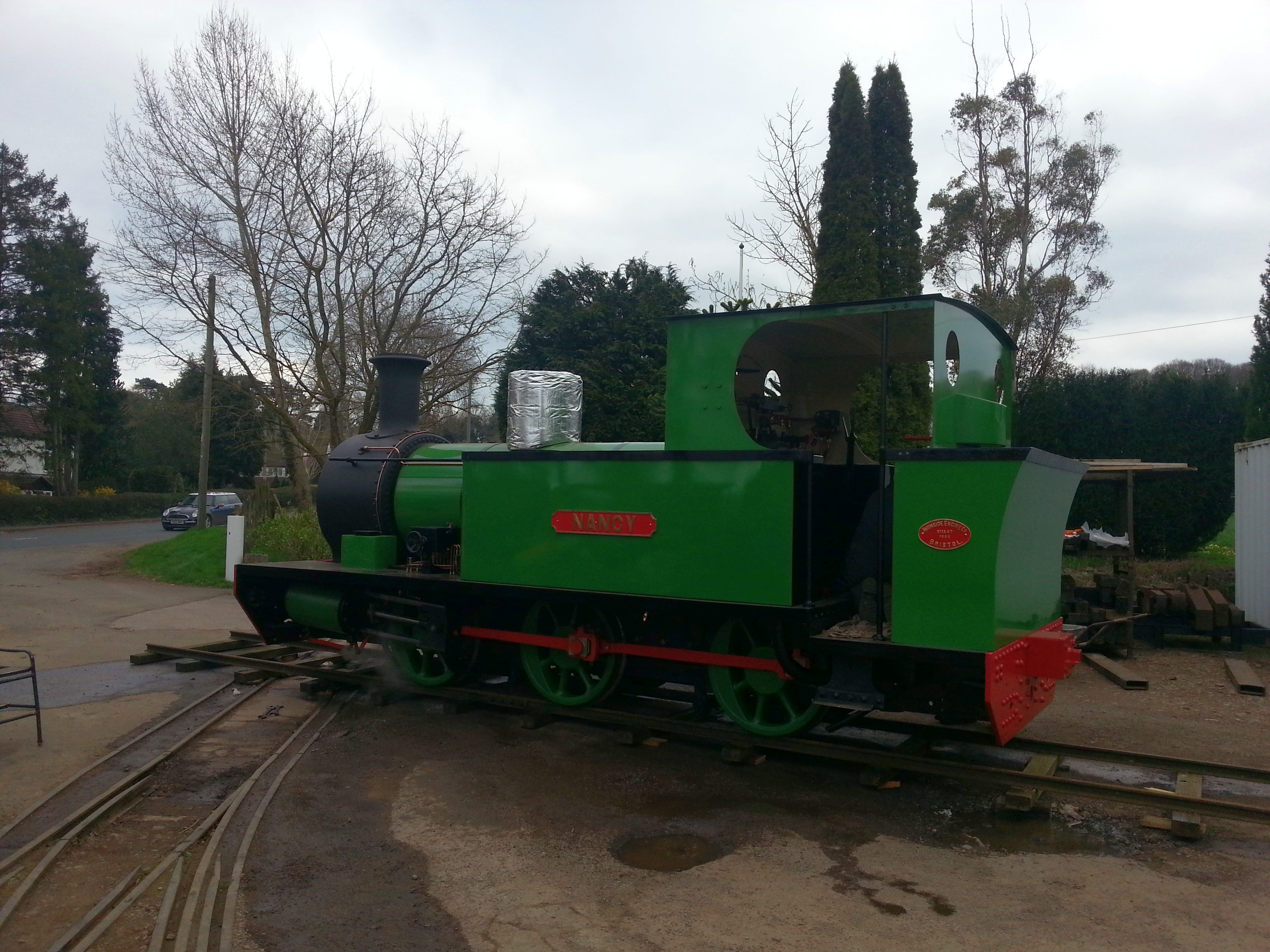
- Nancy at Alan Keef's workshop
Type and origin
- Power type: Steam
- Builder: Avonside Engine Company
- Serial number: 1547
- Build date: 1908
Specifications
- Configuration
  - Whyte: 0-6-0T
- Gauge: 3 ft (914 mm)
- Cylinders: Two, outside
Career
- Operators: Cavan and Leitrim Railway

Nancy is a narrow gauge steam locomotive. It was built by Avonside Engine Company in 1908 for industrial service. It was in use until 1961, when it was acquired for preservation. After many years of effort and long storage, it was returned to working order in April 2019, and was then moved to its current owners, the Cavan and Leitrim Railway in Ireland.

== Industrial history ==
Nancy was bought in 1908 by the Stanton Ironworks Company's for use on their Brewer's Grave Tramway connecting to the Woolsthorpe ironstone quarries in Leicestershire.

In 1950, the locomotive was sold to the Eastwell Iron Ore Company for use on their tramway at Eastwell, Leicestershire. She ran there until 21 October 1959, when the tramway shut down, though the line was kept intact as a standby to the replacement road system. On 28 August 1960, the Birmingham Locomotive Club ran a farewell train, hauled by Nancy. The final steaming of Nancy took place on 31 August which was also the final use of the tramway.

== Preservation ==
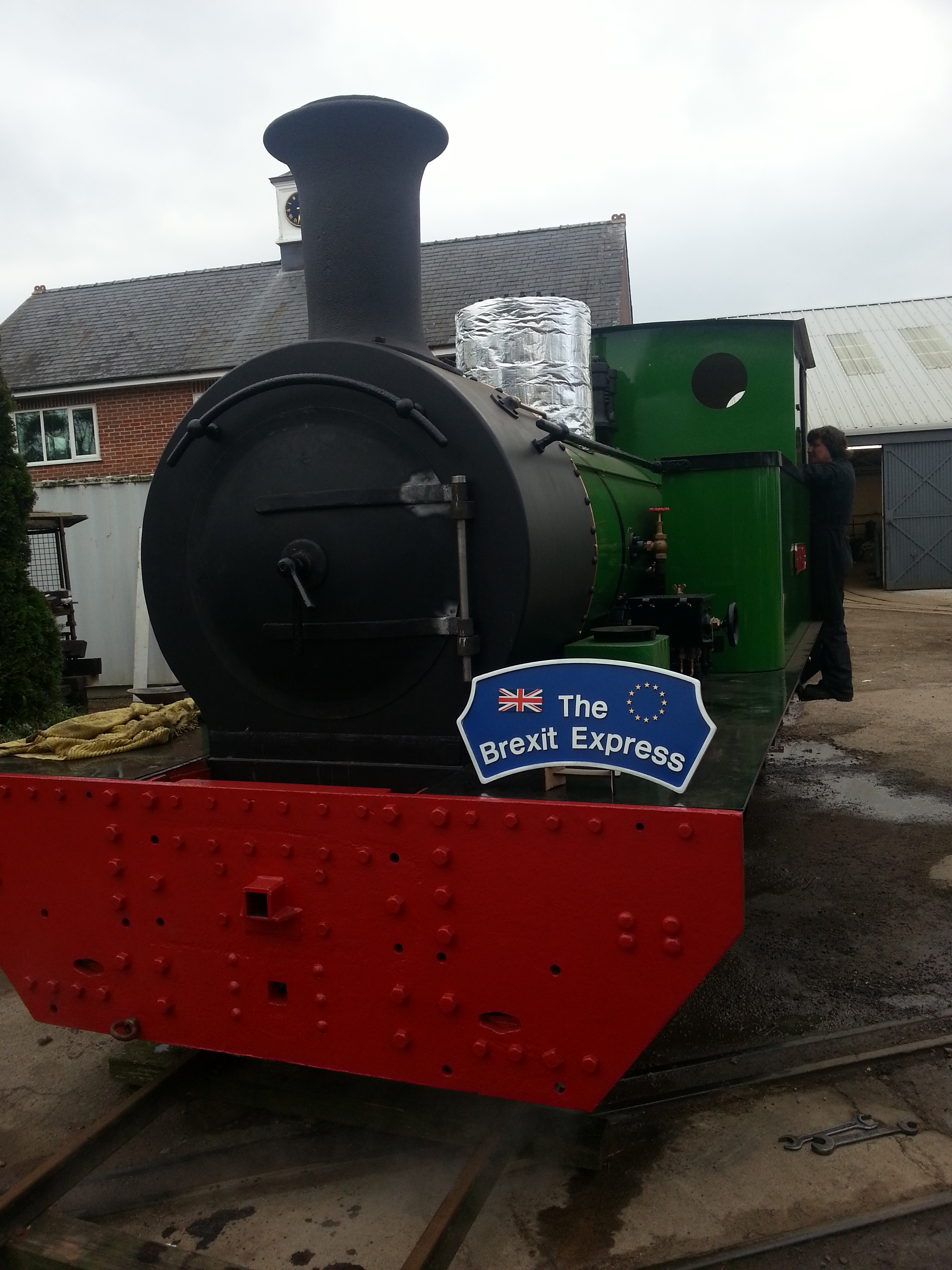
Nancy on the first steaming day, at Alan Keef's workshop

Nancy was acquired in 1961 by a group in Watnall, Nottinghamshire with a view to preservation. In 1972, the loco was sold to Lord O'Neill for his Shane's Castle Railway in County Antrim.

Nancy was bought by the Cavan & Leitrim Railway in 1997, still in unrestored condition. In 1999, the locomotive was moved to Alan Keef in England for restoration to working order. Although work began there, it came to a halt owing to a downturn in the Irish economy and the loco was then stored for a number of years. The work took twenty years to complete, and Nancy steamed for the first time on 23 March 2019. The chance of Brexit gave increased impetus to this work, as shipping the locomotive back to Ireland from an England which had by-then left the EU gave a risk of attracting import duties or VAT. The locomotive was shipped back to Ireland, and was run on the restored Cavan and Leitrim Railway in April 2019.
