= Killashandra railway station =

Disused railway station in County Cavan, Ireland

Killashandra
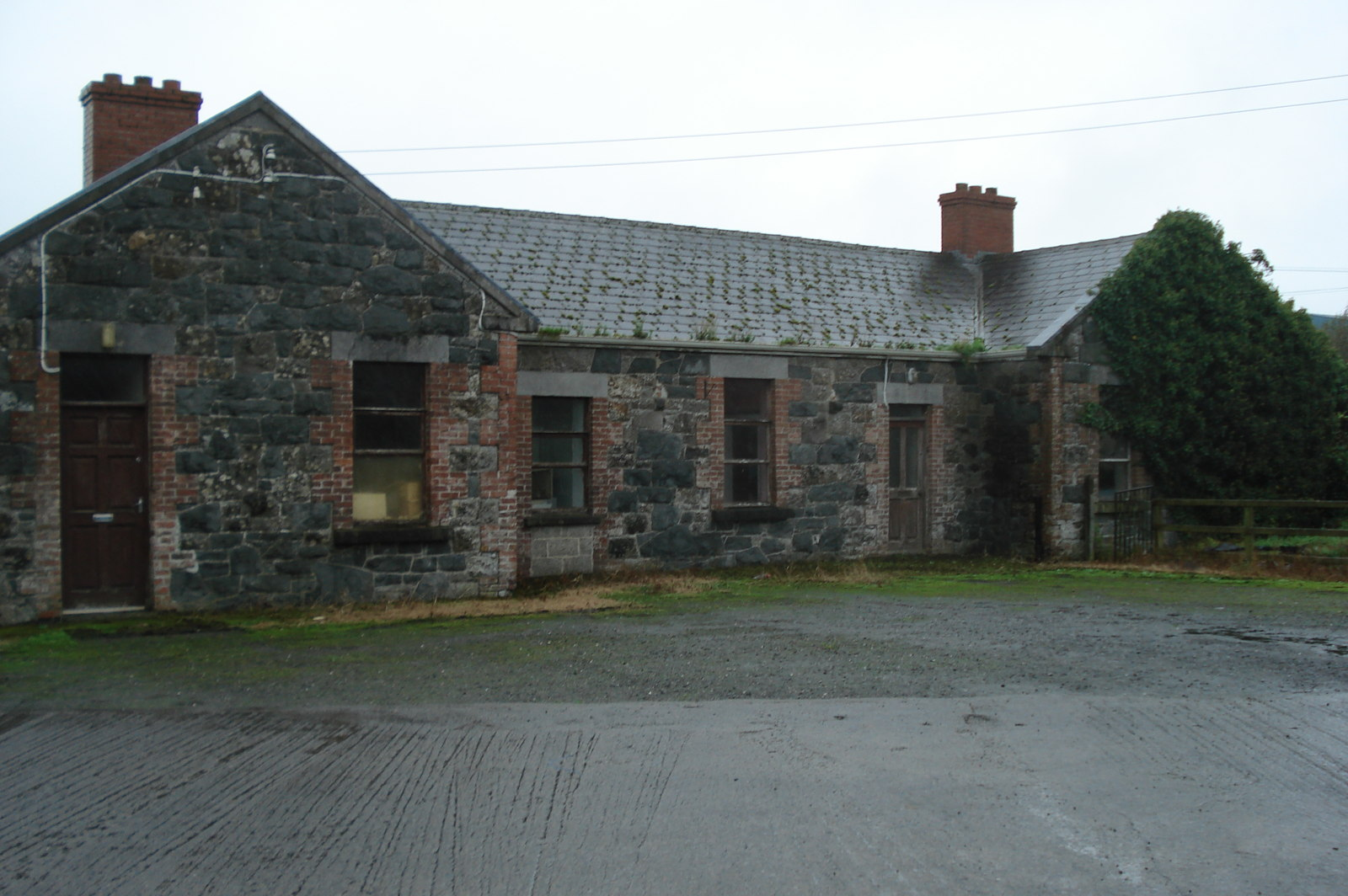
- Killeshandra Railway Station, now owned by Lakeland Dairies and becoming derelict.

General information
- Location: Killeshandra, County Cavan; Ireland

History
- Pre-grouping: Midland Great Western Railway

Key dates
- 1886: Station opened
- 1947: Station closed to passengers
- 1952: last passenger special
- 1955: line closed to all traffic
- 1957: line lifted
Location

Killashandra railway station in County Cavan, Ireland was the terminus station at the end of the Midland Great Western Railway seven mile branch from Crossdoney.

Preceding station	Disused railways	Following station
Arva Road	Midland Great Western Railway; Killashandra branch	Terminus

== See also ==
- List of closed railway stations in Ireland
