= All That Fall =

Play written by Samuel Beckett

- All That Fall: A Play for Radio, London: Faber and Faber, 1957
- Original language: English
- Written by: Samuel Beckett
- Characters: Maddy Rooney
- Genre: Radio play
- Setting: Country road, railway station

Premiere
- Date: 1957

All That Fall is a one-act radio play by Samuel Beckett produced following a request from the BBC. It was written in English and completed in September 1956. The autograph copy is titled Lovely Day for the Races. It was published in French, in a translation by Robert Pinget revised by Beckett himself, as Tous ceux qui tombent.

When the germ of All that Fall came to him, Beckett wrote to a friend, Nancy Cunard:

"Never thought about radio play technique but in the dead of t’other night got a nice gruesome idea full of cartwheels and dragging of feet and puffing and panting which may or may not lead to something."

Although the play was written quickly and with few redrafts, the subject matter was deeply personal, causing Beckett to sink into what he called "a whirl of depression" when he wrote to his US publisher Barney Rosset in August. In fact, in September "he cancelled all his appointments in Paris for a week simply because he felt wholly incapable of facing people", and worked on the script until its completion.

It was first broadcast on the BBC Third Programme on 13 January 1957, featuring Mary O'Farrell as Maddy Rooney with J. G. Devlin as her husband, Dan. Soon-to-be Beckett regulars, Patrick Magee and Jack MacGowran also had small parts. The producer was Donald McWhinnie.

== Synopsis ==
=== The trip there ===
It is the first work by Beckett in which a woman is the central character. In this case it is a gritty, "overwhelmingly capacious", outspoken, Irish septuagenarian, Maddy Rooney, plagued by "rheumatism and childlessness". "Beckett emphasised to Billie Whitelaw that Maddy had an Irish accent:

'I said, "Like yours," and he said, "No, no, no, an Irish accent." I realised he didn't know he had an Irish accent, and that was the music he heard in his head.'"

The opening scene finds Maddy trudging down a country road towards the station called "Boghill". It's her husband's birthday. She has already given him a tie but decides to surprise him by meeting him off the 12:30 train. It is a fine June morning and must be a Saturday, since her husband is leaving his office at noon rather than five. In the distance the sounds of rural animals are heard.

She moves with difficulty. She hears chamber music coming from an old house, Schubert's "Death and the Maiden". She stops, listens to the recording, and even murmurs along with it before proceeding.

The first of her three encounters with men is meeting the dung carrier, Christy, who tries to sell her a "small load of … stydung". She tells him she will consult her husband. The man's cart is being pulled by a "cleg-tormented" hinny, which shows some reluctance to move on and needs to be whipped. As she heads off, Maddy's thoughts return to "Minnie! Little Minnie!"

The smell of laburnum distracts her. Suddenly, old Mr Tyler is upon her, ringing his cycle bell. Whilst relating how his daughter's operation has rendered her unable to bear children, they are almost knocked down by Connolly's van, which covers them "white with dust from head to foot". Maddy again bemoans the loss of Minnie but refuses to be comforted by Tyler, who rides off, despite realising that his rear tyre is flat.

Lastly an "old admirer", Mr Slocum, a racecourse clerk, pulls up in his "limousine" to offer her a ride. She is too fat and awkward to climb in alone so Slocum pushes her in from behind. While doing so, her frock gets caught in the door. He tries to start the car but it has died. After applying the choke he does manage to get going and, no sooner has he done so, he runs over and kills a hen, which Maddy feels the need to eulogise.

At each stage of the journey, the technology she encounters advances but, despite that, each means of locomotion is beset by problems, foreshadowing the problem with the train: she finds walking difficult and is forced to sit down, Christy needs to whip his hinny to make her go, Tyler's tyre goes flat, and Slocum's engine dies. All the relatives mentioned in that section are female and all the modes of transport are also referred to as females.

=== The station ===
At the station, Slocum calls on the porter, Tommy, for assistance to extricate his passenger, after which he drives away, "crucifying his gearbox."

Beckett told Billie Whitelaw that Maddy "is in a state of abortive explosiveness". That becomes apparent when she considers herself ignored. To the boy, Tommy, she says abrasively: "Don’t mind me. Don’t take any notice of me. I do not exist. The fact is well known." As Ruby Cohn quips, "she endures volubly."

The stationmaster, Mr Barrell, asks after Mrs Rooney's health. She confesses that she should really still be in bed. We hear of the demise of Mr Barrell's father, who died shortly after retiring, a tale that reminds Maddy again of her own woes. She notes that the weather has taken a change for the worse, with the wind picking up and rain due.

Miss Fitt approaches, so immersed in humming a hymn she doesn't see Maddy at first. As her name indicates, Miss Fitt is a self-righteous misfit. After some discussion, she condescends to help the old woman up the stairs to the platform, primarily because "it is the Protestant thing to do."

Unusually, the train is late. The noise of the station becomes louder but the first arrival is an anticlimax, because it is the oft-mentioned "up mail". Dan's train comes in moments afterwards. Maddy panics. She can't find her husband because he has been led to the gents by Jerry, the boy who normally helps him to the taxi. Tight-fisted Dan chides her for not cancelling Jerry but still pays his penny fee. He refuses, however, to discuss the reason for the train's lateness. Not without some difficulty – her husband is also not a well man – they descend the stairs and begin the trek home.

On her journey to the station, Maddy only had to compete with one person at a time, each an old man. Now she is faced with a crowd. Rather than the flat open countryside, she has to contend with a mountainous climb, referring to the stairs as a "cliff". Her husband calls them a "precipice" and Miss Fitt compares them to the "Matterhorn", a mountain that for years inspired fear in climbers. Also, the means of transport that are mentioned, the Titanic, the Lusitania and the train, are modes of mass transport, and the level of danger shifts from the inconvenient to the potentially lethal. All the relatives mentioned in that segment are now male.

=== The walk home ===
The weather is worsening. The thought of getting home spurs them on. Dan imagines sitting by the fire in his dressing gown with his wife reading aloud from Effi Briest. The Lynch twins jeer at them from a distance. Dan shakes his stick and chases them off. Previously, the twins have pelted the old couple with mud. "Did you ever wish to kill a child?" Dan asks her, then admits to having to resist the impulse within himself. That makes his comment shortly after, about being alone in his compartment — "I made no attempt to restrain myself" — all the more suspicious. It also focuses attention on his remarks about the pros and cons of retirement: one of the negatives he brings up has to do with enduring their neighbour's children.

Dan is as laconic as Maddy is loquacious. His refusal to explain why the train was delayed forces her to pester him with questions, which he does his best to avoid answering. He prevaricates and digresses — anything to throw her off track. Eventually he maintains that he honestly has no clue what the cause was. Being blind and on his own he had simply assumed the train had stopped at a station.

Something Dan says reminds Maddy of a visit she once made to hear "a lecture by one of these new mind doctors. What she heard there was the story of a patient the doctor had failed to cure, a young girl who was dying, and "did in fact die, shortly after he had washed his hands of her." The reason the doctor gave for the girl's death, as if the revelation had just come to him there and then, was: "The trouble with her was that she had never really been born!"

As they near the house Maddy passed earlier, Schubert's music is still playing and Dan starts to cry. To stop her asking questions, he asks Maddy about the text of Sunday's sermon. "The Lord upholdeth all that fall and raiseth up all those that be bowed down", she tells him, and then they both burst out laughing. Mr Slocum and Miss Fitt had both passed comment on Maddy's bent posture. Perhaps, that is partly why they laugh: it is the best reaction to a life of unending misery in a world devoid of any God. In Happy Days, Winnie asks "How can one better magnify the Almighty than by sniggering with him at his little jokes, particularly the poorer ones". It is worthy of mention that "it is Mr Tyler, rather than the Lord, who saved the preacher’s life when they were climbing together". It would be fair to assume that Maddy doesn’t really believe in a god any more, after she says, "We are alone. There is no one to ask." She is certainly not talking about there being no one to ask about her husband's age.

Jerry catches them up to return something Mr Rooney has dropped. Learning that it is some kind of ball, he demands the boy hand it to him. When pressed by his wife, all he will say is that: "It is a thing I carry about with me", and becomes angry when pressed on the subject. They have no small change so promise to give Jerry a penny on Monday to compensate him for his trouble.

Just as the boy starts back, Maddy calls him to see if he has learned what delayed the train. He has, but Dan doesn't want to know: "Leave the boy alone, he knows nothing! Come on!". However, his wife insists. Jerry tells her that it was a child, at which point her husband groans. When pushed for details the boy goes on: "It was a little child fell out of the carriage, Ma’am … Onto the line, Ma’am … Under the wheels, Ma’am." We assume the child is a girl – all the foreshadowing in the play has been pointing to that – but, crucially, Beckett never actually says. (See his comment to Kay Boyle below however).

With that, Jerry exits. We hear his steps die away and the couple head off in silence. Maddy must realise the death happened while she was making her way to the station but she is, for once, speechless. All we are left with is the wind and the rain, and the question what, if anything, Mr Rooney had to do with the death of the child.

The third section of the play returns Maddy to the relative calm of the walk home. They encounter a further three people, only this time they are all children. The laburnum also serves as an important benchmark. In the opening scene Maddy admires it but now its condition has deteriorated. The weather has also continued to worsen until, at the end, they are in the middle of a "[t]empest of wind and rain". The actor David Warrilow relates: "When I saw Beckett in January, one of the first things he said was: 'What do you think of All That Fall?’... [Later I asked him the same question.] And he looked down and said, 'Well, a number of weaknesses'. [I asked:] 'Do you mean the production?’ He said, 'No, no, no. The writing.'... 'What I really was waiting for was the rain at the end.'"

In 1961, Kay Boyle asked Beckett if, at the end of Happy Days, Willie is reaching for the gun, or for his wife. Beckett replied:

"The question as to which Willie is 'after' – Winnie or the revolver – is like the question in All That Fall as to whether Mr Rooney threw the little girl out of the railway-carriage or not. And the answer is the same in both cases – we don’t know, at least I don’t … I know creatures are supposed to have no secrets for their authors, but I’m afraid mine for me have little else."

== Biographical details ==
When writing in French, Beckett stripped his text of biographical detail in an attempt to universalise his characters. With his return to English, he also returned to the Dublin suburb of Foxrock for the radio play. Apart from many uses of common Irish words and phrases, Beckett pulls names, characters and locations from his childhood to deliver a realistic setting for the drama, which is still presented in a manner almost everyone can relate to.

1. Beckett’s mother shopped at Connolly’s Stores in Cornelscourt and her purchases were delivered by van as was customary at the time.
2. Maddy’s journey is from "Brighton Road to Foxrock station" (called Boghill station in the play) and back again.
3. James Knowlson claims that Maddy was actually inspired by Beckett's kindergarten teacher Ida "Jack" Elsner. In her later years, when she had trouble riding her bicycle, she was known to fall off and be found "sprawling by the roadside until such a time as a passer-by [might come] along to help her up" in a state similar to Maddy after leaving Christy.
4. "The Becketts employed a gardener called Christy."
5. Beckett bought apples from a market-gardener named Watt Tyler on his walk home from school. The Tylers and Becketts also shared a pew at Tullow Church, the church referred to in the text.
6. Slocum was the surname of his cousin John Beckett's future wife, Vera.
7. Mr Tully was a local dairyman.
8. Dunne, Maddy's maiden name, was the local butcher on Bray Road.
9. Miss Fitt's name, aside from being a wonderful pun, may have been inspired by a classmate of Beckett's at Portora School named E.G. Fitt or a Rathgar lady resident.
10. The racecourse is Leopardstown Racecourse.
11. Mr Barrell's name is a nod to Thomas Farrell, "the persnickety railroad stationmaster in the Foxrock of his youth" who often took first prize for the "best-kept" station on the line.
12. When Maddy mentions that the preacher for Sunday is to be Hardy, Dan wonders if this is the author of "How to be Happy though Married?" "There was in Foxrock, in Kerrymount Avenue, a Rev E. Hardy, not to be confused with Edward John Hardy, the author" of the aforementioned book.

Of course, "[t]he events in Beckett's life leave their traces in the shape of his work, without necessarily leaving an inventory in its content."

== Interpretation ==
Q: "Why did the chicken cross the road?"
A: "To get to the other side."

MRS ROONEY: It is suicide to be abroad.

"All That Fall manages to develop a highly dynamic genre in radio drama through a multi-layered script, which can be read as tragicomedy, a murder mystery, a cryptic literary riddle or a quasi-musical score."

=== Death ===
1. Schubert's Death and the Maiden is heard at the start and near the end of the drama, setting the theme from the outset.
2. All parts of the laburnum are poisonous; "children should be warned never to touch the black seeds contained within the pods as they contain an alkaloid poison."
3. Maddy's daughter, Minnie, appears to have died as a child. Vivian Mercier goes so far as to suppose that the child may only ever have existed in Maddy's imagination a view supported by Rosemary Pountney.
4. Maddy tells Tyler: "It is suicide to be abroad." The pun is often commented on (i.e. a broad). The alternative would be to remain fœtus-like in the womb of the home. "The topography in All That Fall is distinctly hostile to the females – human or animal – who try to walk through it. Maddy’s comment 'It is suicide to be a broad' suggests that her death will be her own fault, namely the fault of being born a woman."
5. When she arrives at the station Maddy describes herself in such a way as to conjure up the image of a corpse being shrouded for burial.
6. She recalls the lecture where the doctor spoke about a young girl who died.
7. Slocum’s car dies and is started again only with difficulty.
8. No sooner having done so it runs over a chicken crossing the road, killing it.
9. Barrell’s father died a short time after his son took over as stationmaster.
10. When the train arrives – but before she meets her husband Maddy – remarks that Mr Barrell looks as if he has seen a ghost.
11. Her husband comments that she is "struggling with a dead language".
12. Jerry returns "a kind of ball" to Mr Rooney. Although not an obvious symbol of death, this ball is a significant motif of childhood grief for Beckett.
13. Miss Fitt believes she not really of this world and left to herself "would soon be flown … home." "I suppose the truth is, "she tells Mrs Rooney, "I am not there … just not really there at all." (See Footfalls).
14. As she assists Maddy up the stairs she begins to hum the hymn, Lead, Kindly Light, which is one of the tunes reportedly played as the Titanic was sinking.
15. The sinking of the Lusitania is mentioned; 1,198 people died with her, including almost a hundred children.
16. Tyler thinks that Miss Fitt has lost her mother (as in death) but it turns out that she simply cannot find her because the train is late; thus, since the mother is bringing fresh sole (soul), there is still hope that the mother is not lost.
17. A female voice warns young Dolly not to stand close because "one can be sucked under."
18. On their way home Dan asks his wife if she's ever contemplated killing a child.
19. He refers to his time at work as being "buried alive … not even certified death can ever take the place of that". Dan's workplace is at the terminus, the end of the line (pun intended), and, with its "'rest-couch and velvet hangings', the office seems womblike, but a "wombtomb", a womb after life rather than before."
20. Dan thinks he can smell a dead dog in a ditch but is told its only rotting leaves despite the fact that it's only Summer.
21. He also alludes to Matthew 10:29 about the death of sparrows.
22. The play ends, of course, with the revelation that the train was late due to the death of a young child under its wheels.
23. At one point Maddy – who thinks she is still talking to the stationmaster – says: "Then at evening the clouds will part, the setting sun will shine an instant, then sink, behind the hills." This phrase evokes the famous description of the birth astride a grave from Waiting for Godot reminding us that the best of life only lasts an instant before darkness consumes it once more. Beckett emphasises this in All That Fall by making all the characters either young or old, focusing on the beginnings and end of life; the rest is of little consequence.
24. Another Beckettian leitmotif is underlined by a seemingly innocuous remark made by Maddy when other characters take control of the conversation for a moment: "Do not imagine, because I am silent, that I am not present." In radio a character only 'exists' for as long as we can hear him or her. This reminds us of the many Beckett characters that feel compelled to keep talking to prove they exist.

=== Sickness ===
1. Maddy is obese, suffers from rheumatism, "heart and kidney trouble" and has been bed-ridden for some time. On the return journey she twice mentions feeling cold, weak, and faint.
2. When Maddy asks about his "poor" wife Christy replies that she is "no better." Nor is his daughter.
3. Tyler's only optimistic comments are made about the weather. He says, "Ah in spite of all it is a blessed thing to be alive in such weather, and out of hospital." This could be taken to mean he has just come out of hospital – he refers to himself being "half alive" – though it could equally refer to his daughter's recent surgery.
4. Slocum's mother is "fairly comfortable" and he's managing to keep her out of pain.
5. Dan is blind, suffers from an old wound and has a heart condition.
6. Mrs Tully's "husband is in constant pain and beats her unmercifully."

=== Sex ===
1. Tyler and Maddy flirt. Tyler, who had pumped his tire firm before departing, now finds his rear tire flat. He cycles off riding on the rim. As he leaves, Maddy complains about her corset and shouts after him an indecent invitation to unlace her behind a hedge.
2. Mr Slocum (slow come) squeezes Maddy into his car: "I’m coming, Mrs Rooney, I’m coming, give me time, I’m as stiff as yourself." She makes sexual innuendos that she is in a compromising position. She giggles and shouts in delight when she finally gets in the car and Slocum is left panting in exhaustion. The sexual connotation is continued when her dress is ripped in the door. As if actually guilty of adultery, Maddy wonders what her husband will say when he discovers the tear in her dress.
3. Tyler points out that the 12:30 train has not yet arrived and that one can tell by the signal at the "bawdy hour of nine." This is another reference to sex in the play and a humorous one as the stationmaster stifles a guffaw.
4. Maddy tries to get Dan to kiss her at the station but he refuses. Later she asks him to put his arm around her. She says that it will be like old times. He rebuffs her again because he wants to get home quickly so that she can read to him. He says of the book, "I think Effie is going to commit adultery with the Major." That indicates Dan is more interested in the romance of novels than with his wife.

=== Birth ===
If Maddy's entry into the car has sexual connotations, her exit certainly reminds one of childbirth: "Crouch down, Mrs Rooney, crouch down, and get your head in the open … Press her down, sir … Now! She’s coming!"

This is not the only 'birth' in the play. When describing his journey home, particularly the portion during the delay, Dan says it was like "being confined" an expression used to describe the concluding state of pregnancy; from the onset of labour to the birth. "If an underlying birth-scenario seems far-fetched, we might consider Maddy’s cries at the climax of the station scene: 'The up mail! The up mail! (a pun evident earlier in the play) – together with Tommy’s cry: 'She’s coming!’ – and, on the arrival of the down train, the direction (thoroughly in the spirit of the one in Happy Days, which describes Willie as ‘dressed to kill’), 'clashing of couplings'. When Dan finally emerges from 'the men’s' Maddy tells him that it is his birthday." Immediately after this Maddy begins her recollection of the girl who was not properly born.

"If [Dan] has a role, it is perhaps that of the gravedigger/obstetrician of the Godot image '[putting] on the forceps’ ... Between Death and the Maiden he seems to be the mediator." Dan gives birth to death.

=== Children ===
Dan, for example, has no idea what age he is and, if he turned out to be a hundred it wouldn't surprise him – but the young die. If a divine being is behind this then his logic is in question. According to Richard Coe's interpretation of All That Fall, God kills "... without a reason."

==== Girls ====
1. Christy's hinny is sterile.
2. Maddy has no children and has passed the age when she could conceive.
3. When Maddy thinks about where Minnie would be now she pictures her approaching the menopause.
4. Tyler's daughter has needed a hysterectomy so his line will die with her.
5. Dolly does not die but she is in mortal danger.
6. Miss Fitt fears the loss of her mother.

==== Boys ====
1. Tommy is an orphan
2. Jerry's father has recently been taken away leaving him alone.
3. The gender of the Lynch twins is not specified but their actions, as well as their placement in the text, points to the likelihood that they are males probably based on the twins, Art and Con, that appear in Watt. "The hostility of these children …reinforces the basic image of childlessness both in its presentation of children as alien to the Rooneys and in the way it provokes" Dan's question about thinking about killing a child.

=== Dante ===
Beckett retained lifelong affection for Dante evident by the fact that his student copy of The Divine Comedy would be beside his deathbed in December 1989. References are found throughout all his work but it shouldn’t necessarily be assumed that what he is describing here is an aspect of Hell.

1. Tyler's remark, "I was merely cursing, under my breath, God and man, under my breath, and the wet Saturday afternoon of my conception." is reminiscent of the line from Canto III of the Inferno when Dante describes the cries of the condemned souls with which Charon loads his ferry to cross the Acheron. Dante writes, "They cursed God, their parents, the human race, the place, the time, the seed of their begetting and of their birth."
2. The steep steps to the station recall Mount Purgatory in Dante's Purgatory.
3. Rooney suggests to his wife that they continue their journey walking backwards. He says, "Yes. Or you forwards and I backwards. The perfect pair. Like Dante’s damned, with their faces arsy-versy. Our tears will water our bottoms." Dan is referring to Inferno Canto 20, where the bodies of those who used magic to tell the future are twisted around and face backwards so that their tears run down their backs (lines 23–24) – "il pianto delli occhi/le natiche bagnava per lo fesso".

== Music ==
The music at the beginning of the play not only provides its theme, it also provides its shape.

- "The exposition, Maddy’s slow outward journey, is the 'feminine' (i.e., dominance of a female voice and female themes)."
- "The development, the wait at the railway station, becomes more 'masculine' (Maddy's voice risks being crowded out by male characters who talk among themselves and are often oblivious to Maddy's presence). It is scherzo-like in pace, due to the hustle and bustle on the platform."
- "The final movement or recapitulation is the couple’s return journey, which slows again and sees the submission of the feminine voice to the more brutish male tones of Dan Rooney."
- "This suggested structure of the plot owes more to basic sonata form than to theme and variation. This is the form of the first movement of the Quartet in D minor."

Rosemary Pountey goes so far as to tabulate the themes for both journeys showing the circular structure, even though "the play ends in a linear fashion":

Outward Journey	Inward Journey
1. Footsteps	12. Footsteps
2. Death and the Maiden	11. Dead child – killed by train
3. Hinny	10. Wild laughter
4. Dung	9. Hardy
5. Mrs Rooney's language	8. Death and the Maiden
6. Laburnum	7. Dung
7. Hardy	6. Hinnies
8. Rural Sounds	5. Laburnum
9. Wild laughter	4. Mrs Rooney's language
10. Dead hen – killed by car	3. Rural Sounds
11. Up station steps	2. Down station steps
12. Up mail passes →	1. Down train draws in

A remark made by Professor Harry White about Beckett's later dramatic work gives an idea of the demands made upon the listener in this and his subsequent radio work:

"Like listening to difficult music for the first time."

By comparing Beckett's work to that of serial composers such as Schoenberg and Webern, White highlights the difficulties for listeners who are obliged to actively engage with challenging new form and content. Any meaning or deep structure will only become clear with repeated listening.

== Sound effects ==
Since the journey of the main character is presented psychologically, Beckett asked for natural sounds to be adapted in unnatural ways. "New methods," Martin Esslin writes, "had to be found to extract the various sounds needed (both animal and mechanical – footsteps, cars, bicycle wheels, the train, the cart) from the simple naturalism of the hundreds of records in the BBC’s effects library. Desmond Briscoe [sound technician] (and his gramophone operator, Norman Baines) had to invent ways and means to remove these sounds from the purely realistic sphere. They did so by treating them electronically: slowing down, speeding up, adding echo, fragmenting them by cutting them into segments, and putting them together in new way." Actors produced the sounds of all the animals but "Beckett was actually unimpressed by the use of human voices for the rural sounds when he listened into the … broadcast."

"These experiments, and the discoveries made as they evolved, led directly to the establishment of the BBC Radiophonic Workshop. Beckett and All That Fall thus directly contributed to one of the most important technical advances in the art of radio (and the technique, and indeed technology, of radio in Britain)."

== Reception ==
All That Fall premiered to acclaim from critics.

Jane Shilling praised it in 2016 as a work of "captivating, complex humanity". Michael Billington considers it Beckett’s best play.

== Staged productions ==
Beckett conceived All That Fall as a radio play. To Beckett's mind it was unthinkable to transfer it to another medium and yet it was done, and in his lifetime.

Beckett admonished Barney Rosset, on 27 August 1957, saying of All That Fall: "It is no more theatre than Endgame is radio and to 'act' it is to kill it. Even the reduced visual dimension it will receive from the simplest and most static of readings ... will be destructive of whatever quality it may have and which depends on the whole thing's coming out of the dark." And yet despite this fact "Beckett authorised a French TV version adapted by Robert Pinget, shown on RTF on 25 January 1963. A German stage production was given at the Schiller-Theatre, Berlin in January 1966; Beckett was not happy with either."

"When … Ingmar Bergman asked if he could stage both radio plays, All That Fall and Embers, the answer was a firm 'No'". The same went, in 1969, when Sir Laurence Olivier and his wife visited him to persuade him to allow them to produce a version at the National Theatre. "They had refused to accept his written refusals and made the trip … anyway. There he greeted them with politeness and offered limited hospitality, but remained steadfast in his decision".

In 2006 a production was mounted in New York City at the Cherry Lane Theatre. One critic noted at the time: "[S]ince his death [Beckett’s] Estate has assiduously followed his wishes. Permission is granted only for faithful radio productions or for staged readings in which producers agree to limit the action to actors speaking the lines and walking to and from chairs. The director John Sowle, in his [earlier, 1997] staging of All That Fall … cleverly identified a loophole in the rules: since the play requires many elaborate and self-consciously artificial sound-effects, the production of those effects can become a spectacle in its own right. On stage at the Cherry Lane are a wind machine, gravel-trays, bells, coconuts, a stationary bike and much more. Furthermore, the actors, who read in front of old-fashioned mikes, dressed in 1950s clothes, never acknowledge the audience, even at the curtain call. The conceit is that they're performing a live sound-stage broadcast of the play on which we're eavesdropping."

The Royal Academy of Dramatic Art (RADA) was granted permission to stage 'All That Fall' in the Summer of 2008. It starred Jillian Bradbury and was directed by Bill Gaskill with movement by Toby Sedgwick of War Horse fame. Gaskill wanted to mount the production professionally in London the following year but was refused permission by the Beckett Estate.

Cesear's Forum, Cleveland's small minimalist theatre at Kennedy's Down Under, PlayhouseSquare, OH, presented the play in September 2010. The Plain Dealer theatre critic, Tony Brown, wrote: "Onto the tiny Kennedy's stage, done up to be a multitiered studio, Cesear crowds nine actors, a violinist and a vocalist, a feast of fine local talent playing both the radio actors and the characters they play in the radio play."

Pan Pan, an Irish theatre company, offered the play in August 2011 in the Project Arts Centre, Dublin. A recording of the play was broadcast into the empty theatre space where the audience sat on rocking chairs overlooked by a lighting array on one wall and lowly lit lightbulbs hanging from the ceiling. This production was intended to provide a shared theatrical experience while preserving the wishes of the author.

Trevor Nunn's 2012 stage production retained the concept of a radio studio, but introduced such props as the cab of Mr Slocum's car, thus permitting the visual comedy of the strikingly thin actor Eileen Atkins as she played the stout Mrs Rooney being manoeuvred in and out of the passenger seat for a lift to the station. Michael Gambon, as the blind husband, could be seen to be affected by the ambiguous death of the child. All the actors carried scripts. The Jermyn Street Theatre production was revived at 59E59 Theaters, New York, in 2014.

In 2014 Sandbox Radio staged a production in Seattle in which an audience member viewed a radio production on stage, complete with actors reading scripts and elaborate sound effects.

There was a performance as a Radio Play in Vancouver late 2014 or early 2015. In 2016 Max Stafford Clark directed a version with the audience blindfolded for Out Of Joint Theatre Company which played the Enniskillen Beckett Festival, Bristol Old Vic and Wilton's Music Hall, London.

In March 2019 Dublin's Mouth on Fire Theatre Company also mounted a production where they asked the audience members to put on a blindfold or to close their eyes. This performance was at Tullow Church, Carrickmines/Foxrock, where Beckett worshipped as a child and where the family had a pew as Beckett's mother attended regularly, and only five minutes' walk from Cooldrinagh, the Beckett family home. The President of Ireland and his wife Sabina Higgins attended the performance and invited the company to remount the production at Áras an Uachtaráin on Culture Night in September 2019, as the President's celebrated the fiftieth anniversary of Beckett receiving the Nobel Prize for Literature and the thirtieth anniversary of his death. It starred Geraldine Plunkett and Donncha Crowley and was directed by Cathal Quinn.

In 2022, Melanie Beddie directed a production of the play for La Mama Theatre in Melbourne.
