= Tomkin Road railway station =

Former railway stop in County Cavan, Ireland

Tomkin Road

General information
- Location: Tonkin Road, Drumlane; County Cavan; Ireland
- Platforms: 1

History
- Original company: Cavan and Leitrim Railway
- Pre-grouping: Cavan and Leitrim Railway
- Post-grouping: Great Southern Railways

Key dates
- 24 October 1887: station opened
- 1 April 1959: station closed

Tomkin Road was the first intermediate station on the Cavan and Leitrim Railway in Ireland. The station building is now a private residence and is located in Drumrush townland, parish of Drumlane, County Cavan.

== History ==
The station opened on 24 October 1887 and closed on 1 April 1959.

== Bibliography ==
- Ayres, Bob (2003). "Irish Railway Station Dates" (PDF). Irish Railway Record Society.

Preceding station	Disused railways	Following station
Belturbet	Cavan and Leitrim Railway; Ballinamore-Belturbet	Ballyconnell
