= Crossdoney railway station =

Station in County Cavan, Ireland

Crossdoney

General information
- Location: Crossdoney, County Cavan; Ireland
- Coordinates: 53.9453°N 7.4272°W
- Elevation: 209 ft (64 m)
- Platforms: 2
- Tracks: 2

Construction
- Architect: George Wilkinson

History
- Pre-grouping: MGW, Cavan branch

Key dates
- 1856: Station opened
- 1947: Station closed to passengers
- 1959: last passenger special
- 1960: line closed to all traffic
Location

Crossdoney railway station was a station on the Inny Junction to Cavan branch of the Midland Great Western Railway, Ireland 3/4 mile from the village of Crossdoney County Cavan. It was also the junction for the branch line to Killashandra, the only intermediate station being Arva Road. The line opened in 1856 after the well known architect George Wilkinson designed the station building in the modest Italianate style. The line closed to passenger traffic in 1947 and finally to goods traffic in January 1960. The previous station along the dismantled branch was Drumhawnagh whereas the next station along the branch is Cavan.

Both station house and goods shed (53.946297°N 7.426565°W) survive.

Preceding station	Disused railways	Following station
Drumhawnagh	MGWR; Inny Junction-Cavan	Cavan
Drumhawnagh	MGWR; Killashandra branch	Arva Road
