= Crossdoney =

Village in County Cavan, Ireland

Crossdoney Cros Domhnaigh
- Village
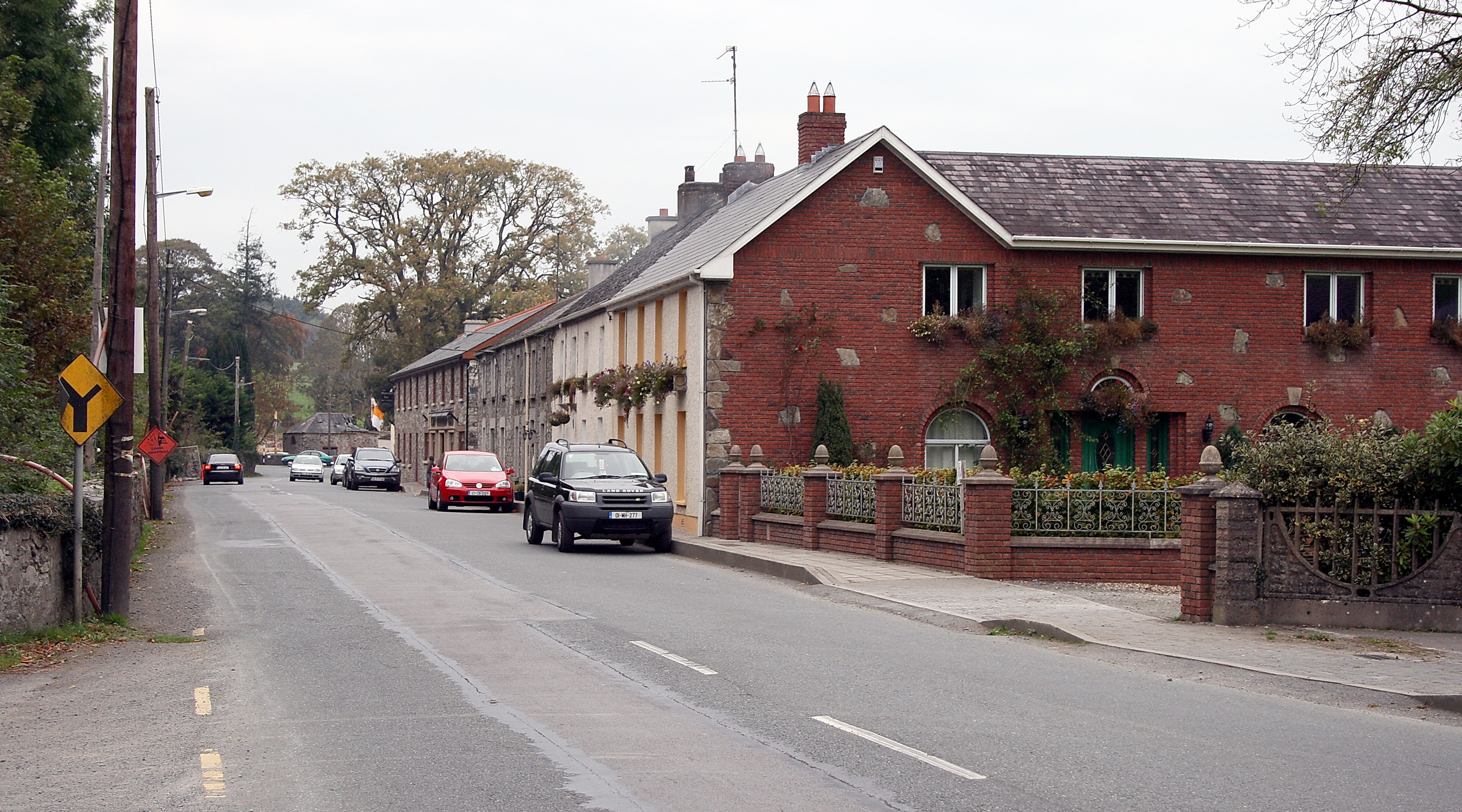
- The village is on the R154 road

- Location in Ireland
- Coordinates: 53.9531°N 7.4345°W
- Country: Ireland
- Province: Ulster
- County: Cavan

Crossdoney (Irish: Cros Domhnaigh, meaning 'cross of the church') is a village and townland in County Cavan, Ireland. The village is on the R154 regional road where it terminates at a junction with the R198. Peculiarly, all buildings in the village sit on one side of the road, and this gives rise to the widely used local expression: "All to one side like Crossdoney".

== History ==
The description of Crossdoney, in Samuel Lewis's Topographical Dictionary of Ireland (published in 1837) states:

CROSSDONEY, a village and post-town, in the parish of KILMORE, barony of CLONMAHON, county of CAVAN, and province of ULSTER, 4 miles (S.W) from Cavan town, and 59¼ (N.W) from Dublin city; the population is returned with the parish. This small neat village, containing only 12 houses, is situated on the road from Killesandra to Cavan, and is surrounded by several gentlemen's seats. Fairs are held on 5 April, 27 May, 26 August and 17 November. Near it is a good bleaching establishment; and at its entrance is Lismore, the seat of Col. Nesbitt, one of the oldest in the county.

== Transport ==
=== Bus ===
Whartons Travel operate bus route 975 on behalf of the National Transport Authority. It serves Crossdoney five times daily in each direction (no Sunday service) providing services to Cavan, Arva, Drumlish and Longford, terminating at Longford railway station.

=== Rail ===
Crossdoney railway station was a stop on the MGWR line between Cavan town and Inny Junction. The line opened first in July 1856, with a branch opened to Killeshandra in 1886. The entire route closed to passengers in 1947, finally closing for goods in January 1960. The Crossdoney station house is now a private residence.

== See also ==
- List of towns and villages in Ireland
