= Armoy railway station =

Railway station in Northern Ireland

Armoy Oirthear Maí

General information
- Location: Armoy, County Antrim; Northern Ireland; UK
- Coordinates: 55.1335°N 6.3346°W

History
- Original company: Ballycastle Railway

Key dates
- 18 October 1880: Station opened by Ballycastle Railway
- 24 March 1924: Station closed by Ballycastle Railway
- 11 August 1924: Station reopened by LMS(NCC)
- 3 July 1950: Station closed by Ulster Transport Authority

Services
Preceding station	Disused railways	Following station
Gracehill	Great Northern Railway (Ireland); Ballycastle Railway	Capecastle
Location

Armoy was a station which served Armoy in County Antrim, Northern Ireland. It was located on the Ballycastle Railway, a narrow gauge railway line which ran from Ballycastle to Ballymoney, entirely in County Antrim, Northern Ireland. The track gauge was 3 ft (914 mm).

== History ==
The station was opened by the Ballycastle Railway. Following absorption of the BR into the LMS (NCC), the station then passed to the Ulster Transport Authority under whose management it was closed in July 1950.
