= Ballycastle railway station =

Former station in Northern Ireland

Coordinates: 55.201°N 6.2482°W

Ballycastle
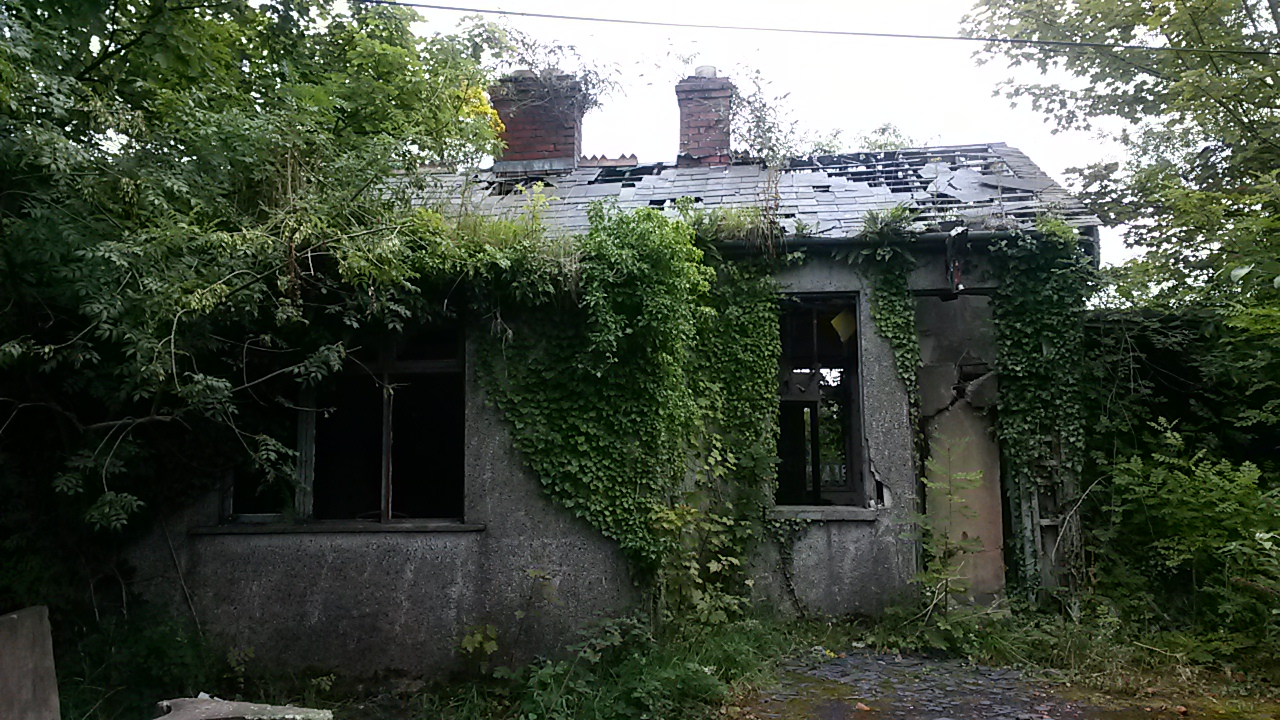
- The derelict state of Ballyclare station

General information
- Location: County Antrim; Northern Ireland

Other information
- Status: Disused

History
- Original company: Ballycastle Railway
- Pre-grouping: Ballycastle Railway
- Post-grouping: Ballycastle Railway

Key dates
- 18 October 1880: Station opens
- 3 July 1950: Station closes
Location

Ballycastle railway station was on the Ballycastle Railway which ran from Ballymoney to Ballycastle in Northern Ireland.

== History ==
The station was opened by the Ballycastle Railway on 18 October 1880. It was taken over by the Northern Counties Committee on 4 May 1924.

Under the terms of the Transport Act 1947 the London, Midland and Scottish Railway, the Northern Counties Committee parent company, was nationalised by the British Government on 1 January 1948. The Northern Counties Committee (and the Ballycastle Railway) was thus briefly owned by the British Transport Commission. This was only a temporary measure and in 1949 the NCC was transferred to the Ulster Transport Authority (UTA) – owned by the Government of Northern Ireland.

The station closed to passengers on 3 July 1950. As at 2018 the station site was being used as a bus depot.

| Preceding station | Historical railways | Following station |
|---|---|---|
| Capecastle | Ballycastle Railway; Ballymoney-Ballycastle | Terminus |
