= Antrim railway station (Great Northern Railway) =

Former railway station Northern Ireland

Coordinates: 54.718°N 6.212°W

Antrim GN (I)
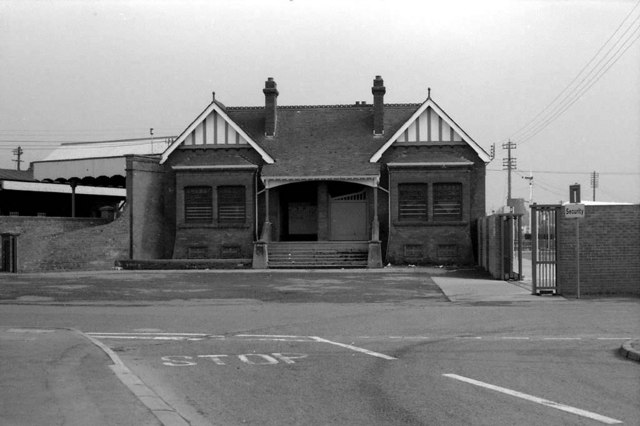

General information
- Location: Station Rd., Antrim, County Antrim; Northern Ireland

Other information
- Status: Disused

History
- Pre-grouping: Great Northern Railway (Ireland)

Key dates
- 13 November 1871: Station opened
- 12 September 1960: Station closed
Location

Antrim railway station (Great Northern) served Antrim in County Antrim, Northern Ireland. It was located on the mothballed Lisburn–Antrim railway line. The town is now served by Antrim railway station.

== History ==
Built by the Dublin and Antrim Junction Railway, it became part of the Great Northern Railway. In 1958, it passed to the Ulster Transport Authority. The UTA closed the station two years later.

== Today ==
Currently, the line between Antrim and Lisburn railway stations is only used for training and emergency diversions, however it could be revived under plans to operate a Belfast–Lisburn–Antrim–Belfast circular route. Any traffic would use the current Antrim station.

Preceding station	Disused railways	Following station
Millars Bridge	Great Northern Railway (Ireland); Lisburn-Antrim	Antrim Junction
