= Baldoyle railway station =

Station in Dublin, Ireland

Baldoyle

General information
- Location: Grange Rd. Baldoyle, County Dublin; Ireland
- Coordinates: 53.3976°N 6.1505°W
- Platforms: 1

History
- Original company: Dublin and Drogheda Railway

Key dates
- 1844: Opened
- 1848: Closed for regular passenger traffic
- 1852: Closed for race specials

Services
Preceding station	Disused railways	Following station
Howth Junct.	Dublin and Drogheda Railway	Portmarnock
Location

Baldoyle railway station was a railway station in Dublin, Ireland, serving nearby Baldoyle. It was located, on the down side, between Howth Junction and Portmarnock. It was short-lived, opening in 1844, finally closing in 1852.

The later Clongriffin is now past the site of this former station towards Portmarnock.

== History ==
Opened in 1844, it was one of the stations of the original Dublin-Drogheda line. The station closed to regular traffic in 1848 with the opening of Howth Junction. However, it remained in use for Baldoyle race specials until 1852.
