= Annaloughan Halt =

Railway halt in Ireland

General information
- Location: Ireland
- Coordinates: 54.0034°N 6.2754°W

History
- Original company: Dundalk, Newry and Greenore Railway
- Pre-grouping: London and North Western Railway
- Post-grouping: London Midland and Scottish Railway

Key dates
- 1935: Halt opened
- 1951: Halt closed

Services
Preceding station	Disused railways	Following station
Bellurgen	Dundalk, Newry and Greenore Railway	Gyles Quay
Location

Annaloughlan Halt was a railway halt which served Annaloughan in County Louth, Ireland.

== History ==
The halt was on the Dundalk, Newry and Greenore Railway line. From 1873 to 1951 the line served the ferry service between Greenore and Holyhead. The London and North Western Railway constructed a substantial hotel and railway station at Greenore to serve passengers using the ferry.

Transferred to the London, Midland and Scottish Railway during the Grouping of 1923, the station then passed on to the Ulster Transport Authority. The station closed in 1951.
