= Attanagh railway station =

Railway station in Ireland

Attanagh

General information
- Location: Attanagh, County Laois; Ireland
- Coordinates: 52.833°N 7.352°W
- Elevation: 281 ft (86 m)
- Tracks: 1

Construction
- Platform levels: 1

History
- Original company: Kilkenny Junction Railway
- Pre-grouping: Great Southern and Western Railway
- Post-grouping: Great Southern Railways

Key dates
- 1 March 1865: Station opens
- 1 September 1866: Station closes
- 1 May 1867: Station reopens
- 1 January 1963: Station closes

Services
Preceding station	Disused railways	Following station
Abbeyleix	Great Southern and Western Railway; Dublin-Kilkenny/Waterford	Ballyragget
Location

Attanagh railway station served the village of Attanagh in County Laois, Ireland.

The station opened on 1 March 1865. Passenger services were withdrawn on 1 January 1963 by CIÉ.

== History ==
Opened by the Kilkenny Junction Railway, by the beginning of the 20th century the station was run by the Great Southern and Western Railway. It was absorbed into the Great Southern Railways in 1925.

The station was then nationalised, passing on to Córas Iompair Éireann as a result of the Transport Act 1944 which took effect from 1 January 1945. It was closed in 1963.
