= Abbeyleix railway station =

Former railway station in Ireland

Abbeyleix Mainistir Laoise
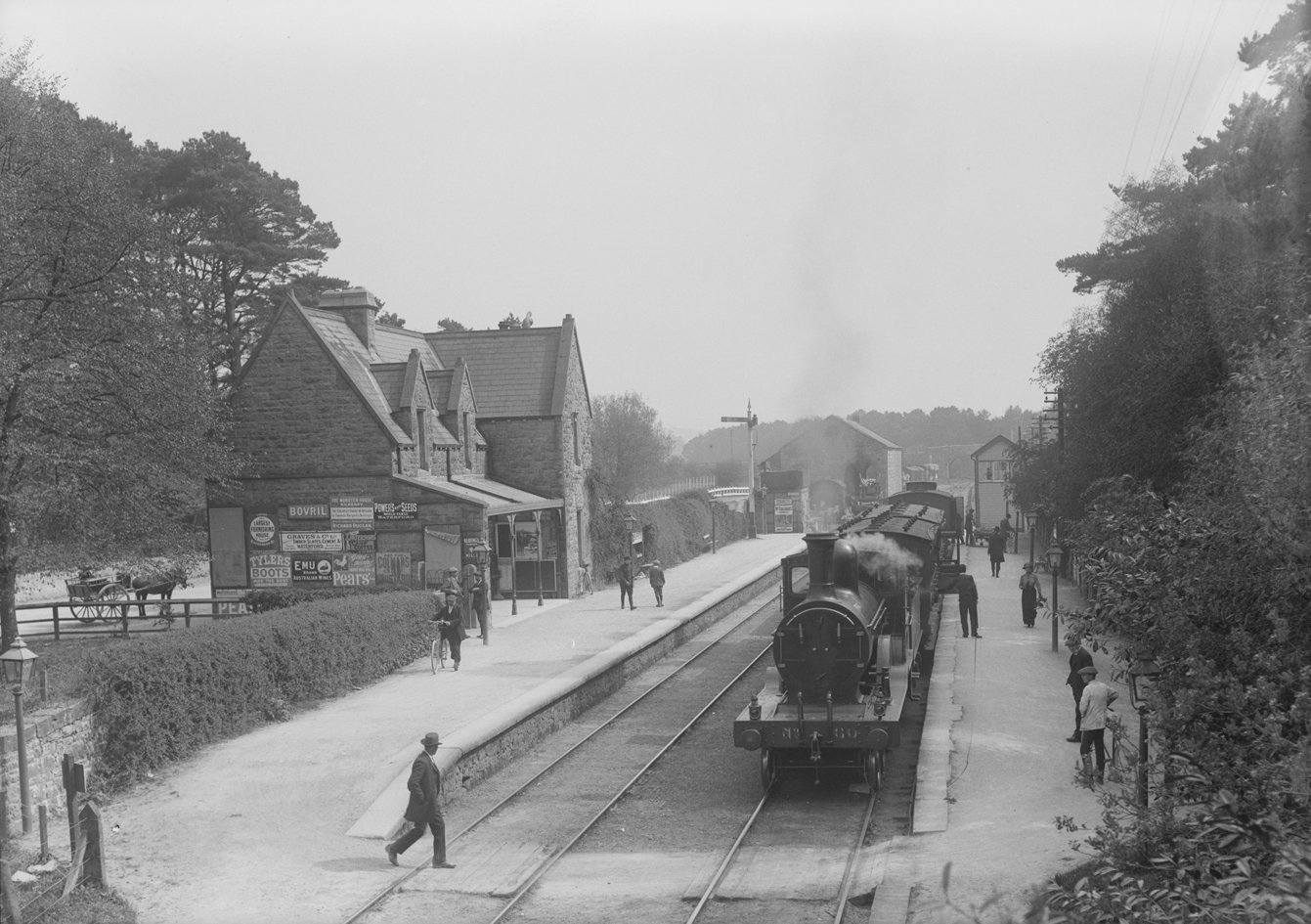
- Train at Abbeyleix station, 1910

General information
- Location: Ballacolla Rd. Abbeyleix, County Laois; Ireland
- Coordinates: 52.908592°N 7.356170°W
- Elevation: 323 ft (98 m)
- Platforms: 2
- Tracks: 2

History
- Opened: 1865
- Closed: 1963
- Original company: Kilkenny Junction Railway
- Pre-grouping: Great Southern and Western Railway
- Post-grouping: Great Southern Railways

Key dates
- 1 March 1865: Station opens
- 1 September 1866: Station closes
- 1 May 1867: Station reopens
- 1 January 1963: Station closes
Location

Abbeyleix railway station served the town of Abbeyleix in County Laois, Ireland.

The station opened on 1 March 1865. Passenger services were withdrawn on 1 January 1963 by CIÉ.

== History ==
Opened by the Kilkenny Junction Railway, by the beginning of the 20th century the station was run by the Great Southern and Western Railway. It was absorbed into the Great Southern Railways in 1925.

The station was then nationalised, passing on to Córas Iompair Éireann as a result of the Transport Act, 1944 which took effect from 1 January 1945. It was closed in 1963.

The clock which was in the waiting room at the station and a working scale model of the station can be seen at Heritage House, Abbeyleix.

Preceding station	Disused railways	Following station
Maryborough	Great Southern and Western Railway; Dublin-Kilkenny/Waterford	Attanagh
