= Ardbraccan Halt railway station =

Former railway halt in Ireland

Ardbraccan Crossing

General information
- Location: Navan, County Meath; Ireland
- Coordinates: 53.6711°N 6.7463°W
- Platforms: No
- Tracks: Single

Construction
- Structure type: Level crossing

History
- Opened: 1937
- Closed: 1942
- Original company: Great Northern Railway (Ireland)

Services
Preceding station	Disused railways	Following station
Newgate Crossing	Great Northern Railway (Ireland); Drogheda-Oldcastle line	Castlemartin
Location

Ardbraccan Crossing was an accommodation crossing near Ardbraccan in County Meath, Ireland. It was located at milepost 20, three miles west of Navan on the Oldcastle branch. It was used by the Great Northern Railway of Ireland as a halt between 1937 and 1942.
