= Abohill railway station =

Railway station in Northern Ireland

Abohill

General information
- Location: Abohill, County Fermanagh, Northern Ireland; UK
- Coordinates: 54.291°N 7.783°W

History
- Opened: June 1886
- Closed: 1 October 1957
- Original company: Sligo, Leitrim and Northern Counties Railway
- Post-grouping: Sligo, Leitrim and Northern Counties Railway
Location

Abohill railway station served Abohill in County Fermanagh, Northern Ireland.

The station opened in June 1886. Passenger services were withdrawn on 1 October 1957.

== History ==
The station was on the Sligo, Leitrim and Northern Counties Railway, one of the railways not to be absorbed into the state-owned system in 1925 since it crossed the border between Northern Ireland and the Republic (then the Irish Free State). The Railway was a pioneer in the use of railbuses. The line closed on 1 October 1957 as a direct result of the Government of Northern Ireland ordering closure of the railway line through Enniskillen.

Preceding station	Disused railways	Following station
Florence Court	Sligo, Leitrim and Northern Counties Railway	Belcoo
