= Cavan and Leitrim Railway =

Defunct narrow-gauge railway in northwest Ireland

Cavan and Letrim Railway
- Lines owned by CLR; Arigna Valley Railway (state-owned but worked by CLR)

Overview
- Dates of operation: 1887–1959

Technical
- Track gauge: 3 ft (914 mm)
- Length: 52 miles 76 chains (85.2 km) (1922)
- Track length: 57 miles 61 chains (93.0 km) (1922)

The Cavan and Leitrim Railway (CLR) was a 3 ft (914 mm) narrow-gauge railway that operated in the south of County Leitrim and the north-west of County Cavan on the northern edge of the Midlands in Ireland; it ran from 1887 until 1959. Unusually for Ireland, this 3 ft (914 mm) narrow gauge line survived on coal traffic, from the mine at Arigna, although the original main line was constructed principally for traffic in cattle. It outlived most of the other Irish narrow-gauge lines, giving a further lease of life to some of their redundant engines.

== Development ==
The line had the support of Henry King-Tenison, 8th Earl of Kingston of Kilronan Castle, Ballyfarnon, who wanted to bring prosperity to this part of Ireland. In September 1883, a public meeting in Ballinamore declared that a light railway and tramway would open up the coal and iron districts of Arigna and Lough Allen. The Cavan, Leitrim & Roscommon Light Railway & Tramway Company was set up with a guaranteed capital of £202,000 in 40,400 shares of £5 each. Chairman of the board was The Rt. Hon. The Earl of Kingston, D.L., Kilronan Castle.

== Route ==
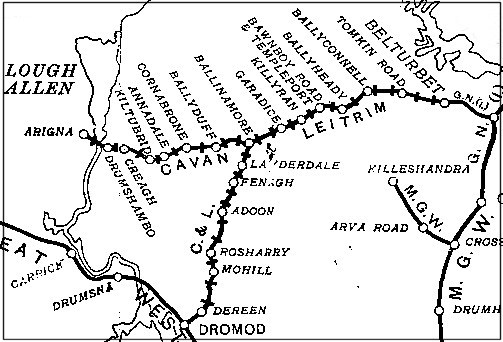
The Cavan & Leitrim Railway in 1906

The 54 km (34 mi) main line was built between Dromod and Belturbet with a 24 km (15 mi) branch from Ballinamore to Arigna.

The Belturbet to Dromod part of the Cavan and Leitrim Railway ran from Belturbet through Tomkin Road, Ballyconnell, Bellaheady, Bawnboy Road, Killyran, Garadice, Ballinamore, Lawderdale, Fenagh, Adoon, Rosharry, Mohill and Dereen to Dromod.

The Belturbet to Arigna part of the line ran from Belturbet to Ballinamore and from there through Ballyduff, Cornabrone, Annadale, Kiltubrid, Creagh and Drumshanbo to Arigna.

== Later years ==
In 1925, the company was amalgamated into the Great Southern Railways. All lines were closed in 1959.

== Locomotives ==
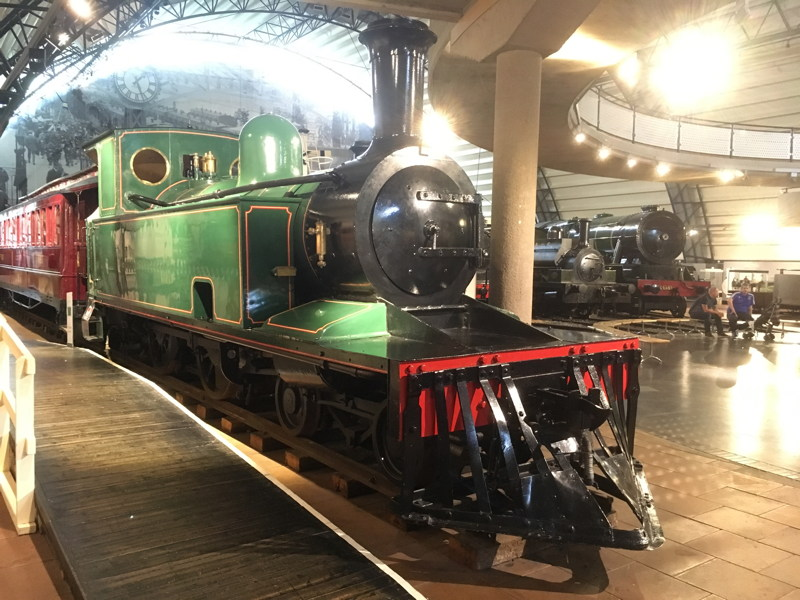
Preserved C&LR 4-4-0T 2 "Kathleen" at Cultra

When the line opened, there were eight 4-4-0T locomotives, numbered 1 to 8, supplied by Robert Stephenson and Company. A ninth locomotive, No. 9, an 0-6-4T came from the same supplier in 1904. CLR numbers 2, 3, 4 and 8 were renumbered by adding an L suffix after the railway became part of the GSR. In 1933, after the closure of the Cork, Blackrock and Passage Railway, the GSR transferred its four Neilson Reid 2-4-2T locomotives to the C&L line, renumbering them 10L to 13L. Four locomotives from the Tralee and Dingle Light Railway were transferred, after the end of passenger services in 1939 and freight in 1953, to the C&L between 1941 and 1958 numbered 3T to 6T. Locomotive 3T was a Hunslet Engine Company 2-6-0T of 1889, 4T was a Kerr Stuart 2-6-0T of 1903, 5T was a 2-6-2T built by Hunslet in 1892, and 6T was the same type as 3T but built in 1898.

== Preservation ==
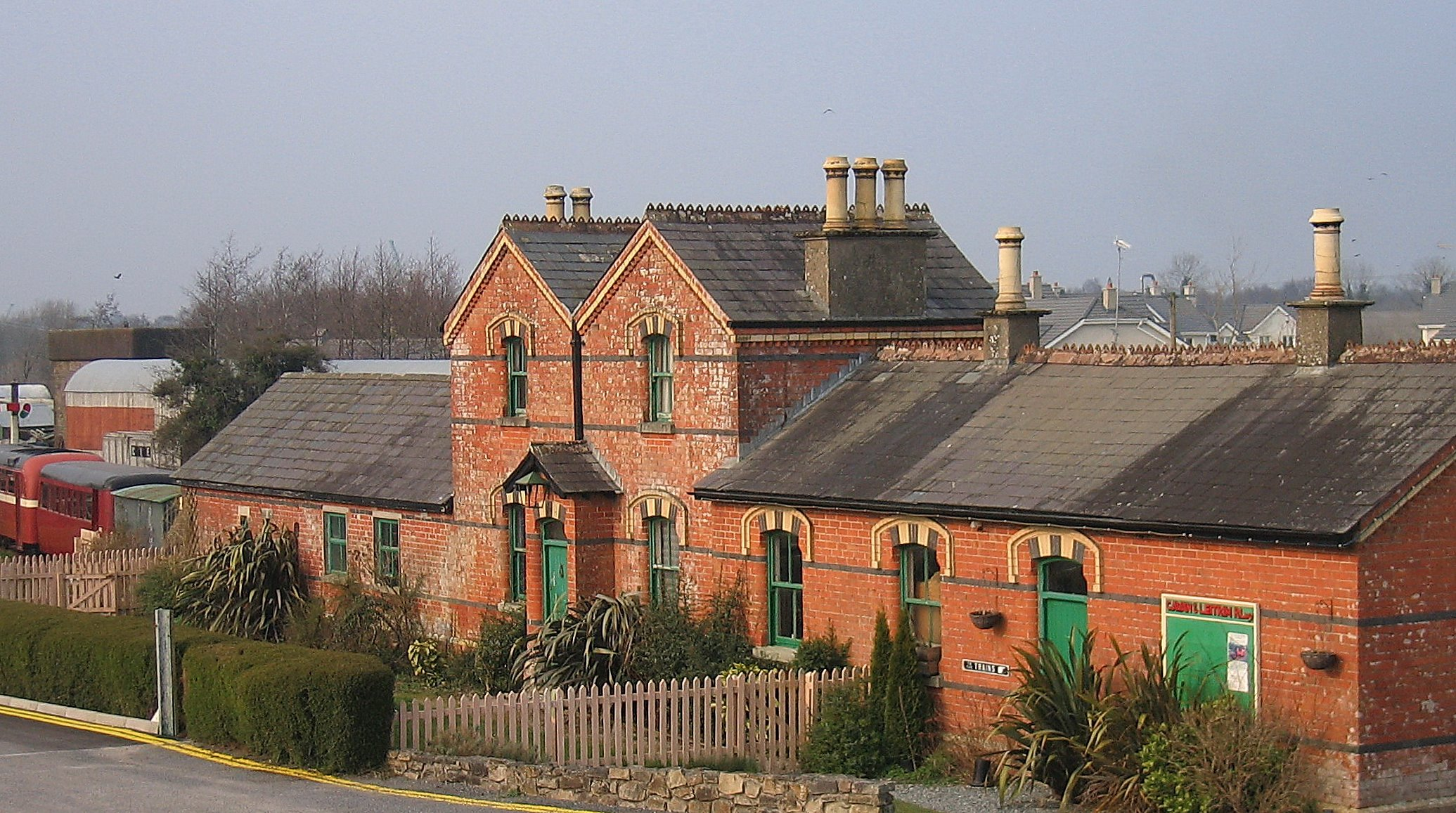
C & L Railway Station, Dromod

The privately owned Cavan & Leitrim Railway is based in the former Dromod Station, in Co. Leitrim. There is a transport museum, with narrow-gauge trains of several gauges, buses, planes, fire engines and artillery guns from World War I and World War II. It was originally intended to rebuild the line to Mohill but this is now most unlikely to happen. With the help of volunteers, trains are running on a short section of the line. The Avonside 0-6-0T steam locomotive "Nancy" was rebuilt at Alan Keef in Wales where it first steamed on 23 March 2019 after twenty years of restoration work. The locomotive was shipped to Dromod, where it now resides. The line's first steam locomotive since preservation is 'Dromod' a Kerr Stuart Brazil class 0-4-2T, which as of May 2021 was out of service awaiting its ten-year overhaul. Despite being too small an organisation to qualify for grant aid in Ireland the railway has managed to continue maintenance tasks in this period with the railway saying two-thirds of its track has been relaid to a high standard and progress continuing on capital projects.

One of the original locomotives, No. 2, and one of the original carriages, is preserved on display at the Ulster Folk and Transport Museum. Locomotive No. 3 'Lady Edith' was exported to New Jersey, United States and is today displayed in the New Jersey Museum of Transportation. The chassis of a carriage formerly used by the railway is preserved at the Stradbally Woodland Railway.

== See also ==
- List of heritage railways in the Republic of Ireland
