= Inny Junction railway station =

Railway station in Ireland

Inny Junction Cavan or Derradd Junction

General information
- Location: Derradd, County Westmeath; Ireland
- Coordinates: 53.660221°N 7.448053°W
- Elevation: 217 ft (66 m)
- Platforms: 3

History
- Pre-grouping: Midland Great Western Railway

Key dates
- 1869: Station opened
- 1931: Station closed to passengers
- 1941: Station closed to staff
Location

Inny Junction was a former station on the Dublin-Sligo railway line. It opened in 1869 and closed in 1941. For the last decade it solely served as a staff halt. The MGWR branch to Cavan, which closed in 1960, diverged here. The station was located in a very isolated rural location.

Preceding station	Disused railways	Following station
Multyfarnham	Midland Great Western Railway; Mullingar-Cavan	Float
