= Cavan railway station =

Train station

Cavan

General information
- Location: Cavan, County Cavan; Ireland
- Platforms: 3

History
- Pre-grouping: Midland Great Western Railway and the Great Northern Railway of Ireland

Key dates
- 1856: station opened (line from Inny Jct.)
- 1862: GNR line from Clones opened
- 1947: Station closed to MGWR passengers
- 1957: Station closed to GNR passengers
- 1959: last passenger special
- 1960: line closed to all traffic
- 1961: line lifted
Location

Cavan railway station in Swellan in Cavan Town was a former station on the Inny Junction to Cavan branch of the Midland Great Western Railway, Ireland.

== History ==
The Clones and Cavan Extension Railway was an extension of the Ulster Railway from Clones in County Monaghan to Cavan opened in 1862. The station in Cavan was opened firstly by the Midland Great Western Railway with trains to Dublin Broadstone. However the Ulster Railway also sought to link Cavan with Belfast Great Victoria Street.

After the railway line closed in 1960, the station was later refurbished as an office building. From 2000 to 2018, it housed the offices of The Anglo-Celt Newspaper.

In 2023, under the All-Island Strategic Railway Review, the station was recommended for reopening as part of a line from Mullingar to Portadown.

== Services ==
Preceding station	Disused railways	Following station
Crossdoney	Midland Great Western Railway; Inny Junction-Cavan	terminus
terminus	Great Northern Railway; Clones-Cavan	Loreto College Halt
	Proposed Services	
Mullingar	All-Island Strategic Rail Review; Mullingar-Portadown Line	Clones
