= Navan (disambiguation) =

Navan is a town in County Meath, Ireland.

Navan may also refer to:

== Places ==
- Navan Fort, an ancient hillfort or roundhouse in County Armagh, Northern Ireland
- Navan, Gilan, north-west Iran, a village
- Navan, Ontario, Canada, a rural community
- Navan District, Oyón, Peru
- Navan (Parliament of Ireland constituency), based on the Irish town

== Railway stations in the Irish town ==
- Navan railway station
- Navan Junction railway station
- Navan Central railway station
- Navan North railway station

== Sport ==
- Navan Gaels GAA, in the Irish town, a defunct club, mostly played Gaelic football
- Navan Hibernians GAC, in the Irish town, a defunct hurling club
- Navan O'Mahonys GAA, in the Irish town, active Gaelic games club
- Navan R.F.C., in the Irish town, rugby club
- Navan Racecourse, near the Irish town
- Navan Grads, Ontario, Canada, an ice hockey team

== Other uses ==
- Navan (potato cultivar), a potato variety
- Navan liqueur, a vanilla liqueur
- Navan Group, geologic formation in Ireland
- Navan, Inc., an American travel and expense company

== See also ==
- Baron of Navan, in the peerage of Ireland
