= Irish Street Halt railway station =

Railway station in Northern Ireland

Irish Street Halt
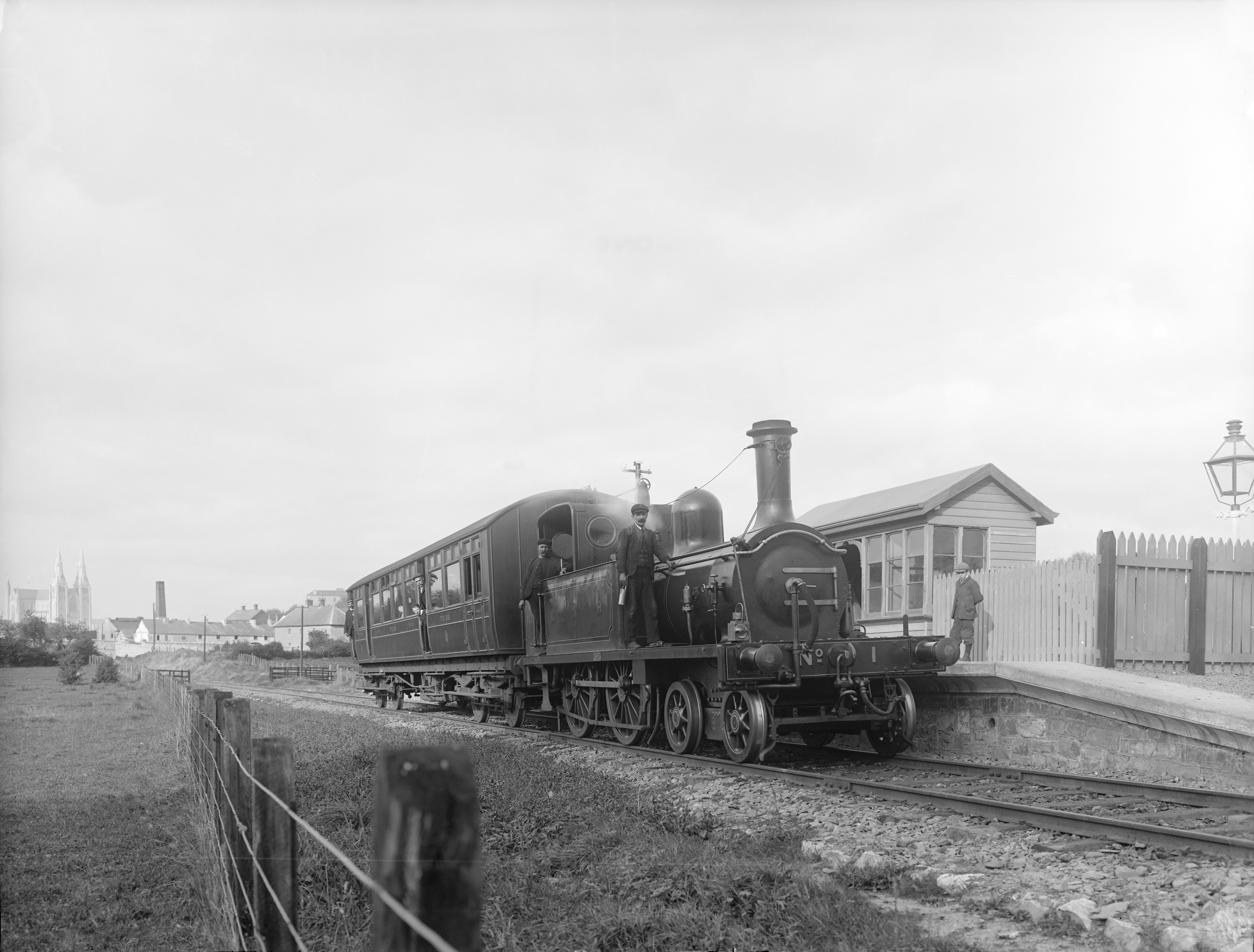
- GNRI Class BT 4-4-0T at Irish Street in 1909

General information
- Location: Armagh, County Armagh; Northern Ireland; UK
- Coordinates: 54.34375°N 6.6611°W
- Elevation: 132 ft (40 m)

History
- Original company: Castleblayney, Keady and Armagh Railway
- Post-grouping: Great Northern Railway (Ireland)

Key dates
- 1 January 1913: Station opens
- 1 February 1932: Station closes
Location

Irish Street Halt railway station was a suburban halt, one mile south of Armagh station, on the Castleblayney, Keady and Armagh Railway in Northern Ireland.

It operated between 1 January 1913 and 1 February 1932.

== Routes ==
Preceding station	Disused railways	Following station
Armagh	Castleblayney, Keady and Armagh Railway; Armagh to Castleblayney	Milford (CKAR)
