= Navan railway station =

Railway station in Navan, Ireland

Navan
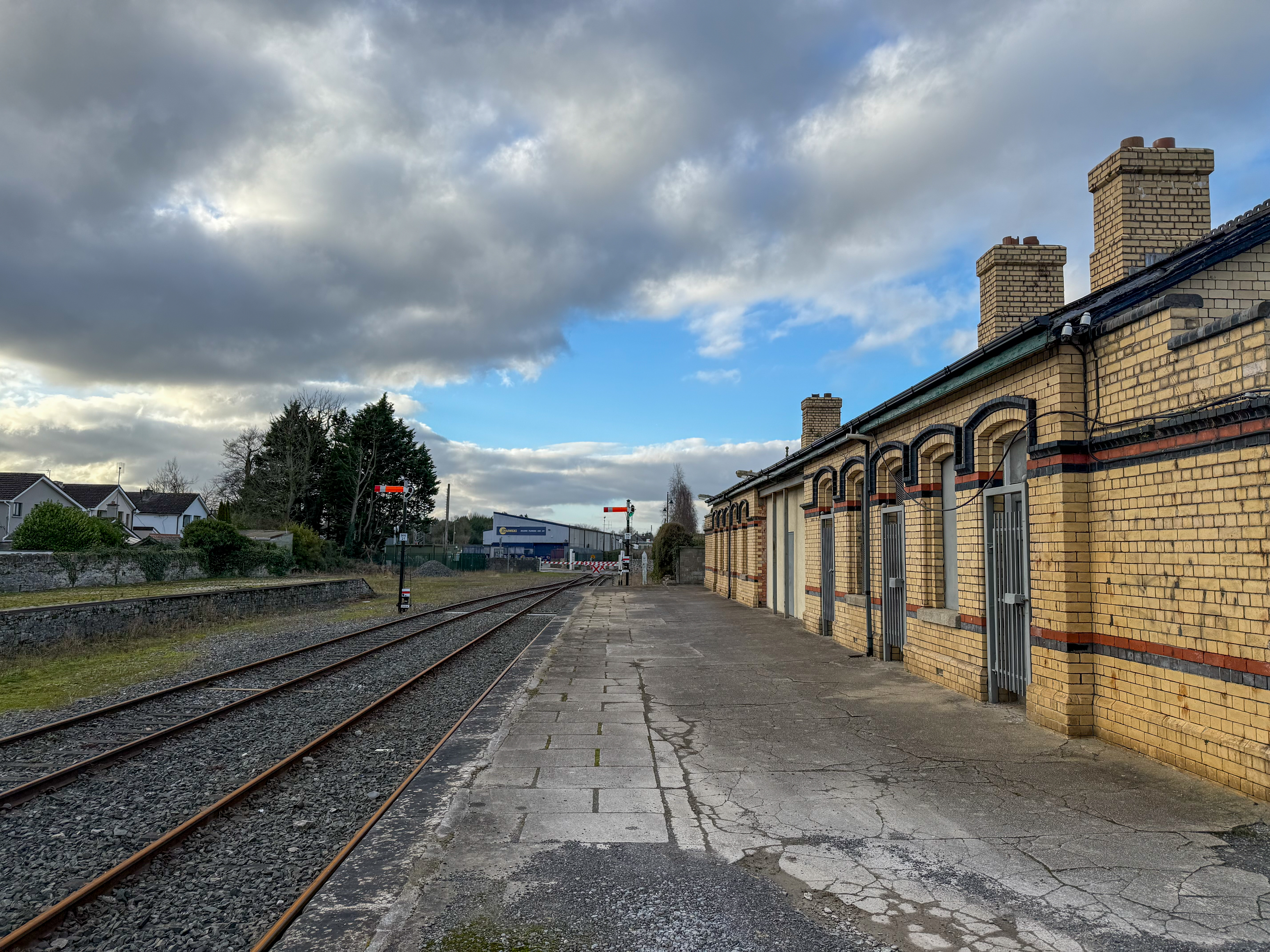
- Navan (GNR) station in 2025

General information
- Location: Railway Street; Navan, County Meath; Ireland
- Coordinates: 53.6488°N 6.6846°W

History
- Original company: Dublin and Drogheda Railway
- Post-grouping: Great Northern Railway

Key dates
- 15 February 1850: Station opens
- 14 April 1958: Station closes to passengers
- 7 March 1977: Station closes to goods
Location

Navan railway station is a former train station which served the town of Navan in County Meath, Ireland.

== History ==
The station served the centre of the town, and was on the branch line between Drogheda and Oldcastle, which was opened by the Dublin and Drogheda Railway in 1850 and became part of the Great Northern Railway in 1876. The station was one of two serving the town, the other being Navan Junction, which served as the main station and was on the junction of the Clonsilla-Kingscourt and Drogheda-Oldcastle branch lines. Navan station was much smaller, with a single bi-directional platform serving the single track.

Navan station, along with the branch line, was closed in on 14 April 1958 to passenger services when the Oldcastle line lost its passenger traffic. The station was still open for goods until 7 March 1977, however, the station remains relatively intact, with several freight trains per day still serving the station to and from the Tara Mine.

== Proposals ==
In 2007 the campaign group Rail Users Ireland called for the restoration of passenger services on the Oldcastle line - as a commuter service between Navan and Dublin. This was because the planned passenger Dublin-Navan railway line from Clonsilla, which is expected to use the Midland Great Western Railway alignment, will not reach Navan until undetermined future time. Rail Users Ireland's proposal was for Navan station to be reopened and two new stations (Navan East and Duleek) to be built, allowing a commuter service of 65 minutes into Dublin.

In 2024, the line was again proposed for reopening by the Commuter North Rail Users Group, who suggested it could be renamed the "Boyne Valley Railway" and provide a train service to Navan and tie in to the DART+ scheme, as the direct line to Dublin is not expected to open until at least 2036.

In May 2026, Iarnród Éireann published the emerging preferred route for the extension of the Dublin-Navan railway which would see a new Navan Central station constructed about 300m to the west of the existing station, and a new terminus, Navan North, constructed to the north of the town in the Nevinstown area. At the time it was projected that planning applications for these proposals could be lodged in 2028.

== Rail replacement bus ==
A rail replacement bus was introduced in 1958 and this route continued until 2013 as Bus Éireann route 188 (Navan-Slane-Duleek-Drogheda with a latter extension to Trim). Until the 1980s/early 1990s the bus also served Drogheda railway station and until the 1990s or early 2000s the bus to Drogheda commenced and could be boarded at Navan railway station. Route 109X of Bus Éireann serves Cavan-Navan-Dublin.

== Routes ==
Preceding station	Disused railways	Following station
Beaupark	Great Northern Railway; Oldcastle branch line	Navan Junction
