= Duleek railway station =

Railway station in Ireland

Coordinates: 53.6701°N 6.4199°W

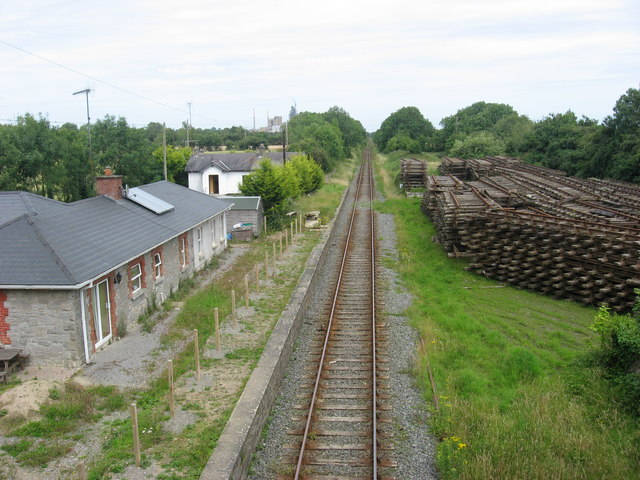
- Duleek station

General information
- Location: Ireland
- Operated by: GNR(I)
- Line: Drogheda-Oldcastle branch line
- Connections: Bus Éireann route 190 (rail replacement)

Other information
- Status: Closed (proposed to reopen)

History
- Opened: 1850
- Closed: 1958
- Previous names: Great Northern Railway (Ireland)
Location

Duleek railway station is a former railway station that served the town of Duleek in County Meath. Located on the Drogheda-Oldcastle branch line and operated by the GNR(I), the station opened in 1850 and closed to passenger services, along with the rest of the line, in 1958.

The pressure group Rail Users Ireland have proposed that, as part of their plan to institute a rail service between Dublin and Navan using the Oldcastle branch that is in situ, Duleek station be rebuilt and reopened as a park and ride. Rail Users Ireland claims that this would form part of a €54 million upgrade of the route for passenger services as an alternative to Iarnród Éireann's two stage proposal to reopen the route from Clonsilla.

== Rail replacement bus ==
A rail replacement bus was introduced in 1958 and this route continues to this day as Bus Éireann route number 190 (Drogheda-Duleek-Slane-Navan with a latter extension to either Trim or Athboy). This was formally route 188. Until the 1980s/early 1990s the bus also served Drogheda railway station.

Preceding station	Disused railways	Following station
Drogheda	Great Northern Railway (Ireland); Drogheda-Oldcastle	Lougher
