= Milford railway station (Northern Ireland) =

Railway station in Northern Ireland

Former Milford Railway Station
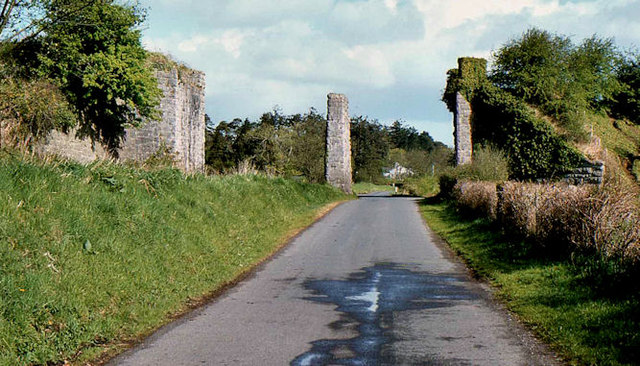
- Former viaduct for Milford railway

General information
- Location: Milford, County Armagh, County Armagh; Northern Ireland; Northern Ireland
- Coordinates: 54°19′42″N 6°40′43″W
- Lines: Castleblayney, Keady and Armagh
- Distance: 45 miles
- Connections: Irish Street halt→Milford station→Ballyards Halt

Construction
- Architect: Sir Benjamin Baker (Chief engineer)

History
- Original company: Castleblayney, Keady and Armagh Railway
- Post-grouping: Great Northern Railway (Ireland)

Key dates
- 31 May 1909: Station opens
- 1 Feb 1932: Station closes
Location
- Location within Northern Ireland Location within island of Ireland

Milford railway station was on the Castleblayney, Keady and Armagh Railway in Northern Ireland. The Castleblayney, Keady and Armagh Railway opened the station on 31 May 1909.

The station featured a single platform located on the Down side, with a passing loop on the Up side. At the Armagh end of the station, a facing siding served a nearby mill. The linen mill ceased operations in 1980, was demolished in 1996, and the site was subsequently redeveloped for residential use. The platform measured 349 feet in length, making it the longest on the Great Northern Railway (G.N.R.) line. No physical remnants of the station or its associated infrastructure remain today.

== Milford Cutting ==
Adjacent to the former station site is Milford Cutting, a disused railway cutting that has become a notable local nature reserve. The cutting occupies the route of the former Milford railway line. This extension was funded by Robert Garmany McCrum, who contributed £3,000 to bring the line to Milford. The extension opened in 1909 as part of the Armagh City to Castleblayney branch of the Great Northern Railway and remained in operation until its closure.

== Construction and operation ==
Robert Worthington, often referred to as the "Dargan of the 1880s," was awarded the contract for the construction of the Castleblayney, Keady and Armagh Railway (CK&A) and commenced work in 1903. The project began with optimism under the supervision of the CK&A’s engineer, Sir Benjamin Baker. However, progress soon slowed, and shareholder reports described the work as making only "steady" or "fair" progress.

The railway's route included a summit reaching 613 feet above sea level, likely the highest point attained by a standard gauge line in Ireland. The terrain posed significant engineering challenges, including stretches of peat bog and rock cuttings. On the northern slope toward Armagh, three major stone viaducts were constructed at Milford, Tassagh (with 11 arches), and Keady (with 7 arches).

Worthington operated with a maximum of seven engines, but delays led the CK&A company to take control of his equipment and works in May 1908, including two engines named Molly and Kells. The company completed the construction independently. The eight-mile section from Armagh to Keady opened on 31 May 1909. Shortly thereafter, Molly suffered a boiler explosion near Keady. The remaining 10¼-mile stretch from Keady to Castleblayney was opened on 10 November 1910.

In 1911, the CK&A lost its nominal independence when it was absorbed by its parent company the Great Northern Railway (Ireland).

== Routes ==
Preceding station	Disused railways	Following station
Irish Street Halt	Castleblayney, Keady and Armagh Railway; Armagh to Castleblayney	Ballyards Halt

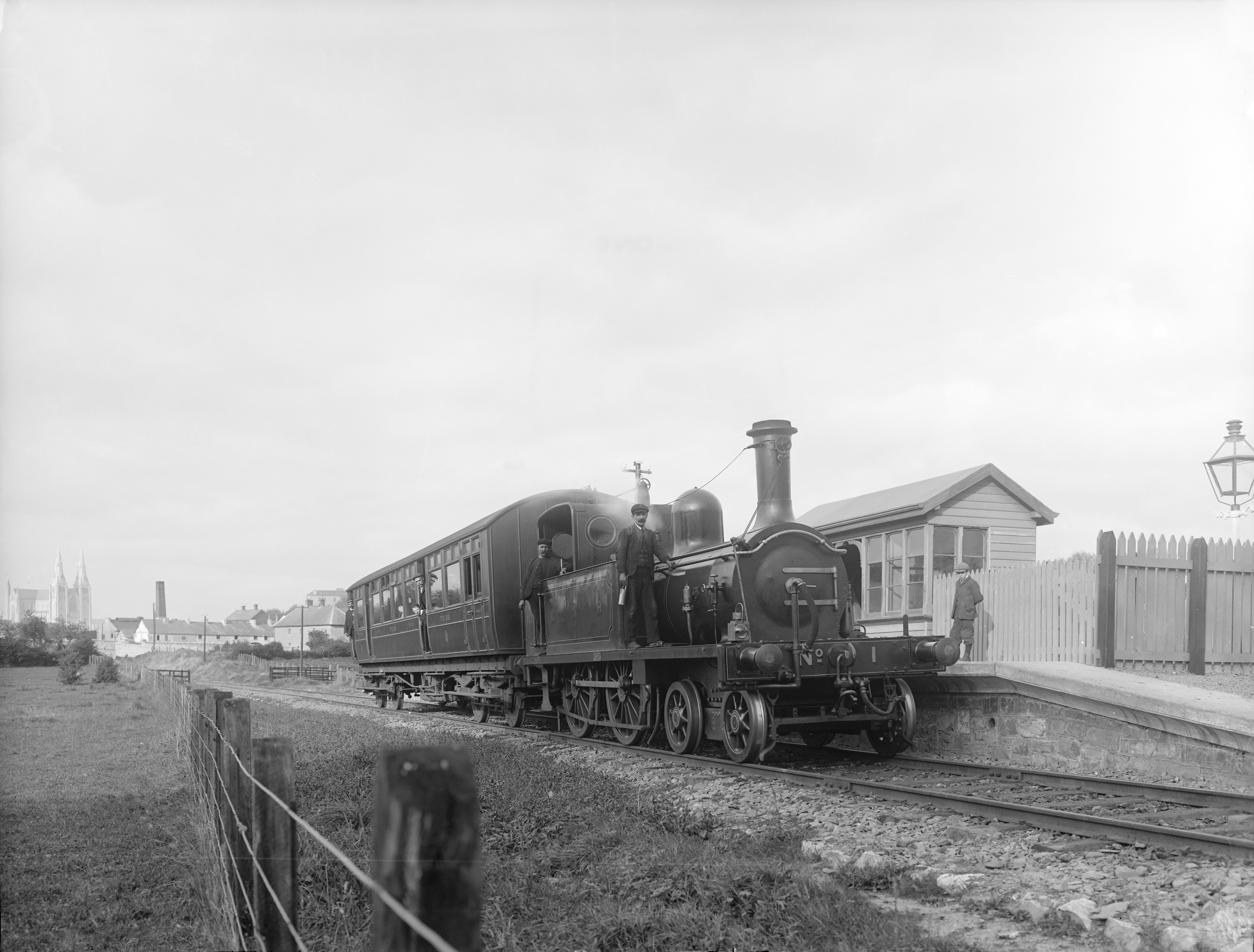
Train at Irish Street Halt, before heading to Milford. 1909
