= Milford station =

Milford station may refer to:

== Railway stations ==
- Milford station (Connecticut), on the New Haven Line/Shore Line East in Milford, Connecticut, United States
- Milford station (Delaware), a disused station in Milford, Delaware, United States
- Milford station (Illinois), a station in Milford, Illinois, United States
- Milford Railway Station, Surrey on the Portsmouth Direct Line, United Kingdom
- Milford railway station (Northern Ireland), on the Castleblayney, Keady and Armagh Railway in Northern Ireland
- Milford railway station (Wiltshire), United Kingdom, opened by the London and South Western Railway in 1847
- Milford Haven railway station, also known as Milford, and Old Milford, in Milford Haven in Pembrokeshire, Wales, United Kingdom
- South Milford railway station, formerly Milford railway station, on the Leeds to Selby line, United Kingdom
- Milford Old junction railway station, also known as York Junction, and Gascoigne Wood; on the Leeds to Selby line, United Kingdom
- Milford Junction railway station on the York and North Midland Railway, United Kingdom

== Places ==
- Milford Station, Nova Scotia, a locality in Canada
