= Beaupark railway station =

Station in Ireland, on the Drogheda-to-Navan line

Coordinates: 53.6840°N 6.5732°W

Beauparc railway station
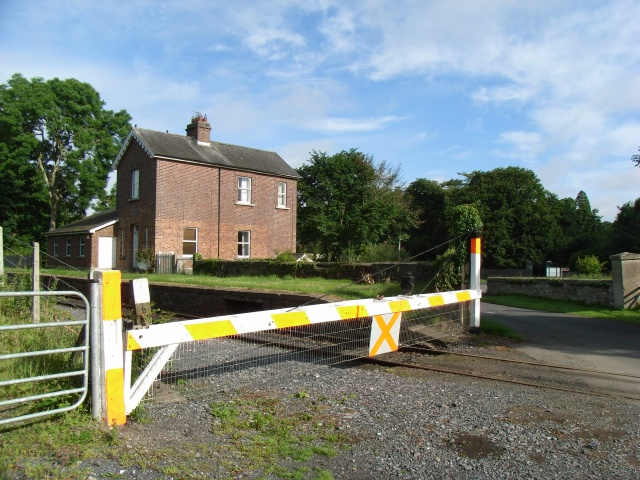

General information
- Location: Ireland
- System: Irish Rail station
- Line: Drogheda–Navan line

History
- Opened: 1 September 1850
- Closed: 12 April 1958
- Former names: Dublin and Drogheda Railway; Great Northern Railway of Ireland
Location

Beauparc railway station was a station in Ireland, on the Drogheda-to-Navan line, currently used for freight only services provided by Irish Rail. It was opened on 1 September 1850 by the Dublin and Drogheda Railway, which became part of the Great Northern Railway of Ireland system, and closed on 12 April 1958.

== Rail replacement bus ==
A rail replacement bus was introduced in 1958 and served Beauparc for a number of years though no longer does so. The replacement route continued until 2013 as Bus Éireann route 188 (Drogheda-Duleek-Slane-Navan with a latter extension to Trim). The nearest bus stop to Beauparc is now at McGruder's Cross (junction of the road leading to Beauparc with the N2 road).

Preceding station	Disused railways	Following station
Lougher	Great Northern Railway (Ireland); Drogheda-Oldcastle	Navan
