= Ballyards Halt railway station =

Railway station in Northern Ireland

Ballyards Halt

General information
- Location: Ballyards Road, Ballyards; County Armagh; Northern Ireland
- Coordinates: 54.30733°N 6.6829°W
- Elevation: 245 ft (75 m)
- Platforms: 1
- Tracks: 1

Construction
- Structure type: Halt

History
- Opened: 1 December 1909
- Closed: 1 February 1933
- Original company: Castleblayney, Keady and Armagh Railway
- Post-grouping: Great Northern Railway (Ireland)
Location

Ballyards was a halt at the Ballyards Rd. level crossing on the Castleblayney, Keady and Armagh Railway in Northern Ireland.

The station opened on 1 December 1909 and closed on 1 February 1933.

| Preceding station | Disused railways | Following station |
|---|---|---|
| Milford (CKAR) | Castleblayney, Keady and Armagh Railway; Armagh to Castleblayney | Tassagh Halt |
