= Liffey Bridge =

Liffey Bridge may refer to a number of bridges over the River Liffey, including:

- Ha'penny Bridge, officially named the Liffey Bridge
- Liffey Railway Bridge, a rail bridge linking Heuston and Connolly Stations via the Phoenix Park Tunnel
