= Keady railway station =

Railway station in Northern Ireland

Keady
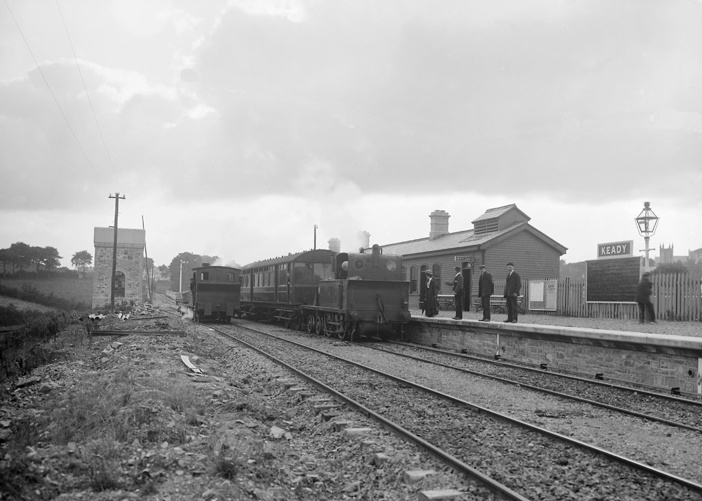
- Station in 1910.

General information
- Location: Keady, County Armagh; Northern Ireland; UK
- Coordinates: 54.251684°N 6.699690°W
- Elevation: 470 ft (140 m)
- Platforms: 1

History
- Original company: Castleblayney, Keady and Armagh Railway
- Post-grouping: Great Northern Railway (Ireland)

Key dates
- 31 May 1909: Station opens
- 1 February 1932: Station closes to passengers
- 1 October 1957: Station closes
Location

Keady railway station was on the Castleblayney, Keady and Armagh Railway in Northern Ireland. It served the town of Keady in County Armagh, Northern Ireland.

== History ==
Following their acquisition of the Dublin and Meath and Navan and Kingscourt Railways in 1888, the Midland Great Western Railway (MGWR) envisaged extending the now "Meath Road" branch line from Kingscourt to Armagh, and possibly even to Cookstown, but this never materialised. Part of this proposal did eventually come to fruition as the Castleblayney, Keady and Armagh Railway in 1902. The line was opened on the 31 May 1909 and operated by the Great Northern Railway (Ireland), although some reports suggest the line opened to goods the year prior. Keady was the initial terminus for the line before it was extended to Castleblayney the following year. The CK&A was then purchased by the GNRI the year after that, becoming the Keady branch.

The station became the southern terminus again in 1923 with the closure of the line south of Keady due to the effects of partition and the border. The Keady branch was closed to passenger traffic on 1 February 1932. In 1957 the Government of Northern Ireland made the GNR close much of its remaining network in Northern Ireland, including goods traffic from the remaining section of the Keady branch from 1 October 1957.

== Routes ==
Preceding station	Disused railways	Following station
Tassagh Halt	Castleblayney, Keady and Armagh Railway; Armagh to Castleblayney	Carnagh

== Sources ==
- Arnold, Robert McCullough (1980). The Golden Years of the Great Northern Railway. Belfast: Blackstaff Press.
- Baker, Michael H.C. (1972). Irish Railways since 1916. London: Ian Allan. ISBN 0-7110-0282-7.
