= Oldcastle branch line =

Railway line in County Meath, Ireland

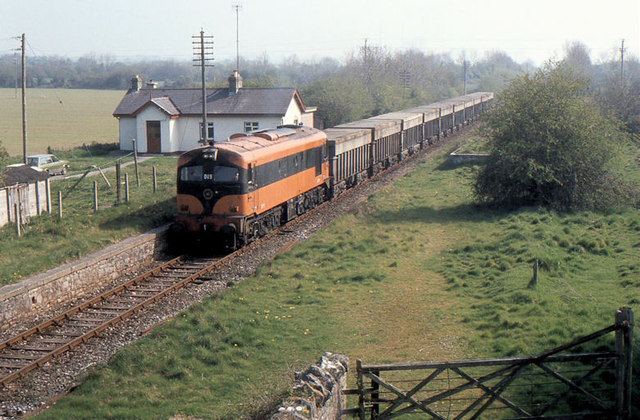
- A Tara Mines train passes Duleek

Overview
- Status: Partially closed
- Owner: D&B Jct Railway (1863); Great Northern (1876)
- Locale: County Meath, Leinster
- Termini: Drogheda; Oldcastle

Service
- Operator: Iarnród Éireann

History
- Opened: 1850
- Closed: 14 April 1958 (passengers); 1 April 1963 (beyond Navan)

Technical
- Line length: 39.5 mi (63.6 km)
- Track gauge: 1,600 mm (5 ft 3 in) Irish gauge

The Oldcastle branch line (Irish: fó-líne iarnróid An tSeanchaisleán) is a partially-closed railway line in County Meath, Ireland. It is a branch line starting in Oldcastle and ending at Drogheda on the main line between Belfast and Dublin. This line was connected to the Midland Great Western line from Dublin to Navan until 1963. The line was opened to Navan in 1850, Kells in 1853, and would finally reach Oldcastle in March 17, 1863, serving passengers for over a hundred years.

According to commemorative plaques on the site of Oldcastle station, the line was just under 13 miles long, took two and a half years to build, and cost £73,683,14s,3d.

== History ==
The construction of a railway between Drogheda and Navan by the Dublin and Belfast Junction Railway received royal assent on 21 July 1845 and was completed and opened on 15 February 1850. An extension to Kells received royal assent on 2 July 1847 and was opened on 11 July 1853. The final extension to Oldcastle got assent on 3 July 1860 and opened on 17 March 1863.

Oldcastle's train yard consisted of a warehouse and station master's house built in Italianate style. By the early 1910s, four trains operated on the line; none on Sundays. The station handled parcels, passengers, furniture, carriages, portable engines, and livestock, serving as the heart of Oldcastle's market economy. The station had a crane capable of lifting 3 tons.

According to commemorative plaques, the rail line was also useful for locals who traveled in and out of Oldcastle; the workhouse would use the line to send patients down to Dublin for specialised treatments. In 1895, a "development committee" promoted the rail line as a means of boosting tourism in Oldcastle.

During World War I, Oldcastle housed a detention camp for prisoners of war. On 12 December 1914, the rail line was used to transport 68 German prisoners into the town. Two days later, another 26 civilians were moved into the camp. This continued steadily from late 1914 to 1915; 304 inmates were in the camp by February 1915. This number increased to 579 by June 1916. This was reported on by the Meath Chronicle, writing that the "long expected German prisoners arrived this week in Oldcastle and took up quarters in the disused workhouse". John Smith also wrote an article on the subject.

Stops on the branch line included stations at Duleek and Beaupark. Lougher halt, at the 8-and-a-half-mile milepost, opened in 1940.

For most of its history, steam locomotives operated on the Oldcastle railway, but between 1949 and the late 1950s, there was investment in diesel engines. In 1950, nationalisation of CIÉ (the state transport company in the Republic of Ireland) threatened the existence of several lines, and in April 1958, the Oldcastle railway lost its passenger service. On 30 April 1963, most goods services were withdrawn and the line from Navan to Oldcastle was closed. The line to Drogheda was kept open for gypsum traffic from Kingscourt until 2001 and some of the track to Kells was relaid in 1977 for zinc and lead traffic from Tara Mine and remained in operation until the mine's operational suspension in 2023.

== Dismantlement and legacy ==
After 1963, the Oldcastle line was left to deteriorate. Most tracks west of Navan were ripped up but a single-arch bridge, Cooney's Bridge, built over the line in the late 1800s remains intact to this day (the bridge's National Inventory of Architectural Heritage entry suggests that it was built in c. 1880 but carvings in the bridge's stonework date it to 1862).

The station master's house at Oldcastle is now a private residence. The train yard was broken up between the Oldcastle Co-Operative Limited and Gleneagle Woodcraft Limited.

In the late 2010s, the Oldcastle Tidy Towns Committee created a garden and set up plaques in commemoration of the Oldcastle railway. Oldcastle Co-Operative co-funded the community project. The old station's crane was restored and placed in the garden.

== Gallery ==
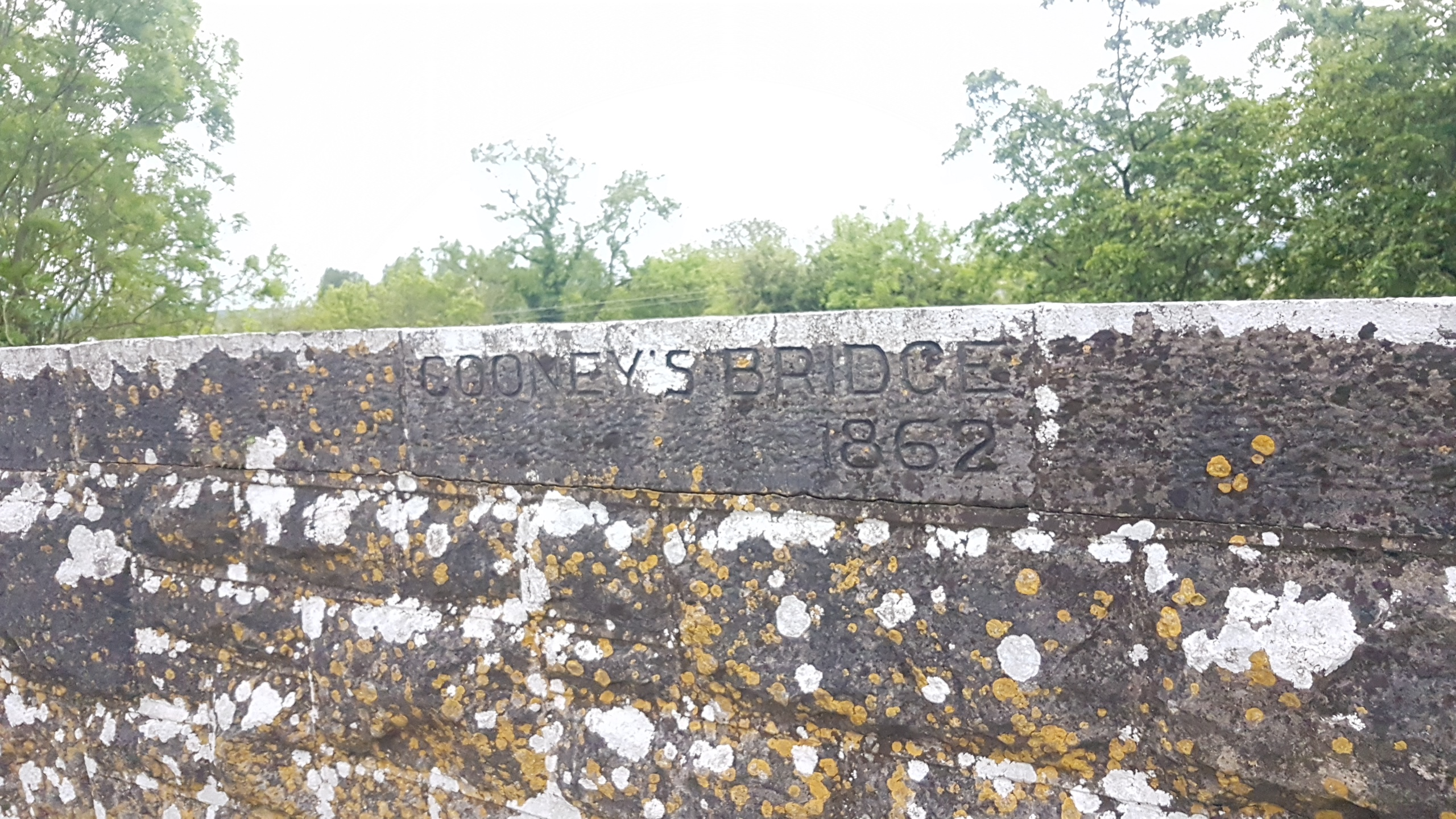
Carvings on Cooney's Bridge dating its completion to 1862.

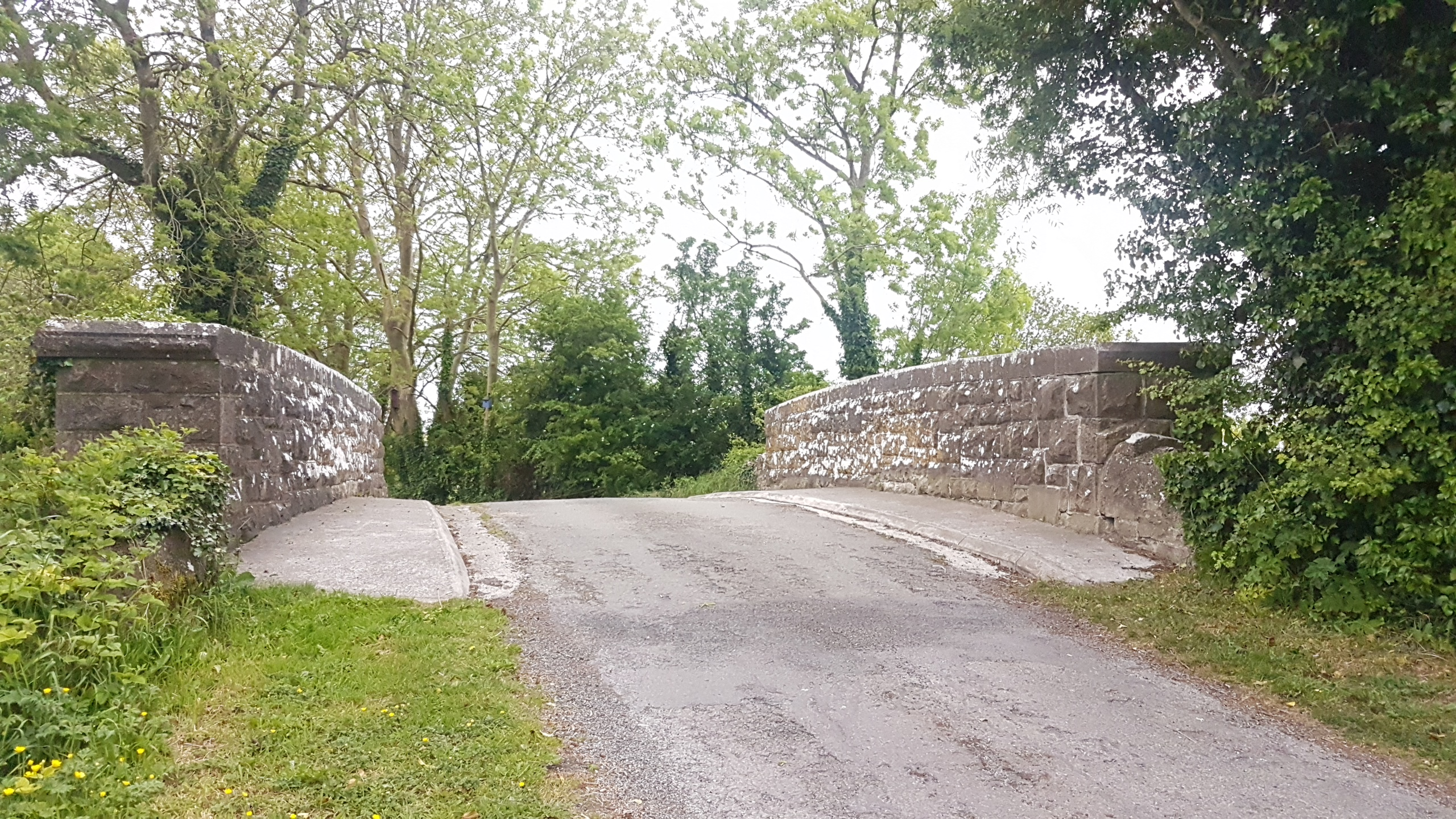
Cooney's Bridge from the west.

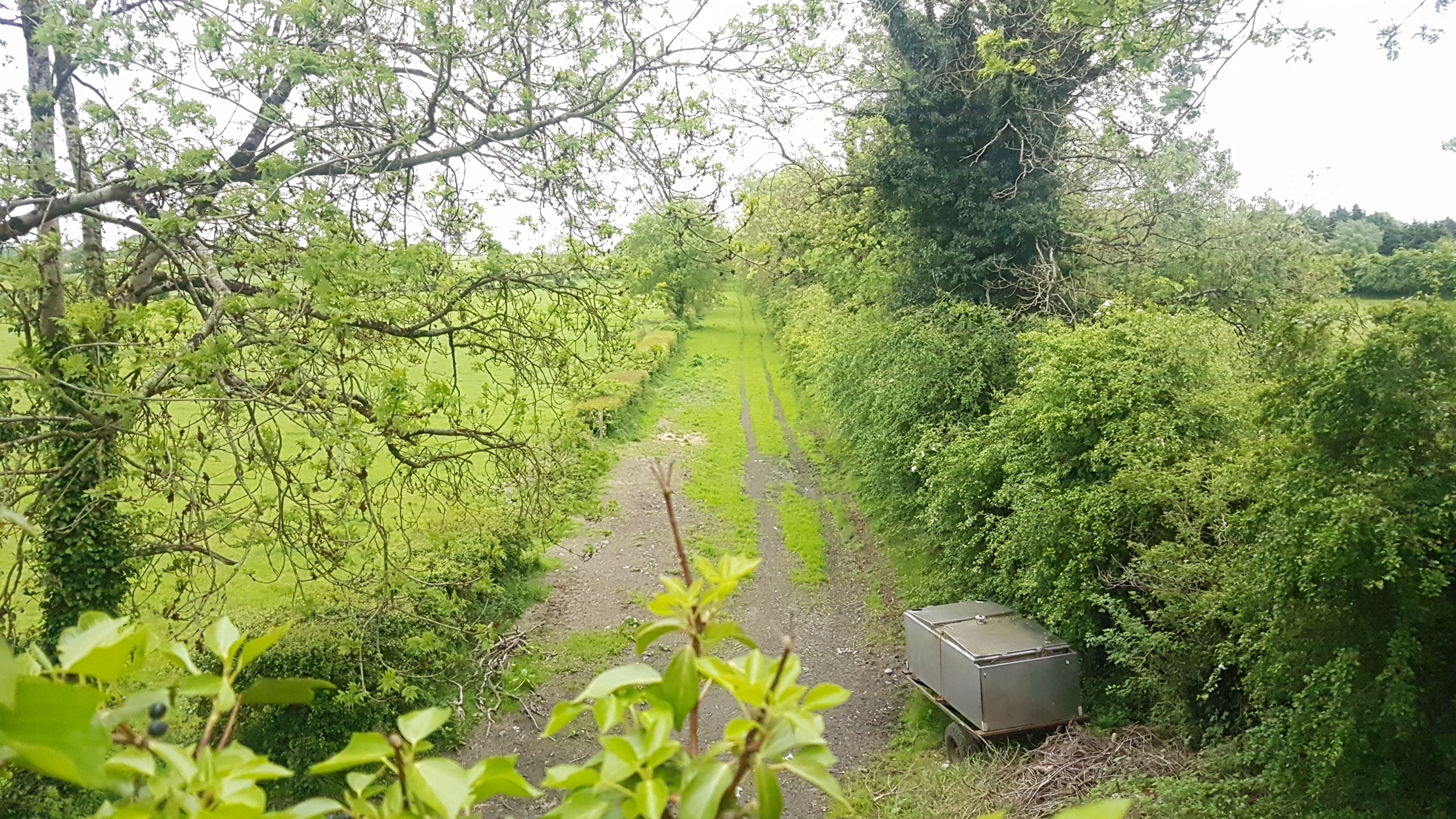
Stripped rail line.

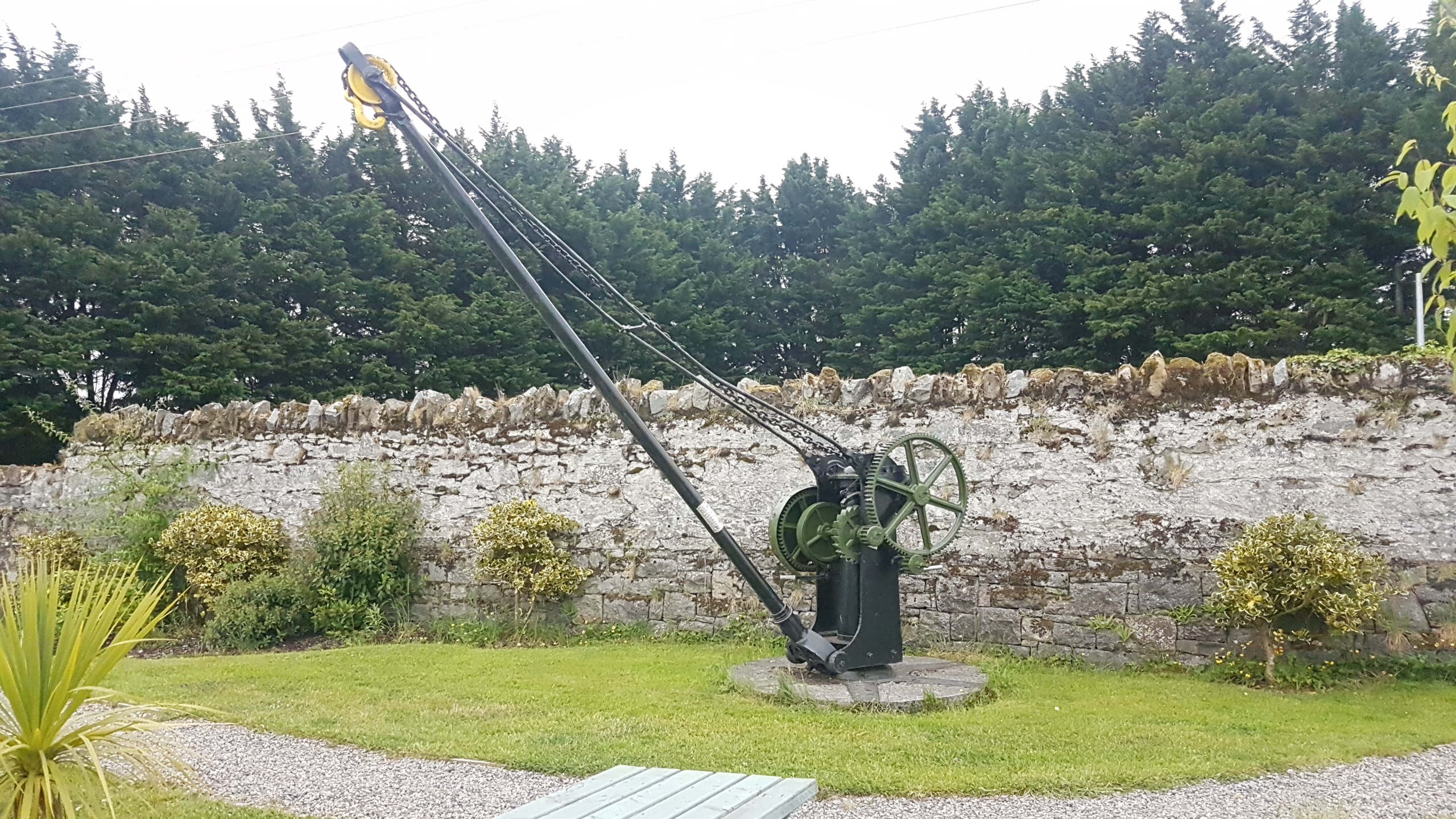
Restored station crane.

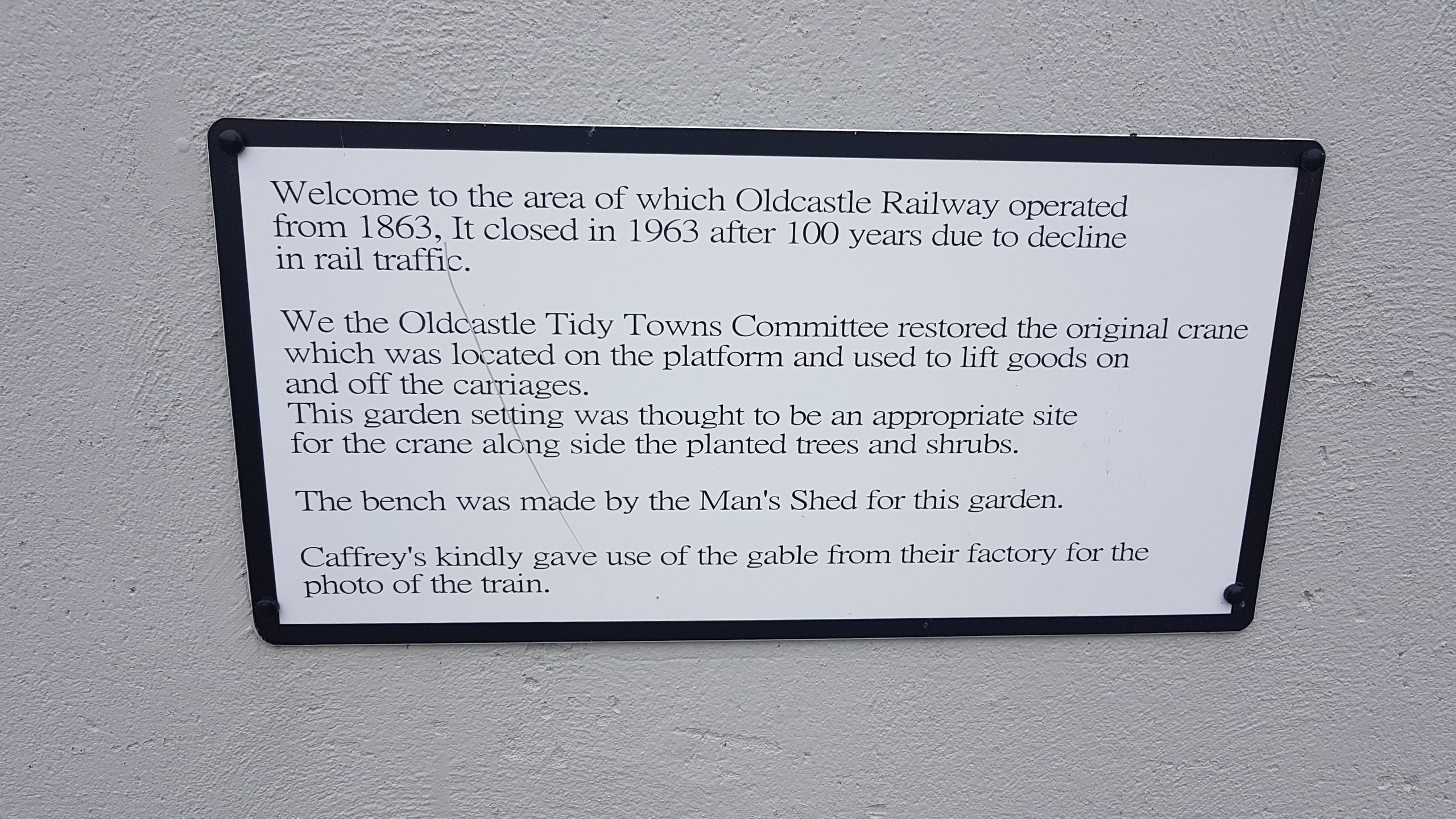
Commemorative plaque on the site of the old station.

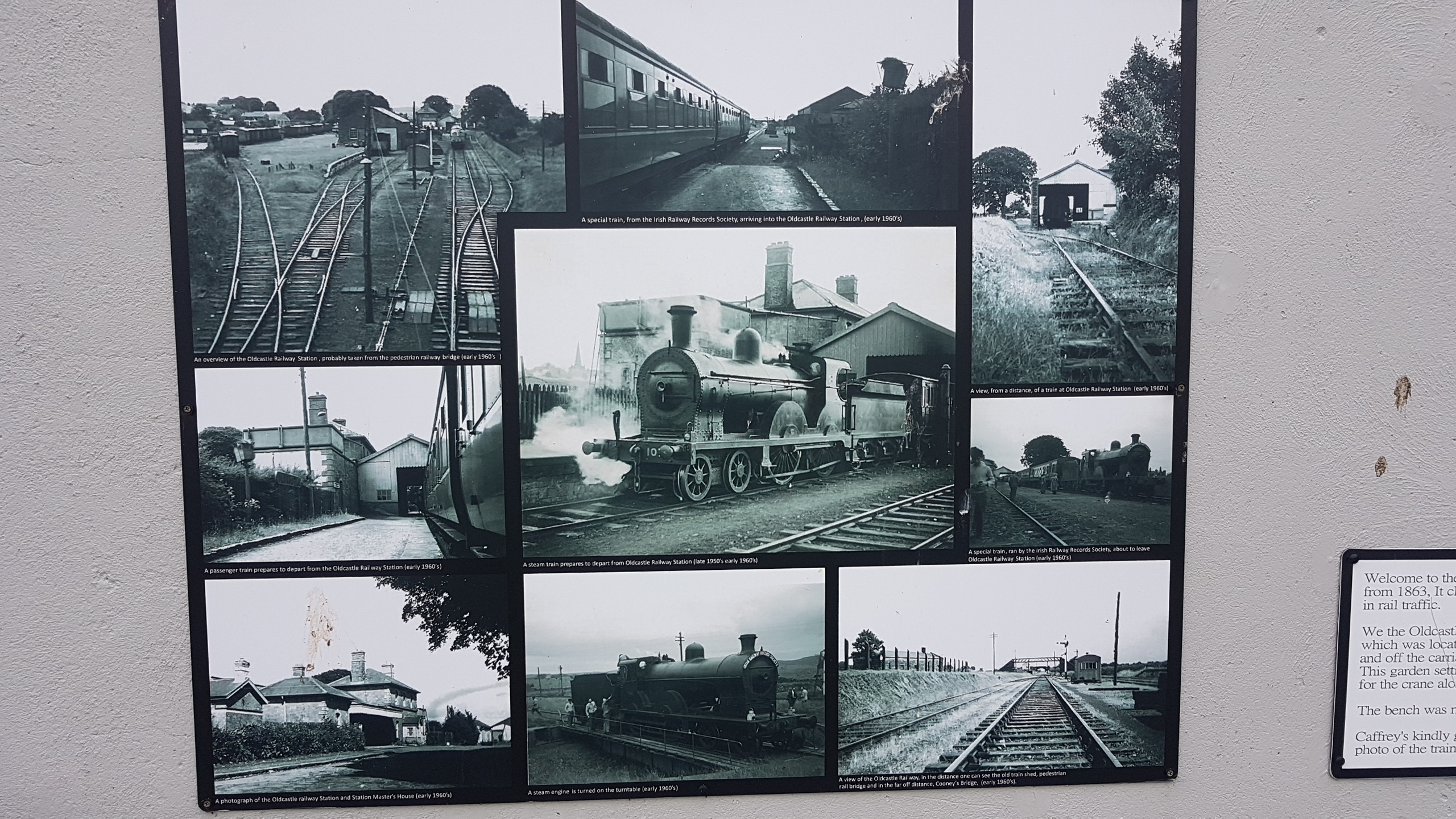
Commemorative plaque depicting Oldcastle station while it was active.

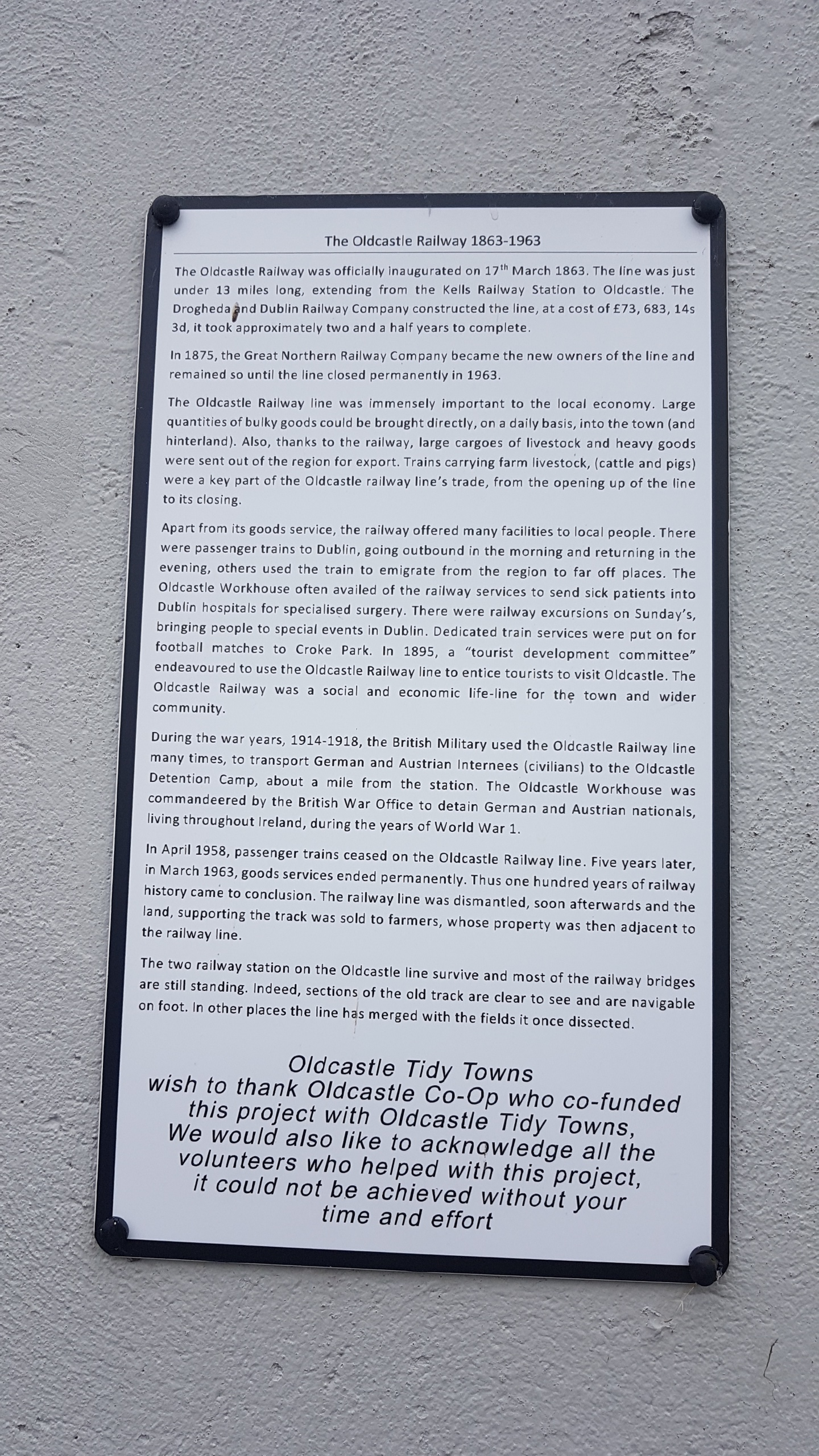
Informational plaque detailing the Oldcastle railway line's history.

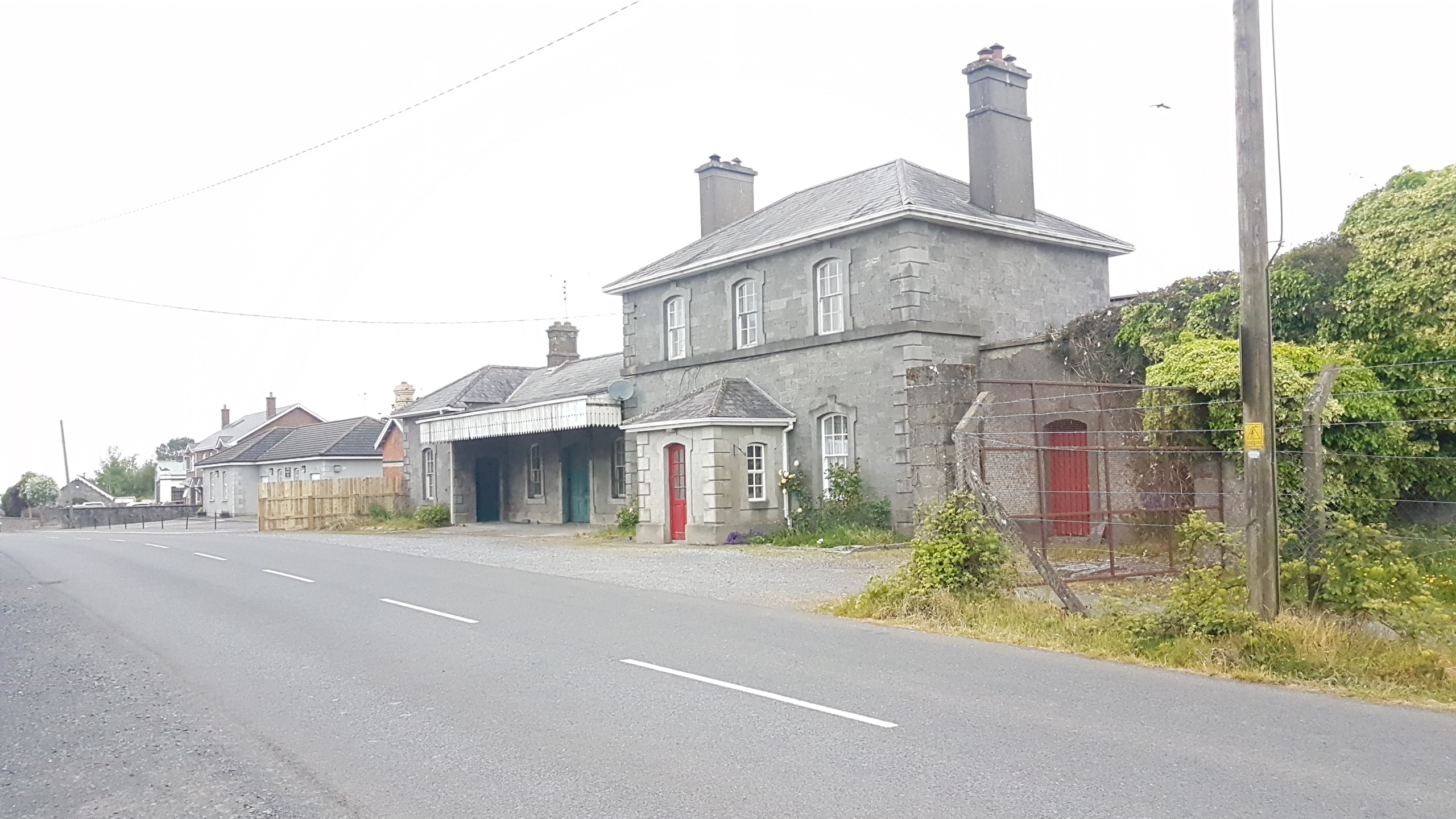
Old station master's residence.

== See also ==
- Dublin-Navan railway line
- Bibliography of Irish rail transport
- History of rail transport in Ireland
