= Carnagh railway station =

Railway station in Northern Ireland

Carnagh

General information
- Location: Carnagh, County Armagh; Northern Ireland; UK

History
- Original company: Castleblayney, Keady and Armagh Railway
- Post-grouping: Great Northern Railway (Ireland)

Key dates
- 1 December 1911: Station opens
- 2 April 1923: Station closes

Carnagh railway station was on the Castleblayney, Keady and Armagh Railway in Northern Ireland.

The Castleblayney, Keady and Armagh Railway opened the station on 1 December 1911.

It closed on 2 April 1923.

== Routes ==
Preceding station	Disused railways	Following station
Keady	Castleblayney, Keady and Armagh Railway; Armagh to Castleblayney	Creaghanroe
