= Tassagh Halt railway station =

Rail facility in County Armagh, Northern Ireland

Tasasgh Halt

General information
- Location: Tassagh, County Armagh; Northern Ireland; UK

History
- Original company: Castleblayney, Keady and Armagh Railway
- Post-grouping: Great Northern Railway (Ireland)

Key dates
- 1 May 1911: Station opens
- 1 February 1932: Station closes

Tassagh Halt railway station was on the Castleblayney, Keady and Armagh Railway in Northern Ireland.

The Castleblayney, Keady and Armagh Railway opened the station on 1 May 1911.

It closed on 1 February 1932.

== Routes ==
| Preceding station | Disused railways | Following station |
|---|---|---|
| Ballyards Halt | Castleblayney, Keady and Armagh Railway; Armagh to Castleblayney | Keady |
