= Liffey Railway Bridge =

Bridge over the River Liffey in Ireland

Liffey Railway Bridge Droichead Iarnróid na Life
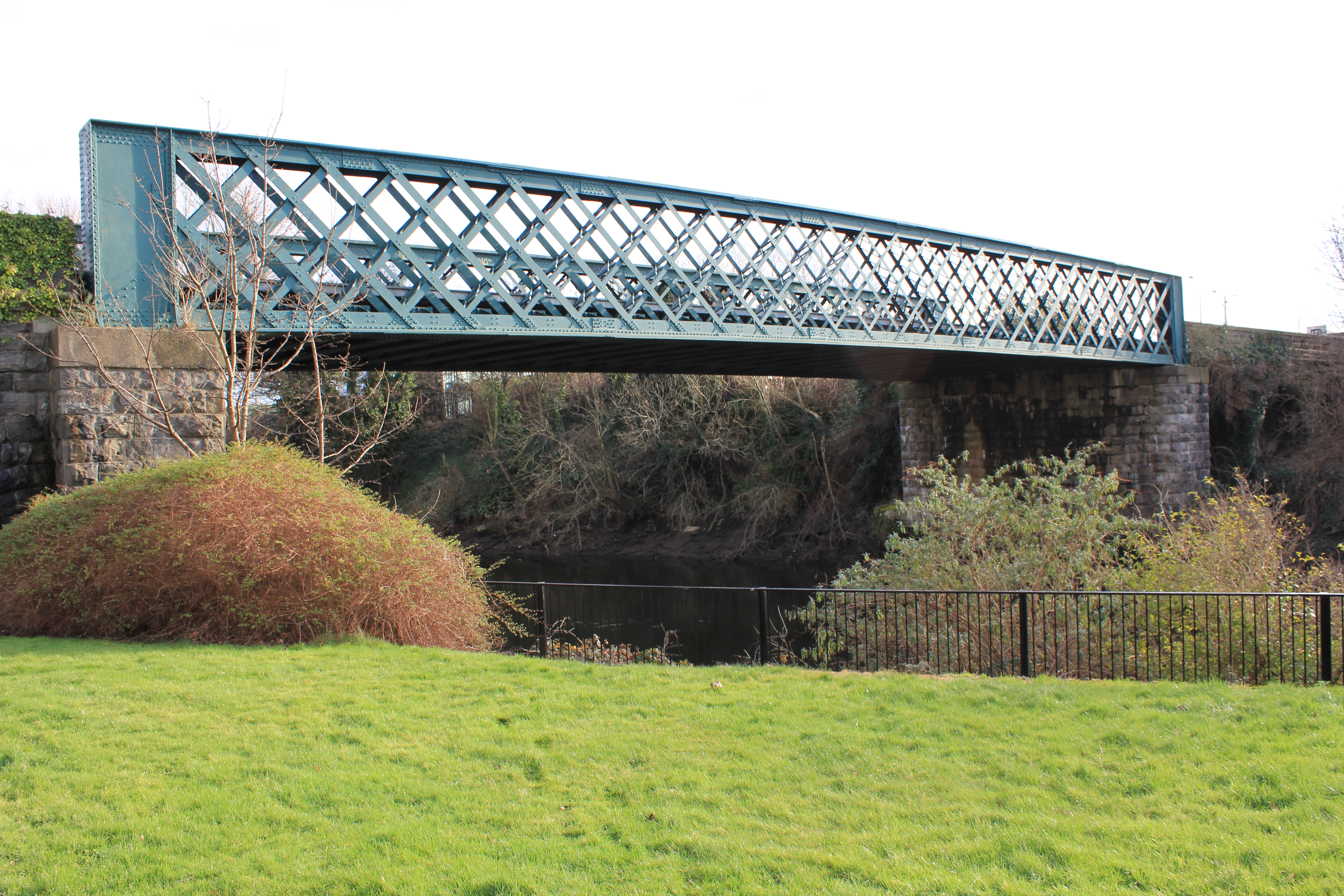
- Coordinates: 53.3474°N 6.3033°W
- Carries: Railway
- Crosses: River Liffey
- Locale: Dublin
- Maintained by: Iarnród Éireann
- Preceded by: Islandbridge
- Followed by: Seán Heuston Bridge

Characteristics
- Material: Wrought iron

History
- Construction end: 1877; 149 years ago

Location
- Interactive map of Liffey Railway Bridge

The Liffey Railway Bridge is a rail bridge spanning the River Liffey near Heuston railway station in Dublin in Ireland.

It is a wrought iron box truss structure, and joins lines from Heuston Station to Connolly Station through the Phoenix Park Tunnel.

Historically used primarily for freight traffic, in November 2016, the bridge and tunnel were reopened to more regular passenger traffic.

== History ==
The bridge and tunnel were built by the Great Southern and Western Railway (GSWR) company to connect Kingsbridge station to the Dublin docklands. Before the line was built the Midland & Great Western Railway (MGWR) company had built a railway along the Royal Canal which enabled them to transport goods directly from Spencer Dock to Broadstone station where MGWR was based.

The GSWR had to transfer the goods from the docks by road to Heuston which was time-consuming and costly so they built the line to connect with the MGWR line at Cabra. Later, because of the cost that MGWR were charging GSR for the use of its line to the docklands, a new line was built directly to the docklands.

For some time, the bridge and tunnel were not used for regular passenger services, and traffic over the bridge was largely limited to freight traffic and for shunting of engines between Connolly and Heuston. An exception to this was occasional match-day services carrying Gaelic Athletic Association fans from southern lines to Connolly Station for Croke Park stadium. However, from the early 21st century, rail transport planners and interest groups such as Platform 11 debated the use of the bridge and tunnel to link the operationally separate passenger lines which then terminated at Heuston and Connolly stations. Ultimately, in November 2016, the bridge and tunnel were reopened to more regular passenger traffic.
