= Tassagh Viaduct =

Railway bridge in Northern Ireland

Coordinates: 54.2863°N 6.6783°W

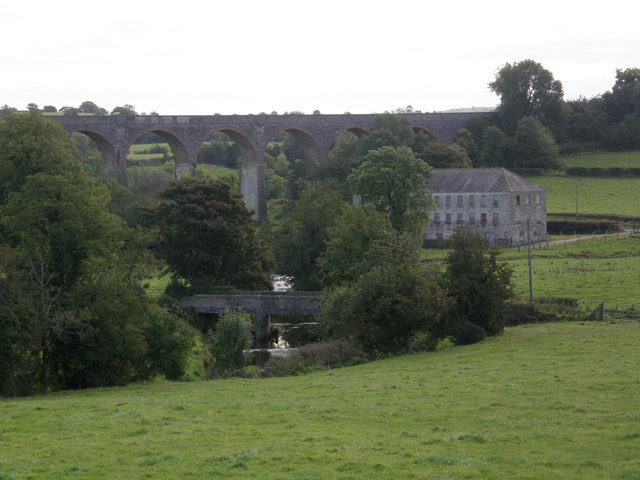
The viaduct in 2007

The Tassagh Viaduct is a railway viaduct near Tassagh, County Armagh, Northern Ireland. Tassagh Beetling Mill sits almost immediately beneath it.

== History ==
The viaduct was completed in 1910, bridging the Callan River Valley. It was originally part of the Castleblayney, Keady and Armagh Railway, though services to Castleblayney were ended in 1924 and from 1932 onwards, all trains across the Tassagh Viaduct were goods trains to and from Keady- It was at this time that the nearby Tassagh Halt closed. The line had been taken over by the Great Northern Railway (Ireland) shortly after opening.

Final closure of the line and viaduct came in 1957. In December 1976, Tassagh Viaduct became a Grade B listed building.

== Design ==
The viaduct is 11 arches long, and at its greatest height, 24 metres. It is 174 metres in length, and built of concrete (piers) and brick (arches and vaulting).
