= Dublin–Navan railway line =

Railway line in Ireland

Dublin to Navan line
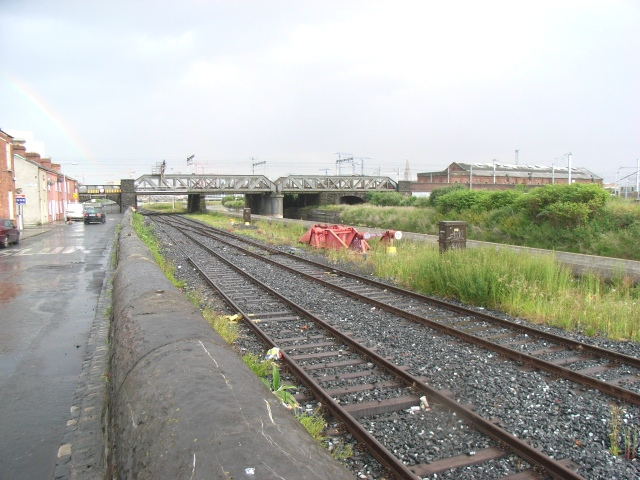
- A section of the line in the Dublin Docklands

Overview
- Status: Operational
- Owner: Iarnród Éireann
- Locale: Ireland
- Termini: Docklands; M3 Parkway
- Stations: 10

Service
- Type: Commuter rail, Suburban rail
- System: Iarnród Éireann
- Operator(s): Iarnród Éireann; Commuter
- Rolling stock: 29000 Class; 22000 Class

History
- Opened: 29 August 1862
- Closed: 27 January 1947
- Reopened: 3 September 2010

Technical
- Line length: 64 km (40 mi)
- Number of tracks: Double track
- Character: Secondary
- Track gauge: 1,600 mm (5 ft 3 in) Irish gauge
- Electrification: Not electrified

The Dublin-Navan line (via Clonsilla) is a partially-open commuter rail line between Dublin and the town of Navan in County Meath. Since September 2010, train services operate from Docklands Station to M3 Parkway, with an extension to Navan itself proposed.

== History ==
=== Background ===
Dublin and Meath Railway Act 1858
- Act of Parliament
- Parliament of the United Kingdom
- Long title: An Act for making a Railway Communication between Dublin and Meath.
- Citation: 21 & 22 Vict. c. cxix

Dates
- Royal assent: 23 July 1858

Dublin and Meath Railway Act 1862
- Act of Parliament
- Parliament of the United Kingdom
- Long title: An Act to enable the Dublin and Meath Railway Company to raise additional Capital; and for other Purposes.
- Citation: 25 & 26 Vict. c. xxxix

Dates
- Royal assent: 3 June 1862

Dublin and Meath Railway Act 1864
- Act of Parliament
- Parliament of the United Kingdom
- Long title: An Act to enable the Dublin and Meath Railway Company to raise a further Sum of Money; and for other Purposes.
- Citation: 27 & 28 Vict. c. xxviii

Dates
- Royal assent: 13 May 1864

Dublin and Meath Railway (Working Agreement) Act 1869
- Act of Parliament
- Parliament of the United Kingdom
- Long title: An Act to confirm a Working Agreement between the Dublin and Meath Railway Company and the Midland Great Western Railway of Ireland Company; and for other purposes.
- Citation: 32 & 33 Vict. c. xiii

Dates
- Royal assent: 13 May 1869

Navan was originally a significant part of the expanding rail network in Ireland. The Dublin and Drogheda Railway first constructed a branch from the Dublin-Belfast main line through Navan to the town of Oldcastle which opened in 1850. The Dublin and Meath Railway was authorised by the Dublin and Meath Railway Act 1858 (21 & 22 Vict. c. cxix) to construct a branch from Clonsilla to Navan off the MGWR main line to Sligo, which was opened in 1862. This line was extended to Kingscourt in County Cavan in 1875, operated by the Navan and Kingscourt Railway. Both of these lines were eventually purchased by the MGWR, while the Oldcastle line was eventually incorporated into the GNR(I). Navan railway station itself was a small single platform stop on the Oldcastle line. The main station for the town was Navan Junction, which had four platforms serving trains on both routes.

In the 1950s and 1960s, there was a large scale rationalisation of the railway network in Ireland, which saw Córas Iompair Éireann close large sections of line. Passenger services on the Kingscourt line were ended in 1947, while on the Oldcastle line they continued until 1958. The lines from Clonsilla and Oldcastle to Navan were lifted in 1963, with the remainder remaining open for freight use following the withdrawal of passenger services - the Gypsum Industries plant in Kingscourt utilised the line as far as Navan Junction before transferring to the Oldcastle line to transport gypsum to the Platin Cement Works just outside Drogheda, while the Tara Mine also uses the Oldcastle branch to transport lead and zinc. Following industrial action by Iarnród Éireann train drivers in 2001, gypsum freight services from Kingscourt were transferred to road haulage, which led to the remainder of the line being mothballed. The line was eventually lifted to create the Boyne Valley to Lakelands Greenway, which was completed in 2024.

=== Initial proposal and opening to M3 Parkway ===
The growth of the economy in County Meath, added to the increase in the population of Navan, has led to calls over the past few years for a rail service to be reinstated from Dublin.

As part of the Transport 21 plan announced by the Irish Government in 2005, the line to Navan was to be rebuilt in two phases as a branch of the Western Commuter line. The first phase would see a 7.5 km stretch from the junction west of Clonsilla. This would feature three new railway stations at Hansfield, Dunboyne and a park and ride interchange called M3 Parkway. The M3 Parkway station opened in September 2010.

=== Extension to Navan ===
The second phase was originally planned to be completed by 2016 but, as of 2019, was deferred and subject to "review". If completed as planned it would see the line extended from M3 Parkway to Navan itself, with further stations at Dunshaughlin, Kilmessan and two in Navan (provisionally titled Navan Central and Navan North). The former, Navan Central, was proposed to be located near Páirc Tailteann. Plans expected that the latter station, Navan North, would be the northern terminus of a reinstated line. Plans for both the Dunshaughlin and Kilmessan stations were deferred due to the reduction in exchequer funding for capital investment programmes.

Since the early 21st century, Docklands has served as the terminus for peak time services on the Western Commuter originating from M3 Parkway. The proposal would have seen this station expanded to become the main terminus for Western Commuter services, including from Navan. However, in 2007, Iarnród Éireann announced plans to restore rail services to the long closed Dublin Broadstone station, which IÉ planned to use as its major terminus for commuter services from Mullingar and Navan.

In March 2008, the transport minister blocked these proposals in favour of utilising Broadstone for the Luas system, instead encouraging IÉ to seek planning permission to keep Docklands as the terminus for the Navan line and services from Maynooth and Kildare. As part of the wider improvements to the commuter network around Dublin, it is proposed to electrify the line as far as M3 Parkway which will form part of the planned DART Line 1.

By 2019, no progress had been made on the proposed Navan extension. That year, the Irish government's regional spatial strategy recommended that the status of the plans be downgraded from "implementation" to "review"; seen as a setback to the opening of the line. However, by the end of 2020 the line was once again included as part of a consultation into updating the Greater Dublin Area Transport Strategy.

In January 2023, the Government of Ireland approved a bill for a €750 million development plan for the rest of the line to Navan, with a possible opening by 2036. An All-Island Strategic Rail Review draft was published jointly by the Irish and Northern Irish governments in July 2023, and recommended electrification of the full line from Dublin to Navan for DART integration.

Consultants were sought for the project in November 2024.

In May 2026, Iarnród Éireann published the Emerging Preferred Route for the new Navan Railway. If developed as proposed, the new 34-kilometre electrified route would see the existing rail line extended from M3 Parkway, with new stations proposed at Dunshaughlin, Kilmessan, Navan Central and terminating at Navan North, allowing trains up to every 15 minutes at peak between Navan and Dublin's Connolly station. At the time it was suggested that a planning application (railway order) for the proposed line could be lodged in 2028, with construction potentially beginning in 2030. The plan is opposed by Randal Plunkett, 21st Baron of Dunsany as the proposed route would require the destruction of woodlands on the Dunsany Estate.

== Criticism ==
Although the proposal to reinstate a rail service between Dublin and Navan has been welcomed, particularly in view of the comparison of cost with the M3 motorway (estimated to be €650 million against €90 million for the railway), there has been criticism of the details of the proposal by the pressure group Rail Users Ireland (formerly Platform 11). This group's alternative proposal would see the relaying of the line between Navan and Drogheda to standards necessary for passenger trains, the installation of two new stations, together with the reopening of Navan station. This would allow services to run from Navan to Connolly Station in Dublin via Drogheda.

Criticism has also been levelled at Meath County Council, with Rail Users Ireland pointing out that part of the rail alignment planned to Navan was obstructed by the installation of a sewer main. The group has also suggested that, given the two-phase approach to implementing the plan, there is little benefit to residents of Navan until the line is extended there, due to the current positioning of the toll collection points near M3 Parkway station. In addition to this station being 30 kilometres (19 mi) from Navan itself, the toll point is positioned before drivers reach the station.
