= Creaghanroe railway station =

Railway station in Ireland

Creaghanroe
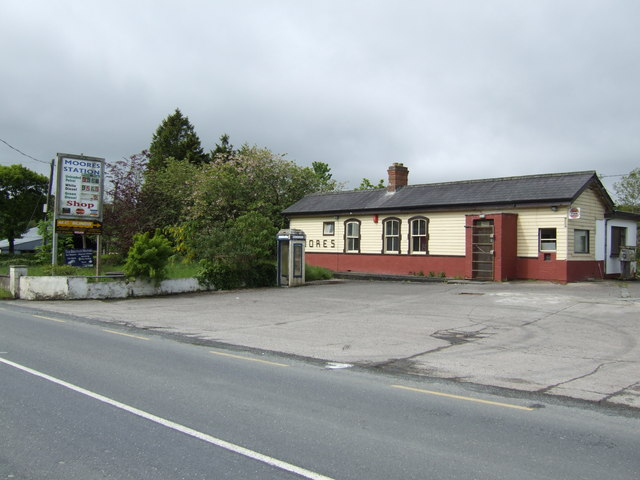
- Moore's Station.

General information
- Location: Creaghanroe, County Monaghan; Ireland
- Coordinates: 54.1724°N 6.7382°W

History
- Original company: Castleblayney, Keady and Armagh Railway
- Post-grouping: Great Northern Railway (Ireland)

Key dates
- 1 December 1910: Station opens
- 2 April 1923: Station closes
Location

Creaghanroe railway station was on the Castleblayney, Keady and Armagh Railway in Ireland.

The Castleblayney, Keady and Armagh Railway opened the station on 1 December 1910.

It closed on 2 April 1923.

== Routes ==
Preceding station	Disused railways	Following station
Carnagh	Castleblayney, Keady and Armagh Railway; Armagh to Castleblayney	Castleblayney
