= Phoenix Park Tunnel =

Railway tunnel in Dublin, Ireland

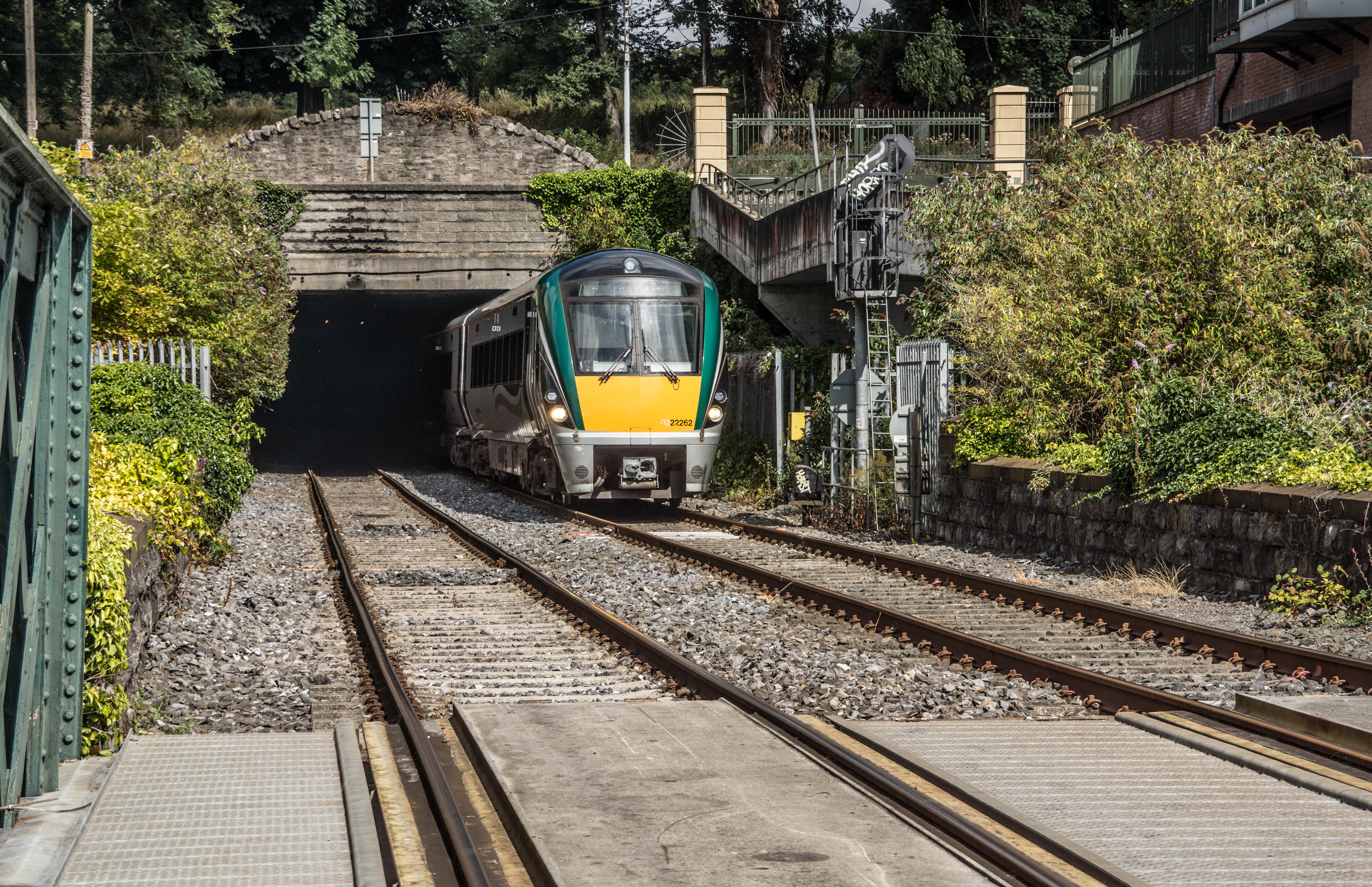
- Southern end of the tunnel
- Interactive map of Phoenix Park Tunnel

Overview
- Other name: Tollán Pháirc na Fhionnuisce
- Location: Dublin, Ireland
- Coordinates: 53.3474°N 6.3033°W
- Route: Heuston Station to Dublin-Sligo railway line
- Start: Dublin Heuston railway station
- End: Dublin-Sligo railway line

Operation
- Opened: 1877
- Owner: Iarnród Éireann
- Operator: Iarnród Éireann
- Character: Through-rail passenger and freight

Technical
- Line length: 757 yards (692 m)
- No. of tracks: Double track
- Track gauge: Irish gauge
- Electrified: Not electrified
- Operating speed: 20 mph

The Phoenix Park Tunnel is a railway tunnel in Dublin, Ireland. The tunnel was built in 1877 and begins at the Liffey Railway Bridge near Heuston Station, running underneath the Phoenix Park for 757 yards (692 m) before re-emerging close to the junction of the Infirmary Road and North Circular Road. It joins with the Sligo line near Glasnevin, before continuing to Dublin Connolly.

The tunnel was originally built by the Great Southern and Western Railway company to connect Kingsbridge station to the Dublin Docklands, and primarily used for freight. Historically the line had not been used for regular passenger trains, with most traffic through the tunnel being freight or carriages and engines shunted between Connolly and Heuston for maintenance. It had occasionally been used for special passenger services, including traffic for major Gaelic Athletic Association fixtures.

It reopened on 21 November 2016 for regular passenger traffic. As of late 2018, this traffic was predominantly weekday services.

In 2025, it was announced that a new station, proposed to be opened at Carnlough Road in Cabra, could use the tunnel in the future.
