= Navan Junction railway station =

Former railway station in Ireland

Navan Junction
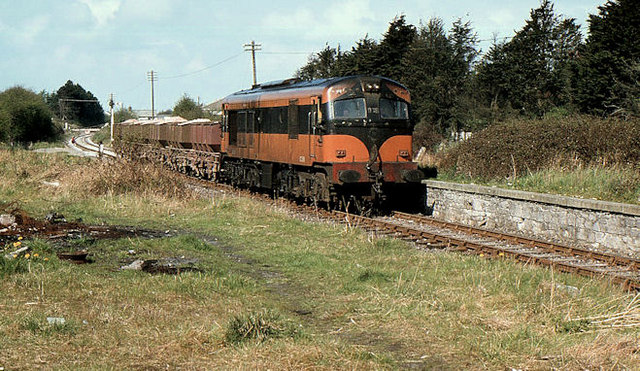
- A train from Kingscourt passing the station in 1982.

General information
- Location: Navan, County Meath; Ireland
- Coordinates: 53.6482°N 6.6919°W

History
- Opened: September 1872
- Closed: 27 January 1947
- Pre-grouping: Midland Great Western Railway
Location

Navan Junction was a railway station serving the town of Navan in County Meath. As the name suggests, the station was located at the junction of two railway lines. The first was a branch line off the main line between Belfast and Dublin, which connected Drogheda and Oldcastle, and opened in 1850. The second, which opened in 1862, was also a branch line, this time off the line from Dublin to Sligo, connecting Clonsilla and Navan. This line was later extended as far as Kingscourt in 1865.

Although Navan had two railway stations, Navan Junction was the main one serving the town, with a total of four platforms serving the two routes. However, following the nationalisation of the railways in Ireland in 1945, a major rationalisation programme led to the closure of many branch lines. Passenger services on the Kingscourt line ended in 1947, and led to the line between Clonsilla and Navan being lifted, while services on the Oldcastle line ended in 1958, with the line between Navan and Oldcastle lifted in 1963. This saw the final closure of Navan Junction station itself.

Today, little remains of the station. Most of the buildings have been demolished, with the exception of the Midland Great Western Railway goods shed and the Great Northern Railway (Ireland) down platform. However, freight trains still pass through the site – until 2001, trains transported gypsum from the Gypsum Industries plant at Kingscourt through the site, while trains from the Tara Mine continue to use the remaining part of the Oldcastle line to transport zinc and lead to Drogheda.

Preceding station	Disused railways	Following station
Navan	Great Northern Railway (Ireland); Drogheda-Oldcastle	Ballybeg
Bective	Midland Great Western Railway; Clonsilla-Kingscourt	Gibbstown
