= Navan liqueur =

Vanilla liqueur

Navan Natural Vanilla Liqueur
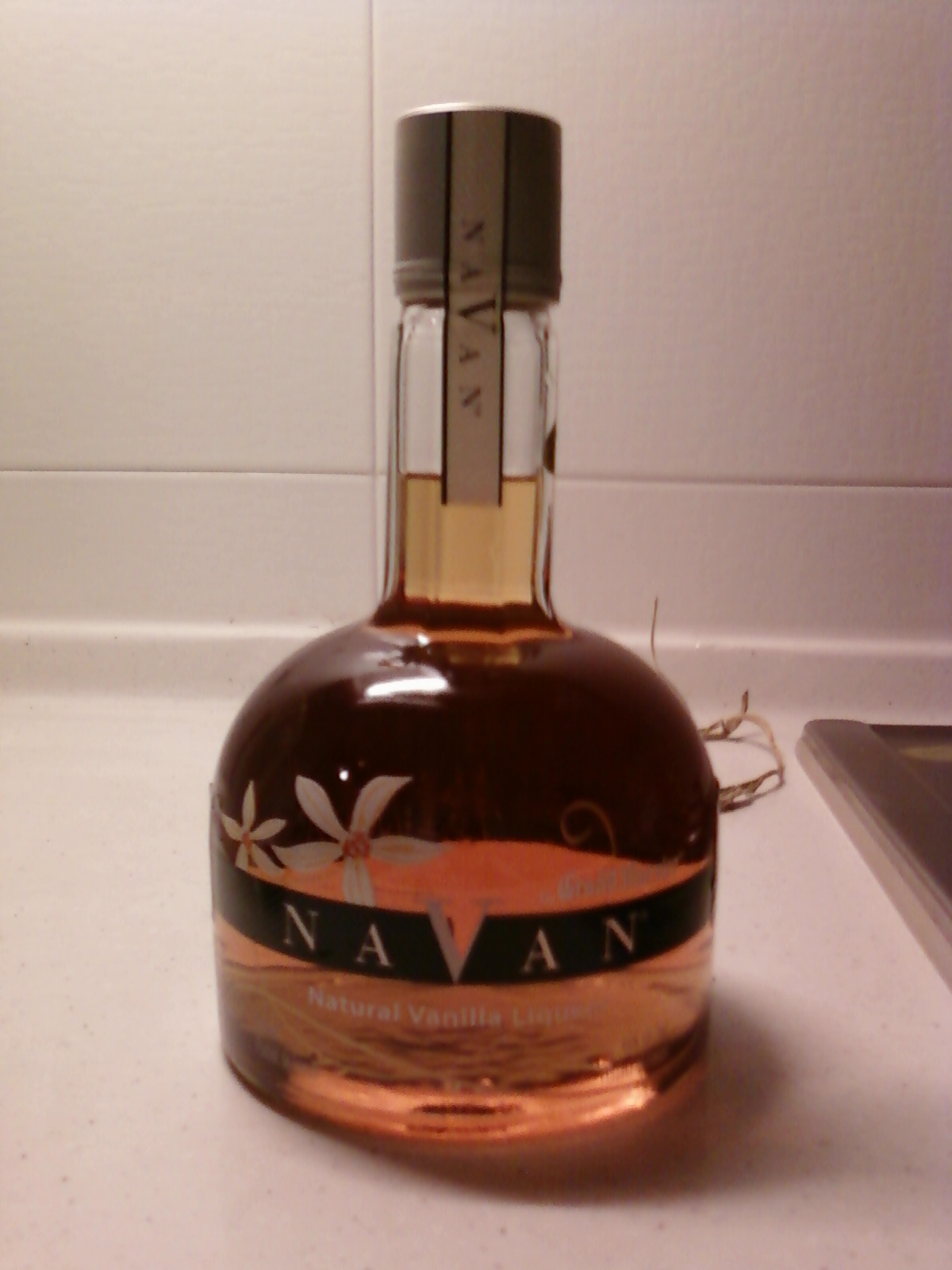
- Type: Liqueur
- Manufacturer: Alexandre Marnier-Lapostolle
- Origin: France
- Introduced: Fall 2004
- Alcohol by volume: 40%
- Proof (US): 80
- Colour: Medium- to pale-gold hue
- Flavor: vanilla

Navan (nah-váhn), is a vanilla liqueur produced by the House of Grand Marnier.

Navan's name stands for "Natural Vanilla". The vanilla beans are imported from Madagascar.

== History ==
Alexandra Marnier Lapostolle, current president of Marnier-Lapostolle North America and creator of Casa Lapostolle Wines, chose the natural vanilla flavor to create Navan, a new liqueur founded on Grand Marnier's success. Navan launched in 2004 in the US, where it is distributed by Moet Hennessy USA. It is also available in Canada and the Caribbean. In 2008 Navan introduced a revised, less sweet formula, based on feedback from bartenders and chefs.

By 2010, the Lapostolle family ceased making Navan. After repackaging and tweaking the formula, Navan did not sell the way the family had hoped.

== Production ==
When creating Navan, more than 150 eaux-de-vie from 500 distilleries are blended. Natural vanilla from Madagascar is flown to France where it is blended with fine French cognac that has been aged for up to 10 years. Once blended, Navan ages an additional six months.
