= GNRI Class BT =

Great Northern Railway of Ireland 4-4-0T steam locomotive class

Great Northern Railway Class BT
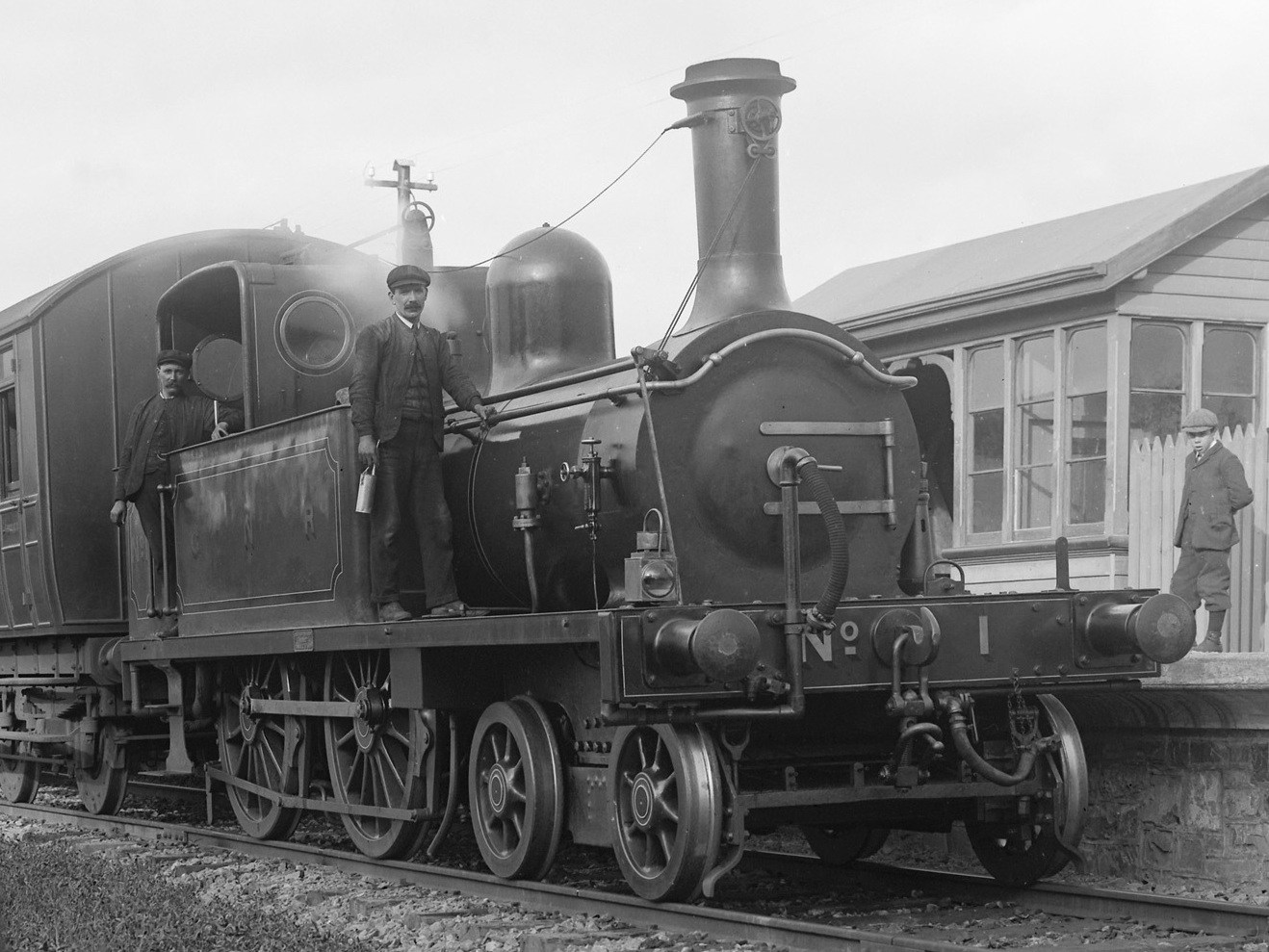
- BT No. 1 at Irish Street Halt, Armagh, 1909
Type and origin
- Power type: Steam
- Designer: J.C. Park
- Builder: Dundalk works
- Build date: 1887
- Total produced: 13
Specifications
- Configuration
  - Whyte: 4-4-0T
- Gauge: 5 ft 3 in (1,600 mm)
- Driver dia.: 4 ft 7 in (1,397 mm)
- Boiler pressure: 160 lbf/in^{2} (1,103.16 kPa)
- Cylinders: Two, inside
- Cylinder size: 15 in × 20 in (380 mm × 510 mm)
- Train heating: steam
Career
- Operators: GNR(I)
- Number in class: 13

Great Northern Railway Class BT were a class of 13 4-4-0T tank locomotives introduced by the GNR(I) from 1887. They were the Great Northern Railways first home built engine and therefore the first engine to be built in Dundalk works.

While fit for purpose when built, increasing train weights particularly with bogie carriages a factor meant by the 1920s they were underpowered for all available work and were withdrawn by 1921.
