= Castleblayney railway station =

Railway station in County Monaghan, Ireland

Castleblayney

General information
- Location: Castleblayney, County Monaghan; Ireland
- Coordinates: 54.12018°N 6.74073°W

History
- Original company: Dundalk and Enniskillen Railway
- Post-grouping: Great Northern Railway (Ireland)

Key dates
- 15 February 1849: Station opens
- 1 December 1910: Services to Armagh commence
- 2 April 1923: Services to Armagh cease
- 14 October 1957: Station closes to passengers
- 1 January 1960: Station closes completely
Location

Castleblayney railway station was on the Dundalk and Enniskillen Railway in the Republic of Ireland.

== History ==
The Dundalk and Enniskillen Railway opened the station on 17 July 1854. The Castleblayney, Keady and Armagh Railway extended their line from Keady to Castleblayney on 1 December 1910, connecting with Armagh, though the Partition of Ireland resulted in this extension closing on 2 April 1923.

The Irish North Western main line closed to passenger traffic on 14 October 1957 following the closure of most of the GNRI's cross-border lines, but survived for occasional goods and excursion traffic until 1 January 1960.

== Routes ==
Preceding station	Disused railways	Following station
Culloville	Dundalk and Enniskillen Railway; Dundalk to Enniskillen	Ballybay
Creaghanroe	Castleblayney, Keady and Armagh Railway; Armagh to Castleblayney	Terminus
