= Kingscourt railway station =

Railway station in County Cavan, Ireland

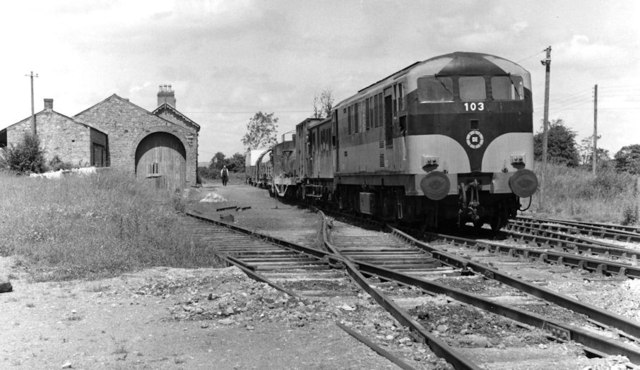
- Train in Kingscourt station (1976). Goods shed to the left, former passenger building behind it

General information
- Location: Kingscourt, County Cavan; Ireland
- Coordinates: 53°54′20.94″N 6°47′14.98″W
- Platforms: 1
- Tracks: 1

History
- Opened: 1875
- Closed: 2001
- Original company: Navan and Kingscourt Railway
- Pre-grouping: Midland Great Western Railway
- Post-grouping: Great Southern Railways

Key dates
- 1 November 1875: Station opens
- 27 January 1947: Station closes to passengers
- 30 October 2001: Goods service ends

Services
Preceding station	Disused railways	Following station
Kilmainham Wood	Midland Great Western Railway; Kingscourt branch line	Terminus
Location

Kingscourt railway station is a former railway station in Kingscourt, County Cavan, Ireland.

== History ==
The station was built in 1875 by the independent Navan and Kingscourt Railway, as the terminus of its line from Navan. In 1888, the company was purchased by the Midland Great Western Railway. The MGWR envisaged extending the line from Kingscourt to Cookstown via Carrickmacross, Castleblayney, Armagh and Dungannon, but this never materialised. (A line from Castleblayney to Armagh, via Keady, was eventually built in the early 1900s and operated by the Great Northern Railway (Ireland).)

On the night of 4 January 1923, during the Irish Civil War, a group of around 20 armed men raided the station, setting several coaches on fire. The men then knocked a local driver up and compelled him to run a standing goods train into a stationary engine, badly damaging both locomotives and the track they were on. Following this, the group took a quantity of wine from the goods store before leaving for Kilmainham Wood, where they proceeded to steal more groceries before being confronted by Free State troops; the armed men, having been warned by a sentry, managed to evade capture by escaping into the countryside, although without their stolen goods.

Following the creation of the Irish Free State, the MGWR became part of the Great Southern Railways in 1925, which in turn became part of Córas Iompair Éireann (CIÉ) in 1945. In 1947, CIÉ withdrew passenger services between Kingscourt and Navan. Goods services from Kingscourt to Dublin Port via Navan and Clonsilla were re-routed via Drogheda in 1958 and then largely withdrawn in 1963, following which the section to Navan was used almost exclusively for the transport of gypsum from a terminal adjacent to the station, owned and operated by BPB Gypsum Industries.

After a strike by Irish Rail staff in 2001, Gypsum Industries decided to transfer its traffic to road. The last gypsum train departed Kingscourt on 30 October 2001. The last train of all to operate to and from Kingscourt was a weed-spraying train on 7 June 2002, after which the line was disconnected at Tara Junction in Navan. The line was eventually lifted to create the Boyne Valley to Lakelands Greenway, which was completed in 2024.

The station building at Kingscourt remains intact today, having been partially restored in the mid-2000s. Also still extant are the station's single platform, the gypsum terminal and a goods shed.
