= Castleblayney, Keady and Armagh Railway =

Defunct railway between Counties Monaghan and Armagh, Ireland

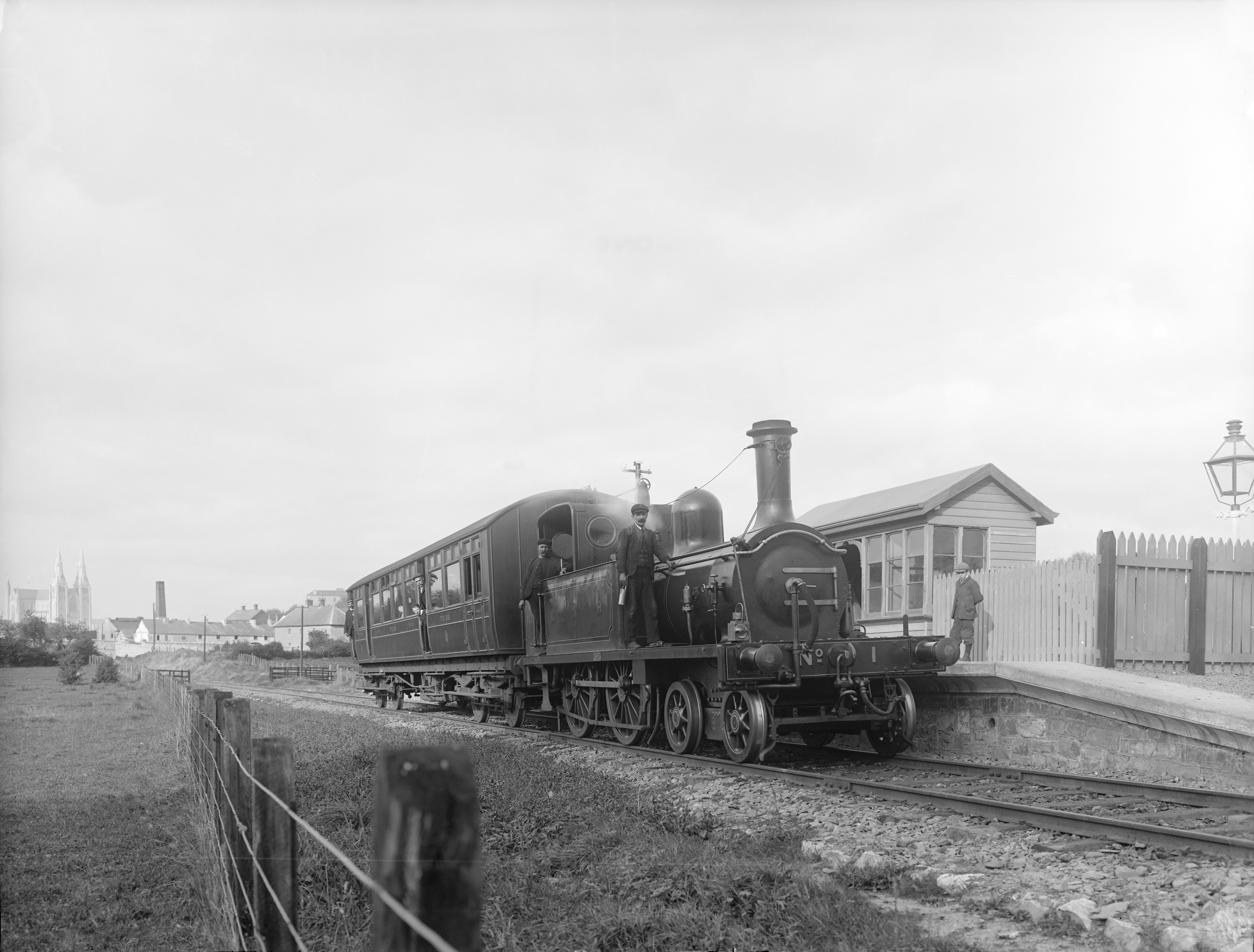
- Train at Irish Street Halt, Armagh. 1909
- Industry: Railway
- Founded: 1903
- Defunct: 1957
- Fate: taken over
- Successor: Great Northern Railway
- Headquarters: Ireland (later Northern Ireland)
- Area served: County Armagh, County Monaghan

The Castleblayney, Keady and Armagh Railway (CK&A) was an Irish gauge 5 ft 3 in (1,600 mm) railway in Ulster. It linked Armagh in County Armagh with Castleblayney in County Monaghan. The Armagh – Keady section was opened in 1909 and closed in 1957. The Castleblayney – Keady section was opened in 1910 and closed in 1924.

== History ==
In 1899 a bill was presented to Parliament to build a railway linking Kingscourt on the Midland Great Western Railway (MGW) with Armagh on the Great Northern Railway (GNR). It was defeated.

Kingscourt, Keady and Armagh Railway Act 1900
- Act of Parliament
- Parliament of the United Kingdom
- Long title: An Act to incorporate the Kingscourt Keady and Armagh Railway Company and to empower them to construct railways in the counties of Cavan Monaghan and Armagh and for other purposes.
- Citation: 63 & 64 Vict. c. ccxc

Dates
- Royal assent: 8 August 1900

Castleblayney Keady and Armagh Railway Act 1902
- Act of Parliament
- Parliament of the United Kingdom
- Long title: An Act to empower the Kingscourt Keady and Armagh Railway Company to construct a new railway in the county of Monaghan and to abandon a portion of their authorised railways to change the name of the Company to authorise the Great Northern Railway Company (Ireland) to work the undertaking of the Company and to subscribe towards their capital and for other purposes.
- Citation: 2 Edw. 7. c. cvi

Dates
- Royal assent: 28 April 1902

Castleblayney, Keady and Armagh Railway Act 1903
- Act of Parliament
- Parliament of the United Kingdom
- Long title: An Act to extend the time limited by the Kingscourt, Keady and Armagh Railway Act 1900 for the compulsory purchase of lands and for the construction of certain of the railways authorised by that Act and for other purposes.
- Citation: 3 Edw. 7. c. cxciv

Dates
- Royal assent: 11 August 1903

Text of statute as originally enacted

The next year Parliament passed the Kingscourt, Keady and Armagh Railway Act 1900 (63 & 64 Vict. c. ccxc) to incorporate the Kingscourt, Keady and Armagh Railway Company, but the new company was unable to begin construction. Instead it reached agreement with the GNR to build the 28-mile (45 km) section between Castleblayney and Armagh, and abandoned the planned section between Castleblayney and Kingscourt. The Castleblayney Keady and Armagh Railway Act 1902 (2 Edw. 7. c. cvi) reincorporated it as the Castleblayney, Keady and Armagh Railway Company.

Construction began in 1903; the first passenger services did not run until 31 May 1909, when the 10-mile (16 km) between Armagh and Keady was opened, although goods trains had started in March 1908. The 8-mile (13 km) section between Castleblayney and Keady was opened on 11 November 1910, and the GNR (which was working the line) took over the company on 1 June 1911 under the Great Northern Railway (Ireland) Act 1911 (1 & 2 Geo. 5. c. vi) The line attracted some freight but passenger traffic was light. Some passenger services were worked by a push–pull train formed of a single coach worked by a locomotive such as a BT class 4-4-0T dating from the 1880s. Freight trains were commonly worked by UG class 0-6-0s.

The Partition of Ireland in 1922 turned the Armagh–Monaghan county boundary between Creaghanroe and Carnagh into an international frontier that resulted in the GNR closing the Castleblaney – Keady section from 2 April 1923 (the customs border came into effect on Sunday 1 April) and withdrew passenger services from the Keady – Armagh section from 1 February 1932. In 1957 the Government of Northern Ireland made the GNR close much of its remaining network in Northern Ireland, including goods traffic from the remaining section of the CKA from 1 October 1957.

== Features ==
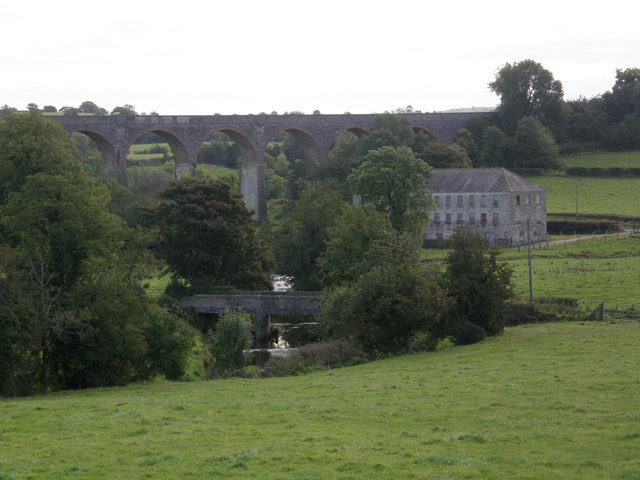
Tassagh Viaduct

The line's summit at Carnagh was 613 feet (187 m) above sea level, the highest place on the GNR.

The 570-foot (170 m)–long Tassagh Viaduct, north of Keady, is a composite. Its spandrels and parapets are stone, but its piers are reinforced concrete and the piers and the undersides of its 11 arches are faced with brick. This is a substantial saving in weight and construction compared with earlier purely stone or brick viaducts. The viaduct over the Callan River at Ballyards, by contrast, is faced entirely with stone.

== Sources ==
- Arnold, Robert McCullough (1980). The Golden Years of the Great Northern Railway. Belfast: Blackstaff Press.
- Baker, Michael H.C. (1972). Irish Railways since 1916. London: Ian Allan. pp. 46, 66. ISBN 0-7110-0282-7.
- Ferris, Tom (2003). The Great Northern Railway. An Irish Railway Pictorial. Leicester: Midland Publishing. pp. 9, 84. ISBN 1-85780-169-5.
- McCutcheon, Alan (1969). Ireland. Railway History in Pictures. Vol. 1. Newton Abbott: David & Charles. p. 56. ISBN 0-7153-4651-2.
- McCutcheon, Alan (1970). Ireland. Railway History in Pictures. Vol. 2. Newton Abbott: David & Charles. pp. 43, 72. ISBN 0-7153-4998-8.
- McCutcheon, William Alan (1983) [1980]. The Industrial Archaeology of Northern Ireland. Madison, NJ: Fairleigh Dickinson University Press for the Northern Ireland Department of the Environment. ISBN 0-8386-3125-8.
