= Drogheda MacBride railway station =

Station in County Louth, Ireland

Drogheda MacBride Stáisiún Mhic Ghiolla Bhríde
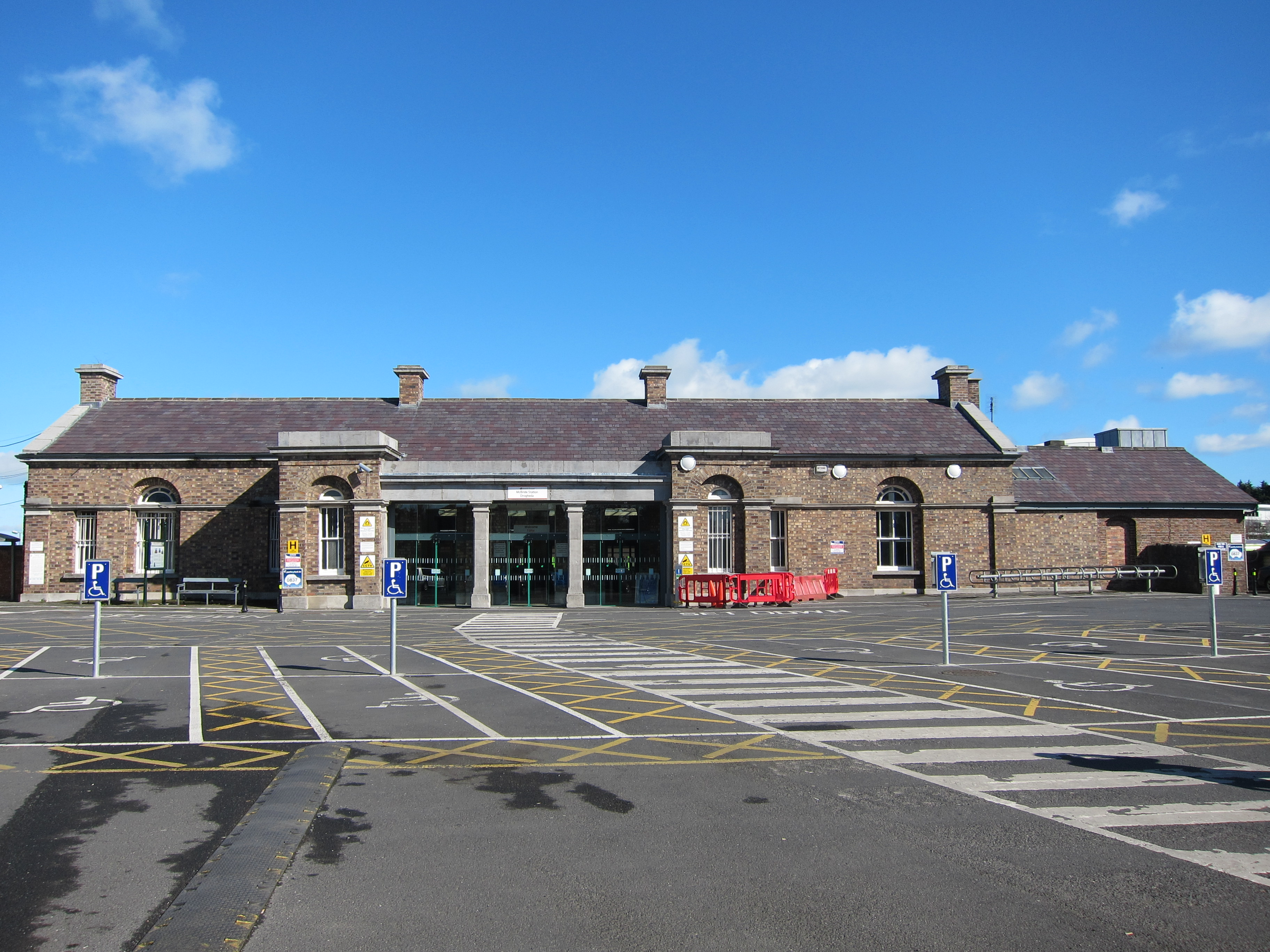
- Exterior of Drogheda railway station

General information
- Location: Dublin Road, Drogheda; County Louth; Ireland
- Coordinates: 53.7119°N 6.333°W
- Owner: Iarnród Éireann
- Transit authority: TFI
- Line: Dublin–Belfast
- Distance: Belfast Lanyon Place: 81¾ Miles; Dublin Connolly: 33¾ miles
- Platforms: 3
- Tracks: 3 (at platforms); 13 (total)
- Train operators: Iarnród Éireann, NI Railways
- Bus operators: Bus Eireann; TFI Local Link
- Connections: 101; 101X; 163; D4; D5

Construction
- Structure type: At-grade
- Parking: Yes
- Cycle facilities: Yes

Other information
- Station code: IÉ: DGHDA; NIR: DG
- Fare zone: D

History
- Opened: 1844

Services
Enterprise
Northern Commuter
Preceding station	Iarnród Éireann	Following station
Dublin Connolly Terminus	Enterprise	Dundalk Clarke towards Belfast Grand Central
Laytown towards Dublin Connolly or Grand Canal Dock	Commuter Northern Commuter	Dundalk Clarke Terminus
Laytown towards Dublin Connolly or Grand Canal Dock	Commuter Northern Commuter	Terminus
Former services
Preceding station	Disused railways	Following station
Terminus	Great Northern Railway (Ireland); Drogheda-Oldcastle	Duleek
Laytown	Great Northern Railway (Ireland); Dublin-Dundalk (Line Open)	Dunleer; Line open, station closed
Future services
Preceding station	Future services	Following station
Laytown	DART+ Coastal North	Terminus
Location

Drogheda MacBride railway station (Irish: Stáisiún Mhic Ghiolla Bhríde, Droichead Átha) is a railway station that serves Drogheda in County Louth, Ireland.

== Description ==
The present station is located on a sharp curve on the southern approach to the Boyne Viaduct. Formerly there were three lines through the station, but when the station was refurbished in 1997, the up platform line was removed and the platform was widened.

It was given the name MacBride on 10 April 1966 in commemoration of John MacBride, one of the executed leaders of the Easter Rising of 1916.

== History ==
The original Drogheda station, on the Dublin and Drogheda Railway line, opened on 26 May 1844. It was located about a quarter-mile southeast of the current station. The passenger station was re-sited when the first temporary Boyne Viaduct opened on 11 May 1853. The original station site became "Buckey's sidings", and has been the location of the railcar depot since 2000.

The former Great Northern Railway (Ireland) branch to Oldcastle (opened in parts from 1850 to 1863) diverges from the Dublin-Belfast line immediately south of the station. This serves Irish Cement at Drogheda and Tara Mine near Navan.

The station is planned to be the terminus of the DART+ Coastal North project, which aims to bring improvements to the line between Dublin Connolly and Drogheda, including electrification north of Malahide; battery-charging infrastructure will be installed in the interim. As part of the plans, a new platform is also planned to be constructed on the Navan branch. The Railway Order for DART+ Coastal North was approved by An Coimisiún Pleanála in August 2025, allowing the project to progress to procurement and detailed design.

== Gallery ==
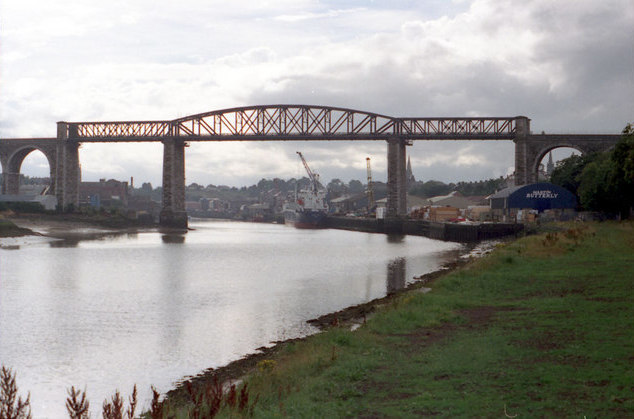
The Boyne Viaduct carries rail traffic across the River Boyne

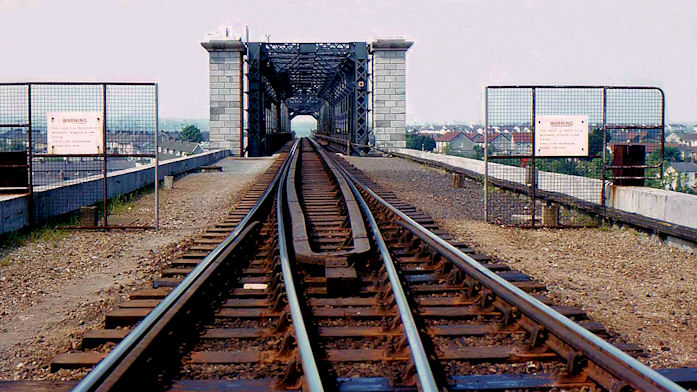
View heading north across the Boyne Viaduct

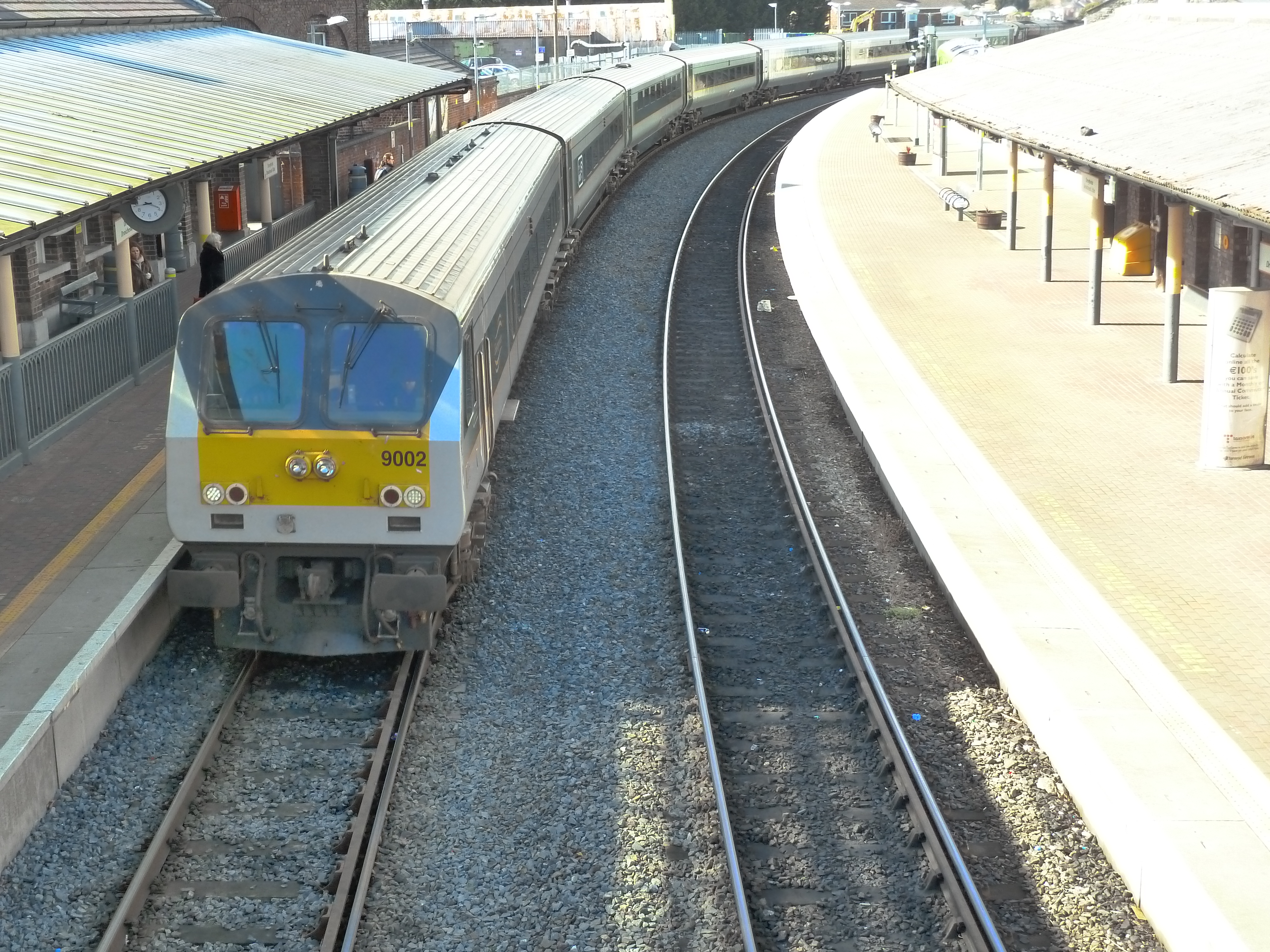
The Belfast - Dublin Enterprise pulling into Drogheda station.

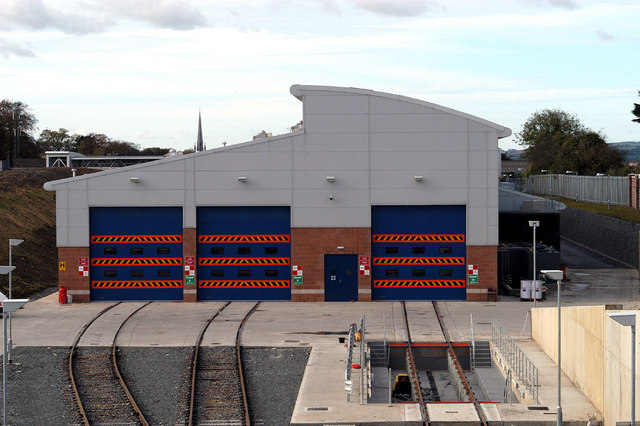
Drogheda Commuter Railcar Service Depot

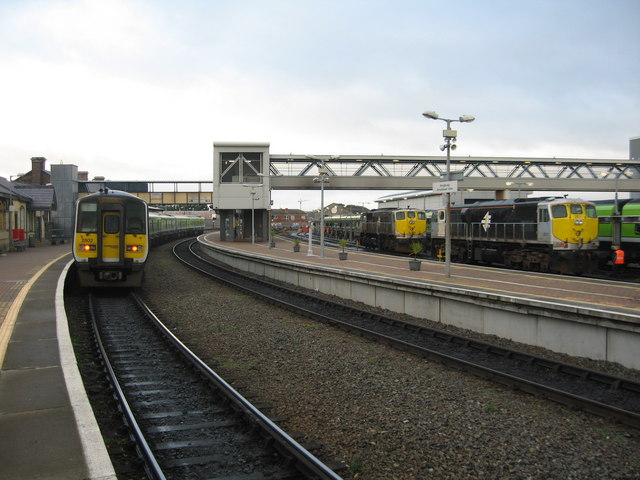
Railcar and locomotives at Drogheda station

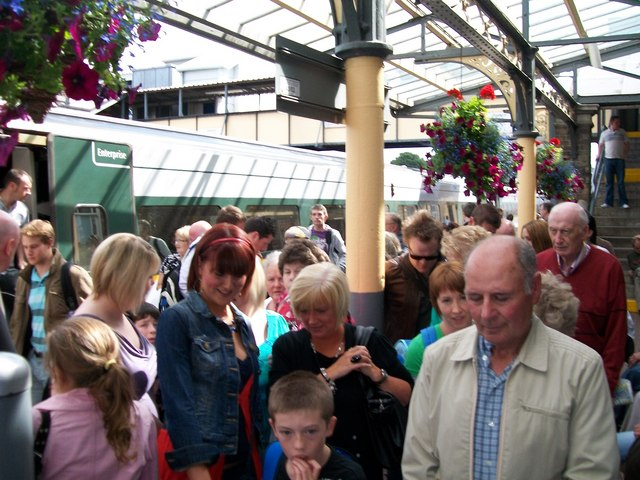
Train passengers disembarking at Drogheda Station

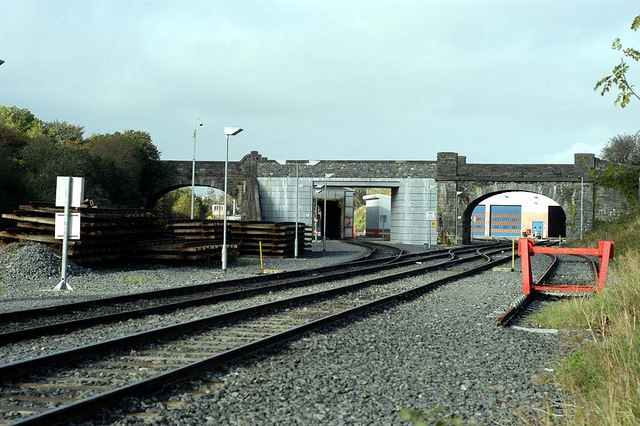
McGrath's Bridge, Drogheda McGrath's Bridge, Under the lefthand arch is the Dublin to Belfast mainline, the centre arch leads to the carriage wash shed, on the right, leads to the DMU Servicing depot.

== See also ==
- List of railway stations in Ireland
