= Rail Users Ireland =

Advocacy group in Ireland

Rail Users Ireland (previously Platform 11) is an Irish rail transport pressure group which advocates for the expansion of rail transport routes and services in Ireland. Through press releases, lobbying and leafleting, the group has promoted a number of rail projects. As of 2023, the group was a member of the European Passengers' Federation - a European level representative body.

== History ==
Platform 11 was founded in January 2003 at a public meeting held in Dublin. The group, which was renamed Rail Users Ireland in 2007, has advocated for expanded commuter services in the Greater Dublin Area and for suburban rail services in Galway and Limerick. They have also advocated for bus services connecting to railheads where rail is not feasible.
