= Ardee (disambiguation) =

Ardee is a town in County Louth, Ireland.

Ardee may also refer to:

- Ardee (barony), containing the Irish town
- Ardee (Parliament of Ireland constituency)
- SS Ardee, a steamship
- Ardee, Tennessee, a ghost town in the United States
- Ardee railway station, a former station in the Irish town
- Ardee RFC, a rugby union team in the Irish town

== See also ==
- ArrDee, a British rapper
