= Castlebellingham railway station =

Railway station in County Louth, Ireland

Castlebellingham
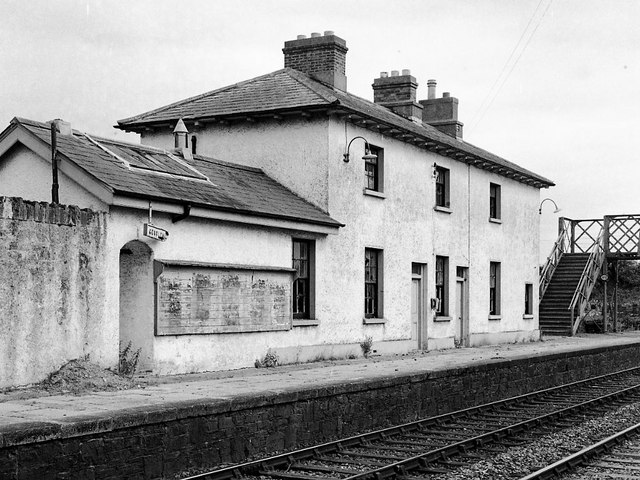
- The station shortly after it was abandoned

General information
- Location: Station Rd, R166; Castlebellingham, County Louth; Ireland
- Coordinates: 53.903°N 6.419°W
- Line: Dublin to Belfast
- Platforms: 2
- Tracks: 2

History
- Opened: 1 April 1851
- Closed: 2 December 1974 (goods); 6 September 1976 (passengers)

Services
Preceding station	Disused railways	Following station
Dundalk Clarke	Córas Iompair Éireann; Dublin-Dundalk	Drogheda MacBride
Dundalk Clarke	Great Northern Railway (Ireland); Dublin-Dundalk	Dromin Junction
Location

Castlebellingham railway station served the village of Castlebellingham on the Dublin to Belfast railway line between Drogheda railway station and Dundalk railway station. It was north of where the line branched to Ardee. The station opened on 1 April 1851, closed to goods on 2 December 1974 and was finally closed on 6 September 1976.

Proposals were made by businessman Larry Goodman in January 2009 that included reopening the station.
