= Dromin Junction railway station =

Railway station in Ireland

Dromin Junction railway station was a railway station serving the junction between the Dublin-Belfast mainline and a short lived branch line serving the town of Ardee, County Louth, in Ireland.

Opened in 1896 by the Great Northern Railway of Ireland (G.N.R.) it extended some 7.2 kilometres (4.5 mi) westward from the Dublin-Belfast mainline. It had one intermediate halt, at Stickillen, and a large freight handling yard at Ardee.

Never very prosperous, it suffered, like many branches, with the onset of the private motor car, and bus, and passenger rail services were withdrawn in 1934, although the occasional special served the line from time to time, there was never a regular passenger timetable on the line after that. Dromin Junction Station itself closed to rail passengers in 1955, but it remained in operation for rail staff to manage the Ardee line.

However, it continued to be used for freight transport, and this continued up until the early 1970s. With rail out of favour with the government of the day, Córas Iompair Éireann (C.I.E.) phased out the freight service on the line, the last service being a special in October 1975.

The line was closed to all traffic in November 1975, and was disconnected from the mainline within a few years, although the official Abandonment Order was not effected until 1987. The rail tracks were lifted in the same year, and were still in good condition, having remained in situ since disconnection from the mainline.

Today, little evidence remains of 'The Junction' although the trackbed itself has been largely retained, and is now a public cross-country walking track.

The junction itself has been severed from the former branch by the Dublin-Belfast M1 Motorway, which cut through the trackbed in 2001.

Preceding station	Disused railways	Following station
Castlebellingham	Great Northern Railway (Ireland); Dublin-Dundalk	Dunleer
Terminus	Great Northern Railway (Ireland); Ardee branch line	Ardee
