= Ardee, Tennessee =

Coordinates: 36.5431051°N 87.6264044°W

Ardee is a ghost town in Stewart County, in the U.S. state of Tennessee.

== History ==
The community was perhaps named after Ardee, in Ireland.
