= Dundalk Clarke railway station =

Railway station in County Louth, Ireland

Dundalk Clarke Stáisiún Uí Chléirigh Dún Dealgan
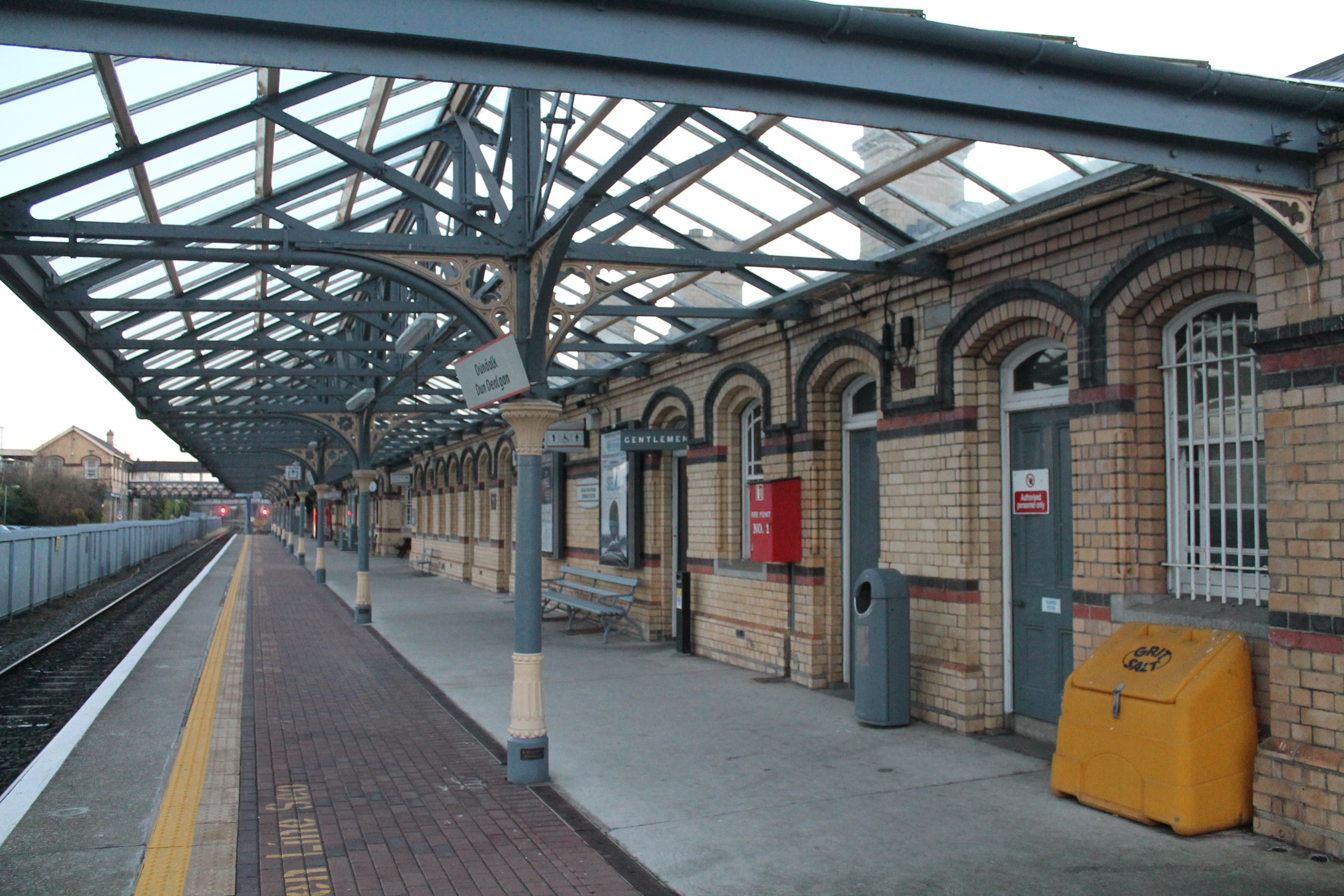
- Dundalk Clarke railway station platform

General information
- Location: Carrickmacross Road, Dundalk, County Louth; Ireland
- Coordinates: 54.002°N 6.413°W
- Owner: Iarnród Éireann
- Transit authority: TFI
- Line: Dublin–Belfast
- Platforms: 3
- Tracks: 3 (at platforms); 8 (total)
- Train operators: Iarnród Éireann, NI Railways
- Bus routes: 4
- Bus operators: Bus Eireann; Halpenny Travel; TFI Local Link
- Connections: 169; 170; 171; 918

Construction
- Structure type: At-grade
- Platform levels: 2
- Parking: Yes
- Accessible: Yes

Other information
- Station code: IÉ: DDALK; NIR: DK
- Fare zone: E
- Website: irishrail.ie/en-ie/Station/Dundalk-Clarke

History
- Opened: 15 February 1849; 177 years ago

Key dates
- 1849: Dundalk Junction opened
- 1894: Dundalk Junct. Station closed
- 1894: Dundalk opened
- 1966: Renamed as Dundalk Clarke Station

Services
Preceding station	Iarnród Éireann	Following station
Drogheda MacBride towards Dublin Connolly	Enterprise	Newry towards Belfast Grand Central
Drogheda MacBride towards Dublin Connolly or Grand Canal Dock	Commuter Northern Commuter	Terminus
Former services
Preceding station	Former services	Following station
Drogheda MacBride; Line and station open	Commuter; Northern Commuter (Until 2024, 1 train per day in each direction)	Newry; Line and station open
Historical railways
Preceding station	Historical railways	Following station
Dunleer; Line open, station closed	Córas Iompair Éireann; Dublin–Dundalk	Terminus
Castlebellingham; Line open, station closed	Great Northern Railway (Ireland); Dublin–Dundalk	Terminus
Castlebellingham; Line open, station closed	Great Northern Railway (Ireland); Belfast–Dublin (1876–1887)	Mountpleasant; Line open, station closed
Castlebellingham; Line open, station closed	Great Northern Railway (Ireland); Belfast–Dublin (1892–1933)	Adavoyle; Line open, station closed
Terminus	Great Northern Railway (Ireland); Dundalk–Enniskillen	Kellybridge Halt; Line and station closed
Terminus	Dundalk and Enniskillen Railway; Dundalk–Enniskillen	Inniskeen; Line and station closed
Terminus	Dundalk and Enniskillen Railway; Dundalk–Enniskillen connection	Dundalk Barrack Street; Station and railway facilities closed
Terminus	Dundalk, Newry and Greenore Railway; Dundalk–Greenore (1873–1951)	Dundalk Quay Street; Line and station closed
Route map
Location
- Location within island of Ireland

Dundalk Clarke railway station (Irish: Stáisiún Uí Chléirigh Dún Dealgan) serves Dundalk in County Louth, Ireland.

It consists of an island platform, with a bay facing south. It is served by the Dublin-Belfast Enterprise intercity trains as well as local Commuter services to and from Dublin. There is a small museum located in one of the station buildings, displaying various railway artefacts and photographs.

== History ==
=== Early days ===
The original station, known as Dundalk Junction, opened on 15 February 1849. It was so named because it served as the junction between the Dublin & Belfast Junction Railway and the Dundalk & Enniskillen Railway, which operated between Dundalk and Castleblayney before being extended to Clones, Enniskillen, and Cavan. This station, located south of the current one, was designed by Sir John MacNeill. The Dundalk & Enniskillen Railway line originally terminated at Quay Street and crossed the Belfast line on the level at a location known as Dundalk Square Crossing.

=== Great Northern Railway and a new station ===
In 1875, the Dublin & Belfast Junction Railway merged with the Dublin & Drogheda Railway, and the following year, it combined with the Irish North Western Railway and the Ulster Railway to form the Great Northern Railway (Ireland) (GNR). The current Dundalk Clarke station was built in June 1894 and designed by William Hamilton Mills, featuring his signature polychromatic brick style, predominantly in yellow, which is also found in stations like Lisburn, Malahide, and Howth.

With the partition of Ireland in 1921, customs controls were introduced at Dundalk for cross-border routes operated by the GNR. A police station was created on the platform, and people suspected of smuggling goods were stopped for questioning and detained. The railway also played a role in tourism and commuter transport, with services such as the Bundoran Express linking Dublin with the Donegal resort town via Dundalk.

=== Dundalk, Newry & Greenore Railway ===
In 1873, the Dundalk, Newry & Greenore Railway was established, operating from Quay Street station. It was run by the London & North Western Railway (LNWR), which influenced the locomotives, rolling stock, and station architecture. The line was absorbed into the London Midland & Scottish Railway (LMS) in 1922 and later managed by the GNR in 1933. Services ceased in 1951, though rolling stock retained LNWR colors long after they had disappeared from English tracks. One of these historic carriages is preserved at the Ulster Transport Museum in Cultra.

=== End of the Great Northern Railway ===
The GNR's financial struggles led to government control in 1952 with the formation of the Great Northern Railway Board (GNR(B)), jointly overseen by the Dublin and Stormont governments. Passenger services to Enniskillen ceased in 1957, while freight continued to Clones until 1960, with the last freight operations from Barrack Street Yard lasting until 1995.

In 1958, the GNR(B) was disbanded, and its assets were divided between Córas Iompair Éireann (CIÉ) in the Republic and the Ulster Transport Authority (UTA) in Northern Ireland. This led to the peculiar arrangement where locomotives were swapped at Dundalk for cross-border operations.

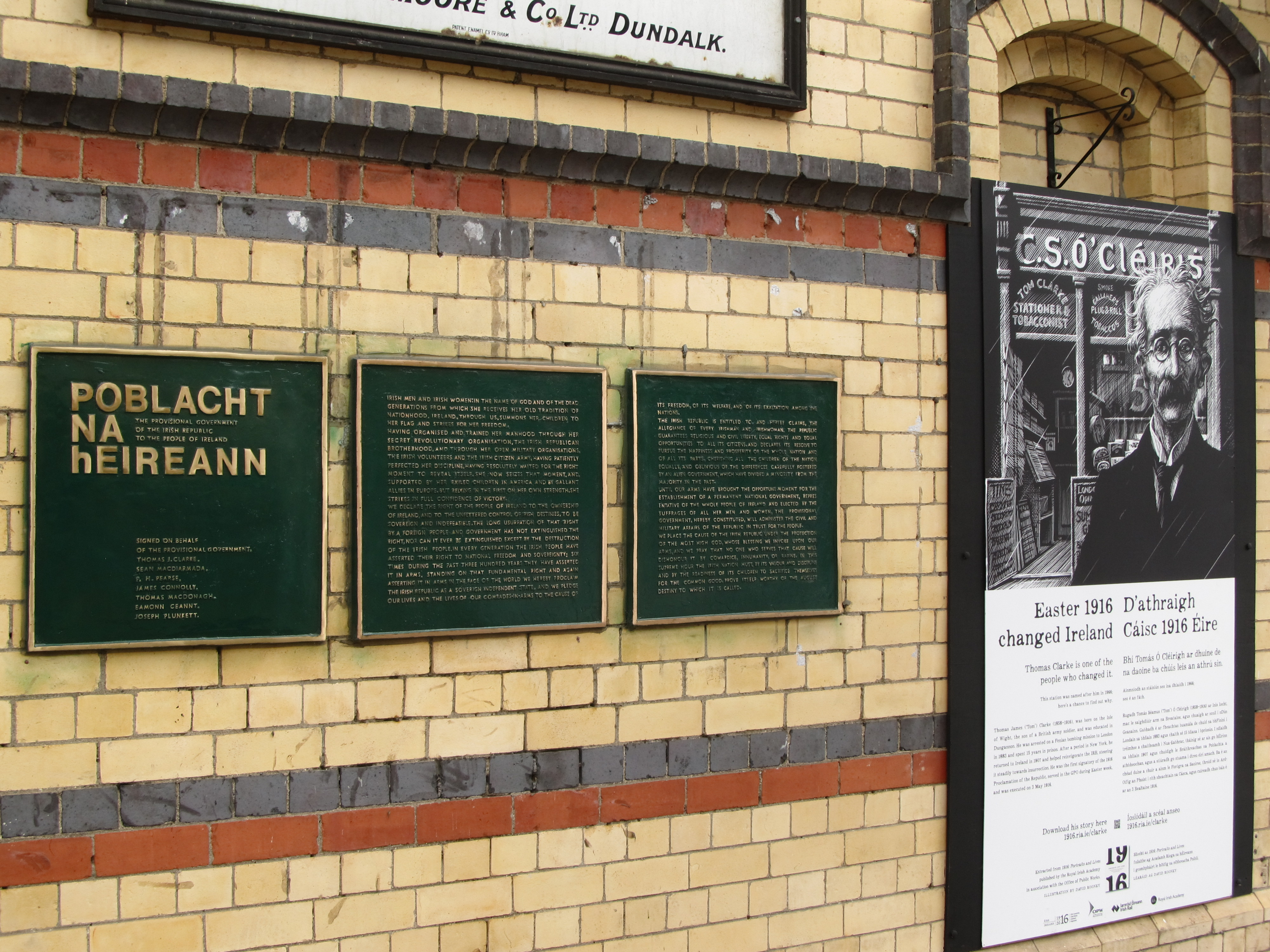
Memorial to the Easter Rising leader Tom Clarke in the Station

On 10 April 1966, as part of the 50th anniversary of the Easter Rising, the station was renamed "Dundalk Clarke Station" in honor of executed Rising leader Thomas Clarke.

=== Modern developments ===
CIÉ was reorganised in 1987 into separate operational entities, with Dundalk Clarke station coming under Iarnród Éireann. In January, 1995 Iarnród Eireann announced the closure of their goods yard in Barrack Street and all goods traffic would be re-located to a new £2.5m depot on the old Irish North line alignment on the Ardee Road. After this freight traffic, particularly for the Harp Brewery, was reduced significantly and in the mid-2000s, Dundalk became a passenger-only station. Which left the new freight depot abandoned and disused.

In 1996, during a renovation of the station, the track layout was simplified, leading to the removal of the sidings on the downside (line from Newry heading to Dublin), which were subsequently converted into a car park.

On 31 July 2024, the "All-Island Rail Review" was launched at Dundalk Station by Transport Minister Eamon Ryan and Northern Ireland Infrastructure Minister John O'Dowd.

== Design ==
Dundalk Clarke railway station was designed by the first chief engineer of the Great Northern Railway, William Hemingway Mills. Known for its polychromatic brickwork featuring Italianate and Spanish stylistic influences, the station has a lattice-style footbridge connecting the elevated ticket office to the island platform below. Historically, sliding windows in the Victorian walkway let ticket office staff have direct communication with the platform and trains below.

At road level, the station houses the ticket office and waiting area, while the main station resides beneath at track level. These areas are connected by a Victorian-era covered walkway and a 21st-century lift for accessibility. The station's combination of iron, glass, and brickwork has led to it being described, by Archiseek.com, as the "finest station on the main Belfast–Dublin line".

The island platform, constructed using granolithic concrete supplied by Stewart's of Glasgow, mirrors the material's application on London streets.

== GNR Railway Works ==
Dundalk was home to the GNR’s major engineering works, responsible for maintaining and rebuilding locomotives, carriages, wagons, and road vehicles. One of its key innovations was the railbus, designed by works managers George Howden and R.W. Meredith, featuring a unique steel-and-rubber wheel design.

After the GNR(B) was dissolved, much of the engineering facility was taken over by the Dundalk Engineering Company, which produced Heinkel Bubble Cars in the 1960s. The site also built steam heat generator vans for CIÉ using imported Dutch components, leading to them being called both "Dutch vans" and "Dundalk vans." Parts of the former depot are now used by Bus Éireann.

== Operations ==
=== Rail services ===
The station is served by Northern Commuter and Enterprise services, with destinations to Belfast Grand Central, Grand Canal Dock, Portadown, Dublin Connolly, and Drogheda MacBride.

=== Bus services ===
Bus routes 169, 170, 171, and 918 serve the station from the road outside the station gate, with destinations including Carrickmacross, Inniskeen, Cavan, Shercock, and Dundalk Bus Station.

== Gallery ==
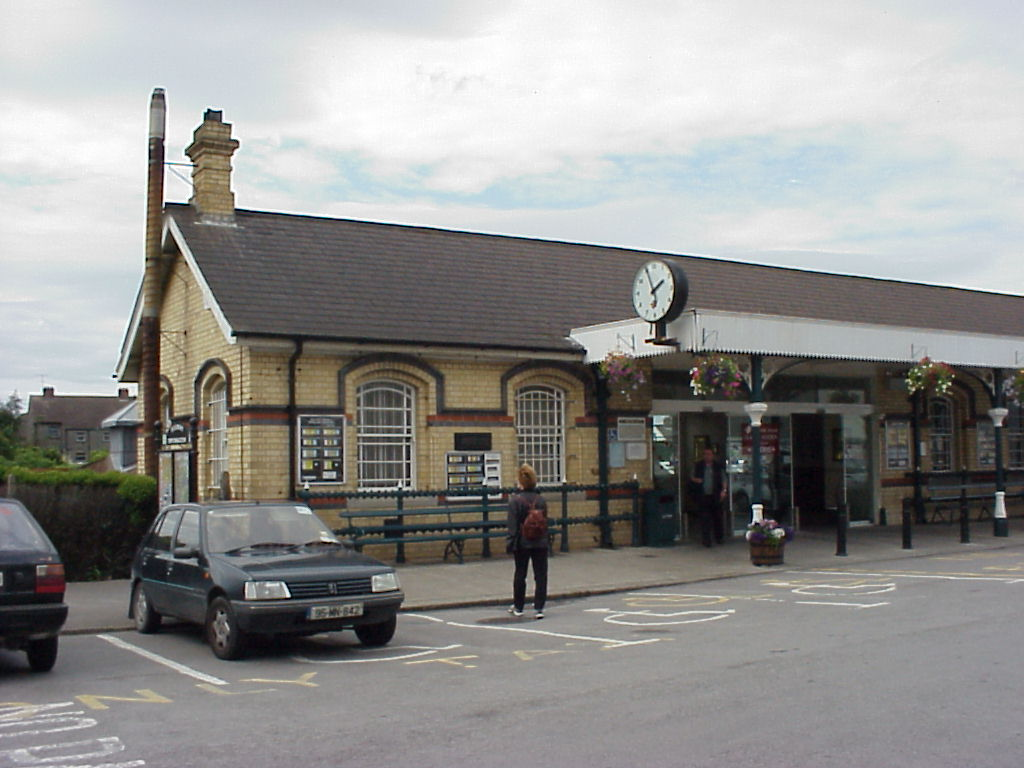
Station exterior

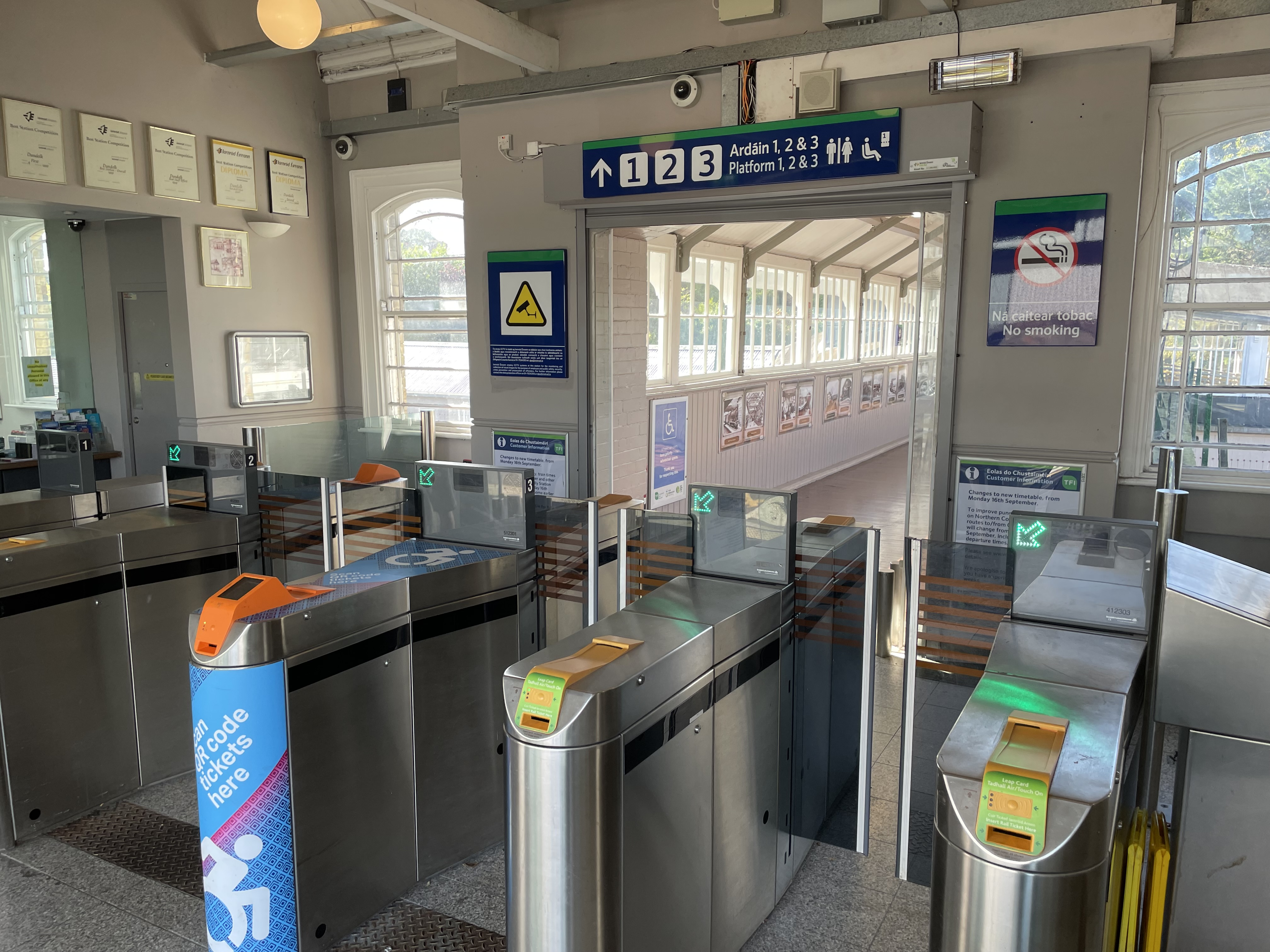
Ticket barriers in the main building

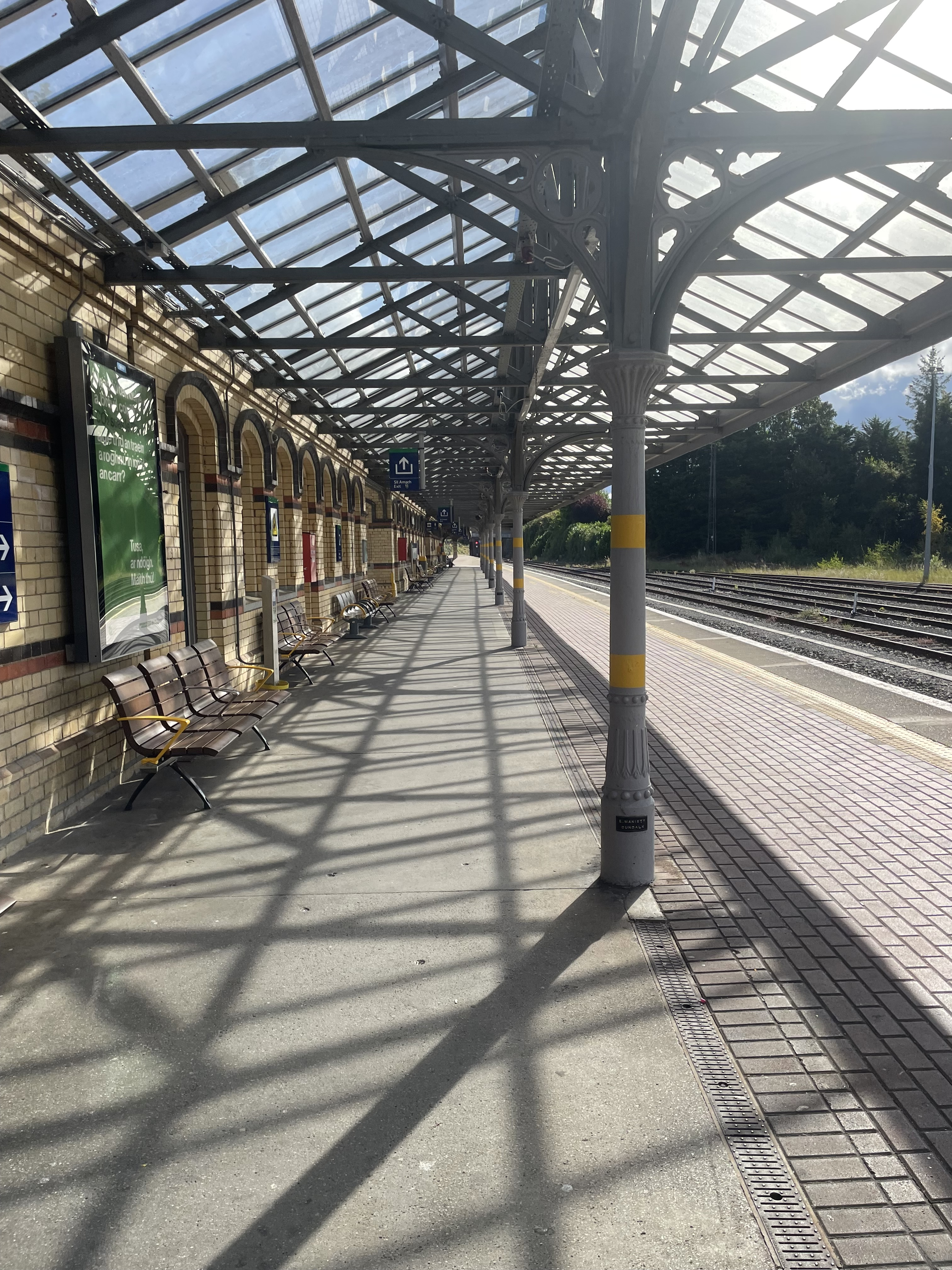
View to the south from Platform 2

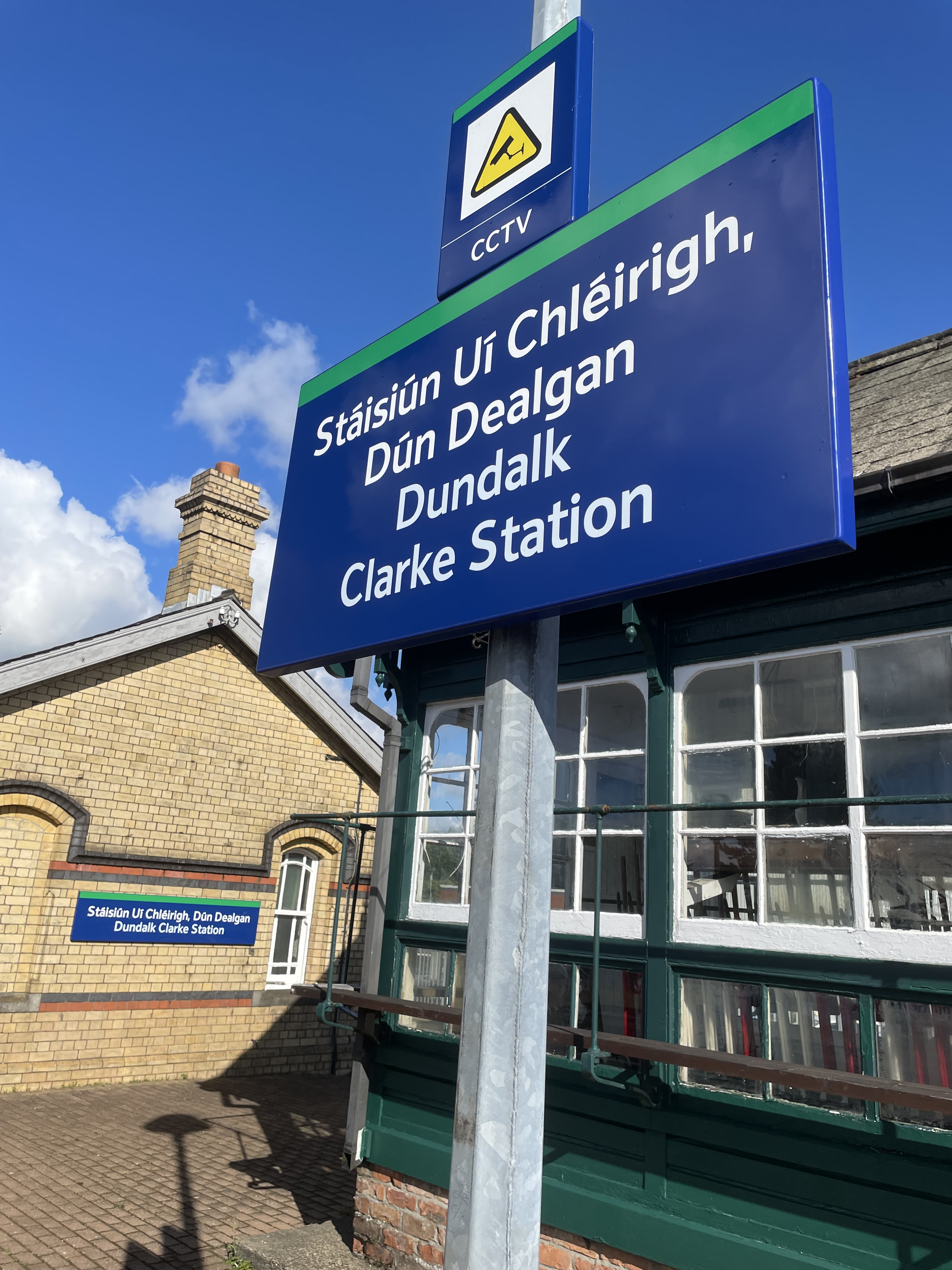
Platform 2 station name board

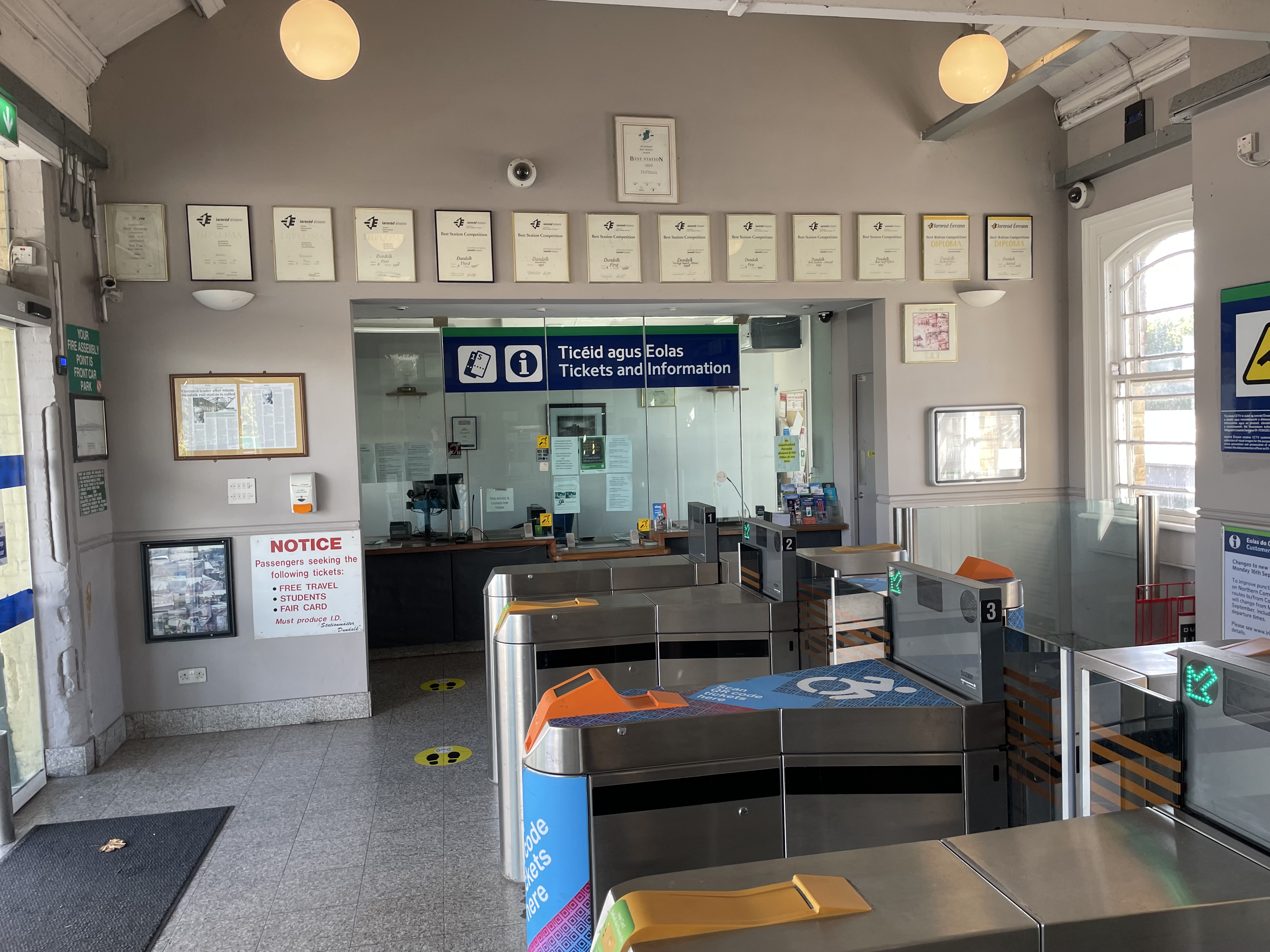
Staffed ticket office in the main building

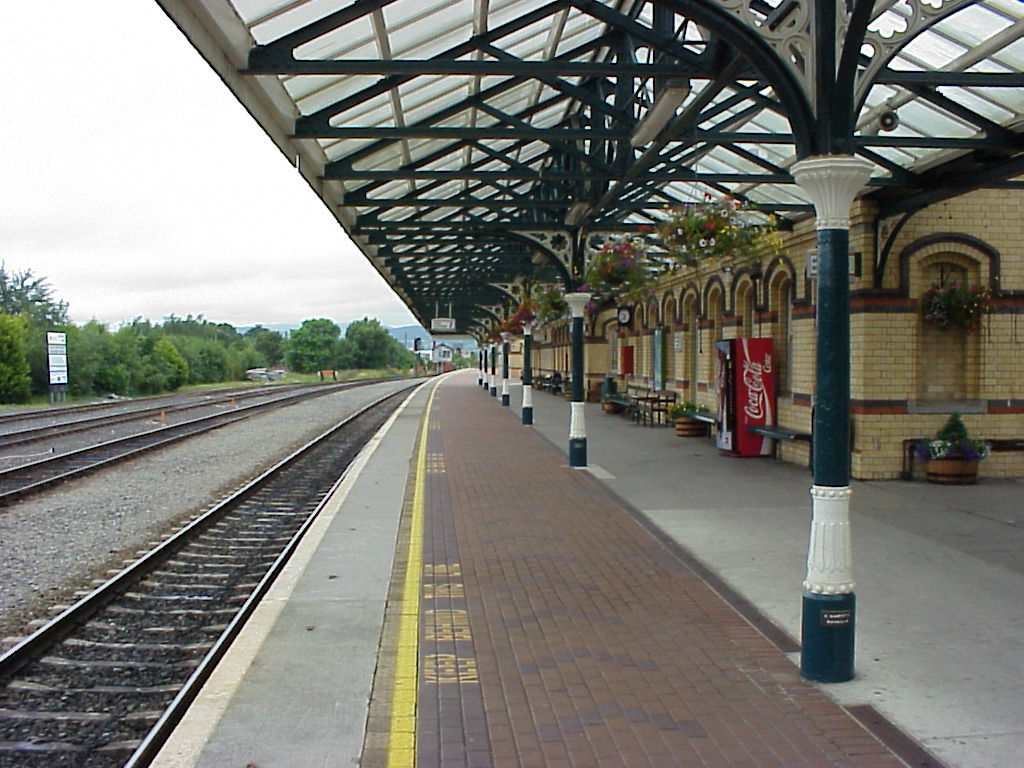
The up platform

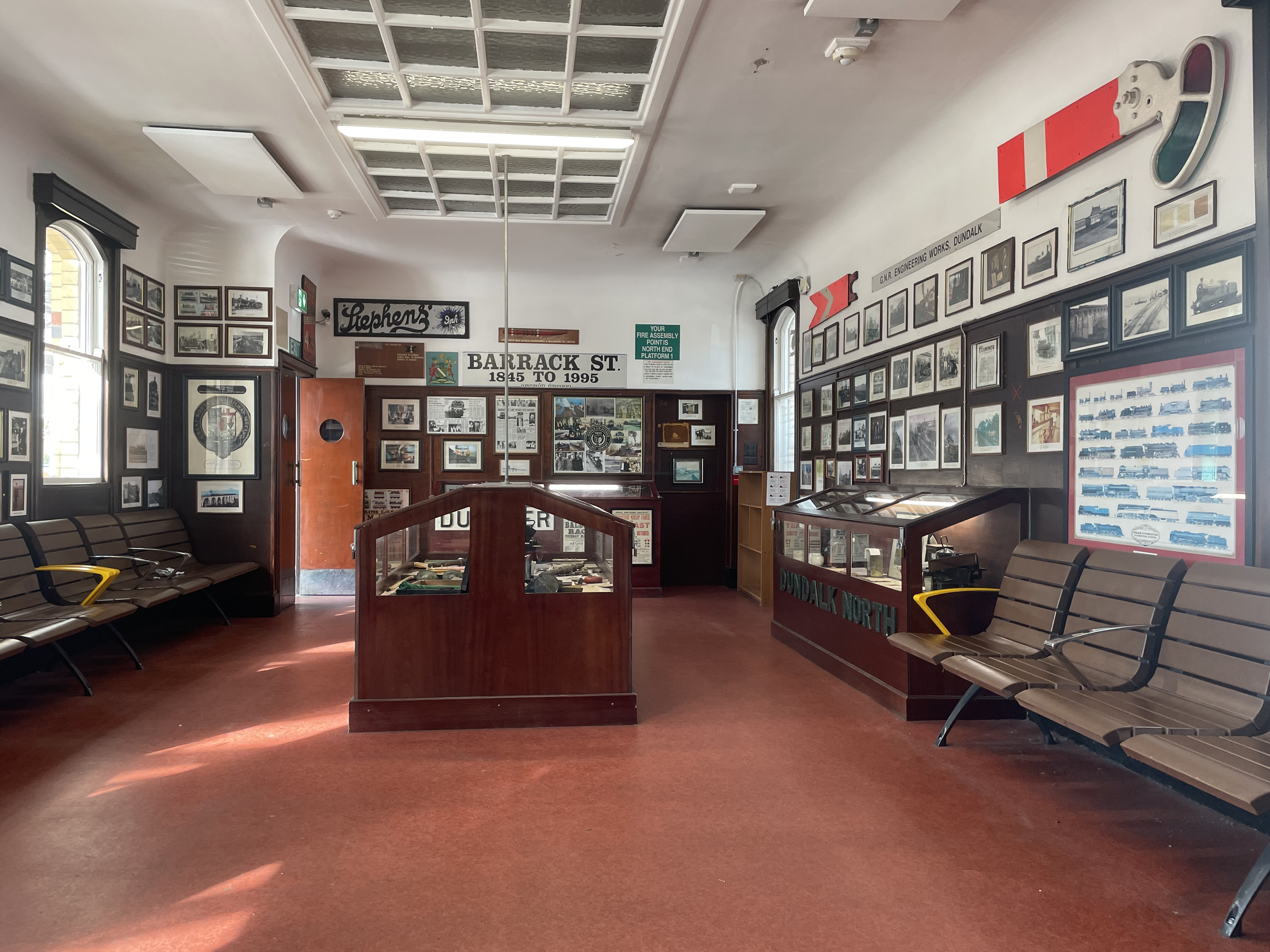
Museum in Dundalk Clarke station

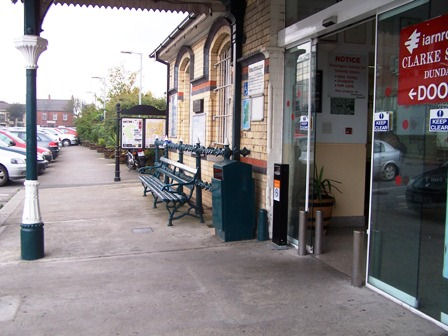
Entrance

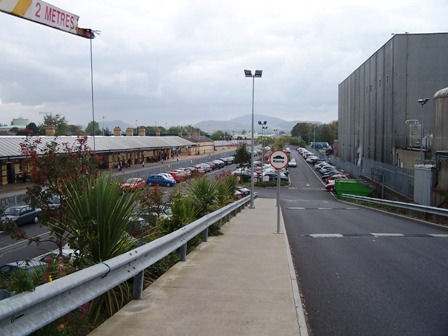
Station car park

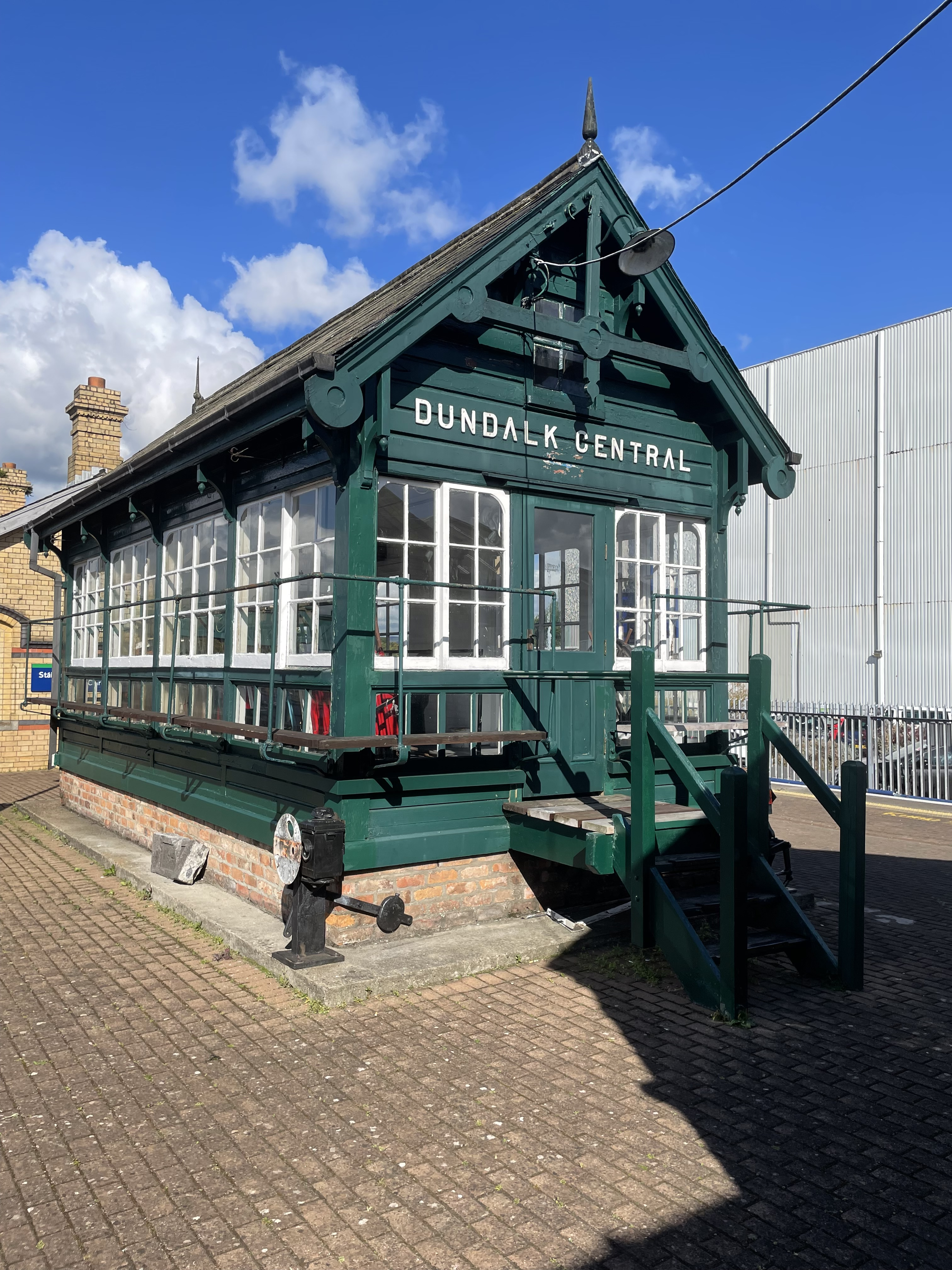
Old Dundalk Central signal cabin

== See also ==
- List of railway stations in Ireland
- Great Northern Railway of Ireland
