= Dunleer railway station =

Disused station in County Louth, Ireland

Dunleer Dún Léire
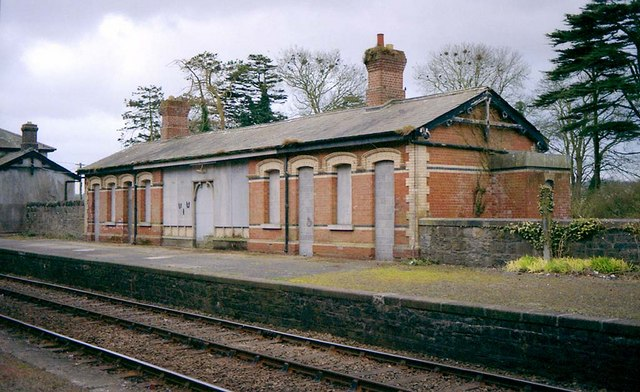
- Dunleer station and platform on the Belfast-Dublin Line

General information
- Location: Dunleer; Ireland
- Coordinates: 53.8313°N 6.3915°W
- Owner: Iarnród Éireann
- Operator: Iarnród Éireann
- Platforms: 1
- Tracks: 2

Construction
- Structure type: At-grade

History
- Opened: 1849
- Closed: 1984
Location

Dunleer railway station is a disused railway station on the Dublin-Belfast railway line in Dunleer, County Louth Ireland. Opened by the Dublin and Belfast Junction Railway in 1851, the station was the major stop between Dundalk and Drogheda. The station survived longer than most following the rationalisation of the railway network, until it was closed by Córas Iompair Éireann in 1984.

In the late 20th century, Dunleer's population expanded and it "developed into a local transport hub". As of 2010, the local Dunleer Community Development Board were calling for the railway station to be reopened. While the possibility of the station being rebuilt was referenced in local development plans published in 2009 by Louth County Council, as of 2021 the National Transport Authority reportedly had "no plans" for a station at Dunleer.

Preceding station	Disused railways	Following station
Dundalk Clarke	Córas Iompair Éireann; Dublin-Dundalk	Drogheda MacBride
Dromin Junction	Great Northern Railway (Ireland); Dublin-Dundalk	Drogheda

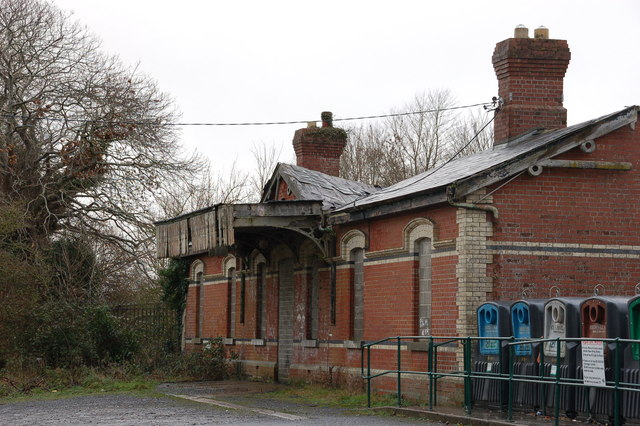
Disused Dunleer station building
