= Ardee railway station =

Abandoned railway station in Ardee, County Louth, Ireland

Ardee Baile Átha Fhirdhia
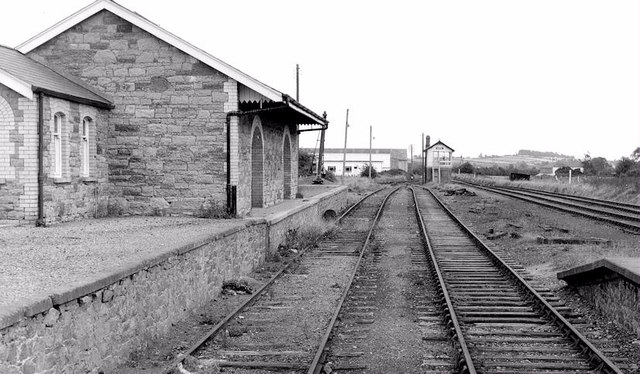

General information
- Location: Sean O'Carroll Street; Ardee, County Louth; Ireland
- Coordinates: 53.8565°N 6.5364°W
- Platforms: 1
- Tracks: 1

History
- Original company: Great Northern Railway (Ireland)

Key dates
- 1 August 1896: Station opens
- 3 June 1934: Station closes to passengers
- 3 November 1975: Goods service ends

Services
Preceding station	Disused railways	Following station
Dromin Junction	Great Northern Railway of Ireland; Ardee Branch	Terminus
Location

Ardee railway station was a railway station which served Ardee in County Louth, Ireland. It was the terminus of a branch which diverged from the Belfast-Dublin line at Dromin Junction.

== History ==
The station was opened by the Great Northern Railway of Ireland in 1896. Ardee lost its passenger services in 1934 but goods traffic continued to flow until the 1970s. The last scheduled service was a special in October 1975, and the line was unused after that time, the goods service officially closed in November 1975. The line was not officially abandoned until 1987, with the rails being 'lifted' shortly after.

== Engineer ==
In 1896 The Great Northern Railway had their own engineering staff working under the Chief Engineer William Hemmingway Mills. The Engineer in charge of the Ardee branch was Joshua H. Hargrave (1860-1924) who lived in Dún Laoghaire (known as Kingstown at the time).

== Today ==
Three small structures within the station site, all of which were built in 1880, are listed as protected structures. These include the former railway station building, a two-storey red brick house (former station masters house) and a locomotive shed. The former railway station building is being used as a commercial premises for a local garage called Mid-Louth Garage, a company that has been operational since 1974.

The trackbed itself had been converted into a pedestrian walkway by the local Tidy Towns committee with financial help from Louth County Council in 2007 and further upgrades occurring in 2014.
