= SS Belgian Captain =

7,041 GRT cargo ship

History
- Name: Empire Celtic (1942-43); Belgian Captain (1943-46); Capitaine Lambe (1946-60); Ardee (1960-64); Alpha Trader (1964-67)
- Owner: Ministry of War Transport (1942-43); Belgian Government (1943-46); Compagnie Maritime Belge (1946-60); Mullion & Co Ltd (1960-64); Sigma Shipping Co Ltd (1964-67)
- Operator: Crosby, Son & Co Ltd (1942-43); Agence Maritime Internationale SA (1943-46); Compagnie Maritime Belge (1946-60); Mullion & Co Ltd (1960-64); Trinity Development Co Ltd, (1964-67)
- Port of registry: (United Kingdom) West Hartlepool (1942-43); (Belgium) Antwerp (1943-60); Hong Kong (1960-67)
- Builder: William Gray & Co. Ltd.
- Launched: 30 July 1942
- Completed: October 1942
- Identification: Code Letters BFCB (1942-43); Code Letters ONVS (1943-46); Code Letters ONCC (1946-60); United Kingdom Official Number 168946 (1942-43)
- Fate: Scrapped 1964

General characteristics
- Tonnage: 7,041 GRT; 5,024 NRT
- Length: 431 ft 5 in (131.50 m)
- Beam: 56 ft 2 in (17.12 m)
- Draught: 35 ft 2 in (10.72 m)
- Installed power: Triple expansion steam engine
- Propulsion: Screw propeller

Belgian Captain was a 7,041 GRT cargo ship which was built in 1942 as Empire Centaur for the Ministry of War Transport (MoWT). In 1943 she was passed to the Belgian Government and renamed Belgian Captain. Postwar, she was sold into merchant service and renamed Capitaine Lambe. In 1960 she was sold to Hong Kong and renamed Ardee, being renamed Alpha Trader in 1964. She served until 1967 when she was scrapped.

== Description ==
The ship was built by William Gray & Co. Ltd., West Hartlepool. She was launched on 30 July 1942 and completed in October.

The ship was 431 feet 5 inches (131.50 m) long, with a beam of 56 feet 2 inches (17.12 m) and a depth of 33 feet 2 inches (10.11 m). She had a GRT of 7,041 and a NRT of 5,024.

The ship was propelled by a triple expansion steam engine, which had cylinders of 24 1/2 inches (62 cm), 39 inches (99 cm) and 70 inches (180 cm) diameter by 48 inches (120 cm) stroke. The engine was built by the Central Marine Engine Works, West Hartlepool.

== History ==
=== Second World War ===
Empire Centaur was placed under the management of Crosby, Son & Co Ltd. Her port of registry was West Hartlepool. The United Kingdom Official Number 168946 and Code Letters BCFB were allocated.

On 12 December 1942, Empire Centaur was damaged in an attack by Italian assault craft at Algiers. The attack was carried out by the Decima Flottiglia MAS of the Regia Marina, using manned torpedoes despatched from the submarine Ambra. Empire Centaur returned to the United Kingdom in Convoy MKS 7, which departed from Algiers on 5 February 1943 and arrived at Liverpool on 17 March. She was bound for Cardiff.

Empire Centaur was allocated to the Belgian Government in 1943 and renamed Belgian Captain. The Code Letters ONVS were allocated, and she was placed under the management of Agence Maritime Internationale SA. Her port of registry was Antwerp.

Belgian Captain was a member of a number of convoys during the Second World War.

ON 177

Convoy ON 177 departed Cardiff on 4 April 1943 bound for New York. Belgian Captain was carrying a cargo of coal bound for Halifax, Nova Scotia.

HX 241

Convoy HX 241 departed New York on 25 May 1943 and arrived at Liverpool on 10 June. Belgian Captain was carrying a cargo of steel and lumber bound for London. She sailed from Halifax on 27 May and joined the convoy at sea on 29 May.

ON 192

Convoy ON 192 departed Milford Haven, Pembrokeshire on 8 July 1943 bound for New York. Belgian Captain was bound for Halifax, Nova Scotia.

HX 254

Convoy HX 254 departed New York on 27 August 1943 and arrived at Liverpool on 12 September. Belgian Captain was carrying a cargo of steel and lumber bound for Sunderland. There were complaints from other ships in the convoy that Belgian Captain did not repeat flag signals, despite orders to all ships to do so.

ON206

Convoy ON 206 departed Liverpool on 11 October 1943 bound for New York.

ON 291

Convoy ON 291 departed Southend-on-Sea, Essex on 17 March 1945 bound for New York.

=== Postwar ===
In 1946, Belgian Captain was sold to Compagnie Maritime Belge SA and was renamed Capitaine Lambe. Her Code Letters were changed to ONCC. In 1960, Capitaine Lambe was sold to Mullion & Co Ltd, Hong Kong and was renamed Ardee. In 1964, she was sold to Sigma Shipping Co Ltd, Hong Kong and was renamed Alpha Trader. She was operated under the management of Trinity Development Co Ltd, Hong Kong. Alpha Trader served until 1967. She arrived at Shanghai, China for scrapping in November 1967.
