= Ardee RFC =

Irish rugby union club based in Ardee, Co. Louth

(Ireland) Ardee
- Full name: Ardee Rugby Football Club
- Union: IRFU; Leinster
- Founded: 1980; 46 years ago
- Ground(s): Townspark, Ardee, County Louth
- President: Ronan O'Brien
- Coach(es): Ronan O'Brien jnr, Enda Dunne, Shane O'Brien
Team kit

Ardee RFC is an Irish rugby union team based in Ardee, County Louth, Ireland. They play in Division 3 of the Leinster League, organised by the Leinster Branch of the IRFU. The club colours are navy and white.

== History ==
Ardee RFC was founded in 1980 after a meeting of 22 people from Ardee Golf Club, they wanted to provide a rugby club for youths and juveniles in the mid-Louth area. The first adult match was played on St. Stephen's Day and against Athboy RFC, Ardee RFC officially began competing in the 1983/84 season.

In the 1988/89 season, the club purchased land at Townspark and it has been the club grounds of Ardee RFC since.
