= Ardee =

Town in County Louth, Ireland

Ardee Baile Átha Fhirdhia (Irish)
- Town
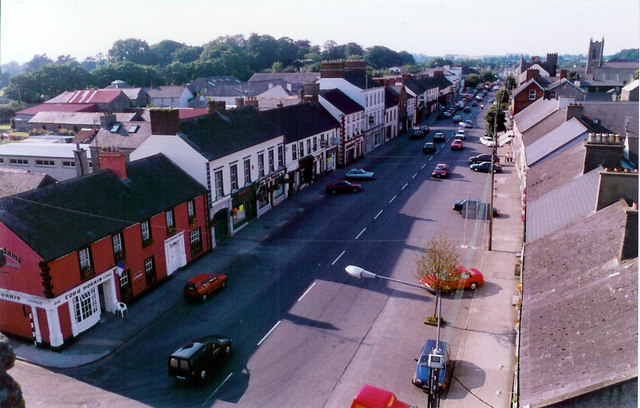
- View north along Market Street, from the battlements of Ardee Castle, 1997

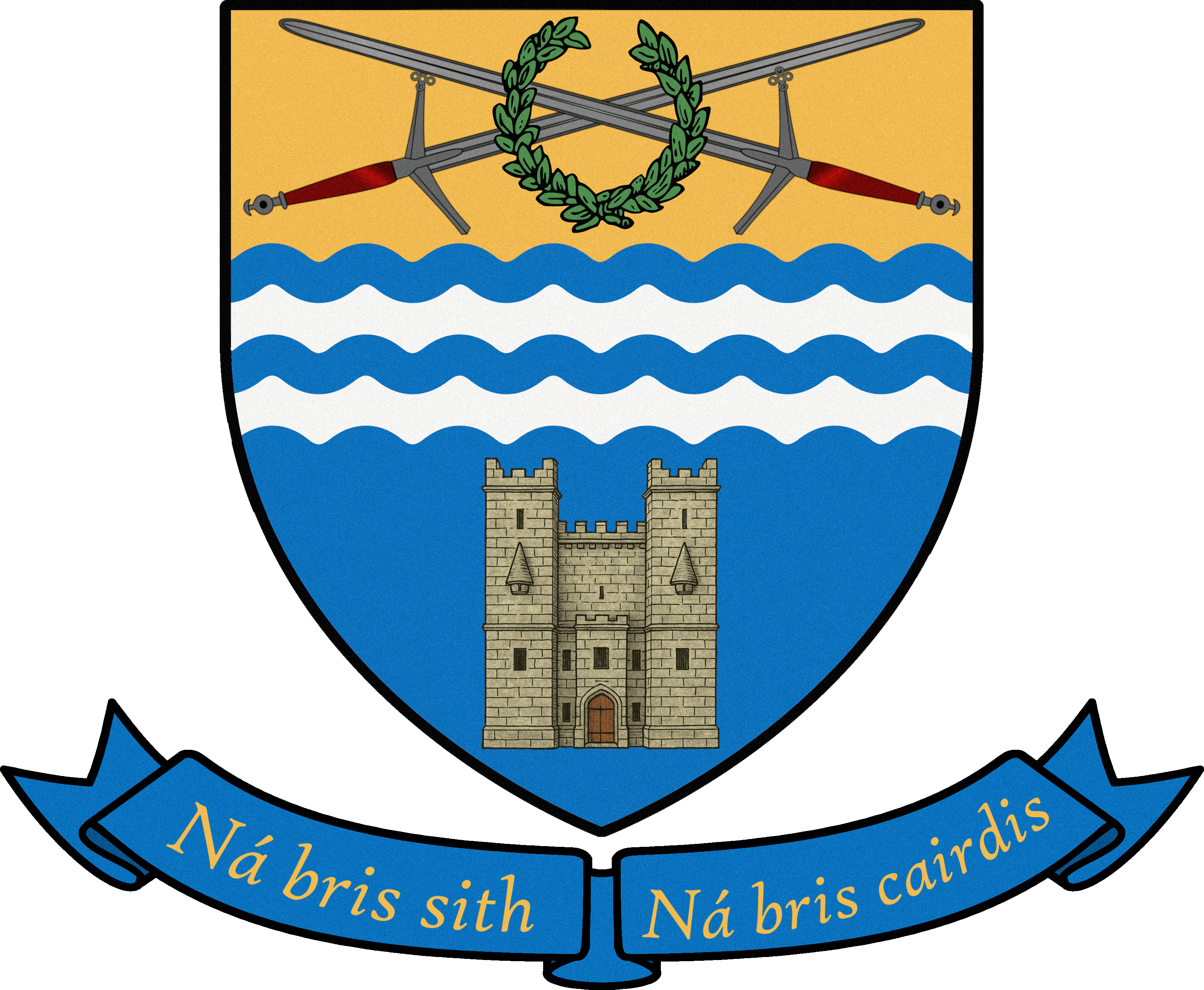
- Coat of arms
- Motto: Na Bris Sith, Na Bris Cairdis; Don't Break Peace, Don't Break Friendship
- Location in Ireland
- Coordinates: 53.8554°N 6.5379°W
- Country: Ireland
- Province: Leinster
- County: County Louth
- Dáil Éireann: Louth
- EU Parliament: Midlands–North-West

Population (2022)
  - Total: 5,478
- Time zone: UTC±0 (WET)
  - Summer (DST): UTC+1 (IST)
- Eircode routing key: A92
- Telephone area code: +353(0)41
- Irish Grid Reference: N958906

Ardee (/ˈɑːrdiː/; Irish: Baile Átha Fhirdhia, pronounced [ˈbˠalʲə aːhə ˈɪɾʲjiə]) is a town and townland in County Louth, Ireland. It is located at the intersection of the N2, N52, and N33 roads. The town shows evidence of development from the thirteenth century onward but as a result of the continued development of the town since then much of the fabric of the medieval town has been removed. The town is in a civil parish of the same name.

Ardee is on the banks of the River Dee and is equidistant between the county's two biggest towns - approximately 20 kilometres (12 mi) from Dundalk and Drogheda, while it is also close to Slane and Carrickmacross.

In the 20 years between the 1996 and 2016 census, the population of Ardee increased by approximately 30%, from 3,791 to 4,928 inhabitants. By 2022, it had a population of 5,478.

== History ==
Historical population
Year	Pop.	±%
1801	2,067	—
1901	1,883	−8.9%
1911	1,773	−5.8%
1926	1,729	−2.5%
1936	2,383	+37.8%
1946	2,346	−1.6%
1951	2,489	+6.1%
1956	2,719	+9.2%
1961	2,710	−0.3%
1966	2,919	+7.7%
1971	3,096	+6.1%
1979	2,982	−3.7%
1981	3,199	+7.3%
1986	3,253	+1.7%
1991	3,296	+1.3%
1996	3,440	+4.4%
2002	3,564	+3.6%
2006	4,301	+20.7%
2011	4,554	+5.9%
2016	4,928	+8.2%
2022	5,478	+11.2%

=== Origins ===
Originally called Atherdee, the town's name is from Irish: Áth Fhirdia (the Ford of Ferdia) which itself is derived from the fabled four-day battle between Cúchulainn and Ferdia, for the defence of Ulster from Queen Maeve of Connacht. It is said Ferdia fell after four days of battle, and is buried on the southern banks of the river alongside the Riverside Walk. A depiction of the pair is located on Bridge Street in the town as a bronze statue. The River Dee was originally named in Irish: An Níth but took on the final element of the town's name in English usage.

Ardee is an example of a medieval "walled town", a number of which can be found across Ireland. The town itself is situated in the ancient territory known as Crích Rois or Fir Rois. The town lies along the 15th-century Pale frontier between Dundalk and Kells.

The town comprises the townlands or town parks – the greater portion of which is made up of Ardee bog, and a small portion of Dawson's Demesne, which takes in the southeastern quadrant of the town on the northern side of the River Dee.

Ardee received its royal charter from King Henry V in 1414.

=== Smith schools ===
A philanthropic trust founded by Erasmus Smith in the 17th century funded the establishment of a boys' school in 1806 and a girls' school in 1817. Both Protestant and Catholic children were allowed to attend. At the time there were other schools but in 1824 they became the sole schools in the area. The Smith schools amalgamated into a combined-sex establishment by 1858, by which time the National School movement was leading to the creation of denominational schools there. The school remained a non-denominational institute but the school decreased in numbers and in 1868 had a roll of only 16 Protestant boys. It was fully integrated into the National School system in 1954, when it became known as Saint Mary's Church of Ireland National School.

== Administration ==
Ardee is in the local government area of Louth County Council. Members of the council are elected from five local electoral areas in the county. The Ardee local electoral area returns six of the council's 29 members, who sit as the Ardee Municipal District. As of the 2024 local elections, the members included:

Council members from 2024 election
Local electoral area	Name	Party
Ardee	Dolores Minogue	Fine Gael
Ardee	Paula Butterly	Fine Gael
Ardee	Pearse McGeough	Sinn Féin
Ardee	Jim Tenanty	Independent
Ardee	John Sheridan	Fianna Fáil
Ardee	Bertie Conlon	Independent

Ardee had a corporation first mentioned in a charter of 1378. An electorate of 24 burgesses and 80 freemen elected two MPs for the parliamentary borough of Ardee to the Irish House of Commons. It was disfranchised under the Acts of Union 1800. The corporation was abolished by the Municipal Corporations (Ireland) Act 1840.

== Media ==
Newspapers include the Mid-Louth Independent, a regional edition of the Drogheda Independent newspaper, which is published weekly. It is distributed and sold in Ardee, Collon, Dunleer and Tallanstown. The Dundalk Democrat is the regional edition of the weekly newspaper, which covers Ardee and its surroundings.

LMFM Radio is the local radio station for the North East covering Ardee as well as the rest of Louth, Meath, Monaghan and North Dublin.

== Transport ==
Ardee railway station, previously serving the town, was linked to the main Belfast–Dublin line at Dromin Junction station, along a five-mile (8 km) long branch line. Ardee railway station opened on 1 August 1896 and passenger services ended on 3 June 1934. The line continued as a freight service until finally closed on 3 November 1976, serving the local fertiliser factory, sugar beet and livestock transport. The trackbed was lifted in the late 1980s, and much of the short route is now a designated walkway.

Ardee's transport network consists of the N2, which runs directly through the town, and the M1 motorway, which is connected to Ardee through a bypass/link road the N33. The N52, which connects the M7 at Nenagh to the M1 at Dundalk, passes through the town serving a southwest-northeast link from Limerick to Belfast without going near Dublin and the M50.

== Religion ==
Ardee is in the Roman Catholic parish of Ardee and Collon which lies in the Archdiocese of Armagh in the ecclesiastical province of Armagh.

In April 2021, the Traditionalist Catholic Institute of Christ the King Sovereign Priest purchased a former convent building in Ardee, for the use of its own nuns; the Sisters Adorers.

== Culture ==
=== Built heritage ===
==== Ardee Castle ====
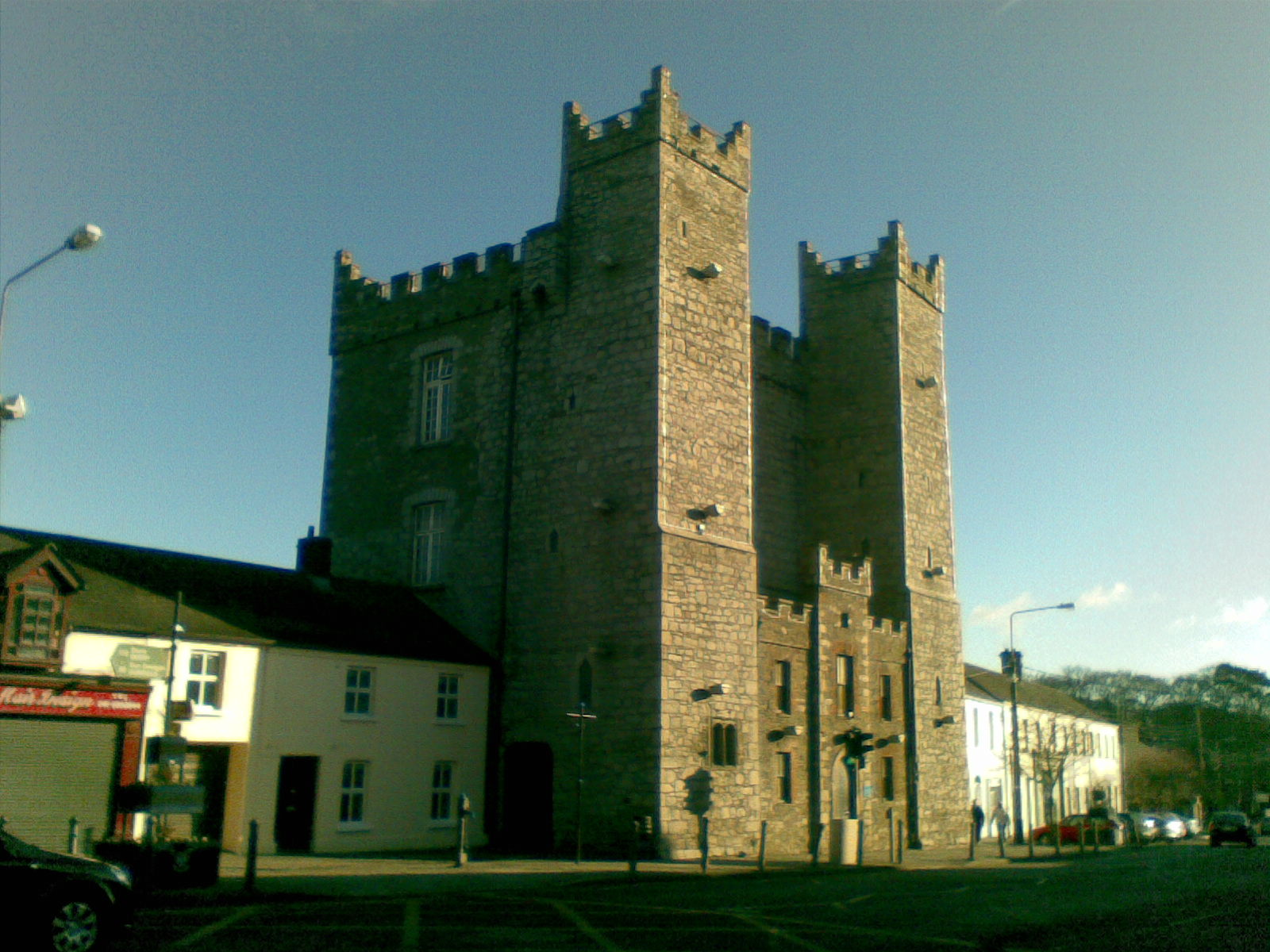
Ardee Castle

Ardee's identity as a walled town is further enhanced by surviving medieval buildings and some of the features that survive within the town, including the intact medieval street pattern and the castle itself. Previously known as St. Leger's Castle, Ardee Castle is the largest fortified medieval tower house in Ireland. Built circa 15th century, the castle was used as a prison during the 17th and 18th centuries, before going on to become Ardee's district courthouse until June 2006 when a specialised facility was built as it "could no longer meet the official needs of court users in the 21st century".

==== Chantry College ====
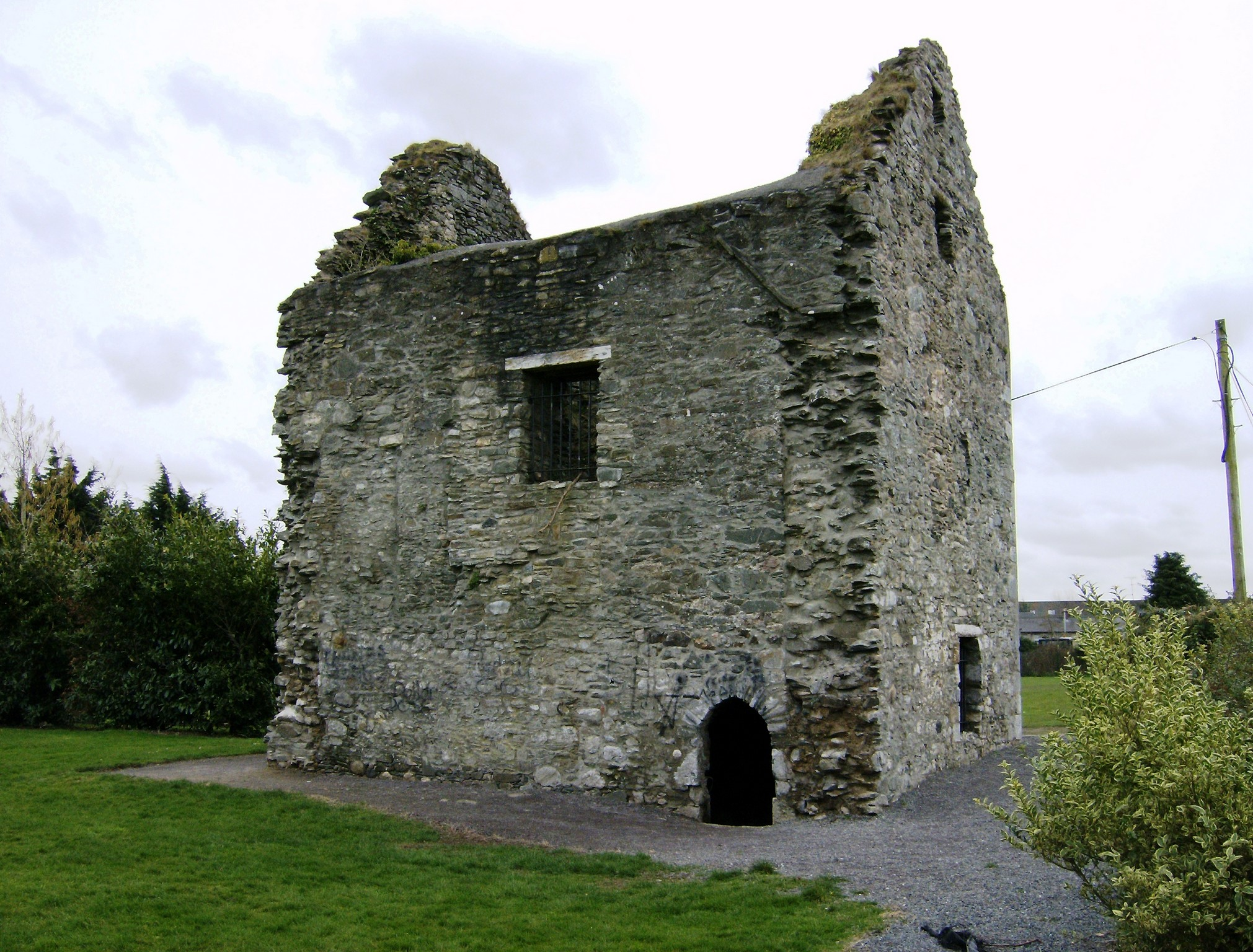
Chantry College

Founded a short time prior to 1487, "Chantry College" consists of a gabled tower, four storeys in height, which has an adjoining two-storey hall to the north. Although the structure was defensible, it is not classified as a fortified townhouse. It was an ecclesiastical building, and as such differs from the two castles in the town. The small section of the original building shares similarities to another surviving building in Howth, Dublin.

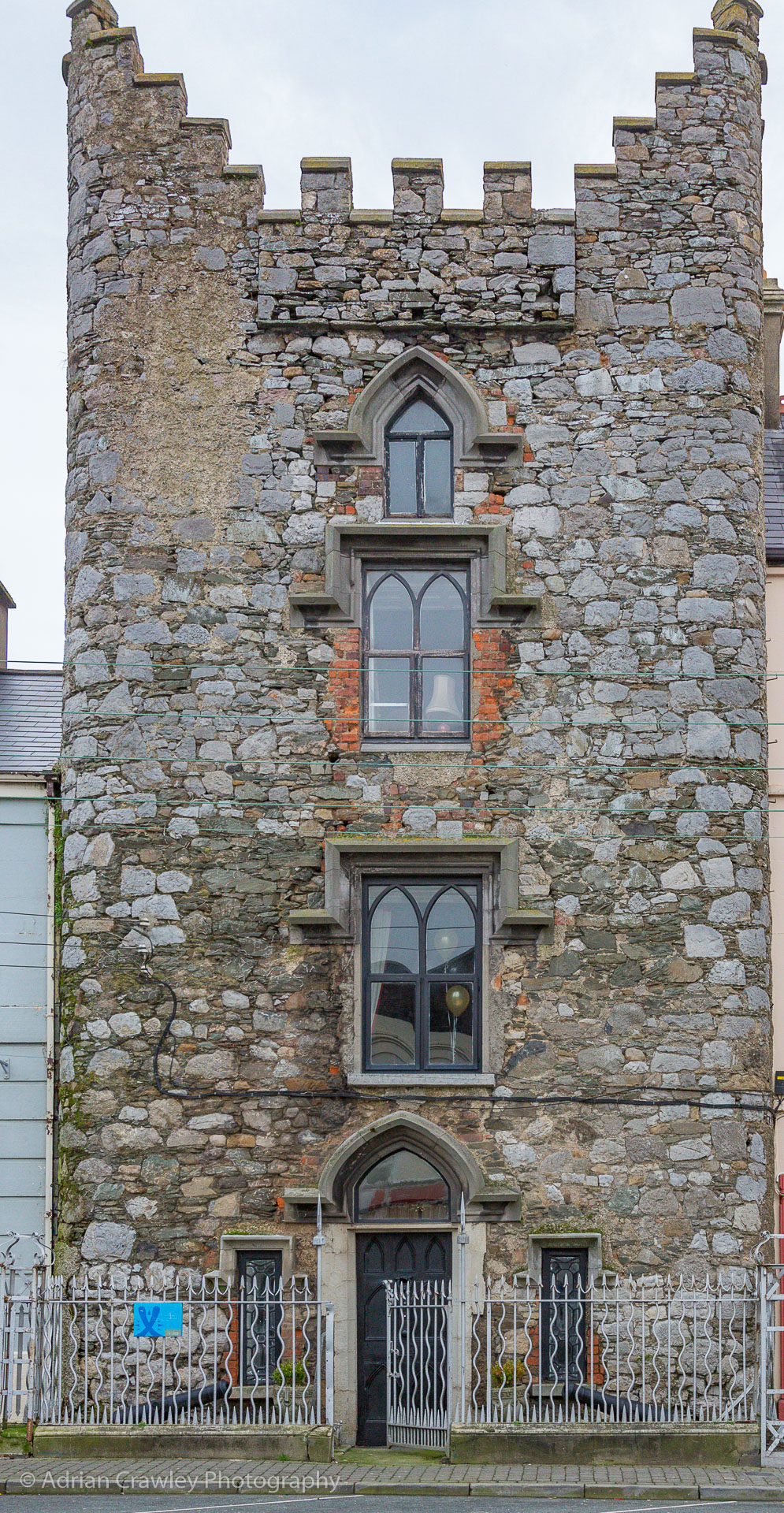
Hatch's Castle

==== Hatch's Castle ====
A gift given to the Hatch family by Oliver Cromwell, Hatch's Castle is still in use as a private family home and as a bed and breakfast. A late 14th-century urban fortified house, it is the older of the town's two castles. It was modernised in the 19th century with large windows placed in the east and west faces. The southern corner has a projecting turret which houses a spiral stairway to roof level.

==== Jumping Church of Kildemock ====
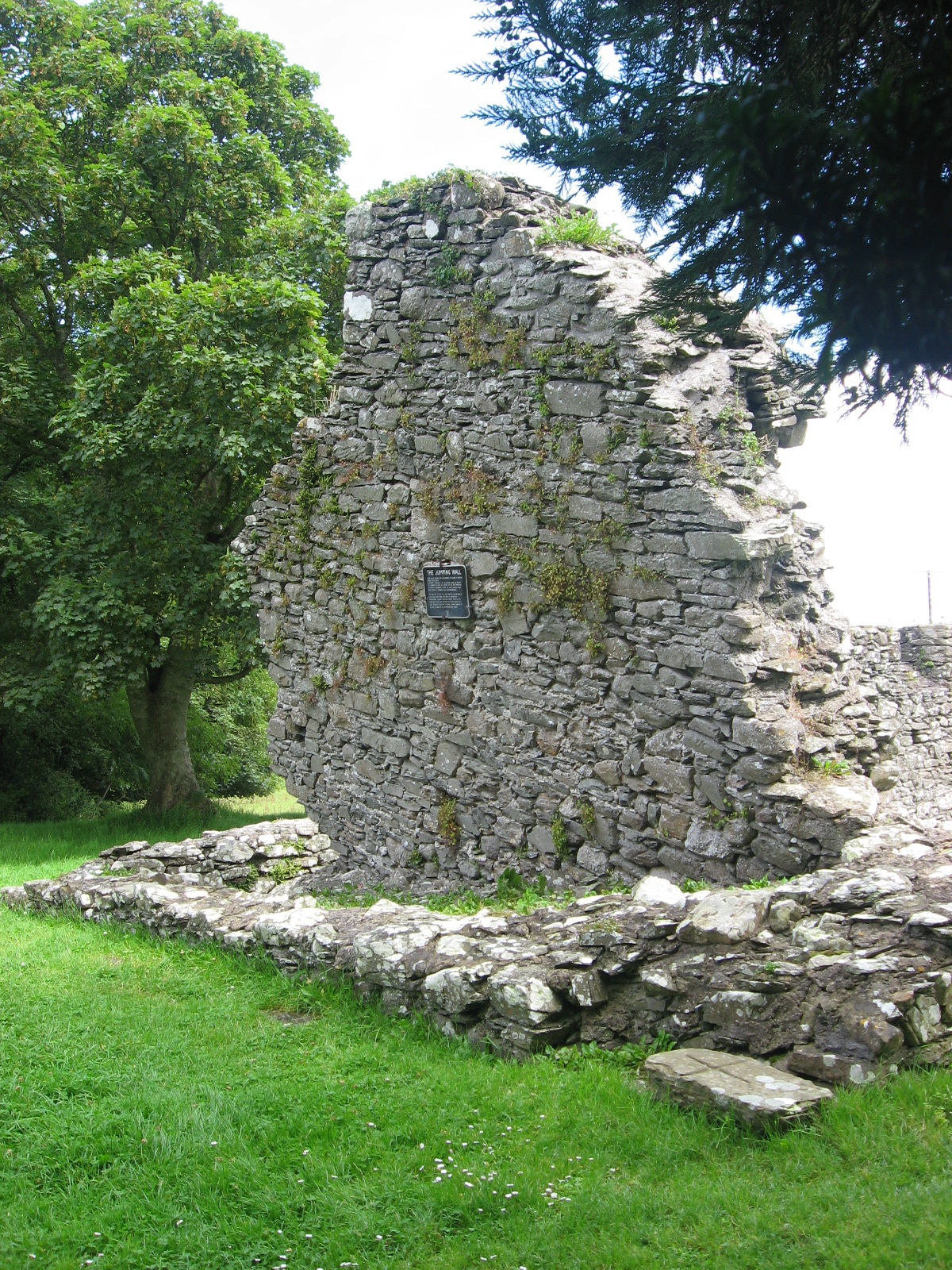
The west gable that "jumped"

The Jumping Church of Kildemock (also known as Millockstown Church) is a tourist attraction in Ardee which claims to be an "unsolved mystery". The site was restored in 1954 after the site was cleared of debris by archaeologists the previous year. Excavations revealed stained glass fragments and stone carvings suggesting that the church was rebuilt at that time. The site fell into disrepair after the Dissolution of the monasteries by Henry VIII. Legend surrounding the church states that a non-Christian was believed to be buried inside the church walls in 1715, and that the church "jumped" later that night to leave his remains outside of the sacred grounds.

A plaque on the site reads:

"This wall by its pitch, tilt and position can be seen to have moved three feet from its foundation. Contemporary accounts mention a severe storm in 1715 when the wall was lifted and deposited as it now stands but local tradition states that the wall jumped inwards to exclude the grave of an excommunicated person."

All that remains at Kildemock today is a small ruin, containing the wall that for a reason unknown moved three feet. It is believed to be caused by a storm but this cannot be confirmed.

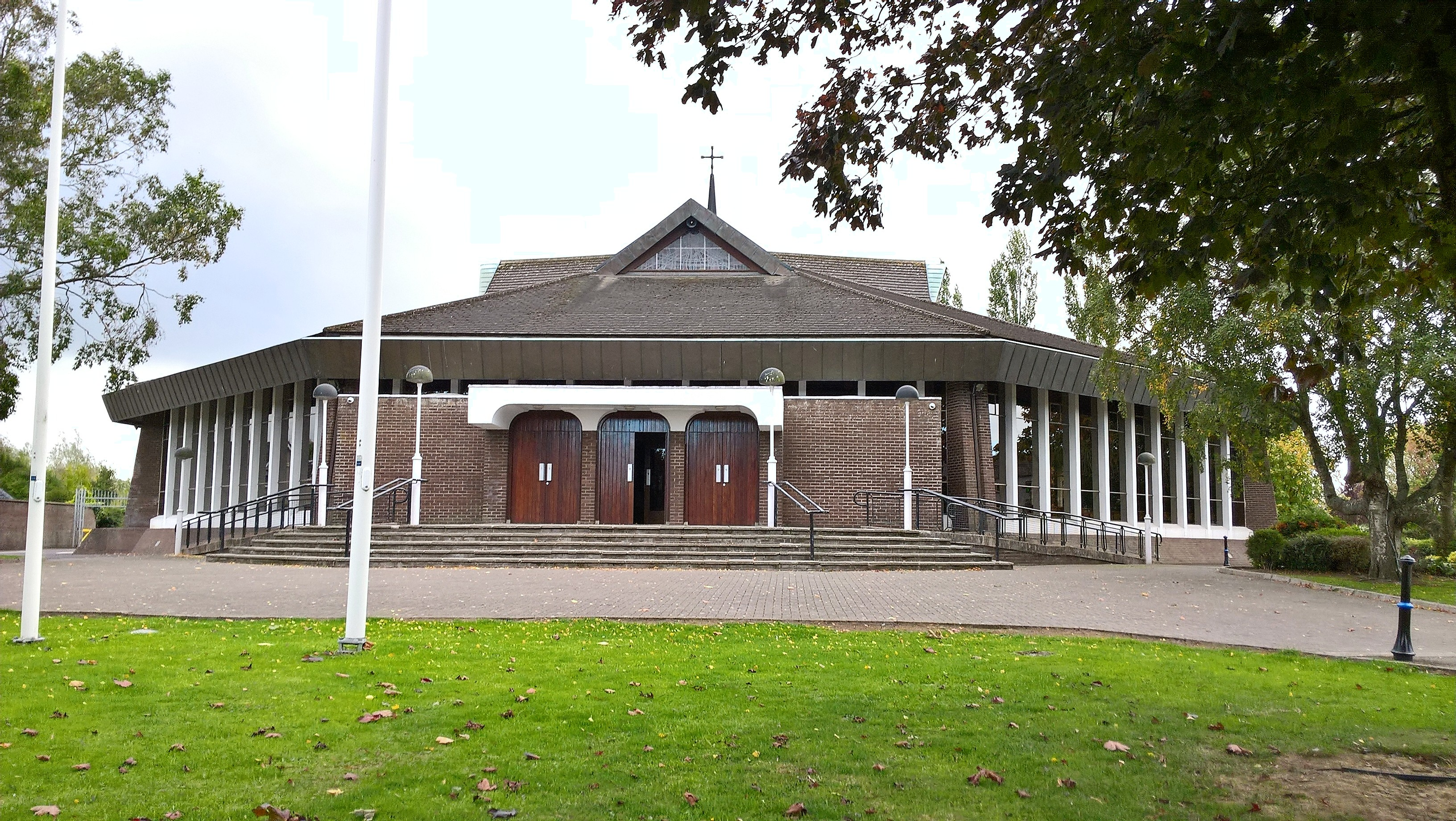
Church of the Nativity of Our Lady

==== Nativity of our Lady Church ====
The church is a detached multi-bay Roman Catholic church, built in 1974. The church replaced a previously existing Catholic church built in 1829, which is now derelict.

It is a post-Vatican II church, designed by Guy Moloney and Associates. The leaded light clerestory windows introduce colour to what is otherwise a plain interior.

==== Saint Mary's Church ====
Built in the early 19th century on the site of an earlier church, St Mary's Church was substantially repaired and rebuilt preserving portions of a tower belonging to a previous church. This site has been the focus of Christian worship for at least eight hundred years.

=== Arts and festivals ===
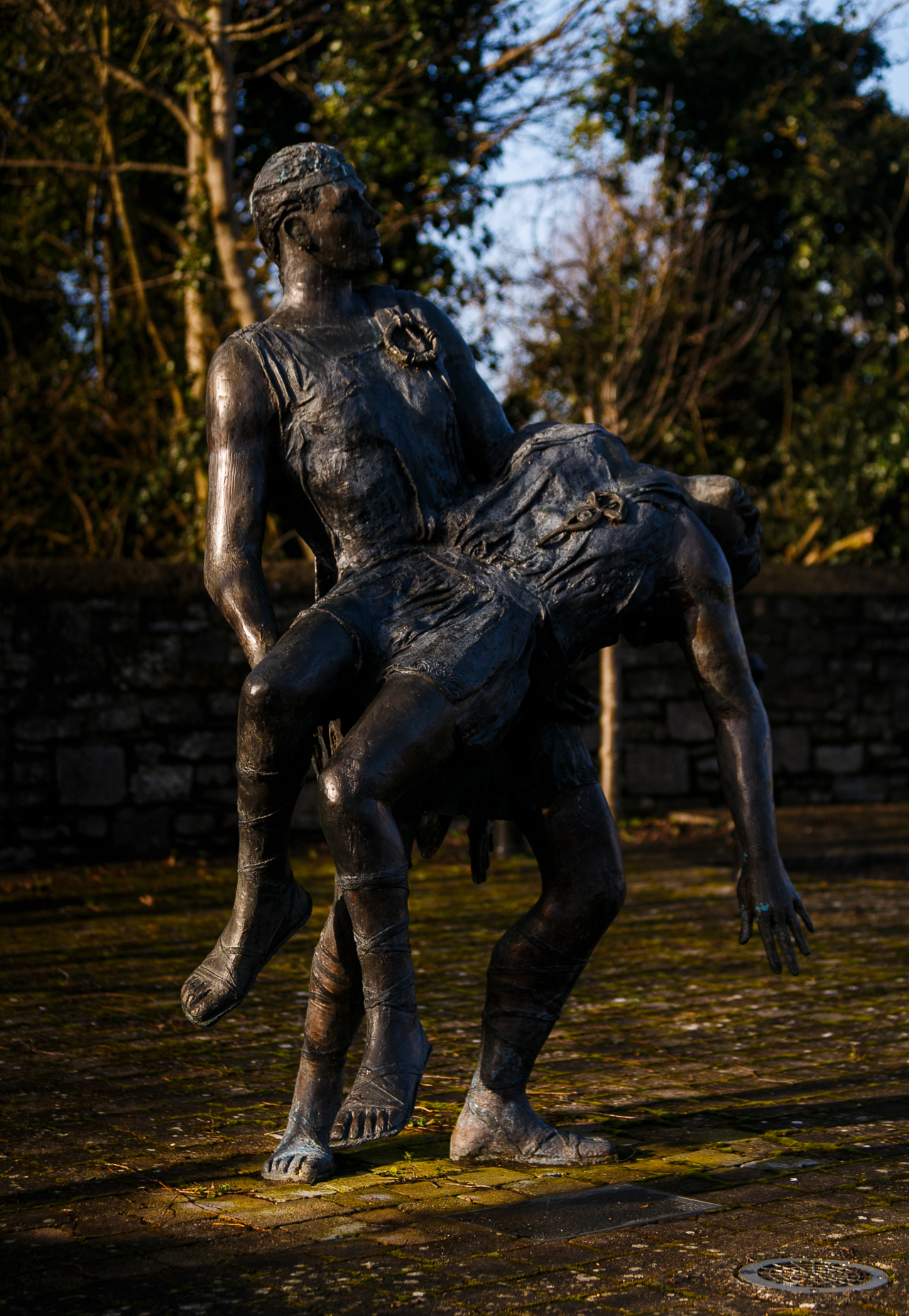
Cuchulainn and Ferdia Statue

Founded in 1860, Ardee Concert Band is the third oldest concert band in Ireland.

Ardee has an annual St Patrick's Parade on 17 March. The first parade began in Ardee in 1962 and has run almost every year since then, exceptions include 2001's cancellation due to the foot-and-mouth crisis, 2020's cancellation due to COVID-19.

Since 2004, the town has hosted the Ardee Baroque Festival, which includes performances by the Irish Baroque Orchestra and others.

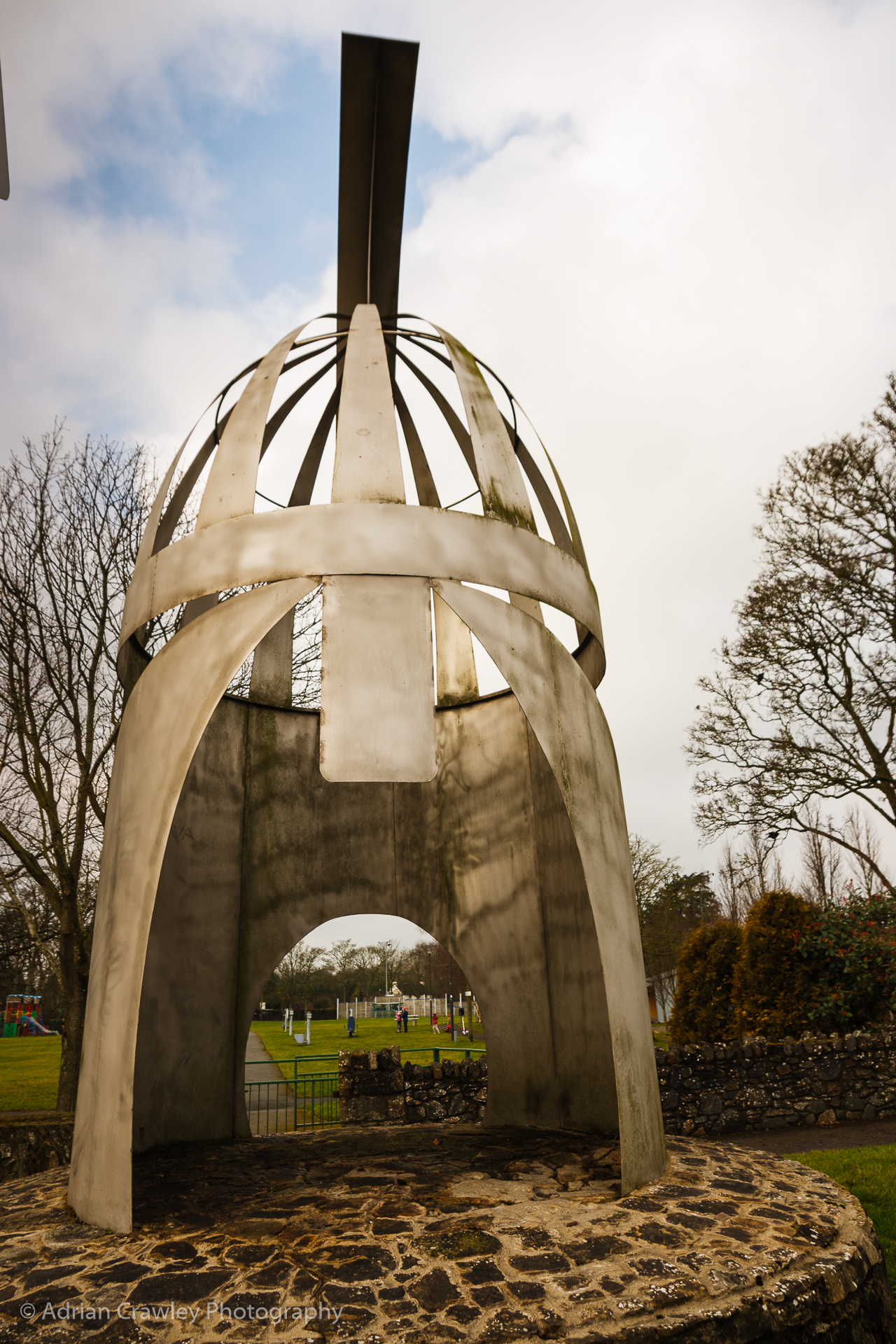
Helmet Monument

The "Turfman Festival", launched in Ardee in 2009, was held on the August bank holiday weekend and included a number of community events and a Festival Queen competition. The festival was last held in 2013.

== Education ==
Ardee has one secondary school, Ardee Community School, which opened in 1974. The school was an amalgamation of three schools that had previously existed independently; St. Anne's Convent of Mercy, De La Salle Brothers' School and the Vocational School. As of 2019, the school had a student body of around 890.

There are three primary schools in the town: Monastery Boys National School, Scoil Mhuire na Trocaire Girls School and Ardee Educate Together. Ardee Educate Together is a multi-cultural primary school for both girls and boys. Ballapousta National School is located just outside the town and (as of early 2020) had approximately 220 pupils. As of 2014, the Monastery Boys National School had approximately 250 pupils enrolled, while the Scoil Mhuire na Trocaire Girls School and the Educate Together School had 290 and 150 pupils respectively as of early 2020.

== Sport ==
=== Association football ===
Ardee is home to two association football (soccer) clubs that play in the North East Football League (formerly MDL) - Square United and Ardee Celtic. Both teams have junior sections that cater for very young players up to Under-18 level.

=== GAA ===
Ardee St Marys are the main GAA team in Ardee. The club has won 13 Louth Senior Football Championship titles in their history - the first in 1914 and the most recent in 2024.

There are five other GAA sides located in Ardee's hinterland - Hunterstown Rovers, Westerns GFC, John Mitchels, Sean McDermotts and Stabannon Parnells. Hunterstown Rovers are twice Louth Intermediate Championships and were founded in 1941.

=== Rugby ===
The town's rugby club, Ardee Rugby Club, has a first and second senior team and a number of juvenile teams. The club won the McGee Cup in 2015.

=== Other sports ===
Ardee and District Athletic Club was founded in 1992. It was originally named Ferdia A.C., but changed its name in 2000.

Ardee Cycling Club, formed in 2010, organises cycling groups of differing abilities. The club also engages in charity cycles.

== Twin town ==
- Nettuno, Italy

== People ==
- Ross Gaynor, former professional footballer.
- Kian Leavy, professional footballer and Republic of Ireland international.
- Donal McKenny, Gaelic footballer.
- Mairead McGuinness, former European Commissioner, Vice-President and MEP, attended secondary school in Ardee.
- Dermot O'Brien, céilí and showband musician.
- Fergal Reilly, film maker.
